= Ireland Way =

Walking and cycling trail in Ireland

- Length: 840km
- Location: Republic of Ireland - Counties Cork, Kerry, Limerick, Tipperary, Offaly, Galway, Roscommon, Sligo, Leitrim & Cavan, Fermanagh, Tyrone, Londonderry, Antrim
- Trailheads: Beara Peninsula and Ballycastle
- Use: Walking and cycling
- Season: Any
- Website: http://theirelandway.ie/

The Ireland Way is Ireland's longest coast-to-coast walking and cycling trail that joins the newly developed Beara-Breifne Way to the Ulster Way on the island of Ireland. The trail goes from the Beara Peninsula in County Cork, Republic of Ireland to Ballycastle, County Antrim in Northern Ireland. The Beara-Breifne Way trail follows closely the line of the historical march of O’Sullivan Beare. One of the first people to walk the Ireland Way in one go was a Canadian woman named Maysen Forbes in 2017.

== Route ==
The completed route will interconnect existing walking routes: The Beara Way, the Sli Gaeltacht Mhuscrai, the North Cork Way, the Ballyhoura Way, the Multeen Way, the Ormond Way, the Hymany Way, the Suck Valley Way, the Lung Lough Gara Way, the Miners Way and Historical Trail, the Leitrim Way, the Cavan Way and the Ulster Way, ending with the Causeway Coast Way.
