= Lung Lough Gara Way =

Hiking trail in Ireland

- Length: 58 kilometres (36 miles)
- Location: County Roscommon and County Sligo, Ireland
- Designation: National Waymarked Trail
- Trailheads: Castlerea
- Use: Hiking
- Elevation gain/loss: 81 m (266 ft)
- Difficulty: Moderate
- Season: Any

The Lung Lough Gara Way is a long-distance trail in Ireland. It is a 58-kilometre (36-mile) hiking trail that begins in Castlerea, County Roscommon. It is typically completed in three days. It forms part of the Beara-Breifne Way and shares part of its route with the Suck Valley Way. The trail follows quiet local roads, pasture and bog land to link in with the Miners Way. It has received funding for its development from the Irish government.
