= Castlerea =

Town in County Roscommon, Ireland

Castlerea An Caisleán Riabhach
- Town
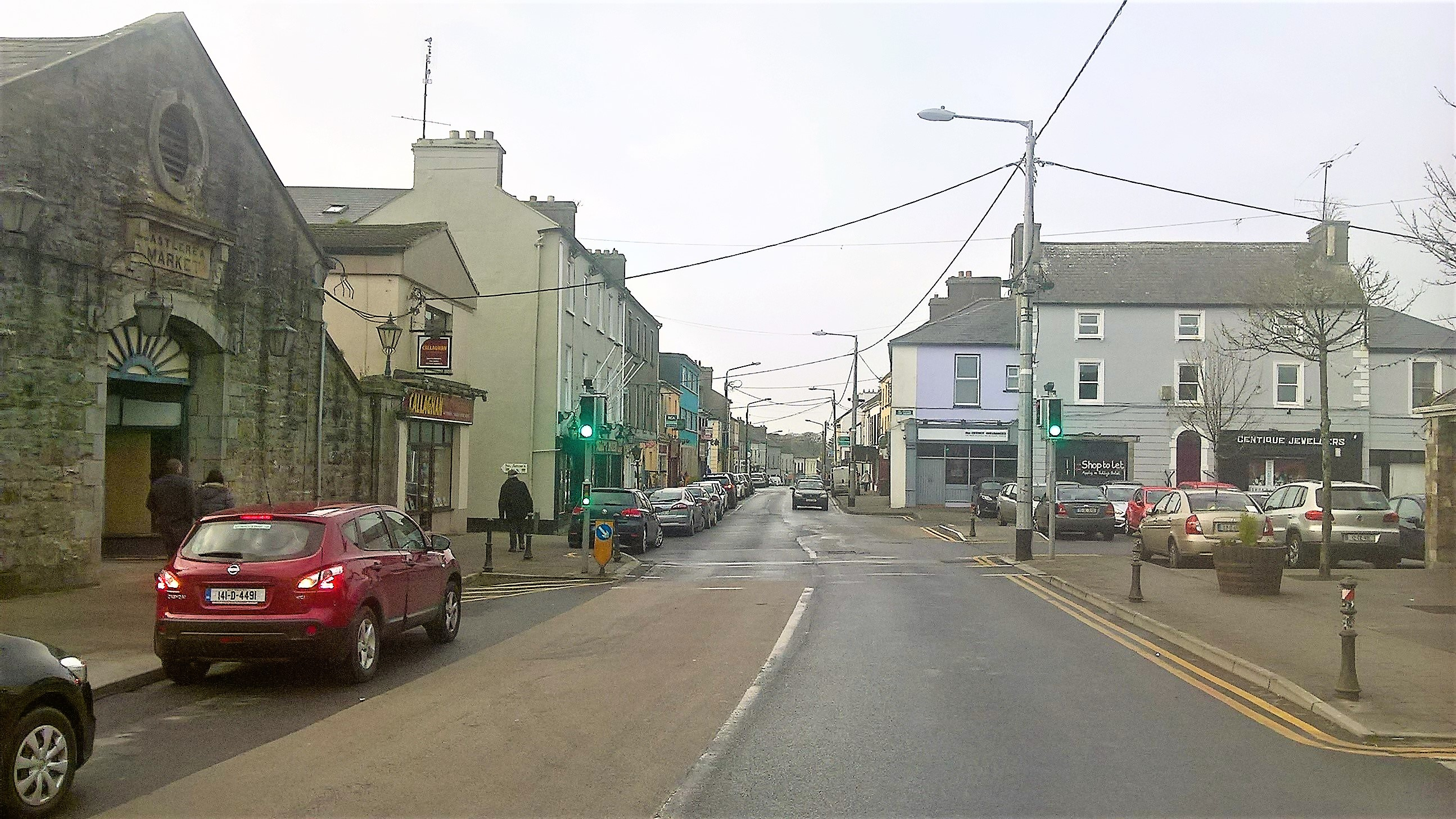
- Main Street, Castelrea

- Location in Ireland
- Coordinates: 53.7667°N 8.5°W
- Country: Ireland
- Province: Connacht
- County: Roscommon
- Elevation: 82 m (269 ft)

Population (2022)
  - Total: 2,348
- Eircode routing key: F45
- Telephone area code: +353(0)94
- Irish Grid Reference: M670797

Castlerea (/ˌkæsəlˈriː/ KASS-əl-REE; Irish: An Caisleán Riabhach, meaning 'brindled castle') is a town in County Roscommon, Ireland. It is located in the west of the county and had a population of 2,348 at the 2022 census. Roughly translated from Irish, Castlerea is generally thought to mean 'brindled castle' (Caisleán Riabhach). An alternative translation is 'castle of the king' (Caisleán Rí). The town is built on the banks of the River Suck and the River Francis, both of which are tributaries of the River Shannon.

== History ==
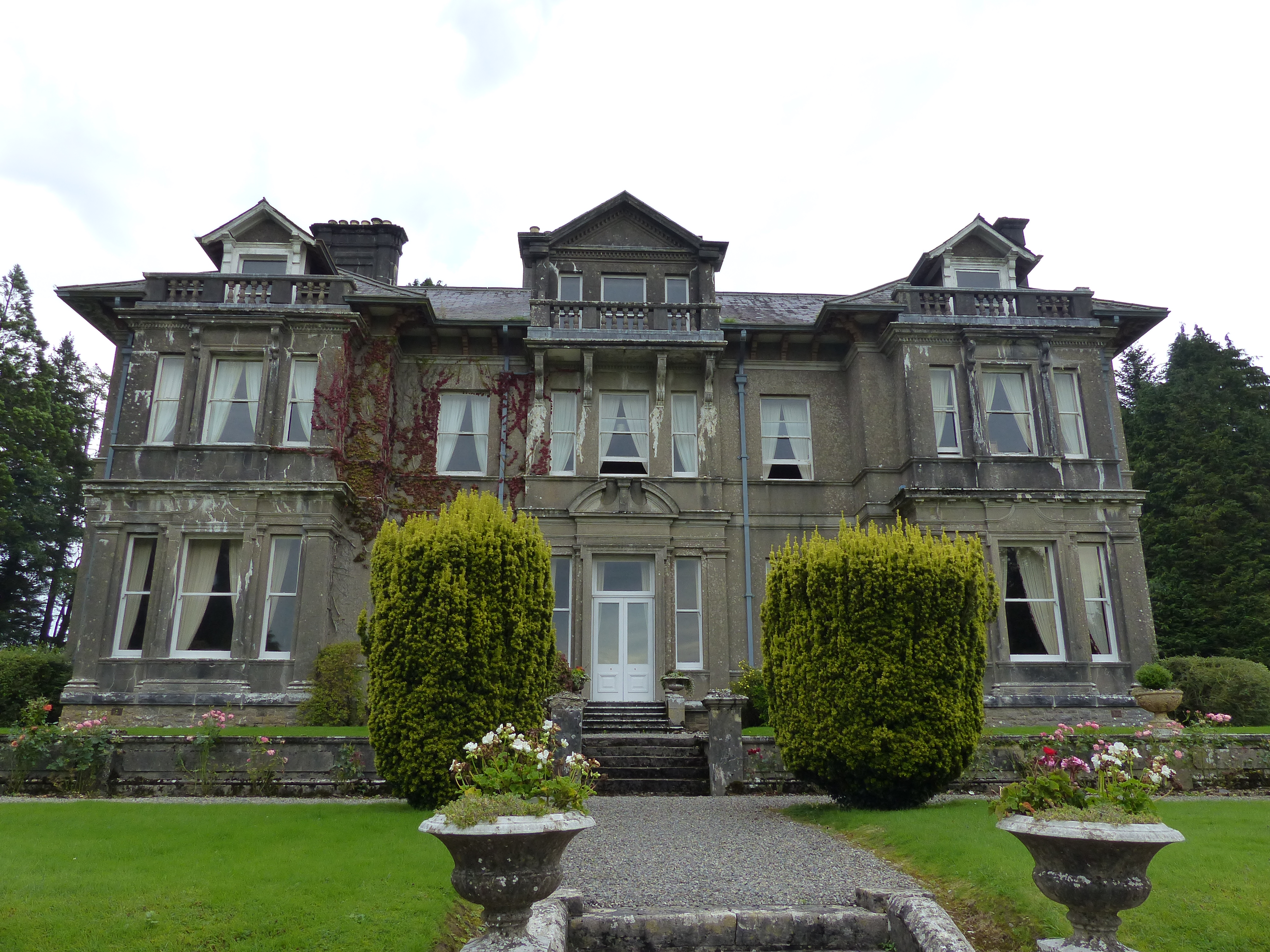
Clonalis House

Clonalis House, located in the west of Castlerea, is the ancestral home of the Clan O'Conor, the last of the High Kings of Ireland. The O'Connor dynasty produced eleven high kings of Ireland and twenty-four kings of Connacht.

Theophilus Sandford, a member of Oliver Cromwell's army in Ireland, received a large allocation of lands confiscated from the O'Connor family as part of the Act for the Settlement of Ireland 1652. This package included Castlerea. Castlerea developed under the Sandfords, who established a distillery (at its height producing more than 91,000 litres or 20,000 imperial gallons of whiskey annually), a brewery, and a tannery. Sandford's descendants continued in power through the 19th century. The estate was later acquired by the Land Commission and the Congested Districts Board. The demesne in which it was set survives and is now enjoyed as a public park.

On 11 July 1921, Sergeant James King of the Royal Irish Constabulary was shot in Castlerea on St Patrick Street and died of his wounds shortly afterwards. The Truce of July 1921 was declared later that day, making Sergeant King the last casualty of the Irish War of Independence.

On 17 June 2020, Detective Garda Colm Horkan was shot dead by a 43-year-old man in Castlerea when his firearm was snatched from him who then fired fifteen rounds at him. Horkan became the 89th garda to be killed in the line of duty.

== Sport ==
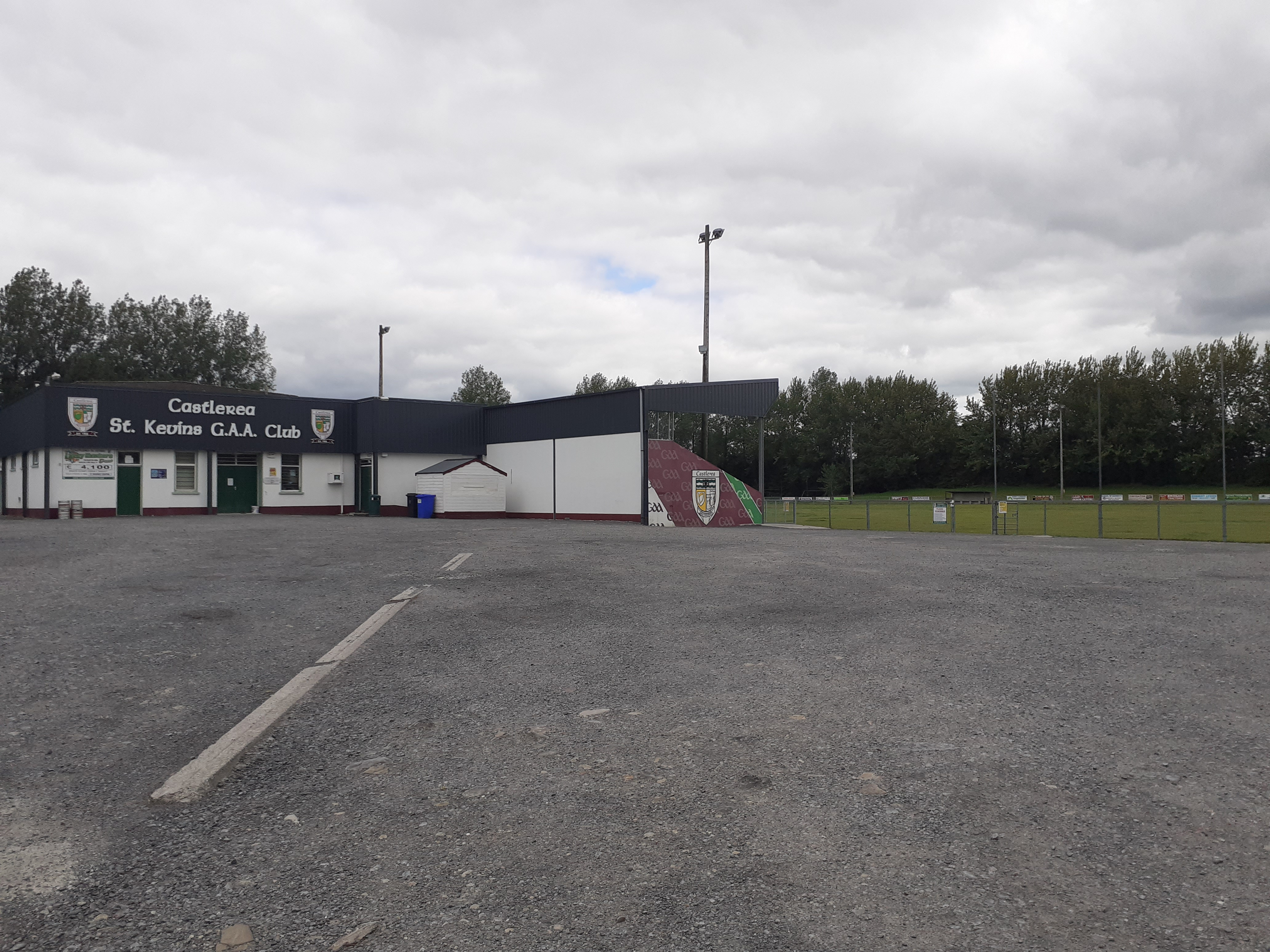
St. Kevin's GAA club

The local association football (soccer) club is Castlerea Celtic, and the Gaelic Athletic Association (GAA) club is St Kevin's. Castlerea Cavaliers is a basketball club with ladies and men teams.

The Castlerea Enterprise Hub located in the town business park is also home to the town's gym and to Castlerea Boxing Club. Castlerea is home to the boxers Aoife O'Rourke and Lisa O'Rourke, who have collectively won a number of World and European titles.

== Amenities ==
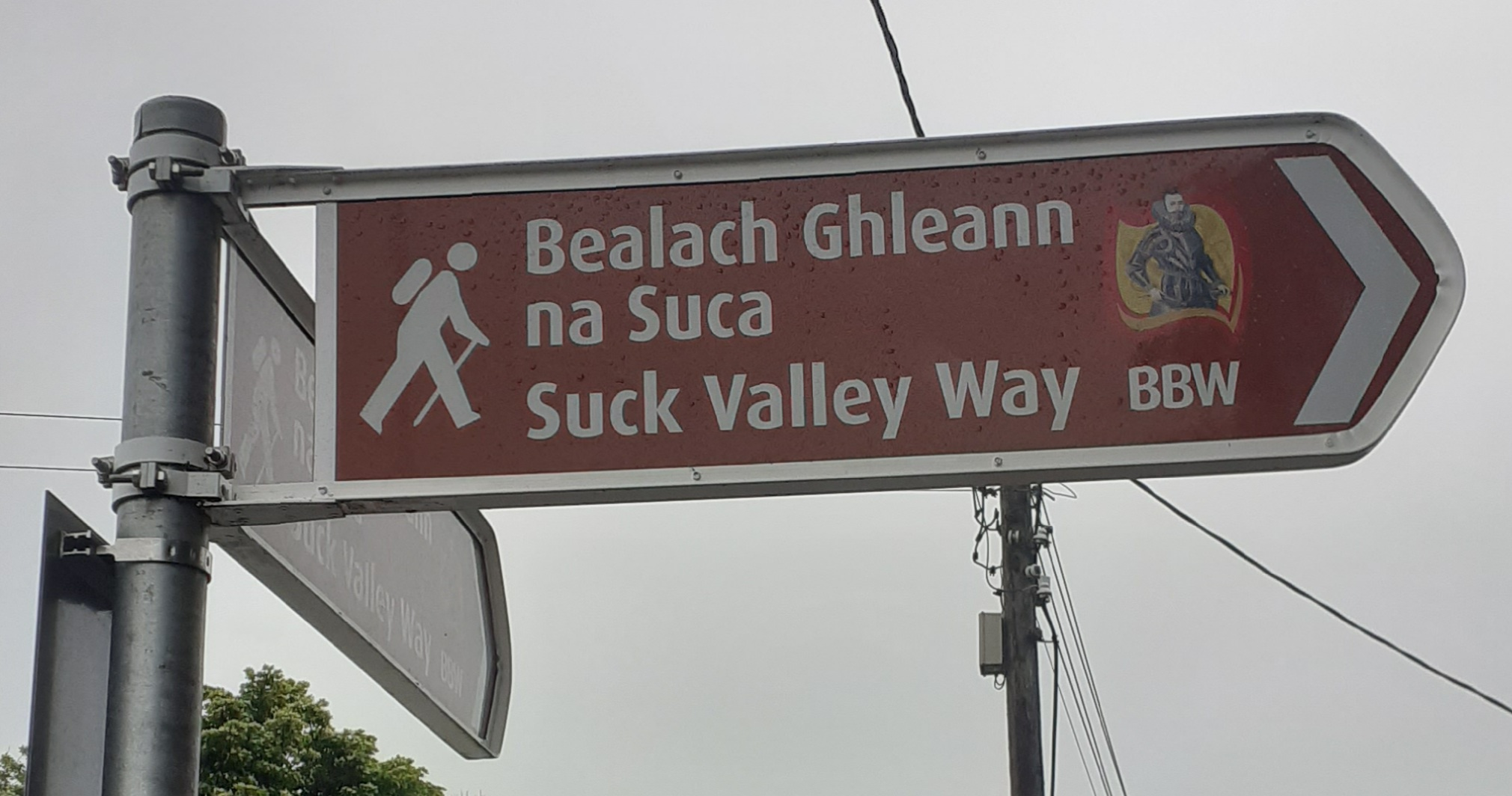
Sign for the Suck Valley Way. Castlerea serves as the trailhead for the walk

Amenities in the town include Castlerea golf club, established in 1905 and moved to its current location in 1907. It is a 9-hole course. There is an outdoor swimming pool, a playground, a public library, a soccer pitch and a Gaelic Athletic Association (GAA) pitch at O'Rourke Park. The GAA club also owns a squash court and a handball court in the town. The Neighbourhood Youth Project (NYP) is a social venue for teenagers in the town. St Patrick's Church (built in 1896) is the Catholic church of the town.

The demesne is a large public park accessible off Main Street and home to some trees planted by notable figures, including former US ambassador to Ireland Jean Kennedy Smith. The town serves as the trailhead for the Suck Valley Way, with the 105-kilometre long trail beginning and ending in the town. Castlerea also serves as the trailhead for the Lung Lough Gara Way. Also, the Beara-Breifne Way also passes through the town.

Castlerea Prison opened in 1996. As of 2022, it had a capacity of 340 inmates.

== Education ==
The schools in the town are all located in the same area; they include two primary schools (St Anne's Convent National School and St Paul's Boys National School), St Michael's Special Needs School (which serves all ages), and Castlerea Community School (for second-level students). Castlerea Community School instructs approximately 500 students. It provides Leaving Certificate Applied classes as well as the Junior Certificate and Leaving Certificate state examinations.

== Transport ==
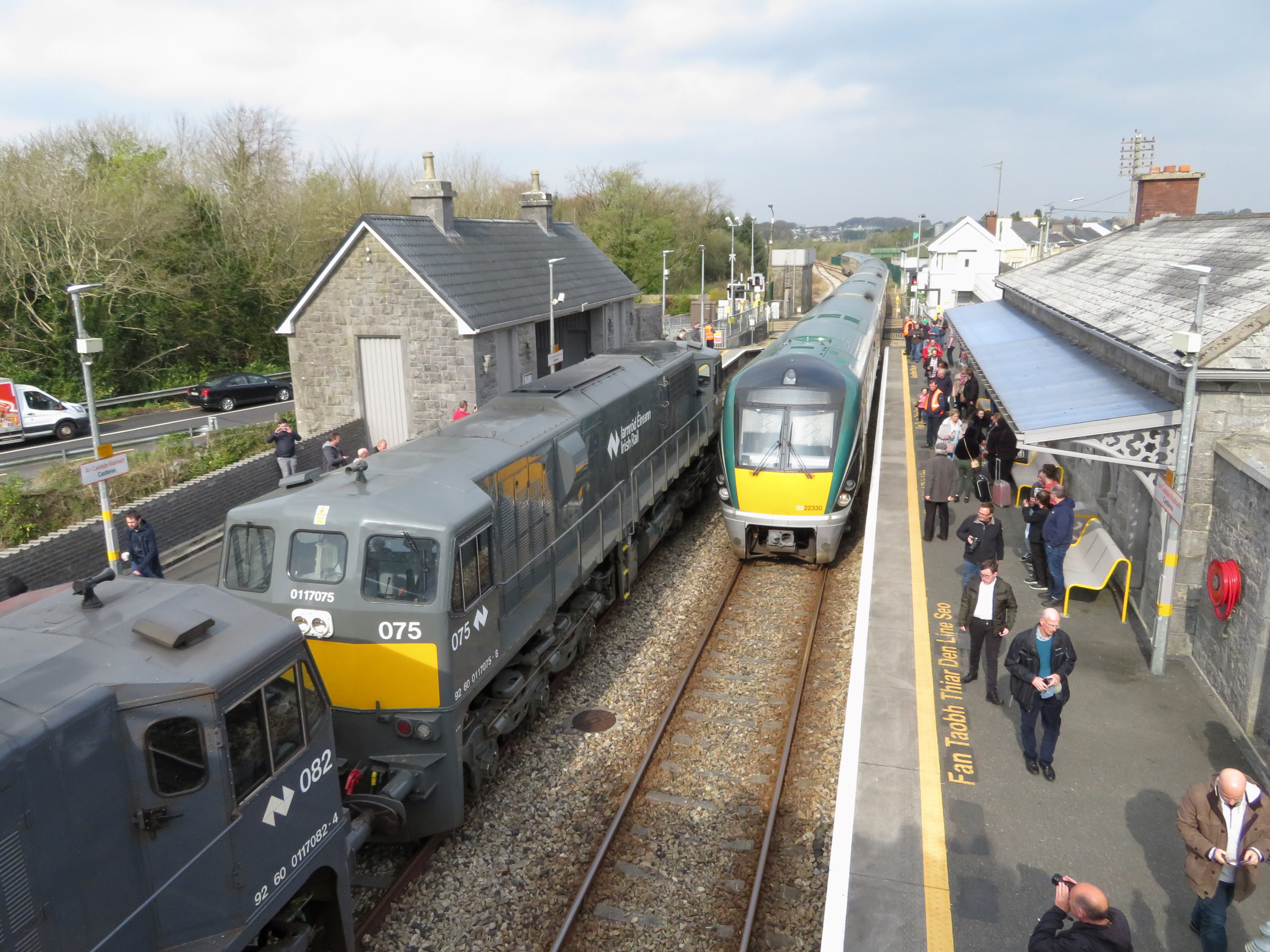
Castlerea Railway Station

The main road through the town is the national secondary road N60, from Roscommon town onward to County Mayo. Other roads include the R361 to Boyle and the R377 to Castleplunket.

The Castlerea railway station opened on 15 November 1860. The railway station resides on the Westport-Dublin main line and connects to Dublin Heuston, Ballina and Westport.

== People ==
- John F. Cryan, U.S. politician, was born in Castlerea.
- Thomas Finnegan, former Catholic Bishop of Killala, was born in the village of Cloonfellive near Castlerea.
- Luke 'Ming' Flanagan, former TD, and now an MEP, comes from Castlerea.
- Gerry Gannon, builder and property developer, is a native of Castlerea.
- John Gunning, sports journalist working in Japan
- Aidan Heavey arrived in England from Castlerea in 1993 and became chief executive of Tullow Oil and one of Britain's most influential Irish businessmen.
- Dr Douglas Hyde, the first President of Ireland and founder of the Gaelic League, was born at Longford House in Castlerea.
- Aoife O'Rourke, boxer, 2025 World Championship gold medalist, 2019 European Championship gold medalist, competed at the 2020 and 2024 Olympics, double Olympian, Castlerea native.
- Lisa O'Rourke, boxer, 2022 World Championship gold medalist, Castlerea native.
- Stephen Rochford, GAA player and manager from County Mayo, previously worked at the bank in Castlerea.
- John Waters, former journalist and author of several books including 'Jiving at the Crossroads', was born and raised on Main Street in Castlerea.
- Sir William Wilde, a surgeon, historian and father of Oscar Wilde, was born in Castlerea in 1815.
- Dr Matthew Young, a Bishop of Clonfert ca. 1798, a natural philosopher, and a mathematician was a native of Castlerea.

== Gallery ==
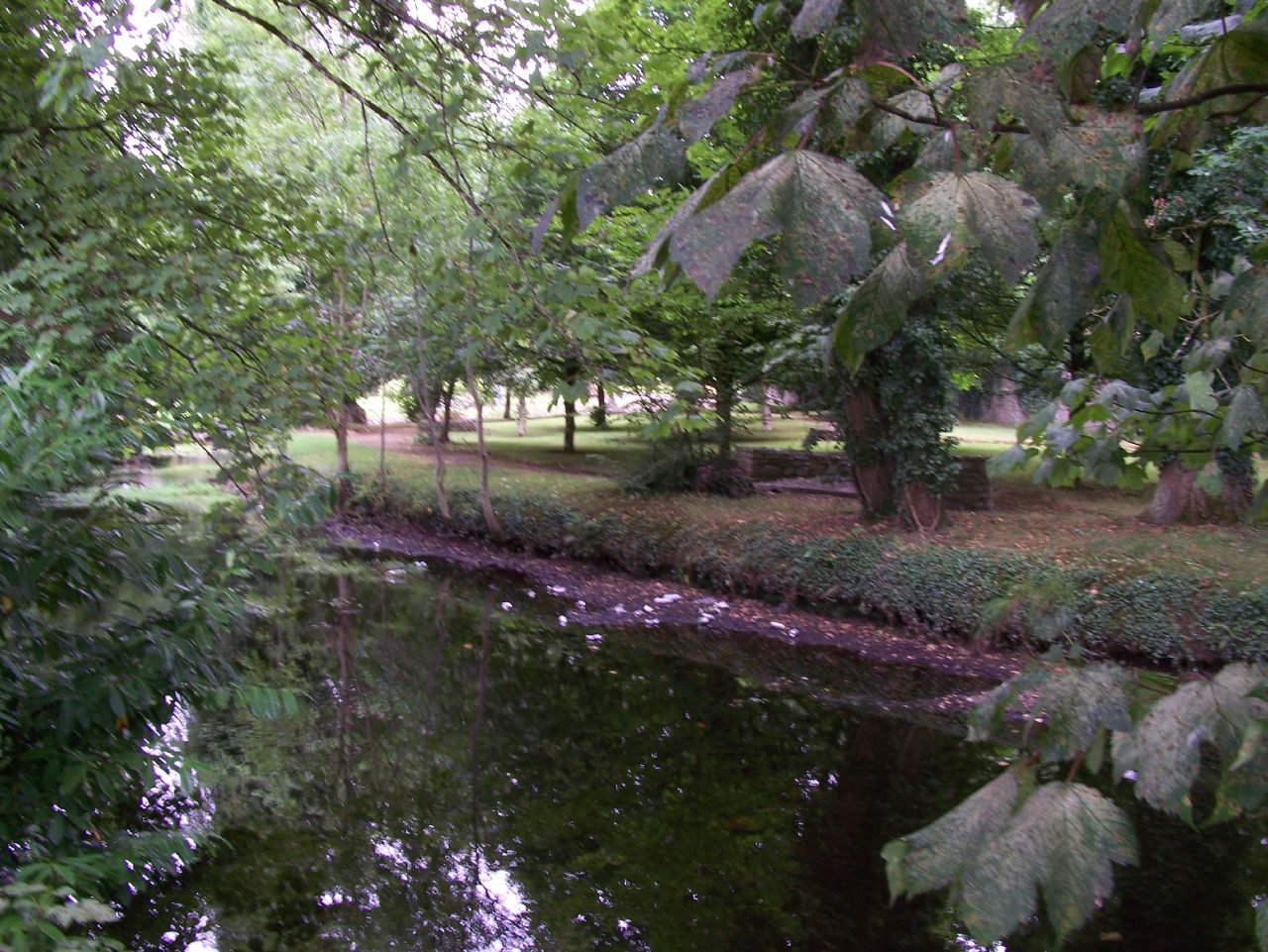
Castlerea Demesne

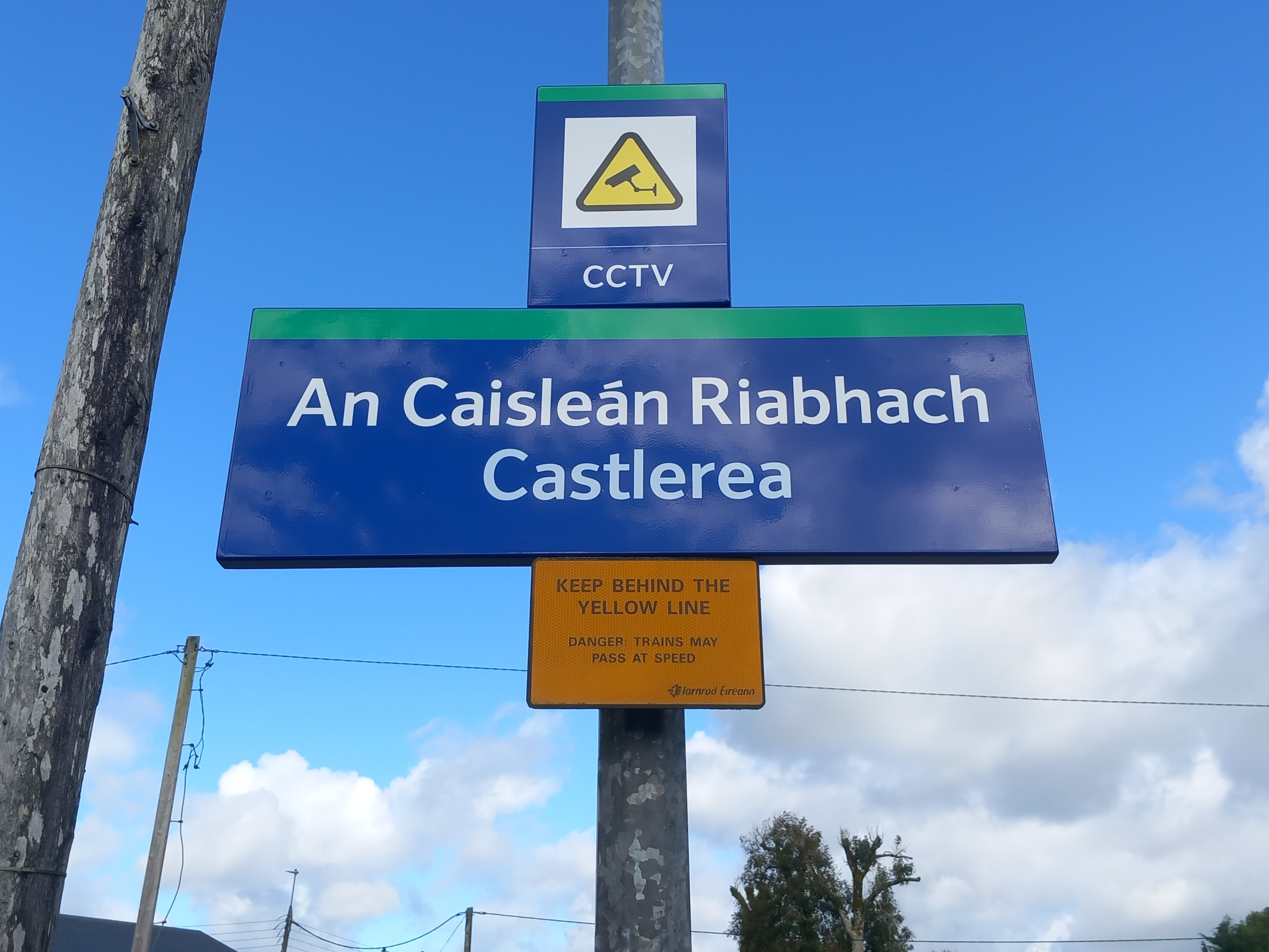
Castlerea Train Station bilingual sign

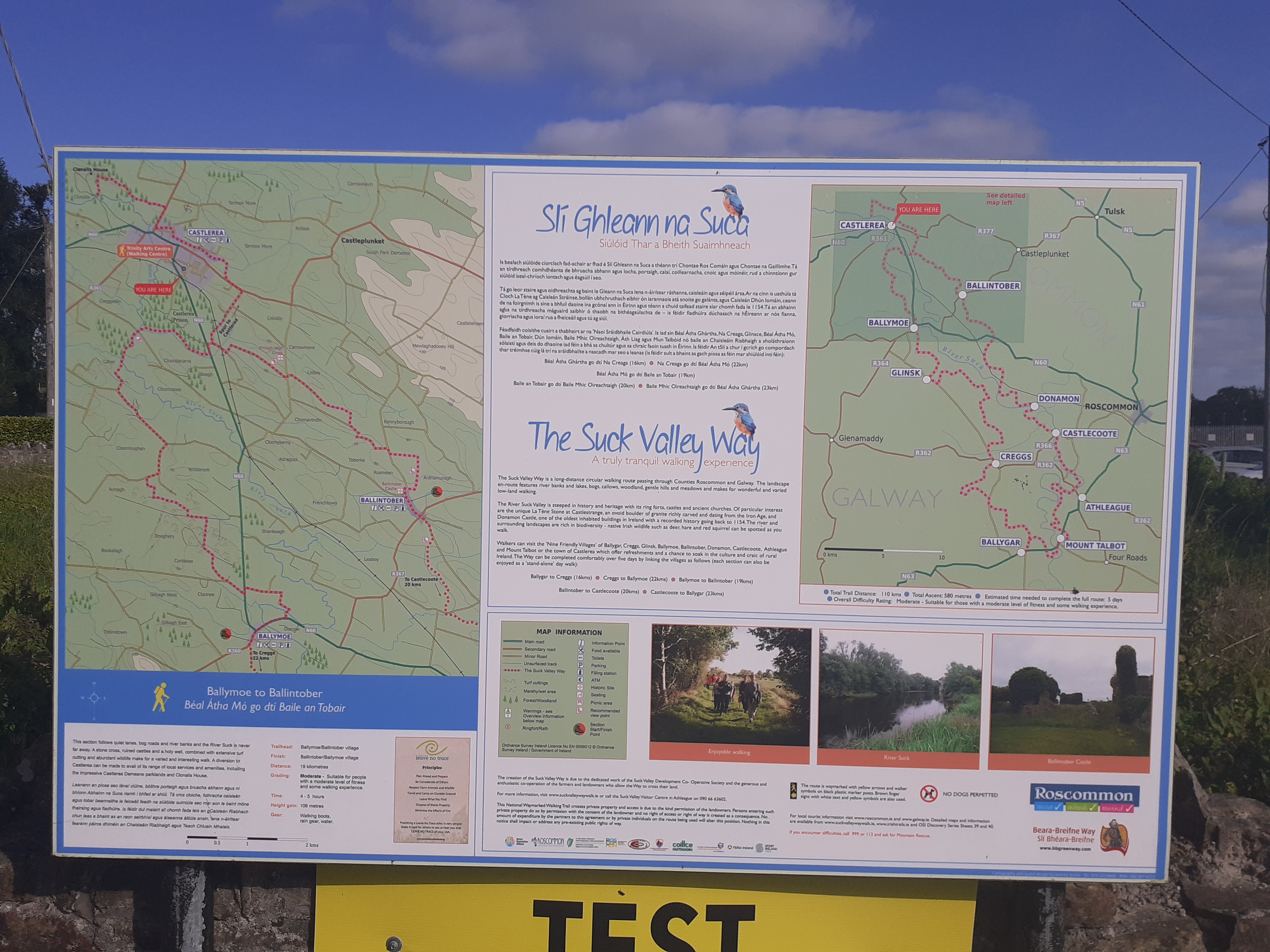
Suck Valley Way Castlerea bilingual information point

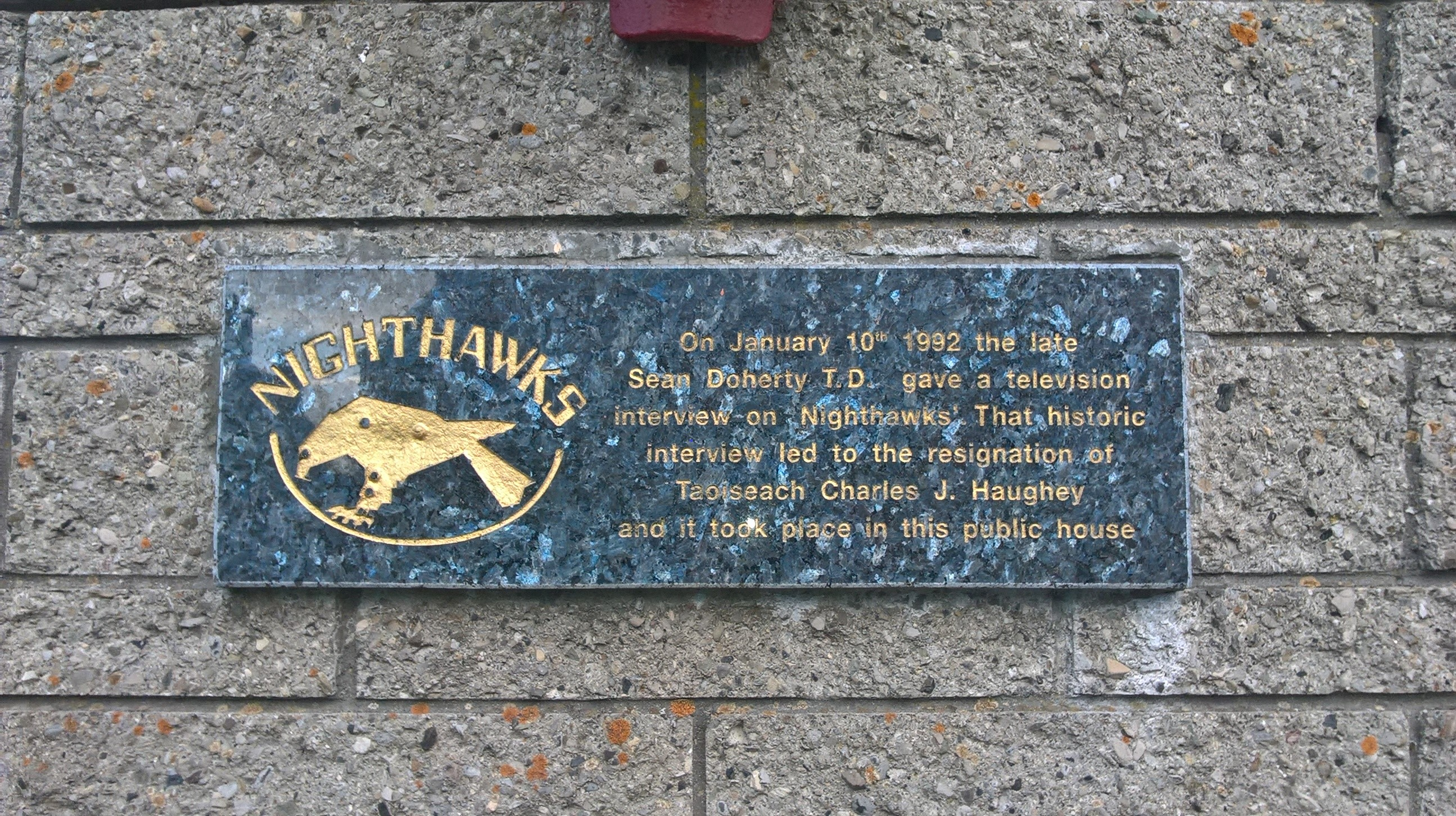
Plaque at Hells Kitchen Bar and Restaurant

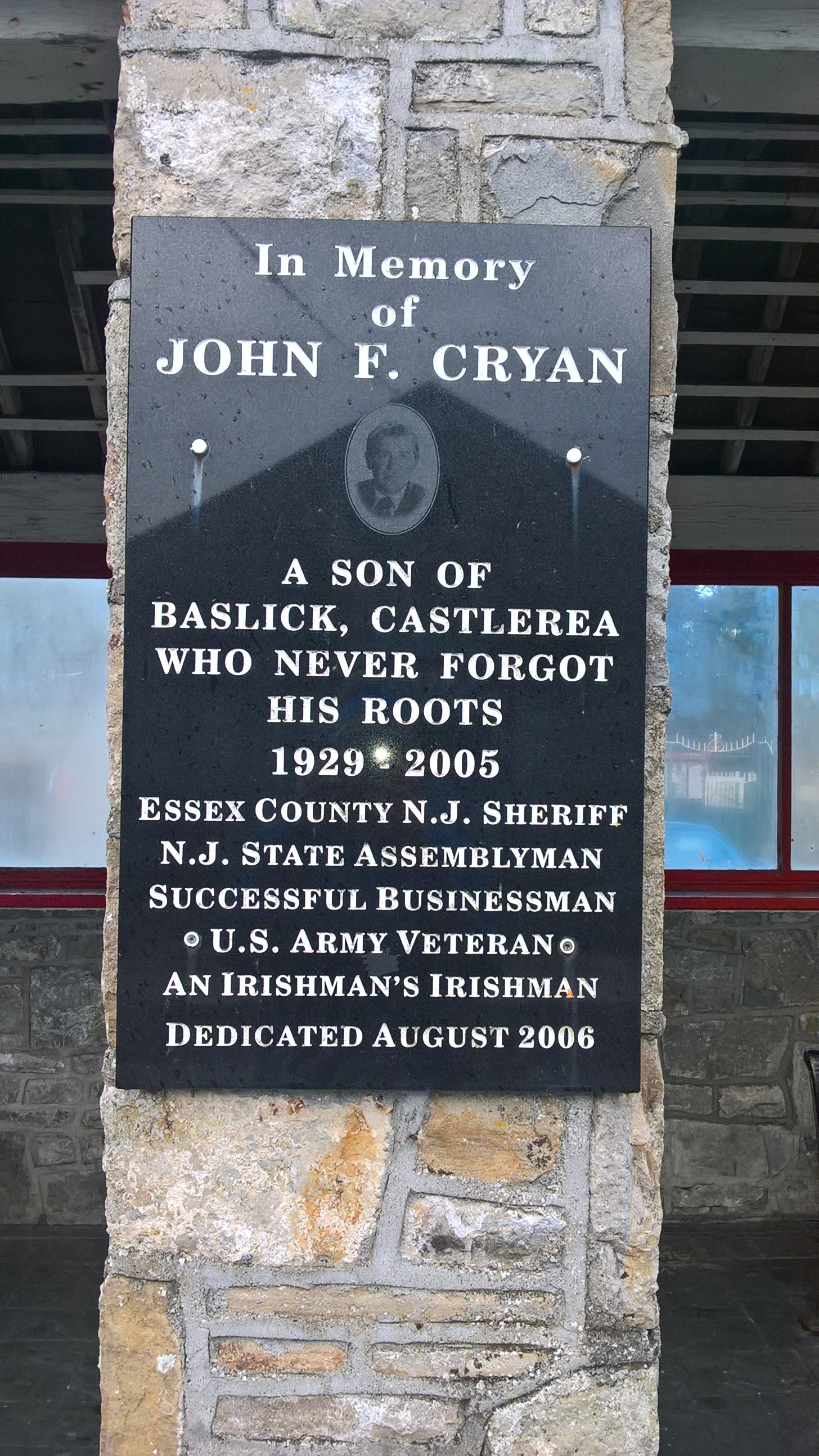
Plaque in honour of John F. Cryan in Castlerea

== Twinning ==
Castlerea is twinned with:

- Newark, New Jersey, United States.
- Soulac-sur-Mer, France.

== See also ==
- List of towns and villages in Ireland
- Market Houses in Ireland
- Castlerea Prison
