= Hymany Way =

Trail in County Galway, Ireland

- Length: 50 km (31 mi)
- Location: County Galway, Ireland
- Designation: National Waymarked Trail
- Trailheads: Portumna, Aughrim
- Use: Hiking
- Difficulty: Easy
- Season: Any

The Hymany Way is a long-distance trail in County Galway, Ireland. It is 50 kilometres (31 miles) long and begins in Portumna and ends in Aughrim. It is typically completed in two days. It is designated as a National Waymarked Trail by the National Trails Office of the Irish Sports Council and is managed by the Aughrim Development Company Limited. The trail was developed with funding assistance from the NTR Foundation, a philanthropic organisation of NTR plc. It was officially opened on 24 September 2010 by Councillor Jimmy McClearn, Mayor of County Galway. It is planned to extend the trail from Aughrim to Ballygar where it will join with the Suck Valley Way.

Starting in Portumna, the trail follows the banks of the River Shannon before turning inland at the townland of Friarsland, near Eyrecourt, to reach Clonfert. From Clonfert, it crosses bogland to the townland of Cloonascragh. On the final approach to Aughrim, it passes the site of the Battle of Aughrim.

The Hymany Way forms part of the Beara-Breifne Way, a walking and cycling route under development, intended to run from the Beara Peninsula, County Cork to Breifne, County Leitrim following the line of Donal Cam O'Sullivan Beare's march in the aftermath of the Battle of Kinsale in 1602.
