= Ormond Way =

Walking and cycling route in Counties Tipperary and Galway

- Location: Counties Tipperary and Galway, Ireland
- Trailheads: Upperchurch, Portumna
- Use: Hiking, cycling
- Season: Any

The Ormond Way is a walking and cycling route in development between Upperchurch in County Tipperary and Portumna in County Galway. It forms one of the stages of the Beara-Breifne Way, a walking and cycling route between the Beara Peninsula, County Cork and Blacklion, County Cavan, following the line of Donal Cam O'Sullivan Beare’s march of 1602.
