= Oldthort =

Townland in Portumna, County Galway, Ireland

Coordinates: 53.101°N 8.251°W

Oldthort or Oultort (Irish: Olltóir) is a townland near Portumna, County Galway, Ireland, mainly along the Tynagh Road. Oultort townland has an area of 1.86 square kilometres (0.72 sq mi), and had a population of 70 people as of the 2011 census.
