= Cavan Way =

Trail in County Cavan, Ireland

- Length: 22 km (14 mi)
- Location: County Cavan, Ireland
- Designation: National Waymarked Trail
- Trailheads: Blacklion, Dowra
- Use: Hiking
- Elevation gain/loss: +330 m (1,083 ft)
- Highest point: Giant's Grave (260 metres (850 ft))
- Difficulty: Moderate
- Season: Any
- Surface: Roads, river paths and moorland

The Cavan Way (Irish: Slí an Cabhán) is a long-distance trail in County Cavan, Ireland. It is 22 kilometres (14 miles) long and begins in Blacklion and ends in Dowra. It is typically completed in one day. It is designated as a National Waymarked Trail by the National Trails Office of the Irish Sports Council and is managed by Cavan County Council. The trail was devised by a local man, Harold Johnston, and set up by the Blacklion Community Council and the Cavan County Development Team between 1984 and 1985.

From Blacklion, the Way climbs into the hills above the village, looking over Upper and Lower Lough MacNean, before passing along the outskirts of The Cavan Burren and past the Giant's Grave, an ancient passage tomb and the highest point on the trail. The route descends and passes the Moneygashel crossroads, where the remains of a sweat house may be found. The route then passes the Shannon Pot, the small pool which is the source of the River Shannon. After following the banks of the Shannon for a few kilometres, the Way reaches a road which leads to the end of the trail at Dowra.

The Cavan Way provides a connection between the Leitrim Way at Dowra and the Ulster Way at Blacklion. It forms part of the Beara-Breifne Way, a walking and cycling route under development, intended to run from the Beara Peninsula, County Cork to Breifne, County Leitrim following the line of Donal Cam O'Sullivan Beare's march in the aftermath of the Battle of Kinsale in 1602.
