= Multeen Way =

Long-distance trail in County Tipperary, Ireland

- Length: 36.7 km (23 mi)
- Location: County Tipperary, Ireland
- Designation: National Waymarked Trail
- Trailheads: Tipperary Town, Upperchurch
- Use: Hiking
- Highest point: 440 metres (1,444 ft)
- Season: Any
- Website: http://www.multeentourism.com/multeen.html

The Multeen Way is a long-distance trail in County Tipperary, Ireland. It is 36.7 kilometres (23 miles) long and begins in Tipperary Town and ends in Upperchurch. It is typically completed in one day. It is designated as a National Waymarked Trail by the National Trails Office of the Irish Sports Council.

The trail proceeds in a southerly direction from Milestone to Tipperary through the countryside of the Golden Vale and the Red Hills, via Cappawhite and Donohill. The route follows roads to Donohill, passing the site of the Battle of Sulcoit, before crossing countryside on paths and tracks to reach Cappawhite, via Shandangan Fens and Greenfield Nature Park. From Cappawhite, the trail climbs into the Red Hills following mountain paths above the village of Hollyford crossing the former territories of the Rapparee outlaws of the 17th century. Passing the village of Milestone, the trail finishes in Upperchurch.

The Multeen Way forms part of the Beara-Breifne Way, a walking and cycling route under development, intended to run from the Beara Peninsula, County Cork to Breifne, County Leitrim following the line of Donal Cam O'Sullivan Beare's march in the aftermath of the Battle of Kinsale in 1602. It connects with the Ballyhoura Way in Tipperary Town and the Ormond Way in Upperchurch.
