= Ballyhoura Way =

Long-distance trail in Ireland

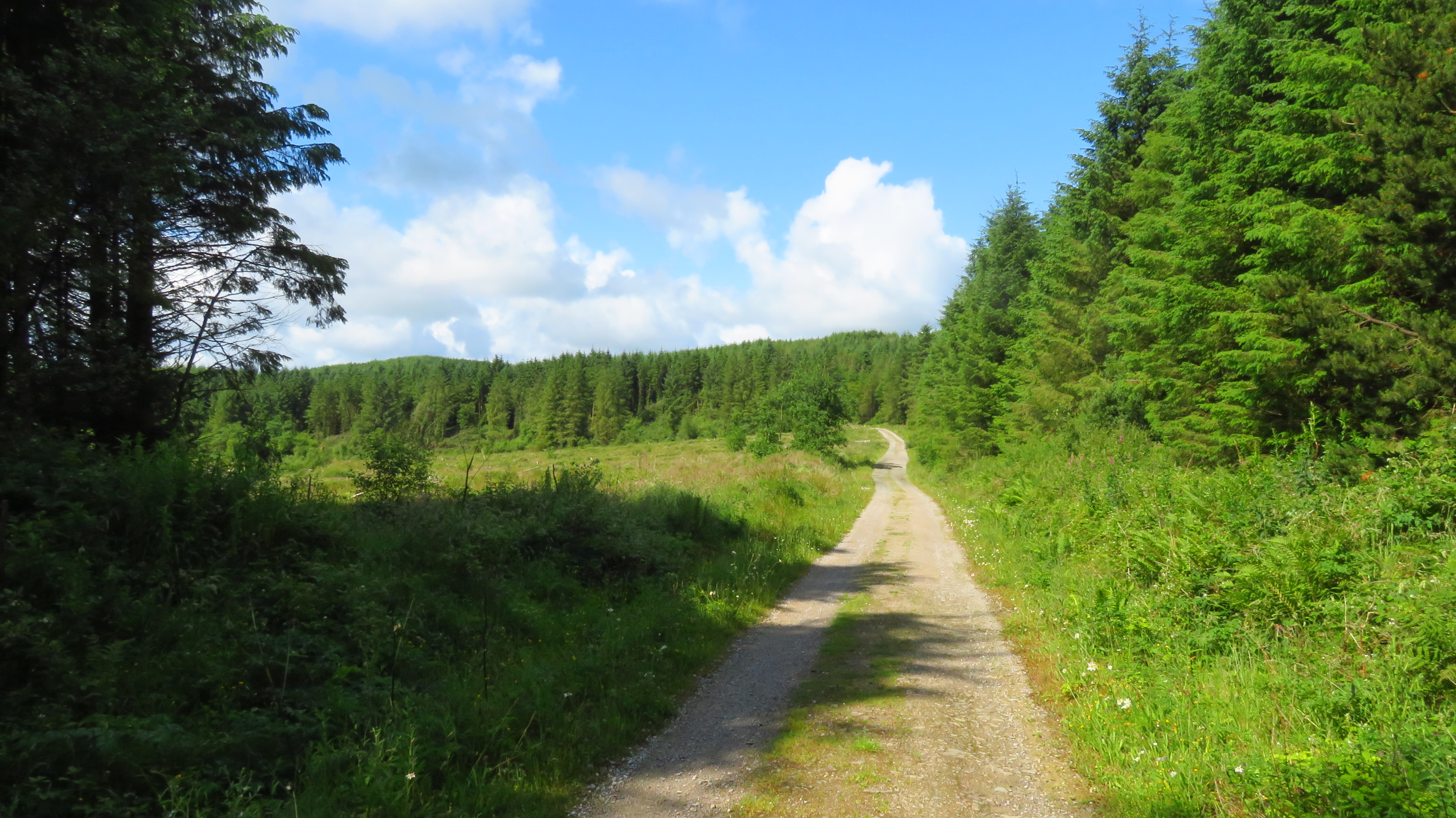
- Ballyhoura Way south of The Pinnacle, Slievereagh
- Length: 89 kilometres (55 miles)
- Location: Ireland
- Designation: National Waymarked Trail
- Trailheads: St John's Bridge, County Cork; Limerick Junction, County Tipperary
- Use: Hiking
- Elevation gain/loss: 1,560 m (5,118 ft)
- Difficulty: Moderate
- Season: Any

The Ballyhoura Way (Irish: Slí Bhealach Eabhra) is a long-distance trail in Ireland. The trail is 89 kilometres (55 miles) long; it begins at St John's Bridge, near Kanturk, County Cork and ends at Limerick Junction, County Tipperary, and is typically completed in four days. It is designated as a National Waymarked Trail by the National Trails Office of the Irish Sports Council and is managed by Ballyhoura Fáilte. The trail was opened in April 1994 by President Mary Robinson.

== Route ==
The initial stage starts at St John's Bridge, a crossroads 6.5 kilometres (4.0 miles) north of the town of Kanturk, and follows minor roads to Ballyhea via Liscarroll. From Ballyhea, the trail crosses the Ballyhoura Mountains to the village of Ballyorgan. The Way continues through the mountains to Galbally via Kilfinane and Ballylanders. From Galbally, it follows the Glen of Aherlow to Tipperary town before following the road to the end of the trail at Limerick Junction.

The Ballyhoura Way forms one of the stages of the Beara-Breifne Way, a walking and cycling route under development, intended to run from the Beara Peninsula, County Cork to Breifne, County Leitrim, following the line of Donal Cam O'Sullivan Beare's march in the aftermath of the Battle of Kinsale in 1602. It connects with the Multeen Way in Tipperary town.
