= Timothy Joyce =

Timothy Joyce (1868–1947), was an Irish Roman Catholic priest, Monsignor and parish priest of Portumna, 1919–1947.

== Biography ==
Joyce was born in Portumna on 8 August 1868. He was educated at the Christian Brothers School, Nenagh; St. Brendan's Seminary, Loughrea; Mungreat College, Limerick. He was ordained in St. Bridget's church, Portumna, by Bishop of Clonfert, Dr. Healy, in 1896. He was immediately made parish curate, serving under Fr. Joseph Corcoran.

In 1904 he was one of two Clonfert priests who travelled to the U.S. to collect funds for the construction of a cathedral in Loughrea; "members of the Joyce family who had previously emigrated to the United States helped greatly in this task by organising fundraising events." On his return he served briefly in Ballymacward and then Ballinasloe.

One result of his efforts in the USA was a recommendation to the bishop that, vacancy arising, he should be appointed parish priest in his home parish of Portumna. This came to pass upon the death of Fr. Corcoran in December 1919.

In 1922 Monsignor Joyce played a fundamental part in the purchase of Garbally House and estate from the Clancarthy family; it was converted into the Diocesan College for Clonfert, Joyce giving the first mass in it on 16 August 1922. "The timing of the purchase was of crucial importance as plans were at an advanced stage by one of the parties involved in the Civil War (see Irish Civil War) to have the house burnt down to prevent the opposing faction from using it as a stronghold."

In Portumna, Joyce instigated the erection of a new Town Hall, aided the establishment of an Electric Light Company, established a Civic League, and renamed the town streets, all of which had footpaths cleaned, newly-laid out. His contribution to the town—recognised "as a model town and one of the neatest and tidiest in the country"—led to Pope Pius XI granting him the title of Domestic Prelate in 1928.

Joyce was involved in several other local projects, such as the establishment of the town's Vocational School in 1934, the establishment of the fire service, and the very successful Portumna Agricultural and Home Industries Show in the 1930s and 1940s. Due to emigration, the Portumna Brass and Reed Band (established 1907) had declined, until Monsignor Joyce reorganised it and appointed a new bandmaster. He established the Shannon Development Association in 1945 to utilise the resources of Lough Derg for the town and its neighbours.

Joyce died on Thursday 20 February 1947 at the parochial house (which he built), Portumna.
