= Wilfrid Merydith Capper =

Wilfrid Merydith Capper (12 July 1905 – 27 July 1998) was a countryside campaigner in Northern Ireland. Educated at Bangor Grammar School, Methodist College, and Queen's University. Capper's career in the forestry division of the Ministry of Agriculture fitted well with his interest in the countryside.

== Whitepark Bay ==
In 1931, Capper was involved in the creation of a Northern Ireland branch of the youth hostel movement, the first hostel being established at Whitepark Bay in County Antrim. It was the impending threat to the bay from development that lead hostellers, including Capper to purchase the bay and present it to the National Trust.

== The Ulster Way ==
Much of Capper's time and effort was spent in the creation of the Ulster Way, a long-distance walking route connecting various areas of outstanding natural beauty.

== Awards ==
In 1975, Capper received the MBE. He was later awarded the Sir John Hunt Award for services to the countryside for his work in establishing the Ulster Federation of Rambling Clubs.
