= Portumna =

Town in County Galway, Ireland

Portumna Irish: Port Omna
- Town
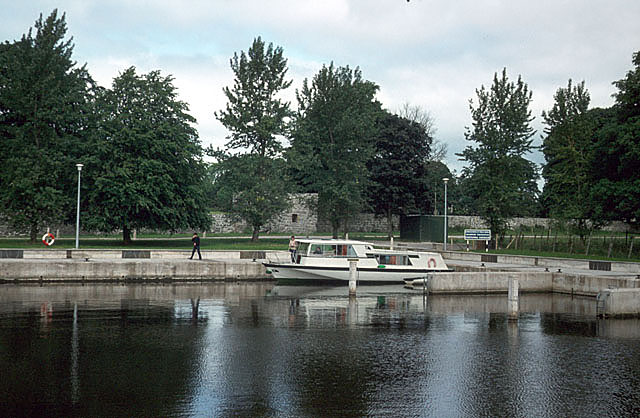
- Portumna harbour

- Location in Ireland
- Coordinates: 53°05′21″N 8°13′08″W
- Country: Ireland
- Province: Connacht
- County: County Galway
- Townland: Portumna
- Civil parish: Lickmolassy
- Elevation: 48 m (157 ft)

Population (2022)
  - Total: 1,690
- Time zone: UTC+0 (WET)
  - Summer (DST): UTC-1 (IST (WEST))
- Irish Grid Reference: M853042
- Website: www.visitportumna.com

Portumna (Irish: Port Omna- meaning 'the landing place of the oak') is a market town in the south-east of County Galway, Ireland, on the border with and linked by a bridge to County Tipperary. The town is located to the west of the point where the River Shannon enters Lough Derg. This historic crossing point over the River Shannon between counties Tipperary and Galway has a long history of bridges and ferry crossings. On the south-western edge of the town lie Portumna Castle and Portumna forest park.

== History ==
=== Portumna Bridge ===
Portumna is served with a five-span road bridge over the Shannon. This was designed by C. E. Stanier of London, and completed in 1911, with a central section resting on Hayes's Island which divides the river into two channels. The steel structure of the main bridge and pivoting swing bridge over the navigation channel are of technical and engineering interest, and it is the largest early-twentieth-century swing bridge in Europe. The opening section was replaced in October 2008.

The Shannon at this point consists of two channels divided by Hayes Island, the one on the County Tipperary side being about 79 m (260 ft) wide, and that on the Galway side being about 73 m (240 ft) wide. Each channel is spanned by three pairs of mild-steel plate girders, either 24 m (80 ft) or 27 m (90 ft) in length, resting on 3 m (9 ft) diameter concrete-filled cast-iron cylinders.

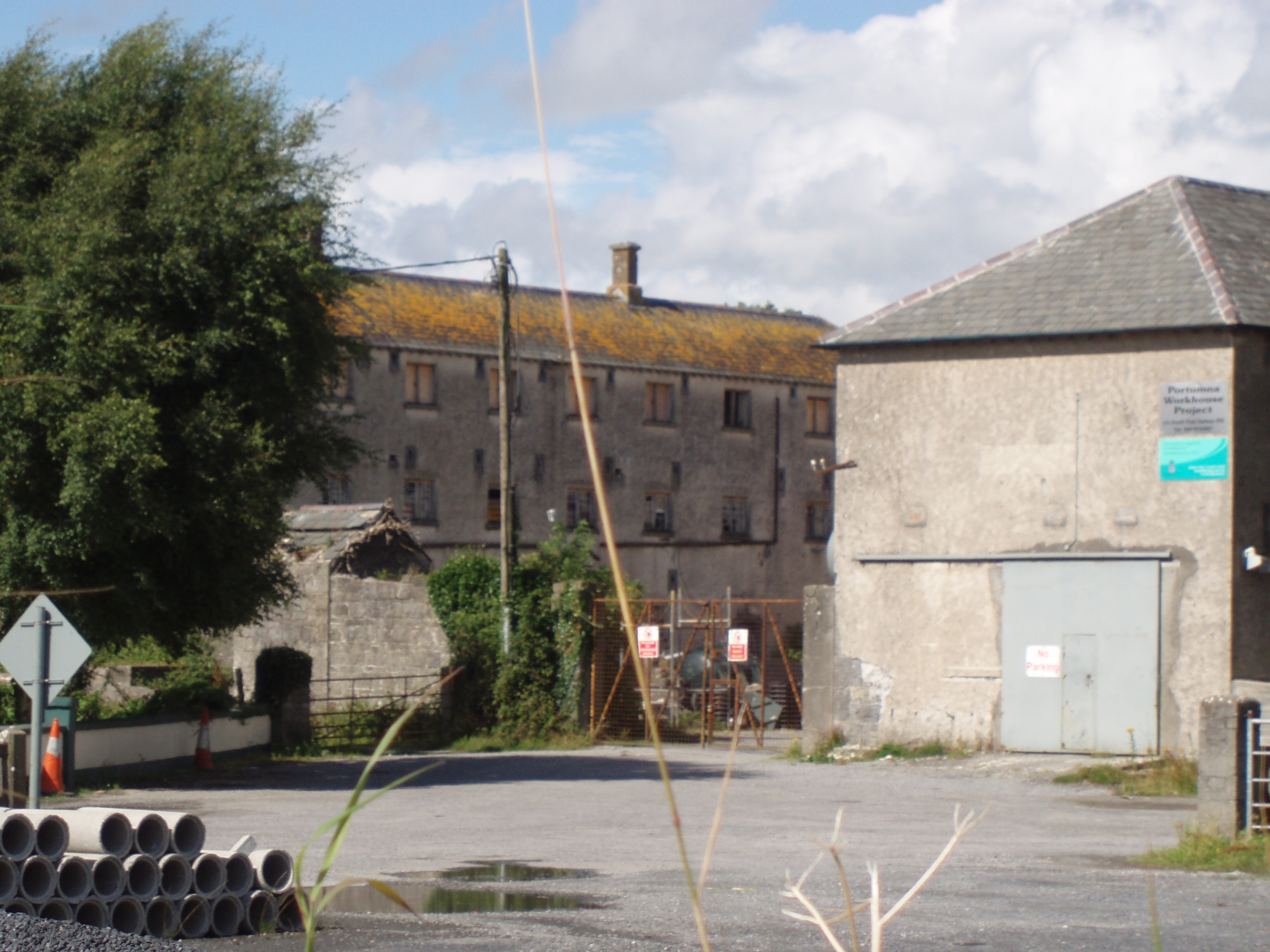
Portumna Workhouse from the Ballinasloe road

=== Workhouse ===
A number of Poor Law Unions were set up across Ireland during the Great Famine. The Portumna Union was formally declared on 22 February 1850, covering an area of 121 square miles (310 km^{2}) as a subdivision of the Ballinasloe and Loughrea unions.

The Portumna Union workhouse was erected on a 9 acres (40,000 m^{2}) site 0.5 miles (800 m) to the north-east of Portumna. Designed by the Poor Law Commissioners' architect George Wilkinson, the building was intended to accommodate 600 inmates who were badly affected by the lack of both employment and food at the time. Its construction cost £6,700 plus £1,175 for fittings etc., but in recent years the workhouse site has been left semi-derelict. One of the front blocks is, however, used by a local council depot. The Irish Workhouse Centre, opened in the old Portumna Workhouse during summer 2011, is the only centre telling the history of workhouses in Ireland.

=== Castle ===
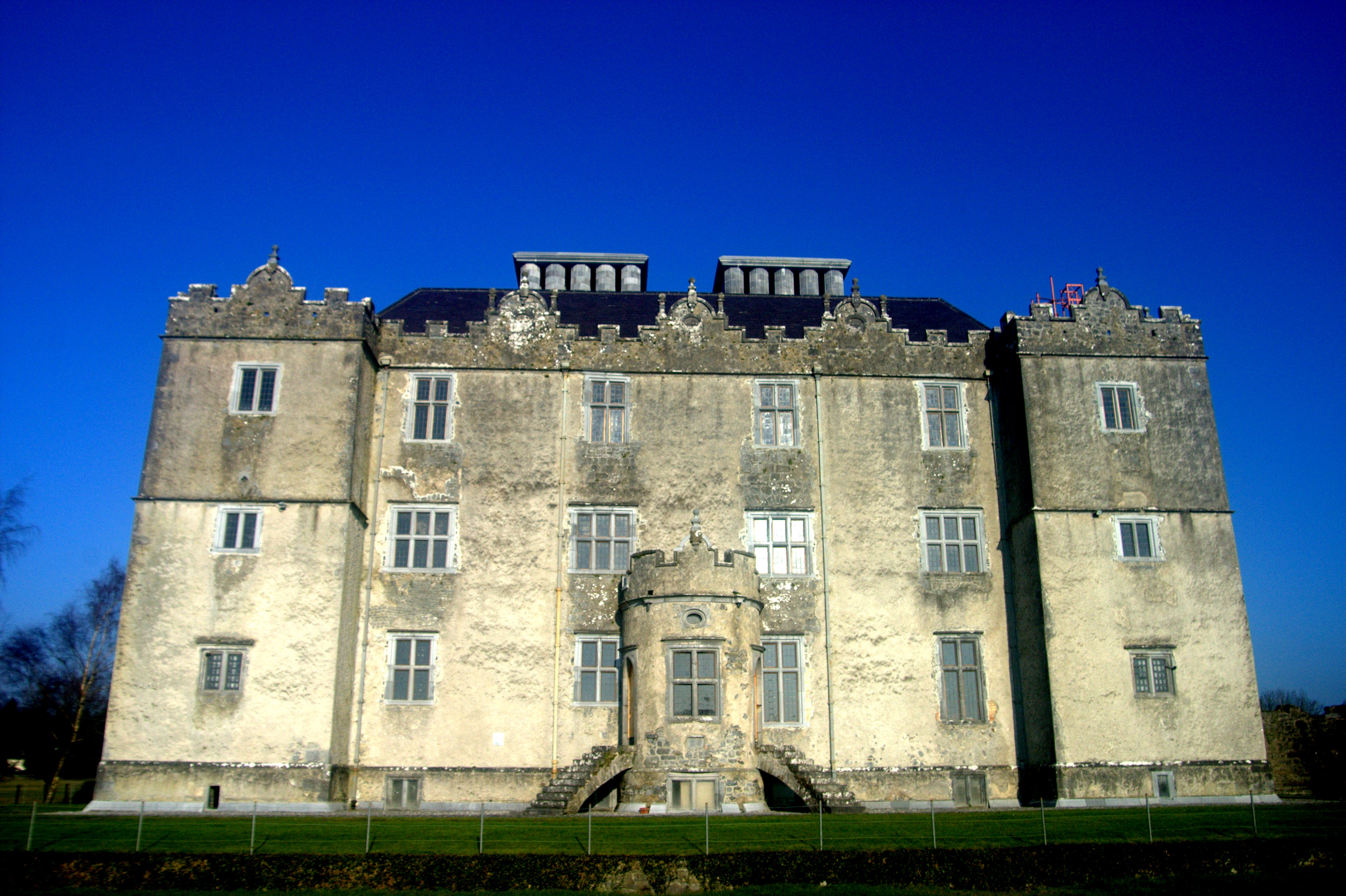
Portumna Castle

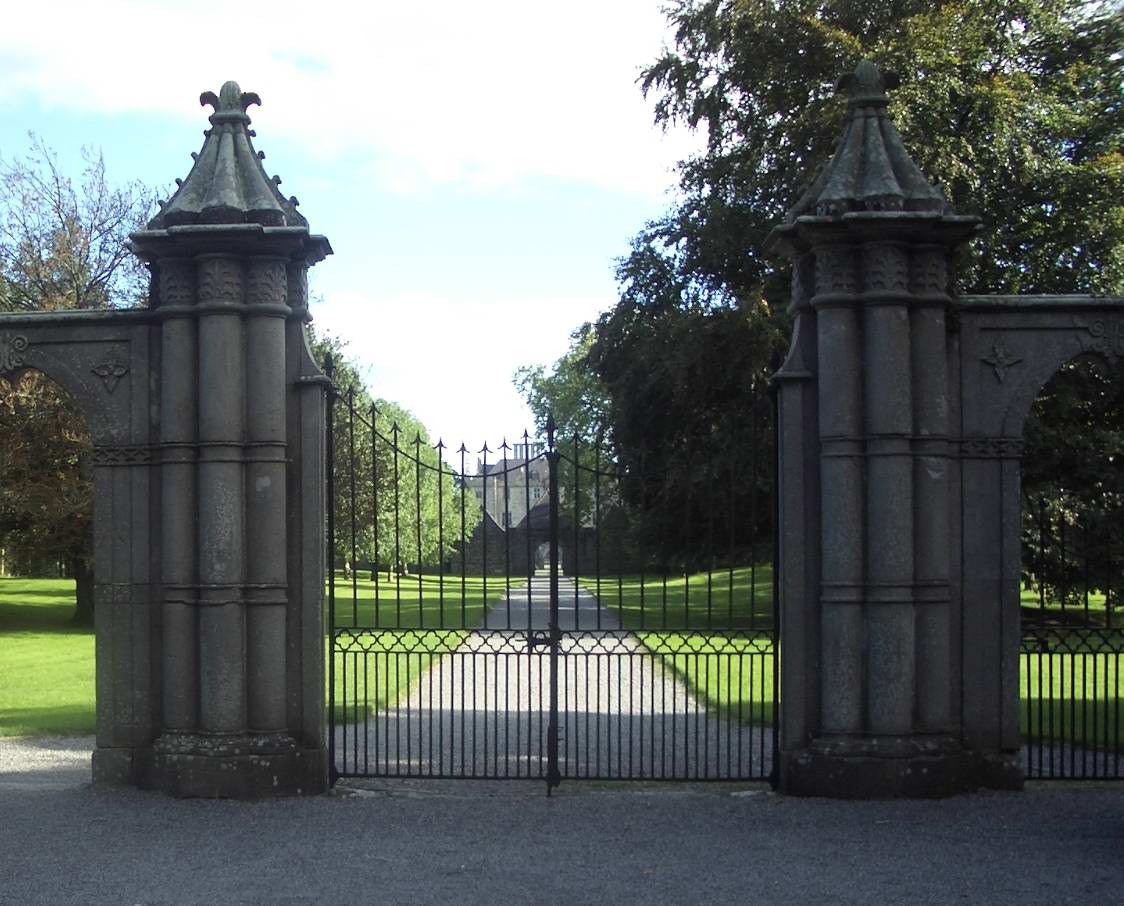
Portumna Castle gates

The town is noted for Portumna Castle and for the lords that lived there. The castle is actually a semi-fortified house and was built before 1618 by Richard Burke or de Burgo, the 4th Earl of Clanricarde. It was the main seat of the de Burgo family for over 200 years, until it was gutted by fire in 1826.

The castle is located about 200 metres North of Portumna (or 'New') Harbour on Lough Derg, with Portumna Forest Park to the west and the town of Portumna about 300 metres to the north and east.

Following conservation and restoration work, the ground floor of the castle is now open to the public from April–September daily and from September–October on weekends only. The conservation works on other parts of the castle are ongoing. To the north of the castle are formal, geometrically laid out gardens. The castle also includes the restored 17th-century walled kitchen garden.

As with many historic buildings a number of local legends have grown up around the castle. One local legend goes that a child fell out of the upper windows. An Irish Wolfhound raced over, broke the child's fall and saved the child. A marker stone now rests on the site. The bones of the dog, called "Fury" according to a marker stone erected at the time of his death, have been found during excavations, and are now on display in the castle itself. However, the veracity of this is doubted. Amongst the oldest families of the area, whose histories run alongside that of the castle, the legend is that the Earl's wolfhound died during the fire, on the balcony alongside the Earl's daughter.

The Irish National Land League's Land War, a plan of campaign to force landlords to reduce rents, started in Portumna. Hubert de Burgh-Canning, 2nd Marquess of Clanricarde was targeted because of his harsh treatment of his tenants. Clanricarde was quoted as saying "if you think you can intimidate me by shooting my agent, you are mistaken". He demanded that the government offer all the protection to which his property was entitled, which they did. When rent day came in November 1886, 4,000 tenants marched with a brass band past the estate office and to the hotel where a group of nationalist members of parliament decided how much rent was to be paid. The tenants then returned to the estate office and offered their rent, which the officer in charge refused to take as it was lower than the amount the landlord had set. The money was then handed over to the MPs for the defence of the tenants. The MP William O'Brien described it as "an artist in political melodrama". One of the main instigators in this drama was Jeremiah O'Driscoll, affectionately known as "cus". Because of the disturbances in Portumna an 1887 act was brought into effect, the Perpetual Crimes Act, in effect the last Irish crimes act ever to be put on the British statute book.

Today, Portumna Castle is a heritage museum of the Flight of the Wild Geese.

== Tourism ==
=== Portumna Forest Park ===
Portumna Forest Park is located on the southwestern edge of the town, on the northern shore of Lough Derg. The park spans almost 600 hectares (1,500 acres) and formed part of the lands of the Earl of Clanricarde, who was seated at Portumna Castle. It was purchased by the Irish government in 1948 and is now owned by Coillte.

Within the park, there are forest and lakeside walks, car parking and toilet facilities and observation points. There are also a number of bike-friendly trails. The park has the remains of Portumna Abbey, a Cistercian abbey dating from the 15th Century. Adjacent to the park is a marina giving access to the Shannon waterway system.

The forest is mainly coniferous but also contains a wide variety of broadleaved trees, both native and exotic. In addition to woodlands, there are wide open spaces, green fields, scrub, marsh, water and numerous off-shore islands. This inter mix of forest, open area, water and islands gives a wide choice of habitat to support a great variety of flora and fauna.

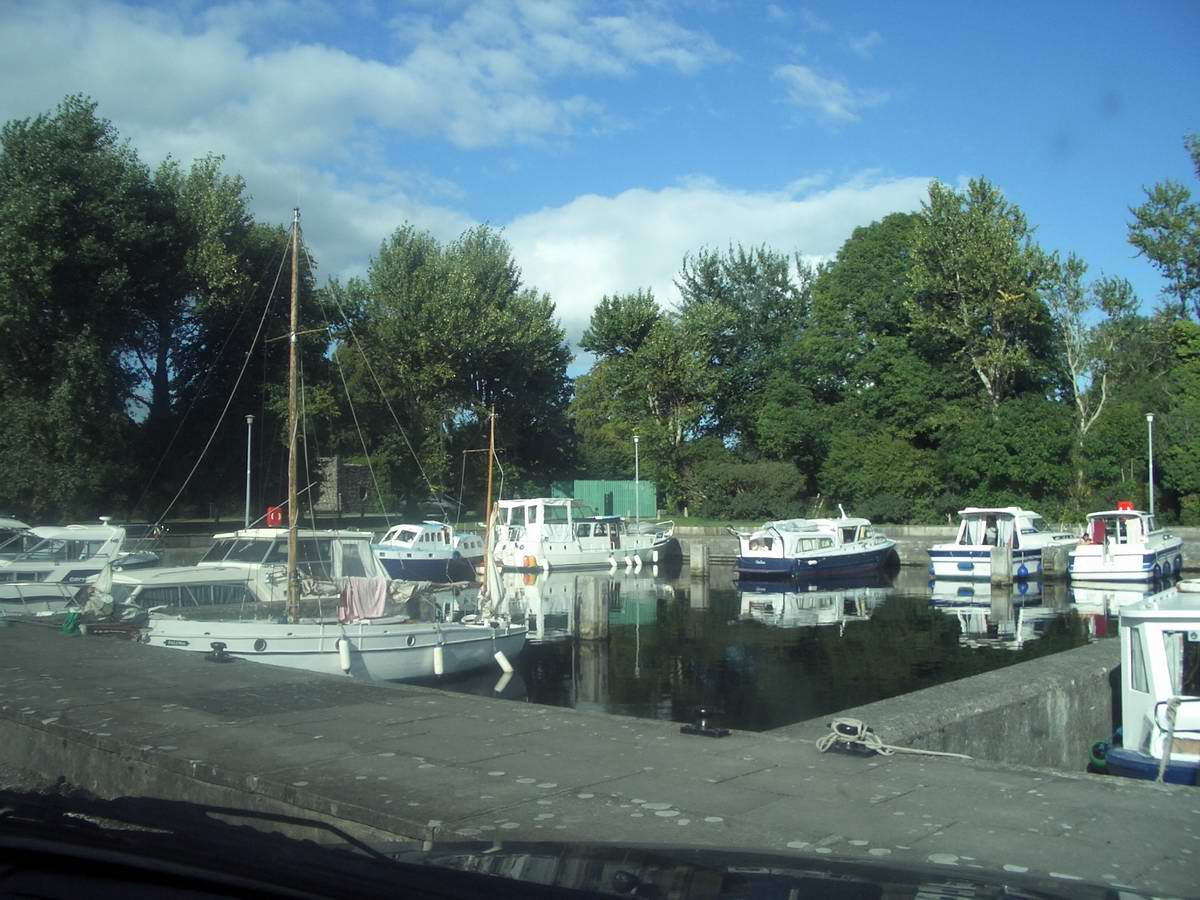
Portumna (or 'New') Harbour

=== Marine tourism ===
Portumna is a tourist destination for boaters, golfers and anglers. The town is at the junction of the River Shannon and Lough Derg, and there are a number of harbours – two of which are on the Portumna side of the river.

These are Connacht Harbour, accessed via the river, which is beside Bridge Road, on the eastern side of the town, and Portumna (or 'New') Harbour which is on the northern shore of Lough Derg beside Castle Avenue, adjacent to the castle and the forest park on the southern edge of the town.

A third private harbour has been recently established on the Tipperary side of the river at Portland House. There are also private moorings at Belle Isle harbour. Pleasure craft can be privately hired at Emerald Star Line cruisers at Connacht Harbour.

=== Walking and cycling trails ===
In addition to trails within the forest park, Portumna is the southern trailhead of the Hymany Way which here forms part of the Beara-Breifne long-distance walking and cycling trail between the Beara Peninsula in County Cork and Blacklion in County Cavan. A free weekly timed 5 km Parkrun takes place on forest paths within the forest park.

== Sport ==
The town is home to the 2006, 2008, 2009 and 2014 All-Ireland Senior Club Hurling Championship winners, Portumna GAA. The hurlers have also won six Galway county titles, in 2003, 2005, 2007, 2008, 2009 and 2013. A number of Portumna players, including Joe Canning, have been members of the Galway senior panel.

While soccer has been played in Portumna in various guises over the years, Portumna Town FC was founded in 2006, with a view to providing organised football for the children of Portumna and the surrounding areas. The club competes in the Midlands Schoolboy League, and league, cup and shield trophies at various age groups have been won over the years. The club has a 3G astro turf facility and in 2013 a senior team was started up to compete in the North Tipperary League.

There are several angling spots near Portumna – a number of which are official match stretches located on the River Shannon itself and the northern shores of Lough Derg. On the river there are two main stretches near Portumna. One is downstream of Portumna and is known locally as the 'lower town stretch' or 'Rogers Island'. The other is upstream of the town and is known as the upper ESB stretch or 'Fairyhill'. The most commonly caught species include pike, perch, bream, roach and hybrids. The River Shannon and Lough Derg also provide for pleasure boating and watersports. During the summer months, sports such as water-skiing and wakeboarding are undertaken in Portumna.

Portumna Bay, Lough Derg, as dusk falls, near the 'Lower Town' Angling stretch on the River Shannon

Portumna Golf Club (founded in 1913) and its 18-hole parkland golf course (par 72), set within the 1,500 acres (6.1 km^{2}) Portumna Forest Park, is located on the western approach to the town, approximately two kilometres from the town centre on the Ennis/Gort road. In 2010, Golf Digest Ireland ranked the course as number 61 out of 100 of the top courses in Ireland. As of 2014, the course was ranked 53rd.

A now annual long-distance running event, the Portumna Forest Marathon, was started in 2010. The event includes both a full and half marathon, along with 50 km and 100 km ultra-marathons. The event staged one of the World Cup trophy series in 2014.

== Jamboree ==
In August 1985 the three Scout Associations in Ireland (CBSI, SAI, and NISC) held a major Jamboree at Portumna to celebrate International Youth Year. Portumna '85 was the first Scout camp involving all three Irish Scouting organisations. It is remembered by both participants and locals as Port-mud-na '85 on account of the muddy conditions that had to be endured by the 10,000 or so participants, caused by the torrential rain which fell during that summer.

== Festivals ==
Portumna holds two festivals each year. The first in late June is the "Portumna's Great Outdoors Festival", a celebration of the many outdoor attractions that Portumna has to offer, which takes place over three days. The second is the Shorelines Arts Festival in late September over four days.

== See also ==
- Stoneyisland Man
- Timothy Joyce
- List of towns and villages in Ireland
- List of abbeys and priories in Ireland (County Galway)
