= Neven Maguire =

Irish celebrity chef and television personality

- Born: 25 November 1973 (age 52); Blacklion, County Cavan, Ulster, Republic of Ireland
- Education: Enniskillen Campus CAFRE
- Culinary career
- Current restaurant(s): McNeans Bistro, Blacklion, County Cavan
- Television show(s): 10 of the Best Neven Cooks Cooking with Love Neven's Food from the Sun, Neven's Portuguese Food Trails
- Website: http://www.macneanrestaurant.com

Neven Maguire is an Irish celebrity chef and television personality from Blacklion, County Cavan in the Irish province of Ulster. He is also the head chef and proprietor of the MacNean House and Restaurant.

Maguire has published and launched several cookbooks and features regularly on television and radio in his native country. He writes a weekly column in the Irish Farmers Journal.

== Biography ==
Neven Maguire was born to Joe and Vera Maguire. He began cooking at the age of twelve in the kitchen of his family restaurant, MacNean's in Blacklion, County Cavan.

The restaurant, purchased by his father, Joe, in 1969, would be greatly affected by The Troubles, being bombed twice and shutting down for more than a decade between 1976 and 1989. He took over the business as Head Chef and Proprietor in 2003.

Following his Junior Certificate, Neven left school to attend Enniskillen College of Food. Upon graduating, Maguire worked in several Michelin starred restaurants in Europe. He commenced his overseas career in Berlin. He also worked in Roscoff Restaurant, Belfast, Northern Ireland (1 Michelin star), The Grand Hotel Restaurant, Berlin, Germany (2 Michelin stars), Lea Linster Restaurant, Luxembourg (2 Michelin stars) and Arzak Restaurant, San Sebastian, Spain (3 Michelin stars).

Neven and his wife, Amelda, are the parents of twins. Amelda nearly died during labour after her heart failed.

He is a practising Roman Catholic.

== Media work ==
Maguire is a regular contributor to The Marian Finucane Show on RTÉ Radio 1 and also writes a weekly column and recipe in the Irish Farmers Journal. He has contributed recipes to the Mayo Advertiser. In 2009, he performed at the National Ploughing Championships in County Kildare at a stand sponsored by the newspaper. He has made television appearances on Tubridy Tonight, The Late Late Show, Nationwide, Podge and Rodge and The Restaurant.

Neven was Resident Chef on Open House television series from 1998 until 2004. He has also featured in a number of other television programmes including 10 of the Best; Neven Cooks, a 6-part series which is broadcast in South Africa, Australia and on Food Network; Cook with Love, a documentary on his participation in the World Cooking Competition in Lyon in 2002 and Neven's Food from the Sun. Maguire is currently featured on the Public Broadcasting Service (PBS) television network, Create TV where he hosts a cooking show entitled Neven Maguire: Home Chef.

=== Books ===
Neven has published several books:

- Food from the Sun (ISBN 9780007285136) HarperCollins
- Neven's Real Food for Families (ISBN 9780717142613)
- Home Chef (ISBN 9780007300839)
- Neven Maguire's Cookery Collection (ISBN 9781842232569)
- Cooking for Family and Friends (ISBN 9781842232156)
- Neven Cooks (ISBN 9781842231296)

He launched a cookbook for those with Parkinson's disease for the Parkinson's Association of Ireland.

== Magazine cover with Georgia Salpa ==
Maguire and Salpa on the cover of Food & Wine in August 2009

In August 2009, Maguire appeared alongside the bikini-wearing model Georgia Salpa and a plate of food on the cover of Food & Wine magazine. A national radio debate on Liveline saw feminists object to the treatment of Salpa and the magazine's publisher apologised and admitted it had been an error which had occurred whilst she had been absent from work.

One caller suggested the photos were "evidence of a pernicious heteronormativity", whilst another complained that "women are here to please men and we're supposed to have these perfect bodies". Another caller also expressed disappointment: "I really don't see what this [bikini model] has to do with the pic. And I'm really disappointed with the women that they partake in this as well". Callers also expressed fears that the photos would lead to rape and the sexualisation of children.

John Masterson, writing in the Irish Independent, accused Liveline of "manufacturing" the fight, called the radio show a "kangaroo-court" and questioned why football manager Giovanni Trapattoni ("who had one more model than Neven in the same paper") was not equally guilty according to the feminists. However, Catherine O'Mahony, writing in The Sunday Business Post, praised the apology given by the magazine publisher as the whole affair was "pretty embarrassing for everyone connected with it". Model Nadia Forde furthered the controversy by saying "I don't think any chef would make it into a newspaper on his own", causing upset in the Irish cooking community and leading chef Derry Clarke to respond with the remark: "We [chefs] don't need models to make the papers. I have been in plenty of papers without the help of models". Maguire was not paid for his involvement in the photo shoot and five other chefs were also present to be photographed.

== Awards ==
- Hotel & Catering Review Gold Medal Award for Fine Dining (2008)
- Food & Wine's 'Ulster Best Restaurant' Award 2009, 2008, 2004, 2003, 2002
- Food & Wine's 'Restaurant of the Year' Award 2008
- Food & Wine's 'Ulster Best Chef' Award 2009, 2008, 2007, 2004
- Georgina Campbell's Restaurant of the Year Award 2007
- Special Award for Culinary Achievements and Tourism Promotion from Cavan County Council 2007
- Georgina Campbell's Natural Food Award 2006
- Jameson Chef of the Year 2004
- Represented Ireland in the Bocuse d'Or World Cuisine Competition in Lyon, France 2001
- Gold Medal Award Winner 2001
- Bushmills Chef of the Year 1999 and 2000
- Eurotoque Young Chef of the Year 199
- Best Student in the UK and Ireland 1997
