= Blacklion =

Village in County Cavan, Ireland

Blacklion An Blaic / An Leargaidh
- Village
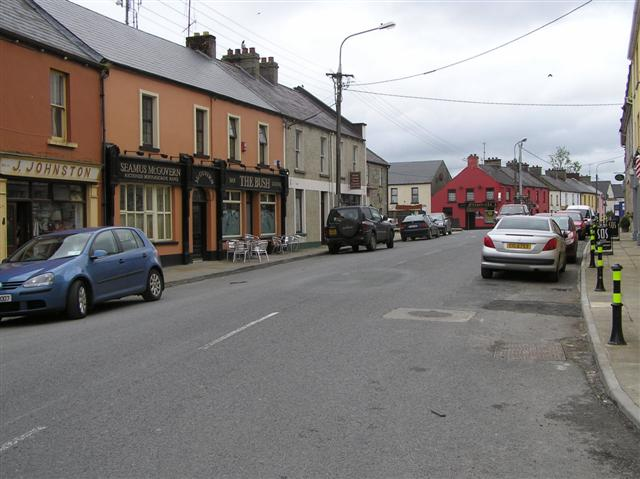
- Main Street, Blacklion, in July 2007

- Location in Ireland
- Coordinates: 54°17′28″N 7°52′33″W
- Country: Ireland
- Province: Ulster
- County: County Cavan
- Barony: Tullyhaw

Population (2022)
  - Total: 175
- Time zone: UTC+0 (WET)
  - Summer (DST): UTC+1 (IST (WEST))

Blacklion (Irish: An Blaic; originally An Leargaidh) is a village in the north-west of County Cavan in Ireland. It is situated on the N16 national primary road, just across the border from Belcoo, a village in the south-west of County Fermanagh.

== History ==
The village is within the townland of Tuam (Irish: Tuaim, meaning 'tumulus'). A stone cairn, a burial cist and two stone cashels are all within the townland, giving evidence of early habitation.

The ruins of the mediaeval Killesher Church lie about 4.2 kilometres (2.6 mi) south-east of Blacklion. The ruins sit on a hillside in the south-west of County Fermanagh, between Blacklion and Cladagh Bridge, very close to the Hanging Rock and overlooking both the Gortatole Outdoor Education Centre and Lower Lough Macnean. The current ruins sit on an Early Christian ecclesiastical site associated with St. Lasser or St. Lasair. The modern Parish of Killesher in both the Diocese of Kilmore and the Diocese of Kilmore, Elphin and Ardagh is named after this ancient site.

The original name of the village was Largay (also Largy, Largain, Largin and Largan, from the Gaelic Leargaidh meaning a hillside), which was part of a túath belonging to the Coffey McGoverns, a sub-sept of the Mac Shamhráin (McGovern or Magauran) clan, from the 9th century until the Plantation of Ulster in the 17th century.

The Annals of the Four Masters under the year 1594 state:

M1594.7: O'Donnell, as we have stated, was encamped, laying siege to Enniskillen, from the middle of June to the month of August, until the warders of the castle had consumed almost all their provisions. Messengers came to O'Donnell from the Scots, whom he had before invited over, to inform him that they had arrived at Derry. And those who had come thither were Donnell Gorm Mac Donnell, and Mac Leod of Ara. O'Donnell then set out with a small number of his forces to hire them; and he left another large party of them with Maguire to assist him, and he ordered them to remain blockading the castle. When the Lord Justice, Sir William Fitzwilliam, had received intelligence that the warders of Enniskillen were in want of stores and provisions, he ordered a great number of the men of Meath [Kingdom of Mide], and of the gentlemen of the Reillys and the Binghams of Connaught, under the conduct of George Oge Bingham, to convey provisions to Enniskillen. These chieftains, having afterwards met together, went to Cavan, O'Reilly's town, for provisions; and they proceeded through Fermanagh, keeping Lough Erne on the right, until they arrived within about four miles of the town. When Maguire (Hugh) received intelligence that these forces were marching towards the town with the aforesaid provisions, he set out with his own forces and the forces left him by O'Donnell, together with Cormac, the son of the Baron, i.e. the brother of the Earl O'Neill; and they halted at a certain narrow pass, to which they thought they the enemy would come to them. The ambuscade was successful, for they came on, without noticing any thing, until they fell in with Maguire's people at the mouth of a certain ford. A fierce and vehement conflict, and a spirited and hard-contested battle, was fought between both parties, till at length Maguire and his forces routed the others by dint of fighting, and a strages of heads was left to him; and the rout was followed up a great way from that place. A countless number of nobles and plebeians [plebs] fell in this conflict. Many steeds, weapons, and other spoils, were left behind in that place by the defeated, besides the steeds and horses that were loaded with provisions, on their way to Enniskillen. A few fugitives of Meath and of the Reillys escaped from this conflict, and never stopped until they arrived in Breifny O'Reilly. The route taken by George Oge Bingham and the few who escaped with him from the field was through the Largan, the territory of the Clann-Coffey Magauran, through Breifny O'Rourke, and from thence to Sligo. The name of the ford at which this great victory was gained was changed to Bel-atha-na-mBriosgadh Battle of the Ford of the Biscuits, from the number of biscuits and small cakes left there to the victors on that day. When the warders of the castle heard of the defeat of the army, they surrendered the castle to Maguire; and he gave them pardon and protection.

King James I then granted it to Nicholas Pynner in the following grant:

Patent 13 James I. XL-8. 14th December. Grant from the king to Nich Pynner, Gent. Cavan Co. In Largy, or Largin Ter. The Precinct of Toom, containing 4 polls, called Gortnesillagh, Mullaghgarrowe, Rossan and Ture or Toore. Total rent £1-12-0 English. To hold for ever, as of the Castle of Dublin, in common socage.

In the Commonwealth Survey of 1652, the lands were owned by Thomas Worship (alias Worsopp) and the tenant was Lan Lawther.

By a deed dated 9 April 1711, the lands of Pinner alias Leirgg alias Largy were granted, inter alia, to Morley Saunders.

== 1625 Rising in Blacklion ==
In 1625, the McGoverns planned an uprising against the English Crown. On 21 August 1625, the Fermanagh Assize Judges wrote from Enniskillen to The 1st Viscount Falkland, Lord Deputy of Ireland, as follows-

"We received news of it on arriving at Enniskillen from the Archbishop of Cashel and Sir William Cole. The Maguires of Fermanagh and Magawrans (McGoverns) of Cavan were the leaders. They proposed to raise arms in anticipation of a Spanish landing, to surprise the castles, and to take back their confiscated lands now in the hands of undertakers. We examined one Phelim bane McCabe and gained from him the names of the ringleaders, both Maguires. We drew bills of indictment against four leaders. We arraigned and tried them by a jury of good freeholders of the English who found them all guilty. We shall sentence them to death; but if your Lordship wishes to mitigate the sentence, they can be sent to Dublin; provided they have a good guard, for the natives are all embarked in the plot. We await Deputy's advice before proceeding further. We do not like to set the witnesses free lest they should receive violence from the friends of the accused. Nor can we imprison them as there is no separate room in the jail, and they would have to be with the accused. We have therefore remitted them to the sheriff's house, only to be restrained from conference with any of the Irish, for which we have undertaken to try and get the sheriff some payment."

On 20 August 1625 Phelim bane McCabe swore:

"that he found Bryan McTerlagh McCoigh McGawran and Cahell McGawran of the Largan, amongst others, in a wood, where they were taking some snuffing tobacco. Afterwards Terlagh Wolly Maguire came and asked him to join a rebellion, saying that the Spaniard was coming and on the sea, and that the King was dead. He met the conspirators again subsequently and they urged him to join them and rob the country. If the Spaniards came the natives would rise and take Portora, Castleton, the Castle of Tully, and Sir John Dunbar's house. The leader was to be Shane a' Warra Maguire, and others of the Largan and Clanawly. And that the names of the conspirators in the land of Cavan were Terlagh Oge Magawran and Gerrod Magawran (alias Ferdinando)."

== The Black Lion Inn ==
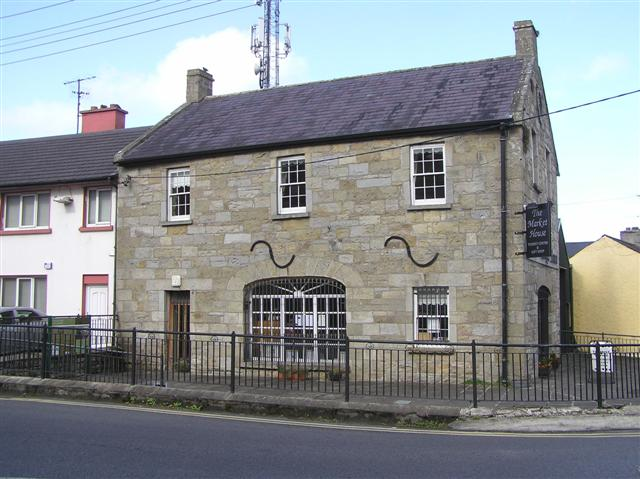
The Market House, one of the oldest buildings in the village, is now home to a tourist information centre.

The name was changed to Blacklion in honour of a famous coaching inn in the village. (Note: Taylor and Skinner's Maps of Ireland 1777 states "Largay or Black Lion Inn". Matthew Sleater's Directory of 1806 states "Largay or Black Lion Inn".) Wilson's Post-Chaise Companion of 1786 states:

Within 2 miles and a half of the Black Lion, on the L. are the ruins of a church; and within a mile of the Black Lion, on the L. is Marle Bank, the seat of Mr. Irwine. On the R. is a large and beautiful lake, called Lough Machnean [sic], with three finely cultivated islands in it. About a quarter of a mile to the R. of Largay, or the Black Lion inn, is Belcoo Bridge, which leads to Garison [Garrison] road.

The aforementioned inn may have been the establishment which gave shelter and hospitality to the founder of Methodism, John Wesley. In the 1770s, during one of his many tours through the Kingdom of Ireland, he recorded how bad weather forced him to stay the night at a local inn, Carrick a Beg, whose proprietor was sympathetic to his message- After riding round, and round, we came in the evening to a lone house called Carrick-a-Beg. It lay in the midst of horrid mountains; and had no very promising appearance. However, it afforded corn for our horses, and potatoes for ourselves. So we made a hearty supper, called in as many as pleased of the family to prayers, and, though we had no fastening either for our door or our windows, slept in peace. The site of The Black Lion Inn was occupied by Dolan's Hotel in the 1920s. Ambrose Leet's 1814 Directory spells the name as Black-lion.

Blacklion's urban growth was hampered until the mid nineteenth century by the nearby village of Red Lion, some miles to the west on the coach-road to Sligo. The weather event known as The Night of the Big Wind in January 1839 caused structural damage to the Protestant church at Thornhill, to the west of Blacklion. This was never fully repaired. According to local tradition Blacklion was the first place in County Cavan to be affected by the potato blight in the autumn of 1845. Deaths as a result of malnutrition and disease in the subsequent Great Famine were high.

In the 1950s the village name plate read Learga. This was the name by which local older generation people would have called the place – colloquially called Leargy. Learga is the plural of an Irish word Learg meaning rising ground, slopes, or mountain side. This description would connect with the topographical location of the village, which sits below steeply rising ground and hills. Today, Learga no longer appears on the village signs, which now show An Blaic. The village is generally referred to by local residents as "The Black".

During The Troubles, Blacklion, as a main border crossing, was home to a joint Irish Army/Garda Síochána checkpoint. It was the scene of a bomb attack in 1974 by the UVF.

== Geography ==
Blacklion is situated between the lakes of Upper and Lower Lough MacNean. The river which connects the two lakes forms the border between County Cavan and County Fermanagh in Northern Ireland. A bridge over this river connects Blacklion to the village of Belcoo in County Fermanagh. Blacklion sits at the foot of the hills below Cuilcagh Mountain, across which the border extends.

Blacklion is on the N16 road that goes from Sligo to Enniskillen and on to Belfast (becomes the A4 road in Northern Ireland). In addition to being on the border of County Fermanagh, Blacklion is also just 5 kilometres (3 mi) from the border of County Leitrim. The point where the three counties of Cavan, Leitrim and Fermanagh join is in the centre of Upper Lough McNean.

== Transport ==
=== Rail transport ===
In 1879 the Sligo, Leitrim and Northern Counties Railway line opened with Belcoo station serving both Belcoo and Blacklion. The last trains ran through the station on 20 September 1957. The railway bridge crossing the river between Blacklion and Belcoo was blown up by the British Army in the late 1970s, ostensibly to prevent its potential use by the Irish Republican Army (IRA) for moving arms across the Irish border.

Today the nearest railway station is in Sligo with trains to Dublin Connolly.

=== Coach/bus transport ===
Blacklion is a stop on the Bus Éireann Sligo-Manorhamilton-Enniskillen Expressway route 66. The coach stops at Sligo bus station which is beside Sligo railway station.

== Local attractions ==
Attractions near Blacklion include the lakes of Upper and Lower Lough MacNean, the Marble Arch Caves, the Cladagh Glen Nature Reserve, Florence Court house and grounds, Glenfarne forest with its lakeside walks, Shannon Pot (the source of the River Shannon, Ireland's longest river) and Cuilcagh Mountain Park. 3 kilometres (2 mi) south of Blacklion lies the Cavan Burren, a limestone landscape containing a number of Neolithic remains, which was planted with forestry in the 1950s and has since been partially reclaimed and signposted to provide access to its structures and geological features. The Cavan Way, a 25 km (16 mi) marked walking trail runs from the village of Dowra, County Cavan to Blacklion. It links up with the Ulster Way at Blacklion and the Leitrim Way and Beara-Breifne Way in Dowra.

Blacklion also has a nine-hole golf course and a restaurant, the MacNean Bistro, run by chef Neven Maguire. Upper Lough Macnean is known as a coarse fishing lake and contains bream, roach, hybrids, pike, perch, eel and brown trout. The Lough MacNean Sculpture Trail circles the lakes.

== Notable people ==
- Séamus Dolan (1914–2010), Fianna Fáil politician, Cathaoirleach (chairman) of Seanad Éireann from 1977 to 1981.
- Neven Maguire (born 1974), chef and television personality, was born in Blacklion and is head chef and proprietor of his family's restaurant in the village.
- Antony Booth (born 1931) lived in Blacklion from 2003 to 2009. Tony, an actor who appeared in films and TV shows such as Coronation Street and Till Death Us Do Part, is sometimes better known as the father-in-law of former British Prime Minister Sir Tony Blair.
- Cathal Buí Mac Giolla Ghunna, ('Yellow Cathal' McElgunn) was a Gaelic poet from Barran townland (three miles from Blacklion) whose life and work is celebrated annually in a festival/summer school started in 1998. Cathal Buí's name is visible on local tourist signposts bearing the legend "Cathal Bui Country" with an image of a dead bird alongside. This symbol derives from the poet's work, An Bonnán Buí ("The Yellow Bittern"), a poem in which he laments the fate of a bird who died from thirst. There is a monument to his memory on the shore of Upper Lough MacNean, 2 kilometres (1 mi) from Blacklion on the Sligo road.

== Sport ==
Blacklion is home to the most westerly and northerly Gaelic Athletic Association club in County Cavan, the Shannon Gaels. The team currently plays in the Division 3 of the all county football league and the Cavan Junior Football Championship. The club covers the geographical area of Blacklion, Glangevlin and the divided village of Dowra. The club's name derives from Shannon Pot, the source of the River Shannon, which is located southwest of the village below Cuilcagh mountain.

== See also ==
- List of towns and villages in Ireland
- Market Houses in Ireland
- Tomas Óg Mág Samhradháin
