= Leitrim Way =

Long-distance trail in Ireland

The Leitrim Way
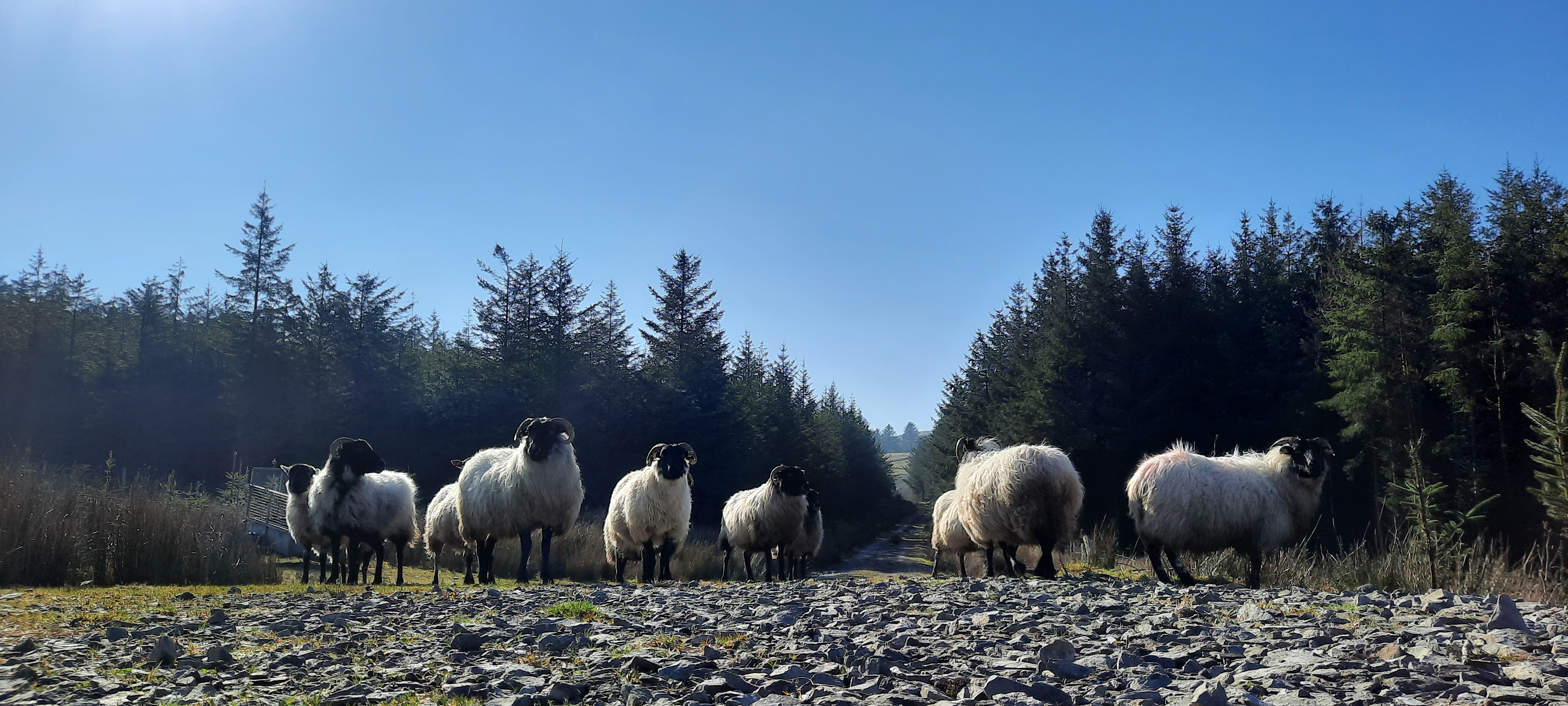
- Sheep on trail
- Length: 57 km (35 mi)
- Location: County Leitrim, Ireland
- Trailheads: Leitrim Village, Manorhamilton, Dowra
- Highest point: 372 m (1,220 ft)
- Difficulty: Strenuous
- Season: All year
- Waymark: Yellow walker figure on black background

The Leitrim Way is a 57km long-distance trail between Leitrim village, and Manorhamilton, County Leitrim, Ireland. This route is generally completed over 2–3 days, and brings walkers through a variety of landscape forms common to this part of the northwest of Ireland. The Leitrim Way forms part of Ireland's National Waymarked Ways.

The strenuous route brings walkers through a series of mountain passes, forest roads, riverside paths, small farmlands and quiet boreens, passing closely to rural villages such as Glenfarne, Ballinagleragh and Coollegraine. Visitors can find historic heritage sites unique to the area, such as sweathouses which are dotted throughout the countryside.

The Leitrim Way has become popular with long distance trail runners, with the current "Fastest Known Time" of completion to be 5hours 11mins by local runner Ricki Wynne.

The route meets other long distance trails, such as the Cavan Way at Dowra or the Miners Way and Historical Trail near Leitrim Village. Walkers can combine sections of The Leitrim Way to form longer guided walks, such as The Ireland Way, the Beara-Breifne Way, or the E2 European Ramblers Association epath .

The route was closed/partly closed for a number of years throughout 2007-2018; however it is presently fully open and undergoing improvement works along the 57km route. This includes reroutes to improve safety and the walker's experience. These upgrade works are overseen by The Leitrim Way Management Committee, who work to improve the condition of the trail and promote the route. The Management Committee is composed of volunteer reps from the communities along the trail, and members of Coillte, Leitrim County Council, Leitrim Development Company, Mountain Meitheal and Waterways Ireland.
