= Miners Way and Historical Trail =

Miners' Way and Historical Trail
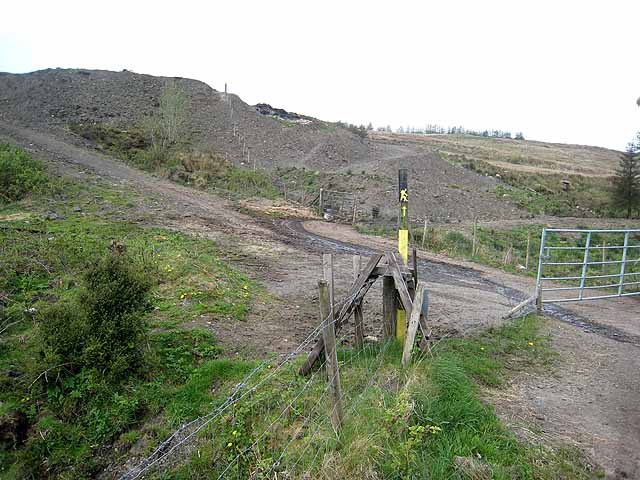
- Mining spoil heaps by trail at Arigna
- Length: 118 km (73 mi)
- Location: Counties Leitrim, Roscommon & Sligo, Ireland
- Designation: National Waymarked Trail
- Trailheads: Arigna
- Use: Hiking
- Elevation gain/loss: 2,340 m (7,677 ft)
- Difficulty: Stenuous
- Season: Any

The Miners' Way and Historical Trail is a long-distance trail in Ireland. It is a 118-kilometre (73-mile) long circular route that begins and ends in Arigna, County Roscommon. It is typically completed in five days. It is designated as a National Waymarked Trail by the National Trails Office of the Irish Sports Council and is managed by Roscommon Integrated Development Company, Roscommon County Council, Leitrim County Council and Sligo County Council. The trail was developed to encourage tourism in the area in the wake of the closure of the Arigna mines in 1990. The route was originally conceived by a local priest, Father Sean Tynan, and built with funding from the European Regional Development Fund. The trail was opened by broadcaster Donncha Ó Dúlaing in July 2000.

The trail consists of three looped routes that travel through neighbouring parts of Counties Roscommon, Leitrim and Sligo. The Miners' Way is 62 kilometres (39 miles) long and follows paths used by miners working in the Arigna coal mines and makes a circuit via Keadue, Ballyfarnon and Corrie Mountain. The Historical Trail is 56 kilometres (35 miles) long and makes a circuit of Lough Key and Lough Arrow via Keadue, Lough Key Forest Park, Boyle, Carrowkeel, Castlebaldwin, Highwood and Ballyfarnon. A third trail makes a circuit of Lough Allen via Drumkeeran, Dowra and Drumshanbo.

Parts of the Miners' Way and Historical Trail also form part of the Beara-Breifne Way, a walking and cycling route under development, intended to run from the Beara Peninsula, County Cork to Breifne, County Leitrim following the line of Donal Cam O'Sullivan Beare's march in the aftermath of the Battle of Kinsale in 1602.
