= Beara-Breifne Way =

Long-distance walking trail in Ireland

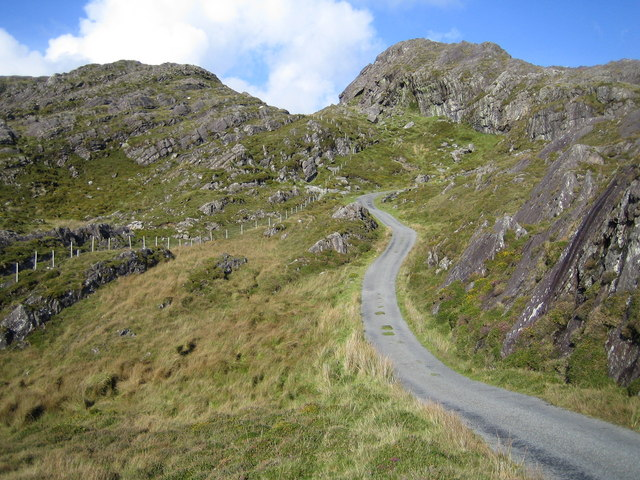
- Beara Way, part of the Beara-Breifne Way
- Length: c. 700 km start - finish 1000km including loops
- Location: Counties Kerry, Cork, Limerick, Tipperary, Offaly, Galway, Roscommon, Sligo, Leitrim & Cavan, Ireland
- Trailheads: Beara Peninsula and Blacklion
- Use: Walking and cycling
- Season: Any
- Website: bearabreifneway.ie

The Beara-Breifne Way (BBW) is a long-distance walking and cycling trail being developed from the Beara Peninsula in County Cork, Ireland, to Blacklion in the area of Breifne in County Cavan. The trail follows closely the line of the historical march of O’Sullivan Beare.

== Route ==
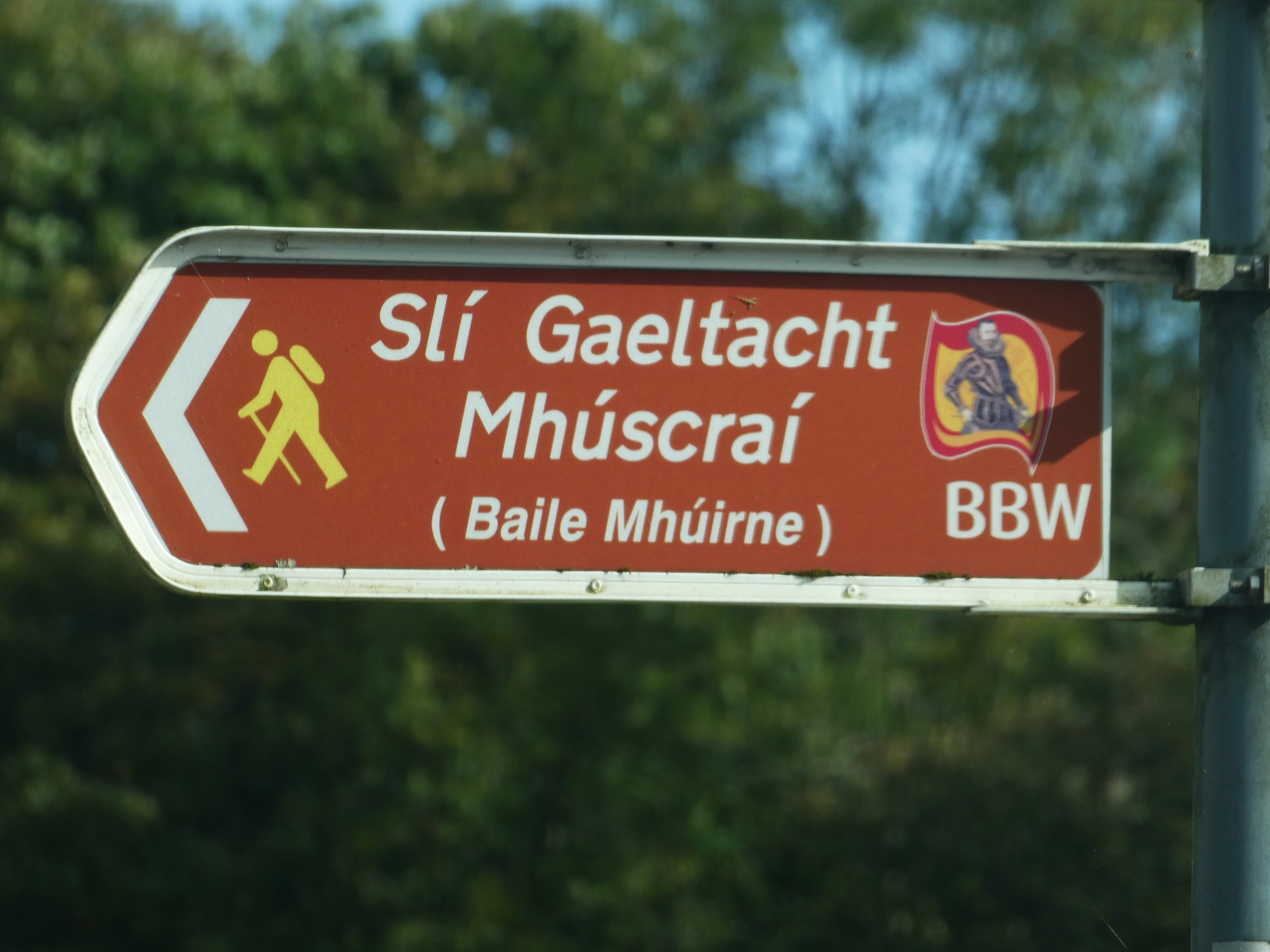
A BBW sign, towards Ballyvourney

The completed route will interconnect existing walking routes: The Beara Way, the Slí Gaeltacht Mhuscraí, the North Cork Way, the Ballyhoura Way, the Multeen Way, the Ormond Way, the Hymany Way, the Suck Valley Way, the Lung Lough Gara Way, the Miners Way and Historical Trail, the Leitrim Way and the Cavan Way. At Blacklion the walk continues as the Ulster Way.
