= Suck Valley Way =

Walking trail in Ireland

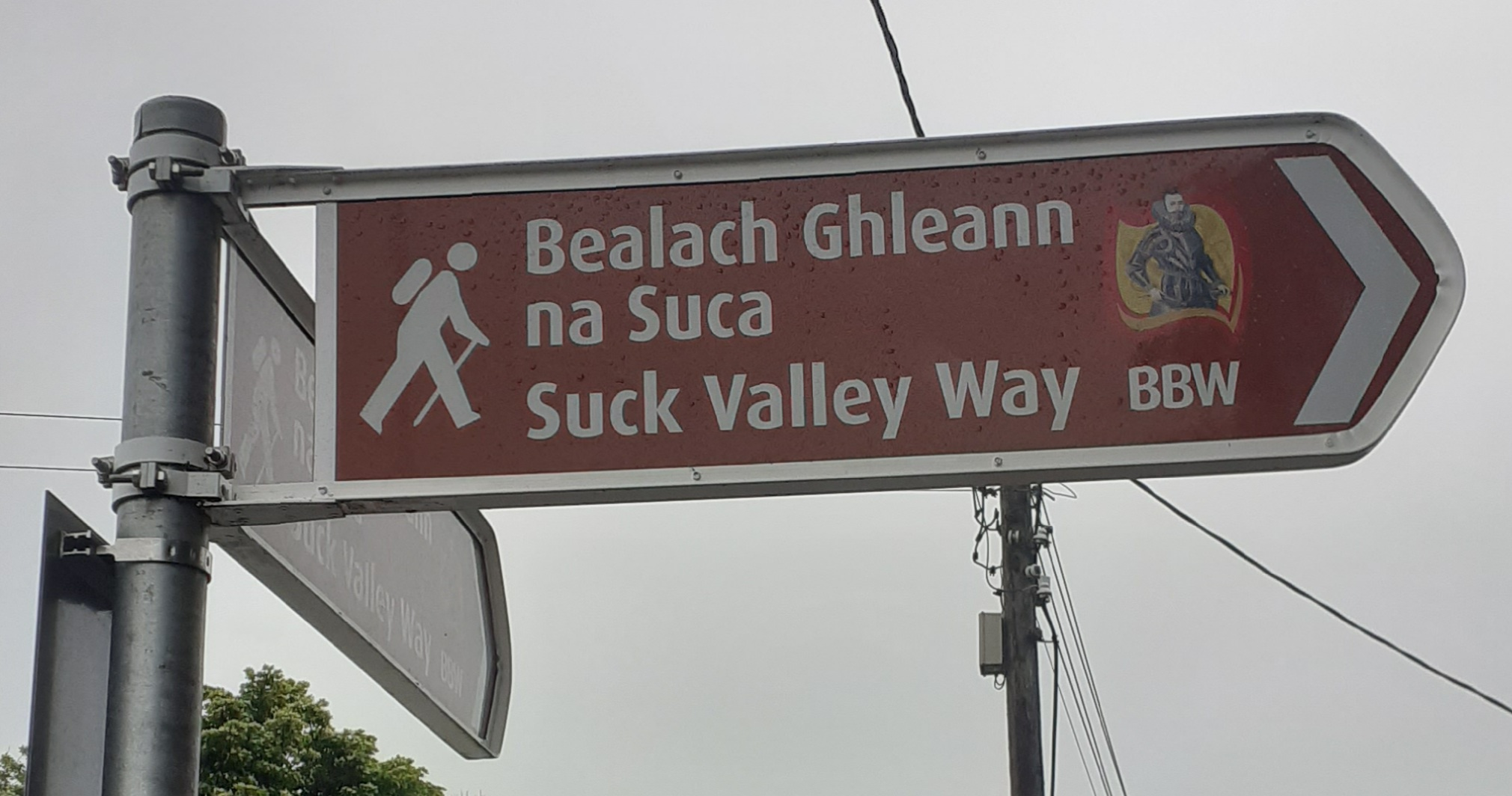
- Suck Valley Way Sign (with the symbol for the Beara-Breifne Way)
- Length: 105 kilometres (65 miles)
- Location: Counties Roscommon & Galway, Ireland
- Designation: National Waymarked Trail
- Trailheads: Castlerea
- Use: Hiking
- Elevation gain/loss: 580 m (1,903 ft)
- Difficulty: Moderate
- Season: Any
- Website: https://www.discoversuckvalleyway.ie/

The Suck Valley Way is a long-distance trail in Ireland. It is a 105-kilometre (65-mile) long circular route that begins and ends in Castlerea, County Roscommon. It is typically completed in five days. It is designated as a National Waymarked Trail by the National Trails Office of the Irish Sports Council and is managed by Roscommon County Council, Roscommon Integrated Development Company and the Suck Valley Committee.

The Way was devised by the River Suck Valley Development Cooperative, which was formed in 1991 to develop tourism in the region. It took three years to develop, at a cost of IEP £80,000, £46,000 of which was grant-aided by Bord Fáilte. It was officially opened in May 1997 by Enda Kenny, who was at that time Minister for Tourism and Trade.

The trail circles the countryside around the valley of the River Suck south of Castlerea, which straddles the border between Counties Roscommon and Galway, taking in the "Nine Friendly Villages" of Ballintober, Dunamon, Castlecoote, Athleague, Mount Talbot, Ballygar, Creggs, Glinsk and Ballymoe.

The section of the Suck Valley Way from Ballygar to Ballymoe forms part of the Beara-Breifne Way, a walking and cycling route under development, intended to run from the Beara Peninsula, County Cork to Breifne, County Leitrim, following the line of Donal Cam O'Sullivan Beare's march in the aftermath of the Battle of Kinsale in 1603.
