= Ulster Way =

Series of walking routes in Northern Ireland

Coordinates: 55.250°N 6.485°W

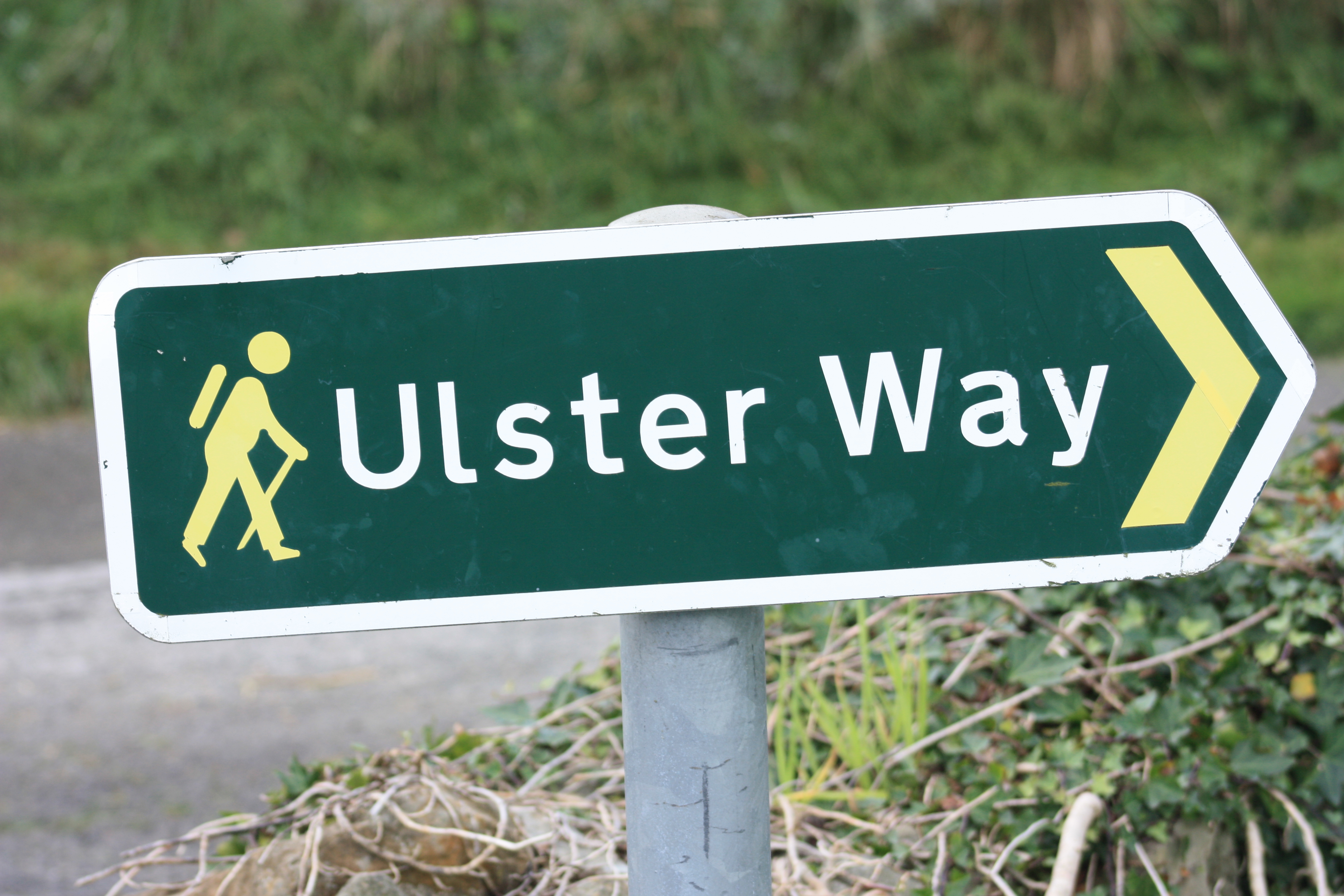
- Ulster Way sign near Strangford, August 2009.
- Length: 636 miles (1,024 kilometres)
- Location: Northern Ireland; Republic of Ireland
- Trailheads: Belfast
- Use: Hiking
- Season: Any
- Sights: Mourne Mountains, Fermanagh lakeland, Sperrin Mountains, Giant's Causeway
- Surface: Mountain, field and cliff paths; roads.
- Website: www.walkni.com/ulster-way/

The Ulster Way is a series of walking routes which encircles Northern Ireland. It was founded in the 1970s by Wilfrid Merydith Capper, who was inspired by Tom Stephenson's Pennine Way. The route was relaunched in 2009 by the Department of the Environment (Northern Ireland).

The vast majority of the trail lies within Northern Ireland, with small sections being in the Republic of Ireland. The path visits many places of interest including the Mourne Mountains, Giant's Causeway, Cavehill and the Sperrins. Most of the sections are clearly sign-posted.

== History ==
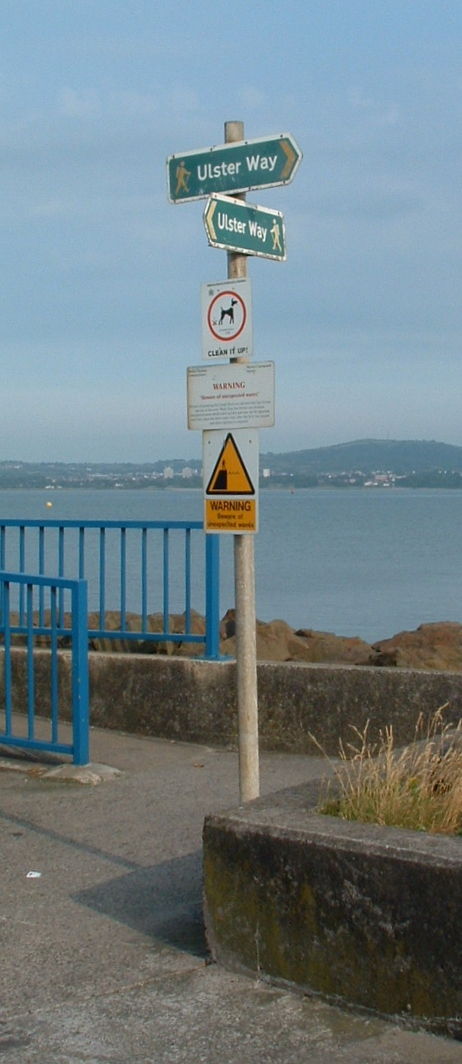
Signing on the shore of Belfast Lough in Holywood.

Wilfrid Capper developed the idea for the Ulster Way in 1946, as a waymarked trail that would pass through the six counties of Northern Ireland, linking 15 youth hostels which were in place at the time. Once implemented, this original route stretched for 665 miles.

Towards the end of the 20th century, large sections of the trail fell into disrepair or were "lost" due to increased car traffic on some of the road sections, and ambiguity of ownership and land access rights.

In April 2003, Environment Minister Angela Smith MP announced a project to improve and maintain the Ulster Way. A new route was agreed in early 2009. The new route was officially opened on 16 September 2009. This revised route is 625 miles; the first people to hike the entire revised route are thought to be schoolboys Matthew Hoper and Simon Harris, who completed it between 28 June and 4 August 2010.
