= Donal Cam O'Sullivan Beare =

Irish nobleman and soldier (1560–1618)

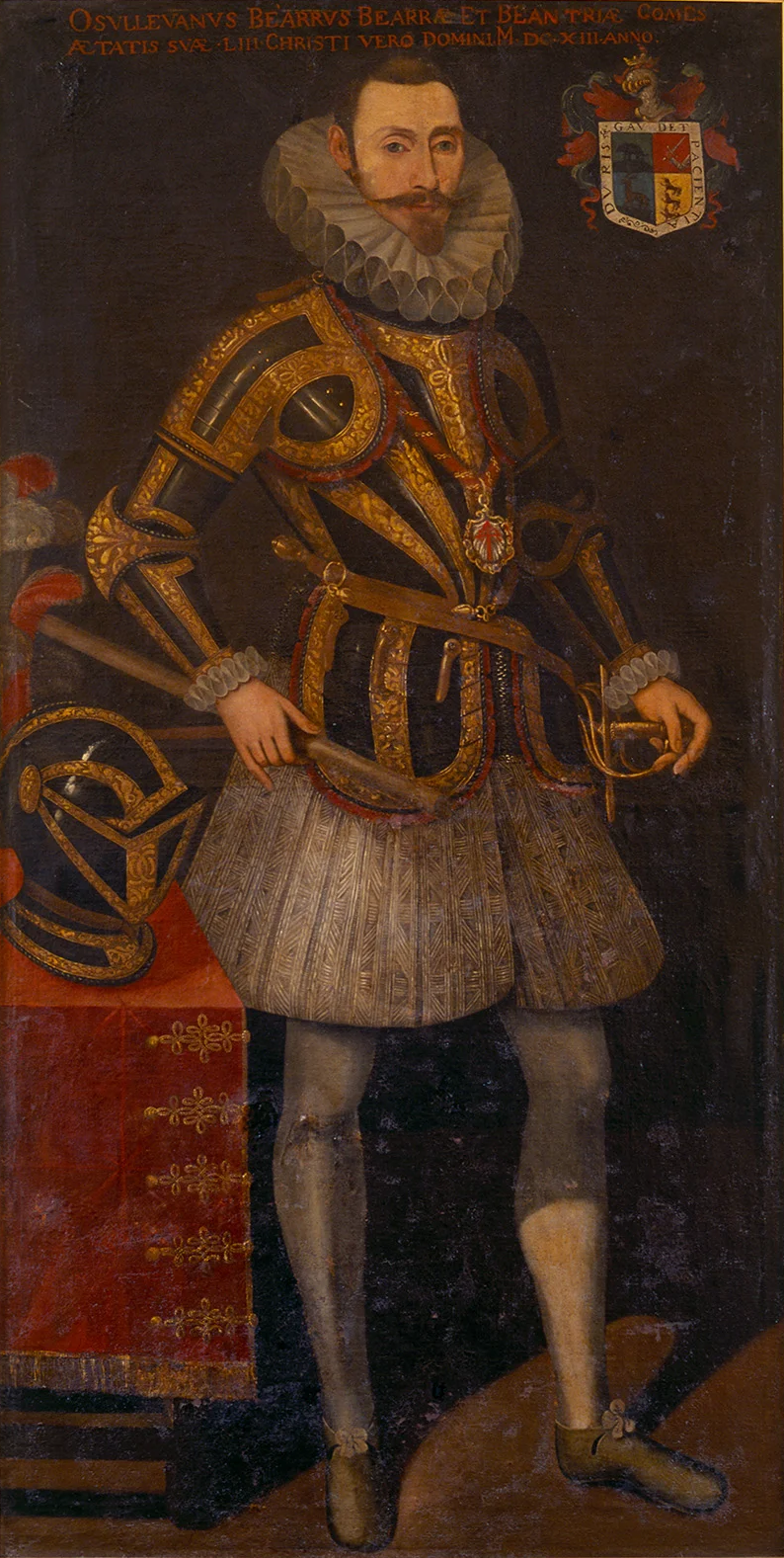
- Portrait of O'Sullivan Beare, dated 1613 but possibly painted after his death

Chief of the Name O'Sullivan Beare
- Reign: 1594 – 16 July 1618
- Predecessor: Owen O'Sullivan Beare

Count of Berehaven
- Predecessor: Title created
- Successor: Title dormant
- Born: 1561; Ireland
- Died: 6 July 1618 (aged 56); Madrid, Crown of Castile
- Spouse: Elena O'Sullivan Mór

Donal Cam O'Sullivan Beare, Count of Berehaven (Irish: Domhnall Cam Ó Súileabháin Bhéara; 1560 – 6 July [N.S. 16 July] 1618) (Note: Unless otherwise stated, all dates before 1752 are given in the Julian calendar.) was an Irish nobleman and soldier. He was the last Gaelic chief of the O'Sullivan clan prior to the completion of the Tudor conquest of Ireland.

O'Sullivan Beare immigrated to Spain after the Irish confederacy's defeat in the Nine Years' War, and was granted the titled Count of Berehaven in the Spanish nobility. In 1618, he was fatally stabbed by Anglo-Irish merchant John Bath during a quarrel in Madrid.

== Early life ==
Donal Cam O'Sullivan Beare was born in 1560. His father was Donal Cam O'Sullivan Beare, chief of the O'Sullivan Beare in County Kerry and lord of Beare and Bantry. His mother was Margaret O'Brien, daughter of O'Brien of Thomond.

His father was murdered by the MacGillacuddys in 1563, and his father's younger brother Owen succeeded as lord of Beare and Bantry. Owen was confirmed by Dublin Castle administration with the title Lord of Beare and Bantry. In order to consolidate his position, Owen accepted the authority of Queen Elizabeth I and was knighted, thus becoming Sir Owen. In 1587, Donal asserted his own claim to leadership of the clan, petitioning the Dublin Castle administration to put aside Sir Owen's appointment with a claim derived from English laws based on absolute male primogeniture. These laws did not recognise age as relevant to inheritance rights. Keen to extend English legal authority over Ireland, the Dublin Castle administration accepted Donal's claim. He subsequently became The O'Sullivan Beare, head of the clan.

== Nine Years' War ==
By 1600, the province of Munster had been devastated by battle, and Irish Catholics had lost over half a million acres (4,000 km^{2}) of land to Protestant settlers following the defeat of the Desmond Rebellions.

In the lead up to the Nine Years' War O'Sullivan kept his distance from the rebel cause, but in time he joined a confederation of Gaelic chiefs led by Hugh O'Neill, Earl of Tyrone, Ó Néill, and Red Hugh O'Donnell, Ó Domhnaill, of Ulster. Conflict had broken out in 1594, and Tyrone secured support from Philip II of Spain. The Spanish sent an Armada under the command of Don Juan D'Aquilla in 1601. O'Sullivan wrote to the Spanish king in submission to his authority, but the letter was intercepted by the English. In early 1602 the allied Irish and Spanish forces met an English force at the Battle of Kinsale and were defeated.

O'Sullivan resolved to continue the struggle by taking control of the castle of Dunboy. In June 1602 English forces attacked Dunboy and the castle fell after a brief siege. The entire company of defenders was killed in combat or hanged afterwards.

== O'Sullivan's march ==
Donal himself was absent from the siege of Dunboy, having travelled to Ulster for a conference with Tyrone. His letter to Philip II left him with little hope of a pardon from the English, and he continued the fight with guerilla tactics. He also maintained a stronghold on Dursey Island which was attacked by an English detachment under the command of George Carew. According to Philip O'Sullivan Beare, Carew's men killed all 300 occupants of the stronghold, including women and children who had taken shelter there, in what became known as the Dursey Island massacre. After the fall of Dursey and Dunboy, O'Sullivan Beare, Lord of Beara and Bantry, gathered his remaining followers and set off northwards on a 500-kilometre march with 1,000 of his remaining people, starting on 31 December 1602. He hoped to meet Lord Tyrone on the shores of Lough Neagh.

He fought a long rearguard action northwards through Ireland, through Munster, Connacht and Ulster, during which the much larger English force and their Irish allies fought him all the way. The march was marked by the suffering of the fleeing and starving O'Sullivans as they sought food from an already decimated Irish countryside in winter. They faced equally desperate people in this, often resulting in hostility, such as from the Mac Egans at Redwood Castle in Tipperary and at Donohill in O'Dwyer's country, where they raided the food store of The 10th Earl of Ormond. O'Sullivan marched through Aughrim, where he raided villages for food and met local resistance.

He was barred entrance to Glinsk Castle and led his refugees further north. On their arrival at Brian Oge O'Rourke's castle in West Breifne on 14 January 1603, after a fortnight's hard marching and fighting, only 35 of the original 1,000 remained. Many had died in battles or from exposure and hunger, and others had taken shelter or fled along the route. O'Sullivan Beare had marched over 500 kilometres, crossed the River Shannon in the dark of a midwinter night (having taken just two days to make a boat of skin and hazel rods to carry 28 at a time the half-kilometre across the river), fought battles and constant skirmishes, and lost almost all of his people during the hardships of the journey.

In County Leitrim, O'Sullivan Beare sought to join with other northern chiefs to launch a campaign against the English Crown, and organised a force to this end, but resistance ended when Tyrone signed the Treaty of Mellifont. O'Sullivan, like other members of the Gaelic nobility of Ireland who fled, sought exile, making his escape to Spain by ship. The Beara-Breifne Way long-distance walking trail follows closely the line of the historical march.

== Immigration ==
When he left Ireland, Cornelius O'Driscoll and other Irish knights helped him and his clan. In Spain, O'Sullivan Beare was welcomed by Philip III. His princely status was reconfirmed, and he received a commission as an imperial general. His nephew, Philip O'Sullivan Beare, was important in this regard and his 1618 disquisition in Latin, A Briefe Relation of Ireland and the diversity of Irish in the same, was influential.

O'Sullivan Beare attended the 1616 funeral of Hugh O'Neill, Earl of Tyrone.

== Personal life ==
O'Sullivan Beare married Elena, daughter of O'Sullivan Mór. The couple had two sons.

== Death ==
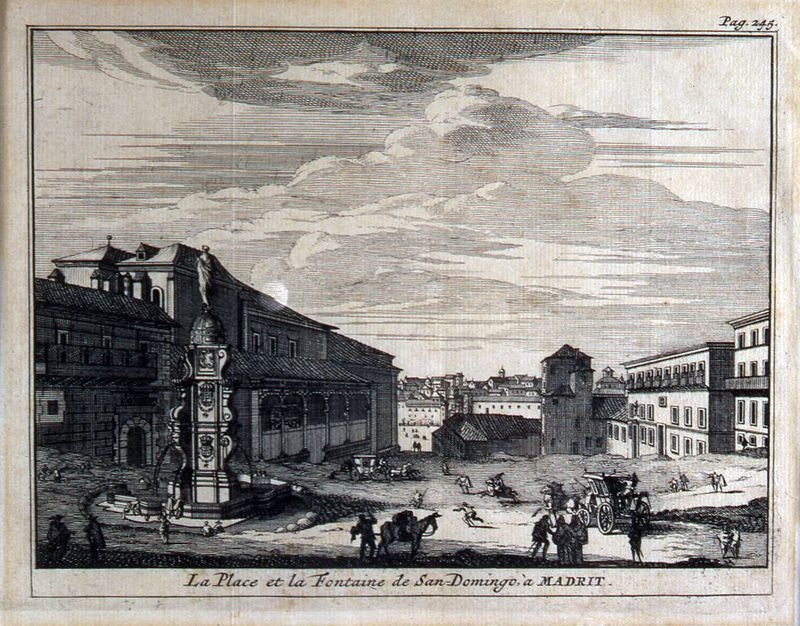
1707 illustration of the Plaza de Santo Domingo in Madrid, where O'Sullivan Beare died

On 6 July [N.S. 16 July] 1618, O'Sullivan Beare was leaving Mass in the Plaza de Santo Domingo, Madrid, when he came upon a street duel between his nephew Philip O'Sullivan Beare and Anglo-Irish merchant John Bath. (Note: John Bath's brother was William Bath, a Jesuit who was head of the Irish College at Salamanca.) In the subsequent moments, Bath stabbed O'Sullivan Beare fatally in the throat. He was 56 years old. Bath took refuge in the church. Irish bystanders ran after King Philip III's passing coach shouting "Justicia! Justicia!" The coach stopped, and the king gave orders to have Bath hauled from the church. Bath was imprisoned.

Accounts of why Philip and Bath were duelling, as well as Donal O'Sullivan Beare's involvement in their conflict, differ. Philip later wrote that he had challenged Bath to the duel over insulting comments made about the O'Sullivan Beare family. According to Philip's account, he was about to kill Bath when Donal O'Sullivan Beare intervened to save Bath's life; ironically Bath took the opportunity to stab him. Bath, writing from prison, claimed that he was ambushed and mugged by Philip and his friends from Cork, and had no intention of fighting a duel since he was outarmed. He was already wounded in the duel when he struck out at O'Sullivan Beare.

According to historian Hiram Morgan, O'Sullivan Beare was in possession of a substantial pension from the Spanish crown, and it was likely he had lent money to Bath. Bath felt he was being demeaned, and Philip felt Bath was abusing O'Sullivan Beare's favour. The historian Terry Clavin states the duel was apparently over money. This duel came at a time of political and religious tension in Ireland. Religiously fervent Gaelic people such as the O'Sullivan Beare family, who were previously considered barbarians to Anglo-Irish Dubliners like Bath, were feted in Spain due to their Catholic faith. The Bath-Philip argument may have been compounded by the fact that Gaelic Irish people living in Madrid believed that John Bath had become an informer on a recent visit to Dublin. The Gaelic wanted the Spanish government to force him from Madrid. The informer allegations seem to be corroborated by the response of the British embassy in Spain, which was quickly working to get Bath out of jail and return him to his church sanctuary, "whence he will easily make an escape", per a letter written by the ambassador. The ambassador insisted that the killing occurred "upon a private quarrel".

The writer Regina Whelan Richardson stated it is possible Bath killed O'Sullivan Beare to prevent him from returning to Ireland and leading an anti-English rebellion.

== Legacy ==
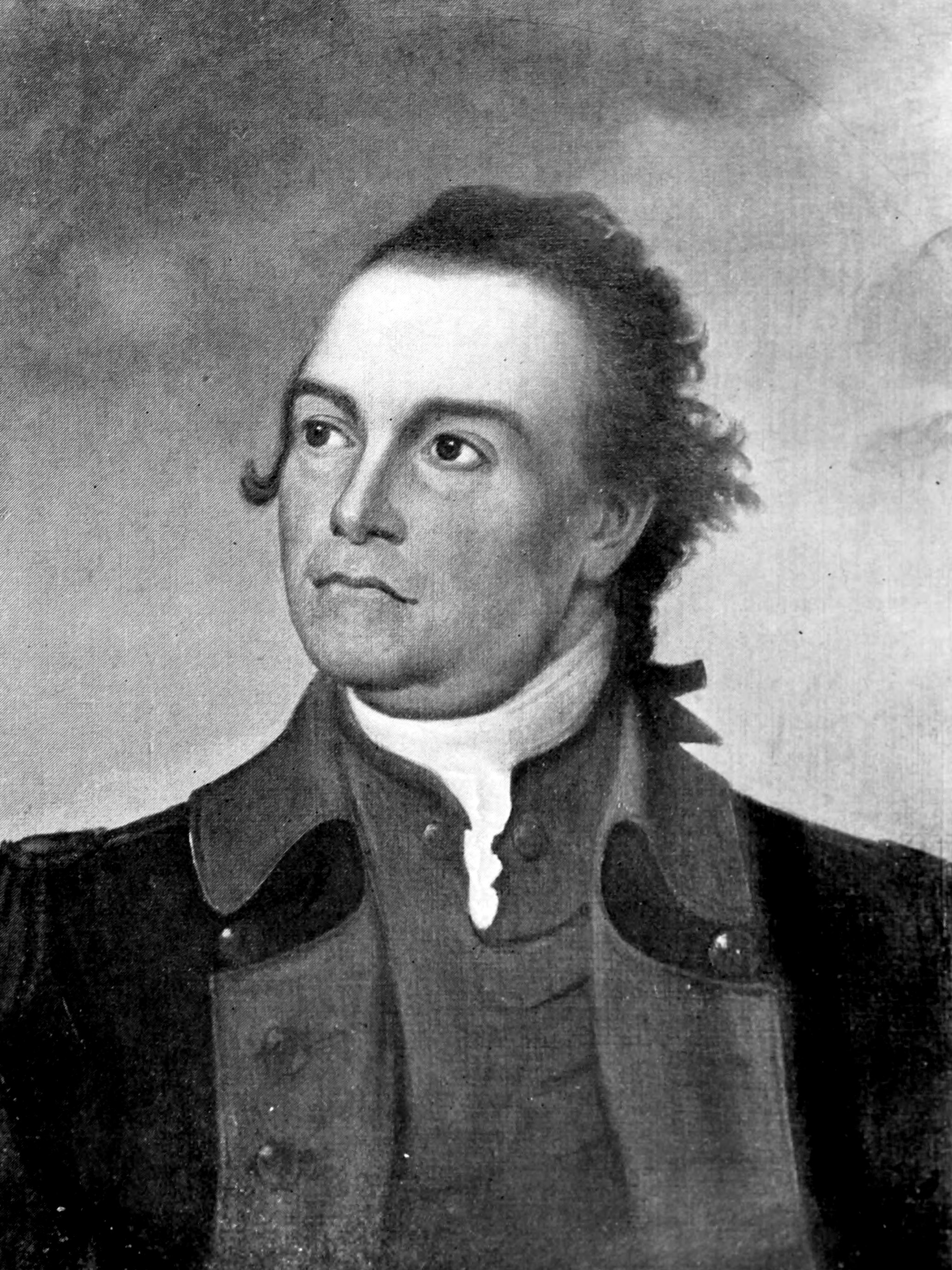
General John Sullivan of New Hampshire

The O'Sullivan Beare had a reputation as "one of the most celebrated Irish soldiers", which helped to open doors for later soldiers from his line. About 165 years later, John Sullivan, regarded as a descendant of O'Sullivan Beare, served as a general in the American Revolution.

O'Sullivan Beare's will is kept in the Archive at Maynooth.

== Portrait ==
A 17th century portrait of O'Sullivan Beare hangs at St Patrick's College, Maynooth. It previously hung at the Irish College at Salamanca, and was restored in 1999. According to the Journal of the Armagh Diocesan Historical Society, the portrait was painted at Salamanca in 1613. Hiram Morgan doubts that O'Sullivan Beare was the model for the portrait. The portrait is dated 1613, but O'Sullivan Beare was not made a Knight of the Order of Santiago until 1617. It is possible the portrait was painted posthumously, on commission from the Irish College at Salamanca.

== In popular culture ==
Donal Cam O'Sullivan Beare is mentioned in the early 20th-century Aisling poetry of Seán Gaelach Ó Súilleabháin (1882–1957). Other works, relating to O'Sullivan Beare, include:

- The Last Prince of Ireland by Morgan Llywelyn
- March into Oblivion by Michael J. Carroll
- O'Sullivan's Odyssey by Rick Spier

== Bibliography ==
- Clavin, Terry (23 September 2004). "O'Sullivan Beare, Donnell Cam, count of Bearehaven in the Spanish nobility". Oxford Dictionary of National Biography (online ed.). Oxford University Press. doi:10.1093/ref:odnb/20910. (Subscription, Wikipedia Library access or UK public library membership required.)
- Ekin, Des (2015). The Last Armada: Queen Elizabeth, Juan del Aguila, and Hugh O'Neill: The Story of the 100-Day Spanish Invasion. Pegasus Books. ISBN 978-1-60598-944-0.
- Kerney Walsh, Micheline (1996). An exile of Ireland, Hugh O'Neill, Prince of Ulster. Dublin: Four Courts Press. ISBN 978-1-85182-234-8.
- O'Byrne, Emmett (October 2009). "O'Sullivan Beare, Domhnall". Dictionary of Irish Biography. doi:10.3318/dib.007078.v1.
- O'Neill, James (2017). The Nine Years War, 1593-1603: O'Neill, Mountjoy and the Military Revolution. Dublin: Four Courts Press. ISBN 978-1-84682-754-9.
- Richardson, Regina Whelan (1995). "The Salamanca Archives". In Neligan, Agnes (ed.). Maynooth Library Treasures (PDF). Royal Irish Academy. pp. 112–147. ISBN 1 874045 24 0. Archived from the original (PDF) on 26 February 2025.
