= List of long-distance trails in the Republic of Ireland =

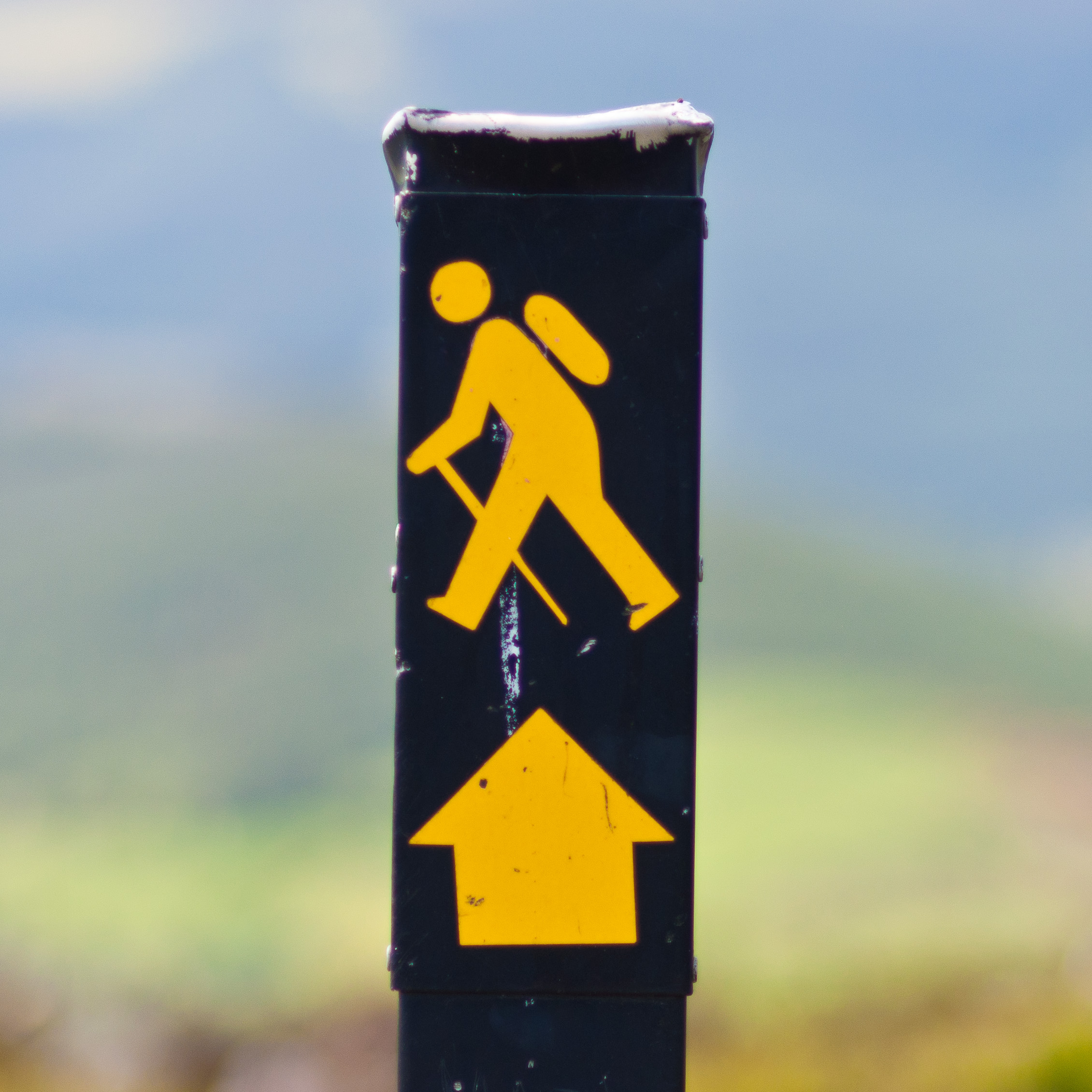
The traditional "walking man" waymarker used to designate National Waymarked Trails in Ireland

These are lists of long-distance trails in the Republic of Ireland, and include recognised and maintained walking trails, pilgrim trails, cycling greenways, boardwalk-mountain trails, and interconnected national and international trail systems.

There are 43 National Waymarked Trails by the 'National Trails Office' of the Irish Sports Council. Each trail is waymarked with square black posts containing an image, in yellow, of a walking man and a directional arrow, a symbol reserved for use only by National Waymarked Trails. The oldest trail in the Republic of Ireland is the Wicklow Way, which was opened in 1980, and there are now over 4,000 kilometres (2,500 miles) of waymarked trails in the Republic alone. The most frequented trails are the Wicklow, Sheep's Head, Kerry, Dingle, Beara, Burren and Western Ways.

In 1997, the Heritage Council, started developing a series of walking routes based on medieval pilgrimage paths, and there are now 124 kilometres (77 miles) of major penitential trails: Cnoc na dTobar, Cosán na Naomh, St. Finbarr's Pilgrim Path, Saint Kevin's Way, and Tochar Phádraig. These pilgrim trails, and seven others, are supported by Pilgrim Paths of Ireland who follow the same guidelines for developing National Waymarked Trails.

In 2017, the 46-kilometre Waterford Greenway was opened for cyclists, and many others are planned or in development. Many of the National Waymarked Trails form part of larger long-distance and transnational trails such as European walking route E8, the Beara-Breifne Way and the International Appalachian Trail.

== National waymarked trails ==
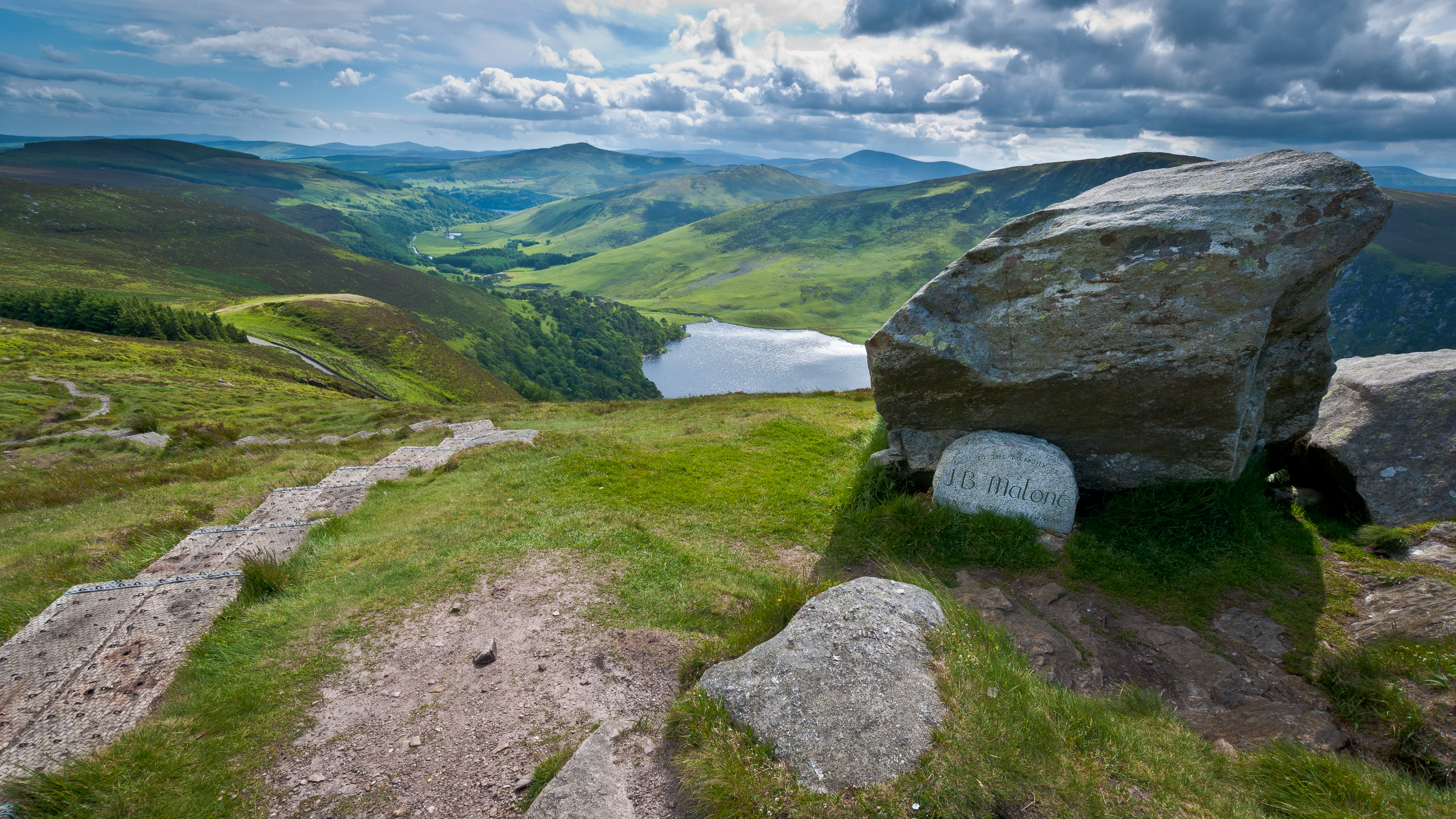
JB Malone Memorial, Wicklow Way

The establishment of the Ulster Way in Northern Ireland in the 1970s prompted the creation of the Cospóir Long Distance Walking Routes Committee (now the 'National Trails Advisory Committee' of the Irish Sports Council) to establish a national network of long-distance trails in the Republic of Ireland. The committee included An Taisce nominee J. B. Malone, who had done much to popularise walking through an Evening Herald newspaper column, television programmes and books. The first trail in the Republic – the Wicklow Way – was based on a series of articles Malone had written for the Evening Herald in 1966, and was opened in 1980; it was followed by the South Leinster and East Munster Ways in 1984; the Kerry Way and the Táin Way in 1985; and the Dingle and Slieve Bloom Ways in 1987.

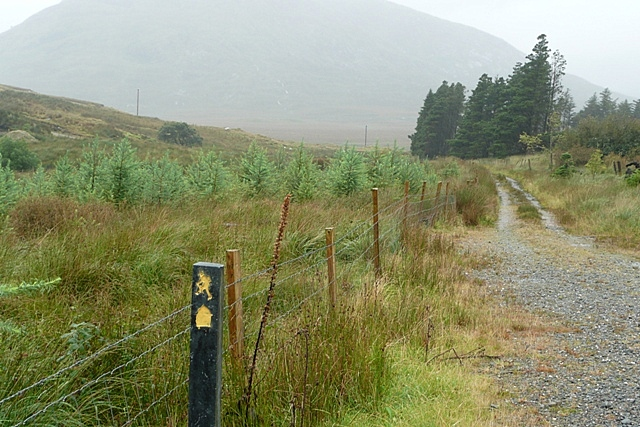
Western Way, Connemara

The work of the committee was not supported by compulsory powers, and access had to be achieved by agreement with local authorities and private landowners, which was not usually forthcoming. Most of the trails are therefore dependent on access from by the state: Coillte, the state-owned forestry company, is the largest single manager of any of the trails with more than 30 National Waymarked Trails making use of its property. Coillte provides and maintains 52% of all off-road walking trails and 24% of the total amount of developed walking trails in Ireland. Access issues mean that many trails have substantial sections on public roads. Author John G. O'Dwyer summed up the situation of trails using long stretches on boring public roads interspersed with monotone Coillte Sitka spruce forests.

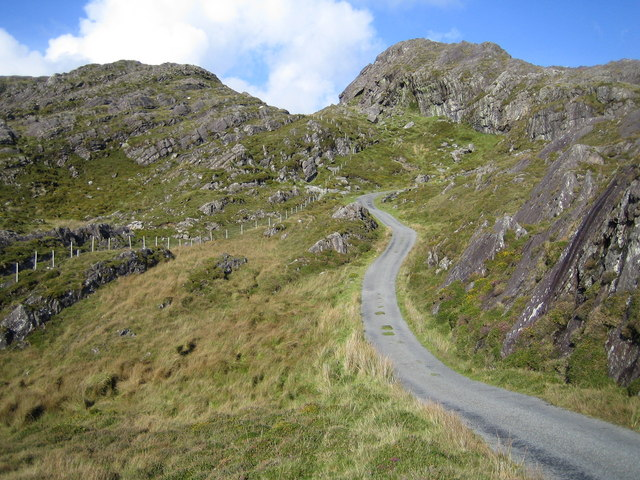
Beara Way, County Kerry

A 2006 National Trails Strategy, by the Irish Sports Council, noted that Irish trails fell well behind international standards, and that access was "the single most important" issue. A 2010 review of the National Waymarked Trails by the Irish Sports Council restated many of these issues and made recommendations on a new standard of trail called a 'National Long Distance Trail' (NLDT), intended to meet international standards for outstanding trails. Five trails – the Beara, Dingle, Kerry, Sheep's Head and Wicklow Ways – were recommended to be upgraded to NLDT.

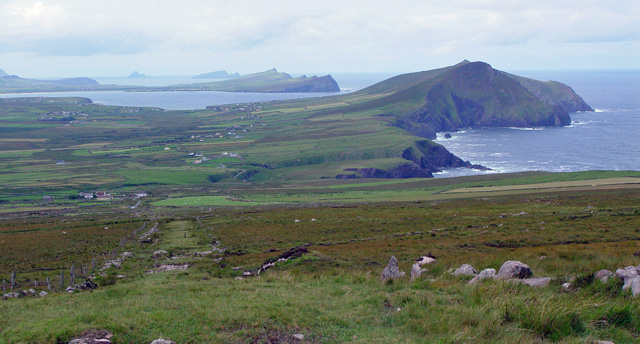
Dingle Way, County Kerry

Name	County	Format	Start	End	Length
Ballyhoura Way (Note: Part of the Beara Breifne Way)	Cork; Limerick; Tipperary	Linear	St John's Bridge	Limerick Junction	89 km (55 mi)
Barrow Way	Carlow; Kildare; Laois	Linear	Robertstown	St Mullin's	100 km (62 mi)
Bealach na Gaeltachta – Slí an Earagail	Donegal	Circular	Dunlewey	Dunlewey	77 km (48 mi)
Bealach na Gaeltachta – Slí Cholmcille (Note: Proposed to form part of the International Appalachian Trail)	Donegal	Circular	Ardara	Ardara	65 km (40 mi)
Bealach na Gaeltachta – Slí Chonamara	Galway	Closed			
Bealach na Gaeltachta – Slí na Finne	Donegal	Circular	Fintown	Fintown	51 km (32 mi)
Bealach na Gaeltachta – Slí na Rosann	Donegal	Circular	Dungloe	Dungloe	65 km (40 mi)
Beara Way (Note: Part of European walking route E8)	Cork; Kerry	Circular	Glengarriff	Glengarriff	206 km (128 mi)
Blackwater Way (Avondhu)	Cork; Tipperary	Linear	Clogheen	Bweeng	94 km (58 mi)
Blackwater Way (Duhallow)	Cork; Kerry	Linear	Bweeng	Shrone	67 km (42 mi)
Bluestack Way	Donegal	Linear	Donegal	Ardara	65 km (40 mi)
Burren Way	Clare	Linear	Lahinch	Corofin	114 km (71 mi)
Cavan Way	Cavan	Linear	Dowra	Blacklion	22 km (14 mi)
Croagh Patrick Heritage Trail	Mayo	Linear	Balla	Murrisk	61 km (38 mi)
Dingle Way	Kerry	Circular	Tralee	Tralee	162 km (101 mi)
Dublin Mountains Way	Dublin	Linear	Shankill	Tallaght	55 km (34 mi)
East Clare Way	Clare	Circular	Killaloe	Killaloe	180 km (110 mi)
East Munster Way	Waterford; Tipperary	Linear	Carrick-on-Suir	Clogheen	75 km (47 mi)
Grand Canal Way	Dublin; Kildare; Offaly	Linear	Lucan Bridge	Shannon Harbour	117 km (73 mi)
Hymany Way	Galway	Linear	Portumna	Aughrim	55 km (34 mi)
Kerry Way	Kerry	Circular	Killarney	Killarney	214 km (133 mi)
Leitrim Way	Leitrim, Cavan	Linear	Leitrim	Dowra	27 km (17 mi)
Lough Derg Way	Limerick; Clare; Tipperary	Linear	Limerick	Dromineer	65 km (40 mi)
Lung Lough Gara Way	Roscommon; Sligo	Linear	Castlerea	Corradoo	58 km (36 mi)
Mid Clare Way	Clare	Circular	Newmarket-on-Fergus	Newmarket-on-Fergus	148 km (92 mi)
Miners Way and Historical Trail	Sligo; Roscommon; Leitrim	Circular	Arigna	Arigna	118 km (73 mi)
Monaghan Way	Monaghan	Linear	Monaghan	Inishkeen	65 km (40 mi)
Multeen Way	Tipperary	Linear	Milestone	Tipperary Town	23 km (14 mi)
Nore Valley Way	Kilkenny	Linear	Kilkenny	Inistioge	34 km (21 mi)
North Kerry Way	Kerry	Linear	Tralee	Ballyheigue	45 km (28 mi)
Offaly Way	Offaly	Linear	Cadamstown	Lemanaghan	37 km (23 mi)
Royal Canal Way	Dublin; Kildare; Meath; Longford; Westmeath	Linear	Ashtown	Abbeyshrule	79 km (49 mi)
Sheep's Head Way	Cork	Circular	Bantry	Bantry	90 km (56 mi)
Slieve Bloom Way	Laois; Offaly	Circular	Glenbarrow	Glenbarrow	84 km (52 mi)
Slieve Felim Way	Limerick; Tipperary	Linear	Murroe	Silvermines	43 km (27 mi)
Sligo Way	Sligo	Linear	Larrigan	Dromahair	78 km (48 mi)
Slí Gaeltacht Mhuscraí	Cork	Linear	Kealkill	Millstreet	70 km (43 mi)
South Leinster Way	Carlow; Kilkenny; Tipperary	Linear	Kildavin	Carrick-on-Suir	104 km (65 mi)
Suck Valley Way	Roscommon; Galway	Circular	Castlerea	Castlerea	105 km (65 mi)
Táin Way	Louth	Circular	Carlingford	Carlingford	40 km (25 mi)
Tipperary Heritage Way	Tipperary	Linear	The Vee Gap	Cashel	56 km (35 mi)
Western Way (Galway)	Galway	Linear	Oughterard	Leenaun	55 km (34 mi)
Western Way (Mayo)	Mayo	Linear	Leenaun	Ballycastle	124 km (77 mi)
Westmeath Way	Westmeath	Linear	Kilbeggan	Mullingar	33 km (21 mi)
Wicklow Way	Wicklow; Dublin; Carlow	Linear	Marlay Park	Clonegal	129 km (80 mi)

== Pilgrim paths ==
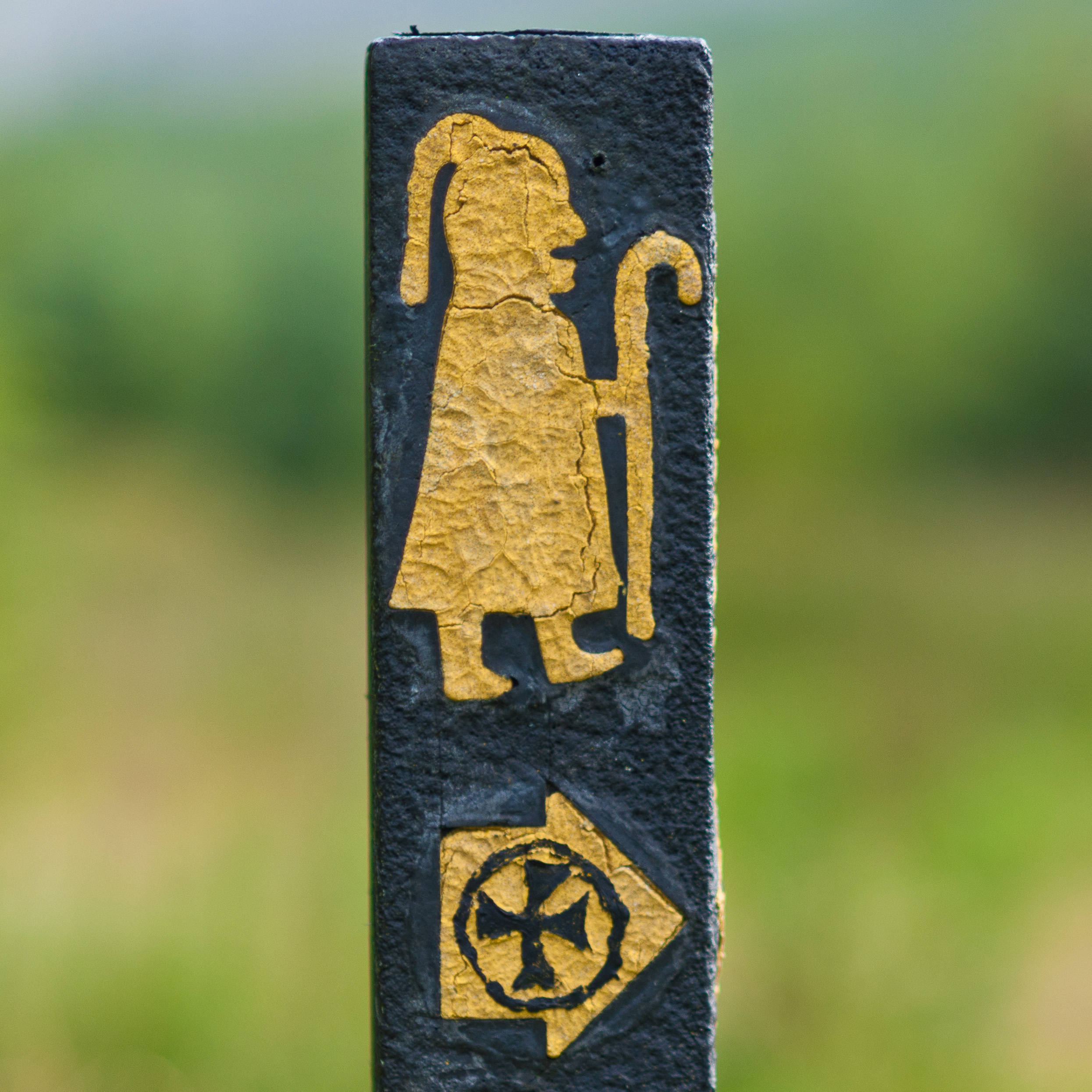
"Walking pilgrim" waymarker

Influenced by the work of the Council of Europe on the Camino de Santiago de Compostela in the 1980s and 1990s, the Pilgrim Paths Project was set up by the Heritage Council as its Millennium Project in 1997. The purpose was to develop and support a network of walking routes along Irish medieval pilgrimage paths to raise awareness of natural and built heritage along these routes and to contribute to tourism and community development.

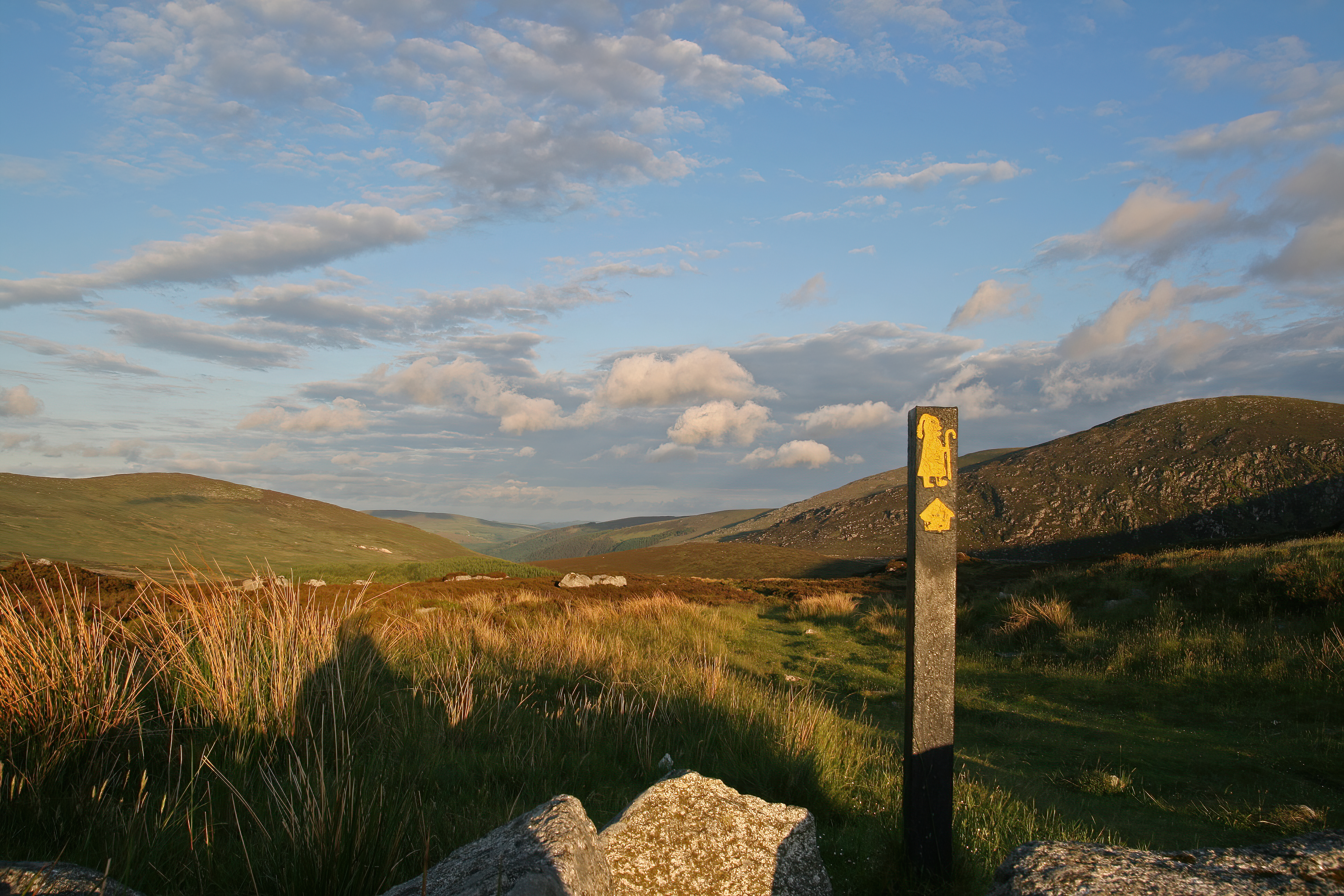
Saint Kevin's Way, Wicklow Gap

In 2013, Pilgrim Paths of Ireland (PPI) was set up as a non-denominational representative body for Ireland's medieval pilgrim paths, and represents 12 community groups supporting specific paths. PPI holds and annual National Pilgrimage Paths Week during Easter, and issues a National Pilgrimage Passport to finishers of the 5 main trails: Cnoc na dTobar, Cosán na Naomh, St. Finbarr's Pilgrim Path, Saint Kevin's Way, and Tochar Phádraig.

Name	County	Format	Start	End	Length	Time	Difficulty
Cnoc na dTobar	Kerry	Linear; Mountain	St. Fursey's Holy Well	Knocknadobar mountain	9.5 km (5.9 mi)	3.5 hours	Moderate
Cosán na Naomh	Kerry	Linear; Mountain	Ventry Strand	Brandon mountain	18 km (11 mi)	4–5 hours	Moderate
St. Finbarr's Pilgrim Path	Cork	Linear	Drimoleague	Gougane Barra	37 km (23 mi)	2 days	Strenuous
Saint Kevin's Way	Wicklow	Linear	Hollywood or Valleymount	Glendalough	30 km (19 mi)	7 hours	Moderate
Tochar Phádraig	Mayo	Linear; Mountain	Ballintubber Abbey	Croagh Patrick mountain	30 km (19 mi)	10 hours	Moderate

The routes follow the guidelines for National Waymarked Trails, with black marker posts with a yellow pilgrim symbol; this image is based on a stone from a pilgrimage site in County Cork which depicts a pilgrim with a Celtic tonsure, wearing a tunic and carrying a staff. Beneath the symbol is a directional arrow inset with a cross of arcs, one of the main symbols of pilgrimage in Ireland.

== Cycle greenways ==
As of March 2021, there were four greenways (mostly rail trails) in the Republic of Ireland:

Name	County	Format	Start	End	Length
Great Southern Trail	Limerick; Kerry	Linear	Rathkeale	Abbeyfeale	35 km (22 mi)
Great Western Greenway	Mayo	Linear	Westport	Achill	42 km (26 mi)
Waterford Greenway	Waterford	Linear	Waterford City	Dungarvan	46 km (29 mi)
Royal Canal Greenway	Kildare;Meath;Westmeath;Longford	Canal way	Maynooth harbour	Longford, and Cloondara	130 km (81 mi)

A project has been initiated to create an 80-kilometre (50-mile) Connemara Greenway along the route of the former Galway to Clifden Midland Great Western Railway. The Dublin-Galway Greenway has also been initiated. The 280 km route was planned to be completed by 2020. Sections of the route follow the Royal Canal from Dublin, as well as the disused Mullingar-Athlone rail line. Funding was made available for the development of a greenway on the former Tralee to Fenit railway line in County Kerry, with (as of 2011) the development of further greenways under consideration in other parts of the country. There is also a campaign to create a greenway on the Claremorris, County Mayo to Collooney, County Sligo section of the Western Rail Corridor.

The Royal Canal Greenway is due to be extended along the Royal Canal to Dublin to an expanded length of 144 km (89 mi).

== Boarded mountain paths ==
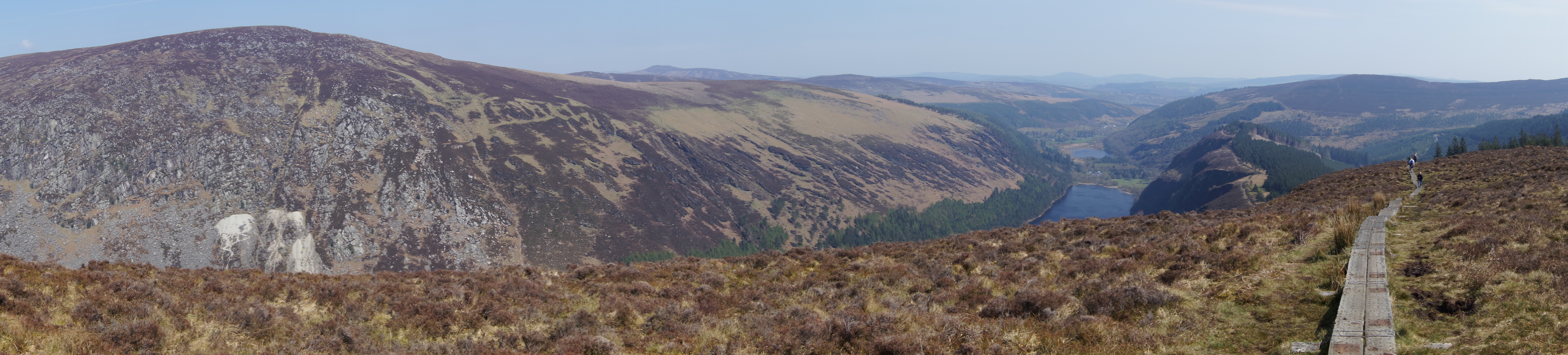
White Trail, The Spinc, Glendalough.

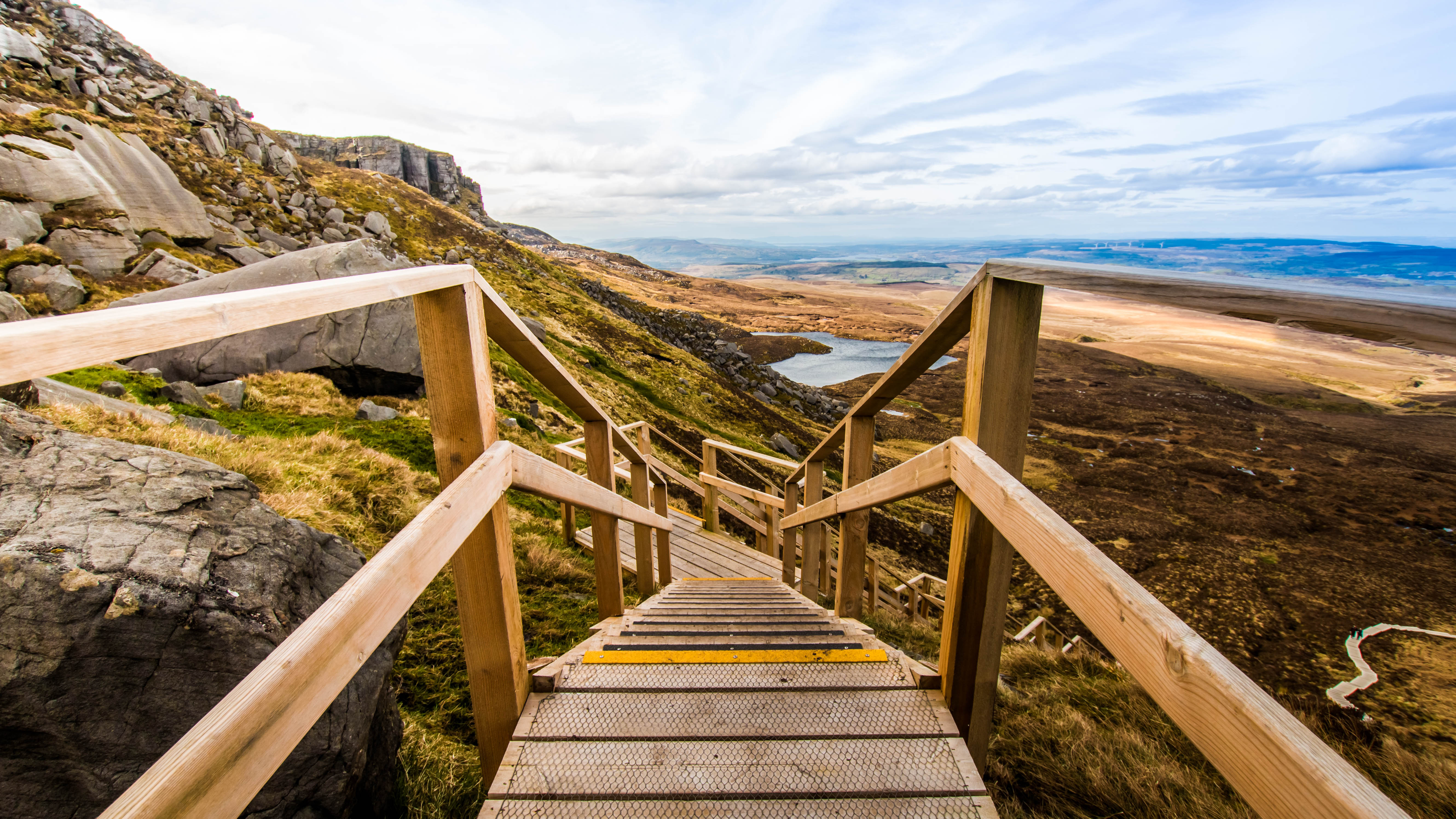
Stairway to Heaven, Cuilcagh.

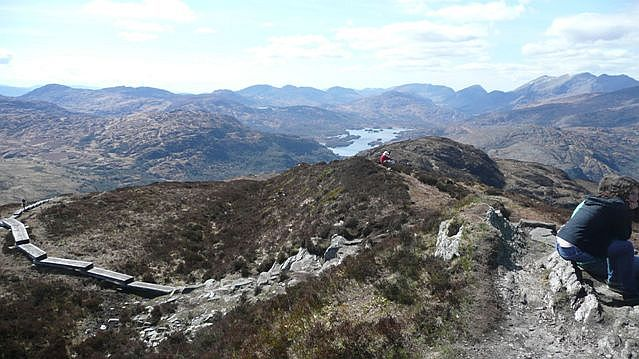
Boarded walk at Torc Mountain.

The Irish Office of Public Works (OPW) maintains a number of "boarded paths", often using railway sleepers, on some Irish mountains.

The driver of their creation has been to protect the underlying ground (often delicate bogland) from erosion by hill-walkers, however, in most cases, the creation of the paths has also materially increased the use and popularity of the paths by the public. When the Stairway to Heaven was opened in 2015, it was estimated that visitors to Cuilcagh Mountain increased from circa 3,000 per annum, to over 60,000 per annum.

As of June 2019, there are five boarded mountain paths (also called Tóchars by the NPWS) in Ireland:

- Cuilcagh "Stairway to Heaven" (Cavan/Fermanagh). A 7.5–kilometre boarded path to the summit of Cuilcagh mountain (e.g. a 15–kilometre round-trip), that was opened in 2015 to protect the underlying bog, but has since become a significant tourist attraction in the area.
- Diamond Hill. A 7–kilometre boarded and stone path round-trip trail that starts and ends at the National Park visitor centre in Letterfrack in Connemara. The mountain was closed to climbing in 2002 due to severe erosion but was re-opened in December 2005 after the completion of a Euro 1.4 million wooden boardwalk and stone path trail to limit further erosion; since construction, only Croagh Patrick has a higher footfall in Connemara mountains.
- Djouce (Wicklow). A 4–kilometre boarded path consisting of railway sleepers was constructed during 1997–1999 to protect the underlying bog from erosion due to the popularity of the mountain hill walking; the path does not go all the way to the summit, and instead, a gravel-track is used.
- Glendalough "Spinc/White Trail" (Wicklow). An 8–kilometre "loop-route" on the mountains surrounding the Upper Glendalough Lake, that takes in the rocky The Spinc outcrop and associated views into the valley below.
- Torc Mountain (Kerry). A boarded path to the summit that enables hill-walkers to complete the longer 8–kilometre Torc Waterfall to Torc Mountain summit route without requiring any special mountain footwear or navigation skills.

=== Teresa Wall vs NPWS (2016) ===
The future of boarded mountain paths and trails in Ireland was put in doubt when a climber, Teresa Wall, successfully sued the National Parks and Wildlife Service (NPWS) in the Circuit Court for €40,000 in 2016 for an injury sustained on the Djouce boarded walk (she required seven stitches after tripping on the boardwalk and cutting her knee near the J.B. Malone memorial stone); however, her award was overturned in February 2017 following a High Court appeal by the NPWS, which rejected her arguments that a "trip hazard" is the same whatever the location.

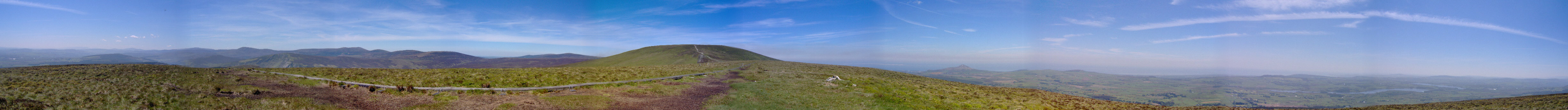
Southern slope of Djouce, at the minor peak of White Hill, showing the OPW boarded pathway to the summit of Djouce (r)

== Interconnecting trails ==
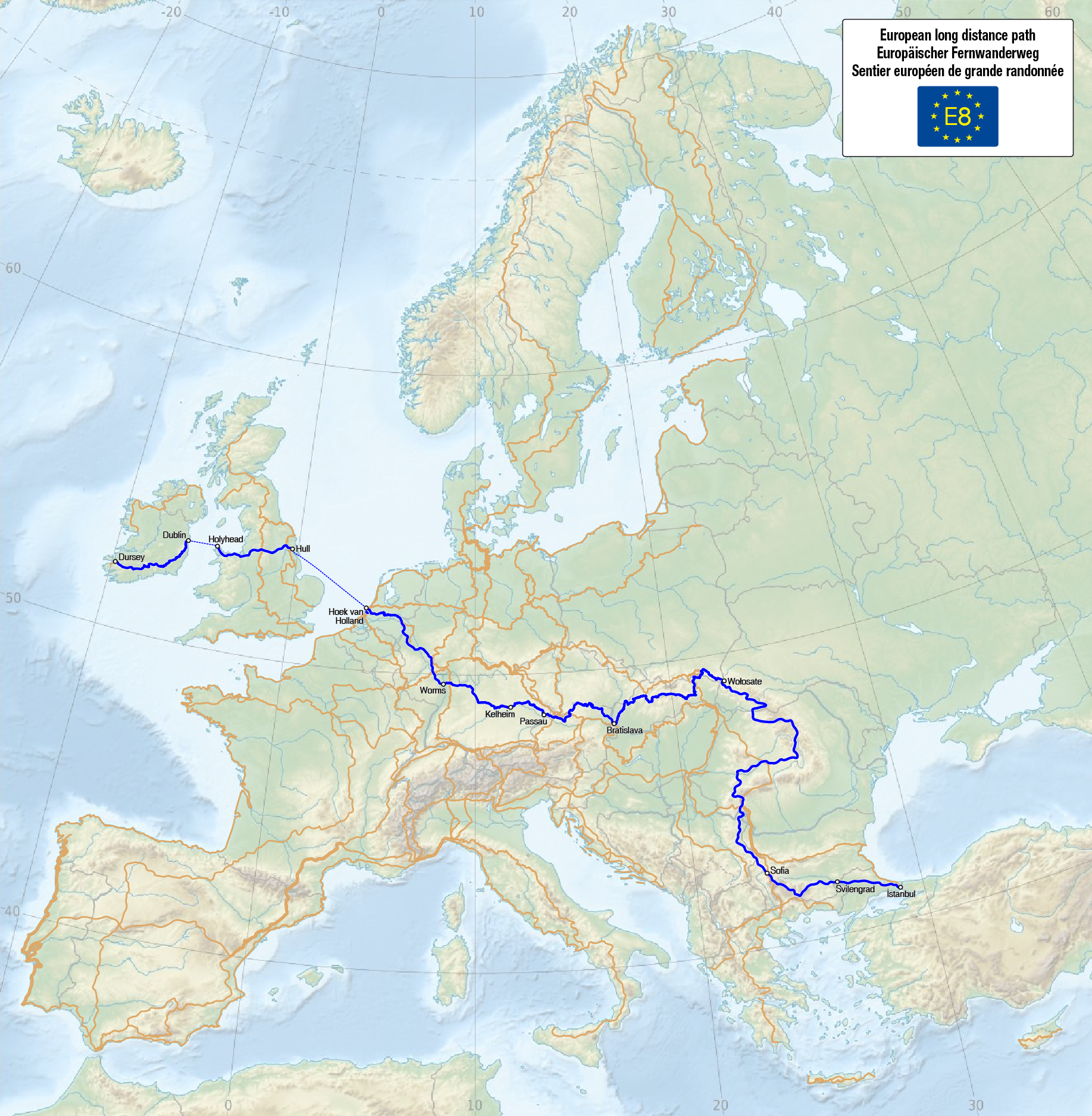
European walking route E8

=== National ===
Beara-Breifne Way is a walking and cycling route under development intended to run from the Beara Peninsula, Cork to Breifne, Leitrim following the line of Donal Cam O'Sullivan Beare's march in the aftermath of the Battle of Kinsale in 1602. The intended route will make use of the Beara Way; Ballyhoura Way; Suck Valley Way; Miner's Way and Historical Trail; Leitrim Way; and Cavan Way.

=== International ===
European walking route E8 is an international walking trail that extends from Dursey Island, County Cork to Istanbul in Turkey. In Ireland the E8 follows the Wicklow, South Leinster, East Munster and Blackwater Ways and parts of the Kerry and Beara Ways.

There is also a proposal to extend the International Appalachian Trail (IAT), an extension of the Appalachian Trail through Canada to Newfoundland, to all terrain that formed part of the Appalachian Mountains of Pangaea, including Ireland. It is proposed that the Irish leg of the IAT will make use of the Slí Colmcille and the Bluestack Way in County Donegal before joining the Ulster Way in Northern Ireland.

== See also ==
- Bangor Trail
- Malin to Mizen
- Wild Atlantic Way
- Lists of mountains in Ireland
- List of mountains of the British Isles by height

== Notes and references ==
=== Bibliography ===
- Dalby, Barry (2009) [1st pub. 1993]. The Wicklow Way Map Guide. Clonegal, Ireland: EastWest Mapping. ISBN 978-1-899815-24-1.
- Fewer, Michael (1996). The Way-marked Trails of Ireland. Dublin: Gill & Macmillan. ISBN 0-7171-2386-3.
- National Trails Office (2010). "Setting New Directions. A review of National Waymarked Ways in Ireland" (PDF). Dublin: Irish Sports Council. Archived from the original (PDF) on 31 May 2011.
- National Waymarked Ways Advisory Council (2006). "Irish Trails Strategy: Promoting and developing activity in the Irish Outdoors" (PDF). Dublin: Irish Sports Council. Archived from the original (PDF) on 31 May 2011.
- O Caoimh, Thomas (2004). "The Pilgrim's Path: Promoting Sustainable Development of Walking Routes through Sacred Sites in Ireland". Learning from World Heritage: Lessons from International Preservation and Stewardship of Cultural and Ecological Landscapes of Global Significance. 7th US/ICOMOS Symposium, 25–27 March 2004, Natchitoches, Louisiana, USA. Archived from the original on 6 October 2011.
- Wilson, Peter (January 1989). "The Expansion of Long-distance Walking Routes in Ireland". Irish Geography. 22 (1): 48–51. doi:10.1080/00750778909478786.
