= Western Way =

Long-distance trail in Ireland

Coordinates: 53.487°N 9.454°W

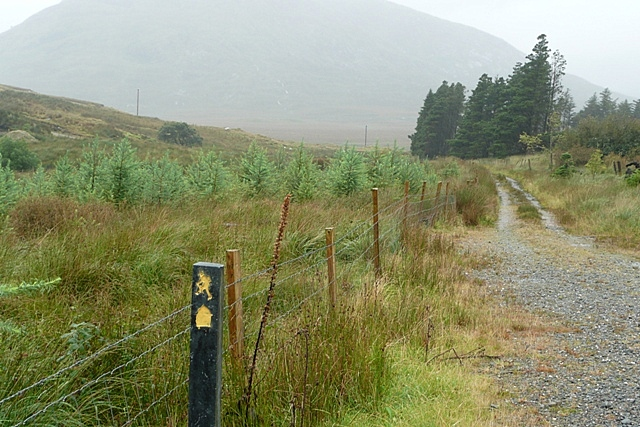
- The Western Way in Lettershanbally forest
- Length: 179 kilometres (111 miles)
- Location: Counties Galway & Mayo, Ireland
- Designation: National Waymarked Trail
- Trailheads: Oughterard, Ballycastle
- Use: Hiking
- Difficulty: Moderate
- Season: Any

The Western Way (Irish: Slí an Iarthair) is a long-distance trail in Ireland. It is 179 kilometres (111 miles) long and begins in Oughterard, County Galway and ends in Ballycastle, County Mayo. It is typically completed in seven days. It is designated as a National Waymarked Trail by the National Trails Office of the Irish Sports Council and is managed by Coillte, Galway County Council, Mayo County Council, South Mayo Development Company and Mayo North & East Development Company.

== Route ==
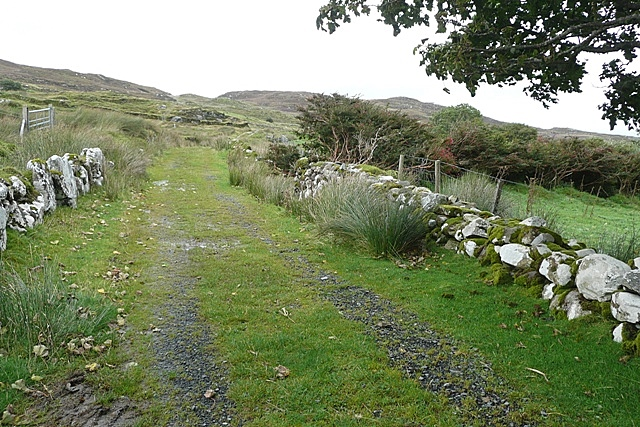
The Reek

=== Galway section ===
Starting from Oughterard, the trail follows the western edge of Lough Corrib before breaking away across the Maumturks chain at the pass of Maumeen. It descends to the Inagh Valley along the base of the "Turks", following them around to Leenaun at the head of Killary Harbour fjord. The Galway section ends here and the Mayo section begins.

=== Mayo section ===
From Leenaun, the Mayo section of the trail climbs over Sheefry Bridge, then down into Westport, then on through Newport, Sheskin, Ballycastle, Killala, Ballina, ending at Lough Talt in the Ox Mountains near the Sligo border. It is possible to continue on the Sligo Way.

==== Bangor Way & North Mayo walks ====
The Bangor Trail is a way-marked trail mainly across the blanket bog and fairly rough terrain of the Nephin Beg Mountain range. The trail links the town of Newport in mid west Mayo with the town of Bangor Erris in Erris, North Mayo. There are several looped way marked cliff walks along the North coast cliffs, Benwee Head and Glinsk overlooking Broadhaven Bay which start from Carrowteige.
