= Stillbrook Hill =

Mountain in Ireland

- Location within island of Ireland

Highest point
- Elevation: 514 m (1,686 ft)
- Prominence: 79 m (259 ft)
- Coordinates: 53°4′37.46″N 7°36′38.05″W

Geography
- Location: County Offaly, Ireland
- Parent range: Slieve Bloom Mountains
- Topo map: OSi Discovery 54

Geology
- Mountain type(s): sandstone, grit and claystone

Stillbrook Hill is a mountain in County Offaly, Ireland. With a height of 514 metres (1,686 ft) it is the second highest mountain in the Slieve Bloom Mountains after Arderin and the 520th highest summit in Ireland. It is the second highest mountain in County Offaly.

== See also ==
- List of mountains in Ireland
