= Táin Way =

Long-distance trail around the Cooley Peninsula in Ireland

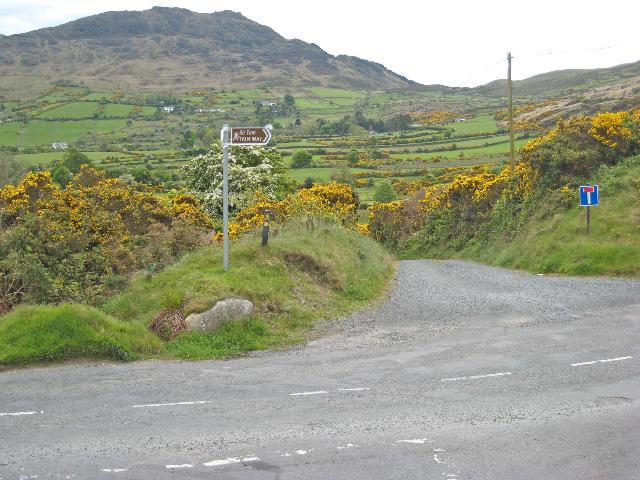
- Trail near Slieve Foy (Carlingford Mountain)
- Length: 40 kilometres (25 miles)
- Location: County Louth, Ireland
- Designation: National Waymarked Trail
- Trailheads: Carlingford
- Use: Hiking
- Elevation gain/loss: 1,025 m (3,363 ft)
- Difficulty: Moderate
- Season: all

The Táin Way is a long-distance trail around the Cooley Peninsula in County Louth, Ireland. It is a 40-kilometre (25-mile) long circular route that begins and ends in Carlingford. It is typically completed in two days. It is designated as a National Waymarked Trail by the National Trails Office of the Irish Sports Council and is managed by Louth County Council, Coillte and the Walks Partnership Group.

It takes its name from the Táin Bó Cúailnge (English: The Cattle Raid of Cooley), a legend of early Irish literature, many of whose events take place on the Cooley peninsula. The trail was devised by J. B. Malone and opened on 21 August 1986 by Liam Kavanagh, TD, Minister for Tourism, Fisheries and Forestry.

The trail starts in Carlingford, climbing along the northern slopes of Slieve Foy before crossing Clermont Pass, below Clermont Carn, to reach the village of Ravensdale. From Ravensdale, the route follows a ridge between Carnawaddy and Castle Mountain in the Cooley Mountains before crossing the southern flanks of Slieve Foy to return to Carlingford.

A review of the National Way-marked Trails in 2010 found moderate multiday usage and high day usage on the Táin Way and recommended the development of additional looped walks off the trail and rerouting of sections on tarred roads.
