= Offaly Way =

Trail in County Offaly, Ireland

Coordinates: 53.29296°N 7.74396°W

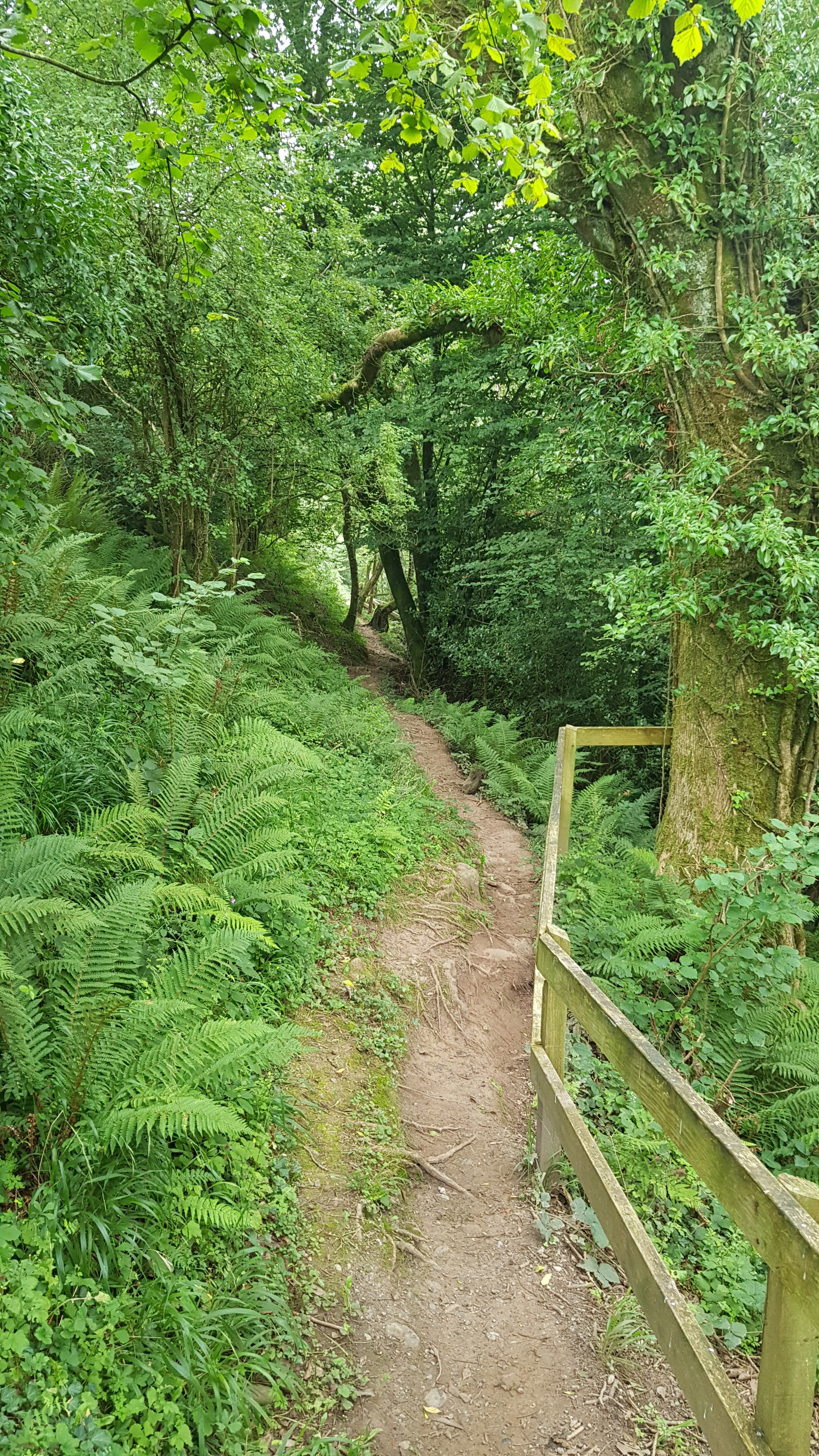
- Trail near Silver River, Cadamstown
- Length: 37 km (23 mi)
- Location: County Offaly, Ireland
- Designation: National Waymarked Trail
- Trailheads: Cadamstown, Lemanaghan
- Use: Hiking
- Highest point: 140 metres (459 ft)
- Difficulty: Easy
- Season: Any

The Offaly Way (Irish: Slí Uíbh Fhailí) is a long-distance trail in County Offaly, Ireland. It is 37 kilometres (23 miles) long and begins in Cadamstown and ends at Lemanaghan, on the R436 road between the towns of Clara and Ferbane. It is typically completed in two days. It is designated as a National Waymarked Trail by the National Trails Office of the Irish Sports Council and is managed by Offaly County Council, Bord na Mona and the Offaly Integrated Development Company. The trail provides a link between the Slieve Bloom Way and the Grand Canal Way.

Starting at Cadamstown, the trail follows an old mass path along the banks of the Silver River to reach Kilcormac. It then crosses Boora Bog, an area noted for its Mesolithic archaeology. It then passes through the Turraun Nature Reserve before crossing the Grand Canal and following the River Brosna to Lemanaghan.

A review of the National Waymarked Ways found low usage of the Offaly Way and recommended a reduction in the amount of walking on tarred roads, better interpretation of the historic sites along the route, consideration to extending the route to Clonmacnoise, Pollagh or Clara and consideration to promoting the trail as a dual walking and cycling route.

== Bibliography ==
- National Trails Office (2010). "Setting New Directions. A review of National Waymarked Ways in Ireland" (PDF). Dublin: Irish Sports Council. Archived from the original (pdf) on 31 May 2011.
