= North Kerry =

North Kerry or Kerry North may refer to:

- The northern part of County Kerry, in Ireland
- North Kerry (UK Parliament constituency), former UK Parliament constituency
- Kerry North (Dáil constituency), former constituency for elections to Dáil Éireann, Ireland

== See also ==
- Limerick–Tralee line, also known as the North Kerry line.
- North Kerry Way, a long-distance trail in County Kerry, Ireland
