= Baunreaghcong =

Third-highest mountain in the Slieve Bloom Mountain range, located in Ireland

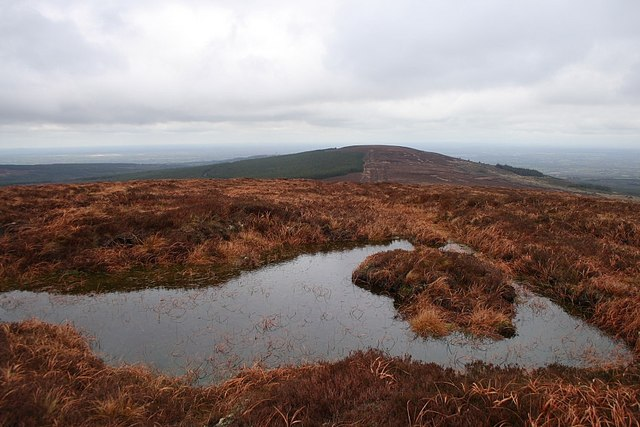
- Summit pond

Highest point
- Elevation: 509 m (1,670 ft)
- Prominence: 74 m (243 ft)
- Coordinates: 53°5′1.69″N 7°30′46.701″W

Naming
- Native name: Bán Riabhach Conga

Geography
- Location within island of Ireland
- Location: County Laois, Ireland
- Parent range: Slieve Bloom Mountains
- Topo map: OSi Discovery 54

Geology
- Mountain type(s): Sandstone, grit and claystone

Baunreaghcong (Irish: Bán Riabhach Conga, meaning 'narrow brindled pasture') is a mountain in County Laois, Ireland. Baunreaghcong stands at a height of 509 metres (1,670 feet).

== Geography ==
Baunreaghcong is the third-highest mountain in the Slieve Bloom Mountains and the 543rd-highest summit in Ireland. It is the second-highest mountain in Laois after Arderin, which is also in County Offaly, making Baunreaghcong the highest mountain fully in Laois.

== See also ==
- List of mountains in Ireland
- Geography of Ireland
