= Mid Clare Way =

Long-distance trail in County Clare, Ireland

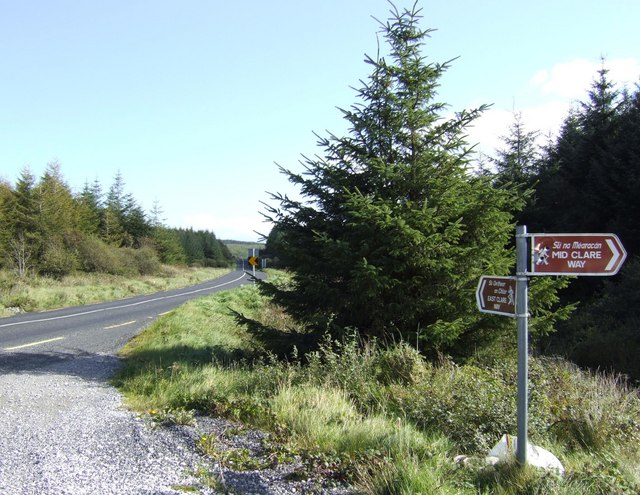
- Trail crossing R462 road
- Length: 148 km (92 mi)
- Location: County Clare, Ireland
- Designation: National Waymarked Trail
- Trailheads: Newmarket-on-Fergus
- Use: Hiking
- Elevation gain/loss: +1,620 m (5,315 ft)
- Difficulty: Moderate
- Season: Any

The Mid Clare Way is a long-distance trail in County Clare, Ireland. It is a 148-kilometre (92-mile) long circular route that begins and ends in Newmarket-on-Fergus. It is typically completed in six days. It is designated as a National Waymarked Trail by the National Trails Office of the Irish Sports Council and is managed by East & Mid Clare Way Limited and the Mid Clare Way Committee. The trail was developed over a six-year period and opened on 31 May 1999 by Síle de Valera, Minister for Arts, Heritage, Gaeltacht and the Islands.

The trail makes a circuit of the countryside surrounding the town of Ennis, taking in the villages of Quin, Spancil Hill, Doon, Ruan, Connolly, Lissycasey and Clarecastle. The trail connects with the East Clare Way at the townland of Gortnamearacaun.

A review of the National Waymarked Trails in 2010 found the condition of the route to be poor and usage to be low with a high proportion of the route (65%) to be on roads. The report recommended that format of the trail be examined and consideration given to the development of a series of shorter walks.
