= Barcam =

Mountain in County Offaly, Ireland

- Location within island of Ireland

Highest point
- Elevation: 484 m (1,588 ft)
- Prominence: 49 m (161 ft)
- Coordinates: 53°3′3.59″N 7°39′39.11″W

Naming
- Native name: An Barr Cam

Geography
- Location: County Offaly, Ireland
- Parent range: Slieve Bloom Mountains
- Topo map: OSi Discovery 54

Geology
- Mountain type(s): Sandstone, grit and claystone

Barcam (An Barr Cam) is a mountain in County Offaly, Ireland.

== Geography ==
The mountain stands at 484 metres (1,588 feet) high making it the fourth-highest mountain in County Offaly, the fifth-highest mountain in the Slieve Bloom Mountains, and the 613th-highest summit in Ireland.

== See also ==
- List of mountains in Ireland
