= Gaeltacht Way, Donegal =

Walking trail in County Donegal, Ireland

- Length: 280 km (170 mi)
- Location: County Donegal, Ireland
- Designation: National Waymarked Trail
- Trailheads: Dunlewey (Slí an Earagail); Dungloe (Slí na Rosann); Fintown (Slí na Finne); Ardara (Slí Cholmcille)
- Use: Hiking
- Difficulty: Easy to Moderate
- Season: Any

Gaeltacht Way, Donegal (Irish: Bealach na Gaeltachta, Dún na nGall) comprises four circular long-distance trails in the Gaeltacht (Irish speaking) areas of County Donegal in Ireland. All four trails are designated as a National Waymarked Trails by the National Trails Office of the Irish Sports Council and managed by Donegal County Council and Údaras na Gaeltachta.

== Trails ==
Slí an Earagail (Errigal Way) is 77 kilometres (48 miles) long and begins and ends in Dunlewey. It is graded as "easy' by the National Trails Office. The total ascent is 720 metres (2,360 feet). The trail follows a circular route around the forestry, countryside and coastline surrounding Errigal and passes through the villages of Gweedore, Falcarragh, Derrybeg and Bunbeg. The trail links to two shorter loop walks on Tory Island and Gola Island and there is also a 4.5 kilometres (2.8 miles) connecting trail to Slí na Rosann.

Slí na Rosann (Rosses Way) is 65 kilometres (40 miles) long and begins and ends in Dungloe. It is graded as "moderate" by the National Trails Office. The total ascent is 770 metres (2,530 feet). The trail explores the lakes and coastline of The Rosses region of Donegal and takes in the settlements of Burtonport, Annagry, Crolly and Maghery. The trail links to a loop walk around the island of Arranmore and there is also a 22 kilometres (14 miles) link trail from the townland of Crovehy to Slí na Finne, via Doochary.

Slí na Finne (Finn's Way) is 51 kilometres (32 miles) long and begins and ends in Fintown. It is graded as "moderate" by the National Trails Office. The total ascent is 980 metres (3,220 feet). The trail loops around the mountains around Lough Finn and the River Finn and passes through the villages of Cloghan and Commeen.

Slí Cholmcille (Colmcille's Way) is 65 kilometres (40 miles) long and begins and ends in Ardara. It is graded as "moderate" by the National Trails Office. The total ascent is 1,600 metres (5,200 feet). The route traverses the mountains and coastline of south-west Donegal, an area associated with Saint Colmcille, who gives his name to the trail. It passes through the villages of Kilcar, Carrick and Glencolmcille. Slí Cholmcille is proposed to be included in the Irish leg of the International Appalachian Trail (IAT), an extension of the Appalachian Trail through Canada to Newfoundland, to all terrain the formed part of the Appalachian Mountains on Pangaea, including Ireland.
