= Kerry Camino =

Pilgrimage route in Co. Kerry, Ireland

Coordinates: 52°15′31″N 9°44′09″W

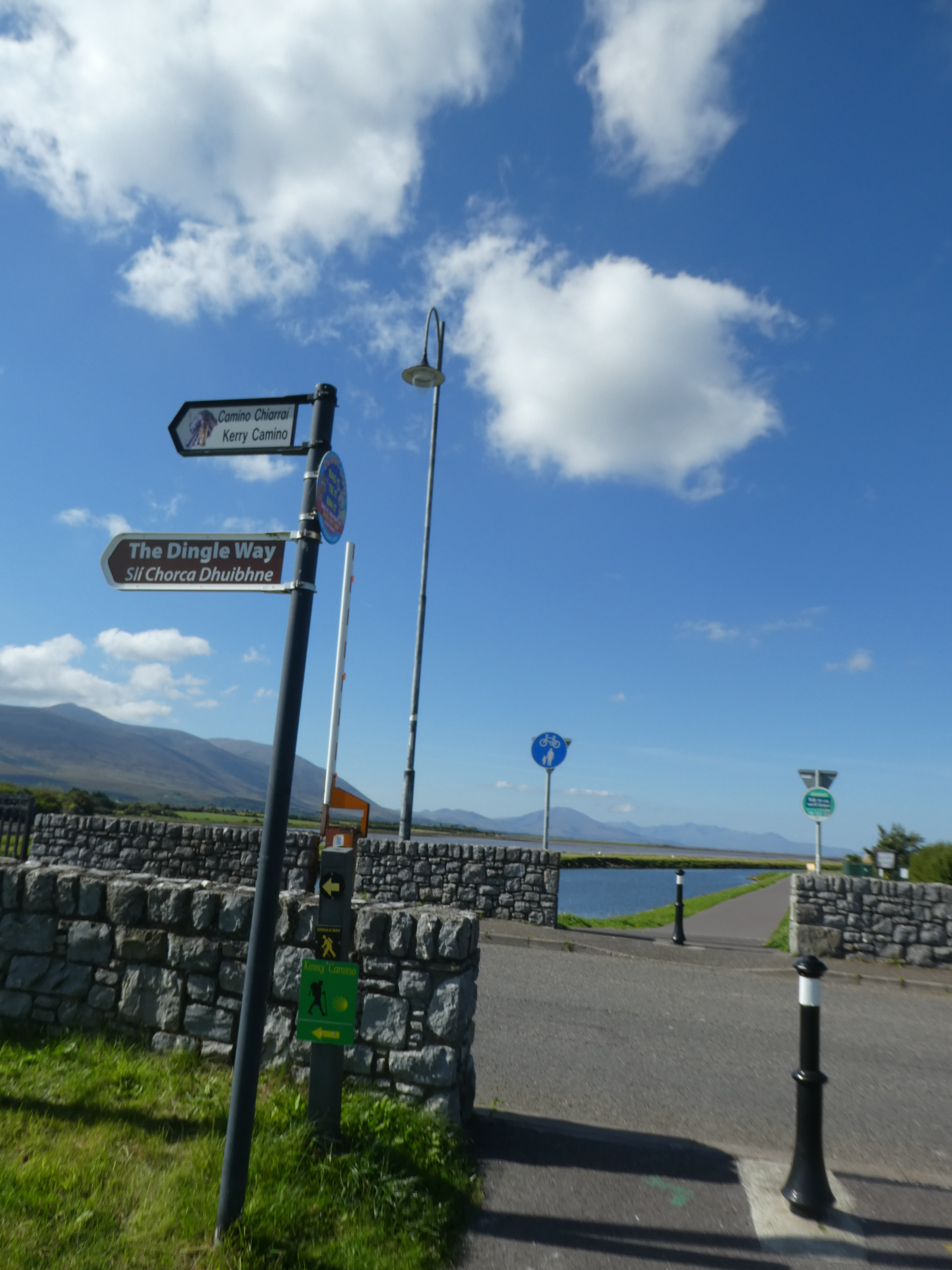
Road-crossing along the Kerry Camino

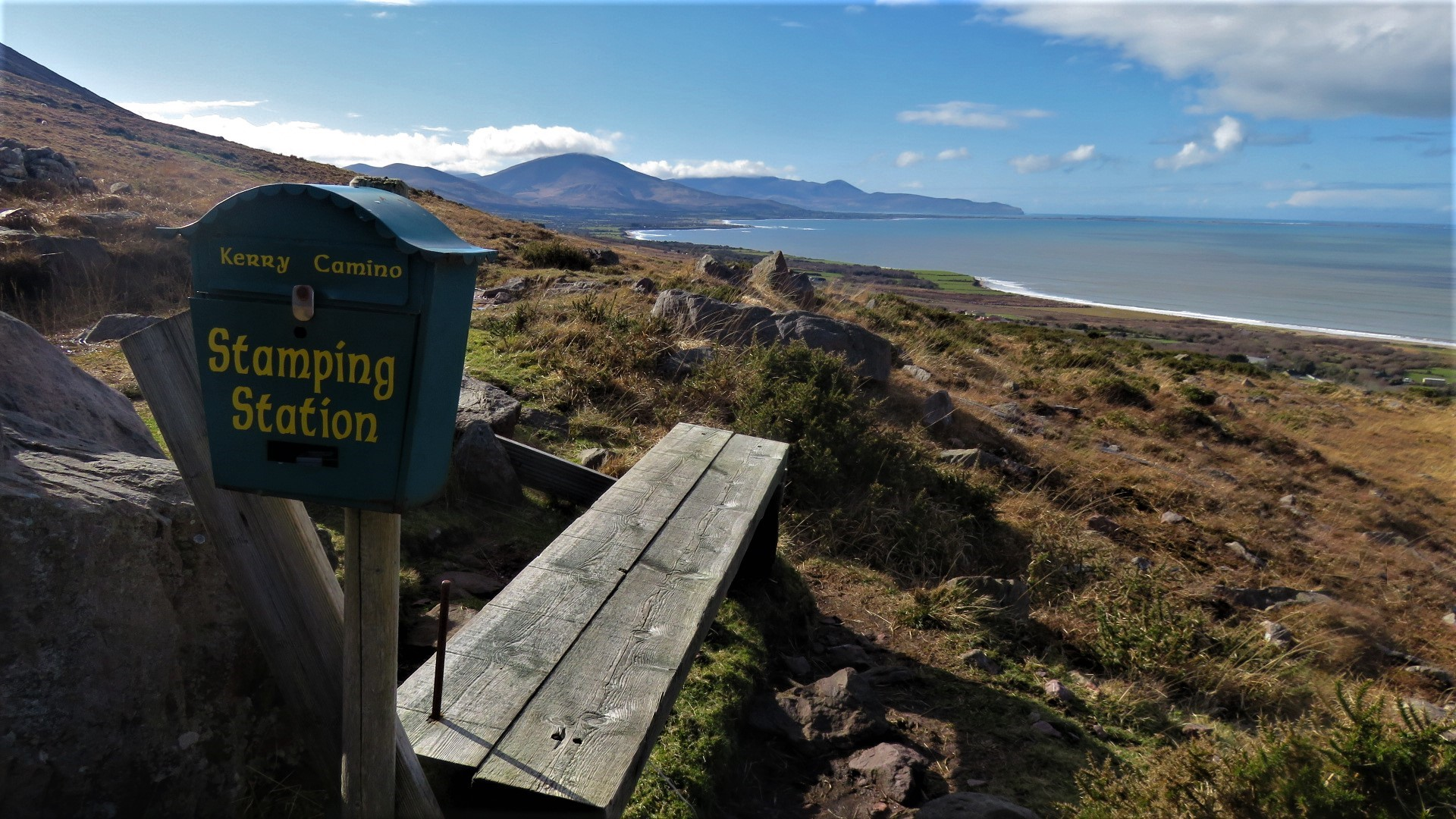
Stamping station, Dingle Peninsula, County Kerry

The Kerry Camino is a walk modelled on the Camino de Santiago in Northern Spain. The route comprises a section of the Dingle Way between Tralee and Dingle which has some of the most dramatic scenery and coastline in Ireland. The route purportedly follows a path taken by Saint Brendan, at present the route begins at the St. Johns Roman Catholic Church in Tralee and ends at St. James Church of Ireland in Dingle.
