= Croagh Patrick Heritage Trail =

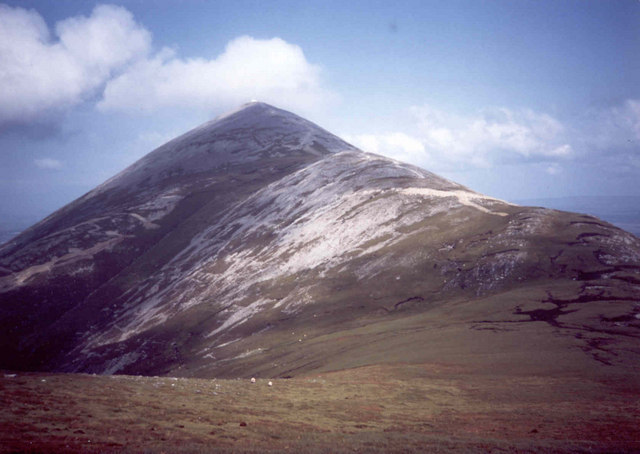
- Croagh Patrick
- Length: 61 kilometres (38 miles)
- Location: County Mayo, Ireland
- Designation: National Waymarked Trail
- Trailheads: Balla, Murrisk
- Use: Hiking
- Elevation gain/loss: +1,205 m (3,953 ft)
- Highest point: 310 m (1,017 ft)
- Difficulty: Moderate
- Season: Any
- Website: http://www.croaghpatrickheritagetrail.com/

The Croagh Patrick Heritage Trail (Irish: Siúlóid Oidhreachta) is a long-distance trail in County Mayo, Ireland. It is 61 kilometres (38 miles) long and begins in Balla and ends in Murrisk. It is typically completed in three days. It is designated as a National Waymarked Trail by the National Trails Office of the Irish Sports Council and is managed by the Tóchar Valley Rural Community Network. It was opened by Éamon Ó Cuív, TD, Minister for Community, Rural and Gaeltacht Affairs on 6 March 2009. The trail won the runners-up prize in the Heritage category of the 2009 Co-operation Ireland Pride of Place awards.

The trail travels in a westerly direction from Balla on a mixture of quiet roads, boreens, fields and forest and mountain tracks past the villages of Clogher, Ballintubber, Killavally and Aghagower before crossing the northern flanks of Croagh Patrick to reach Murrisk.

In November 2016, it was announced that a government fund of €34,600 would be made available for the trail's improvement. In addition, it was announced that €25,000 would be provided for the development of a Trailhead at Knock and to extend the section of the trail from Balla to Knock. Finally, it was made public that €9,600 would be provided for the implementation of updated signage on the Balla to Murrisk section of the route.
