= J. B. Malone =

Irish hill walker and writer

John James Bernard (J.B.) Malone
- 2014 exhibition on J. B. Malone
- Born: 13 December 1913; Leeds, England
- Died: 17 October 1989 (aged 75); Dublin, Ireland
- Education: Marist Brothers College, Grove Ferry, Kent
- Occupation(s): cartographer, draughtsman
- Known for: Writer on hill-walking Creator of the Wicklow Way
- Spouse: Margaret Garry
- Children: 3

John James Bernard (J.B.) Malone (13 December 1913 – 17 October 1989) was an Irish hill-walking enthusiast who popularised the pastime through his television programmes and books. He was responsible for the establishment of the Wicklow Way as a recognised walking trail, having first proposed it in 1966.

== Early years ==
Malone was born in 1913 in Leeds, England, to James Bernard Malone and his wife, Agnes (née Kenny), both from Dublin. He was raised mainly in England and completed his secondary education at the Marist Brothers College, Grove Ferry, Kent.

== Working life ==
Malone moved to Ireland in 1931 where he found employment in a builders’ providers firm and an insurance company before joining the Irish Army in 1940. There he became a cartographer in the intelligence section. In 1947, having left the army, he went to work at the Department of Posts and Telegraphs as a draughtsman. Malone remained employed in the Irish civil service until his retirement in 1979.

== Hill-walking ==
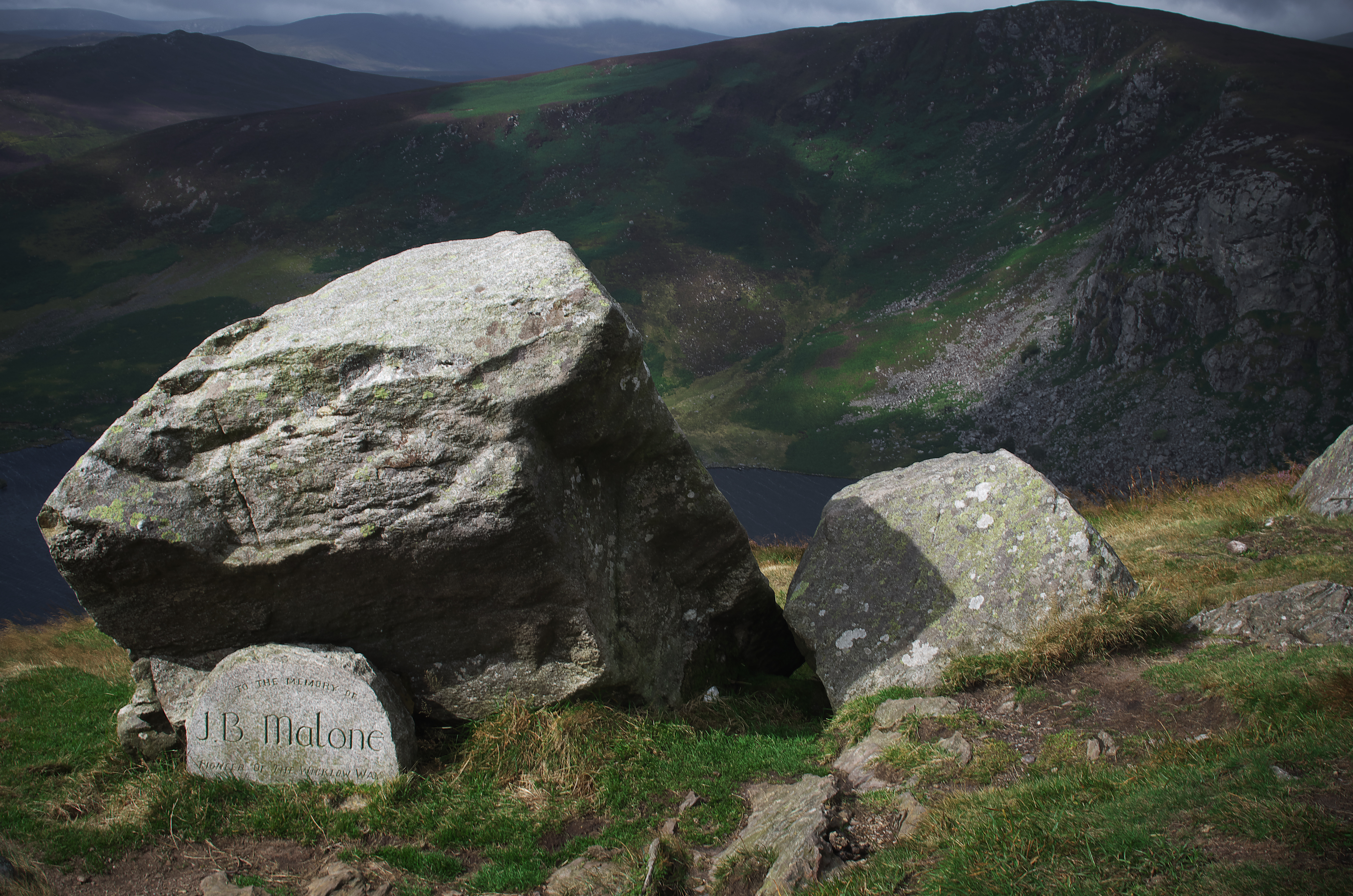
J.B. Malone memorial stone on Djouce Mountain in County Wicklow.

Malone started hill-walking in 1931 when he climbed Montpelier Hill to visit the ruins of the Hellfire Club. Later, while on leave during his military career, he developed a detailed knowledge of walking routes throughout the Wicklow hills. Malone sat on the Board of An Taisce in Ireland from 1970 to 1974.

=== Wicklow Way ===
Following his retirement from the civil service, he was appointed as a field officer with the Long Distance Walking Routes Committee of Cospóir, the National Sports Council. There, he negotiated rights of way with land-owners to enable his vision of the Wicklow Way to become a reality. Malone first proposed a guided walking route through the Wicklow hills in 1966, although he had first raised the idea as early as 1942.

=== Writing ===
From 1938 to 1975 Malone contributed a regular column to the Evening Herald entitled Over the Hills. Between 1967 and 1968 he wrote the column Know your Dublin, illustrated by Liam C. Martin. The column featured information on a Dublin landmark, and was later compiled into a book published in 1969.

During the 1960s, Malone presented a television documentary series on RTÉ entitled Mountain and Meadow, in which, accompanied by a cameraman, he introduced viewers to a variety of hill walks in Wicklow and surrounding counties. In 1980, he presented a one-hour TV programme on the newly opened Wicklow Way.

From 1950 to 1988, Malone wrote several books on hillwalking in the Dublin Mountains and the Wicklow Mountains.

== Awards and honours ==
In 1980, Malone was made an honorary life member of An Óige, the Irish Youth Hostel Association, in recognition of his contribution to promoting the Irish countryside.

Following his death in 1989, Malone's contribution to hill-walking in Ireland was marked by the erection of the J.B. Malone Memorial Stone plaque in his honour on a section of the Wicklow Way overlooking Lough Tay.

In October 2014, on the 25th anniversary of Malone's death, the South Dublin Libraries held an exhibition on his life and work.

== Personal life ==
Malone married Margaret Garry in 1947 and they had three children. He died at St. James's Hospital, Dublin at the age of 75 and is buried in Bohernabreena Cemetery, Tallaght.

== Publications ==
- J.B. Malone (1950). "The Open Road Guide to the Neighbourhood of Dublin for Ramblers, Cyclists & Motorists". Evening Herald. ASIN B00SHBSUSI.
- J.B. Malone (1964). Walking in Wicklow: A Guide for Travellers (afoot & awheel) through the Wicklow Mountains. Helicon. ASIN B0014M9PO0.
- J.B. Malone; Liam C. Martin (1968). Know Your Dublin. Sceptre Books. ASIN B0032QG12U.
- J.B. Malone (1988). The Complete Wicklow Way. O'Brien Press Ltd. ISBN 978-0862781583.

== See also ==
- Lists of long-distance trails in the Republic of Ireland
- Wicklow Way
