= Nore Valley Way =

- Length: 34 km (21 mi)
- Location: County Kilkenny, Ireland
- Designation: National Waymarked Trail
- Trailheads: Kilkenny, Inistioge
- Use: Hiking
- Difficulty: Easy
- Season: Any
- Website: http://www.trailkilkenny.ie/

The Nore Valley Way is a long-distance trail under development in County Kilkenny, Ireland. When completed it will be 34 kilometres (21 miles) long and begin in Kilkenny City and end in Inistioge. It is designated as a National Waymarked Trail by the National Trails Office of the Irish Sports Council and is managed by Trail Kilkenny, a group made up of representatives of Kilkenny County Council, County Kilkenny LEADER Partnership, Kilkenny Sports Partnership and local landowners. Two stages are open at present: the first from Kilkenny to Bennettsbridge and the second from Thomastown to Inistioge. The final section – linking Bennettsbridge and Thomastown – is under construction.

The Kilkenny to Bennettsbridge section is 12.1 kilometres (7.5 miles) long and follows the River Nore, passing the Black Marble limestone quarries, which give Kilkenny its nickname, the "Marble City", and Maddockstown, the home of the surveyor Arthur Oliver Wheeler and father of Everest pioneer Edward Oliver Wheeler. The Thomastown to Inistioge section is 10.9 kilometres (6.8 miles) long and follows the banks of the Nore past Grennan Castle, built in the 13th century by Thomas Fitzanthony, the 18th century Ballyduff House and Brownsbarn Forest.
