= Dingle Way =

Walking trail in County Kerry, Ireland

Coordinates: 52.267°N 9.706°W

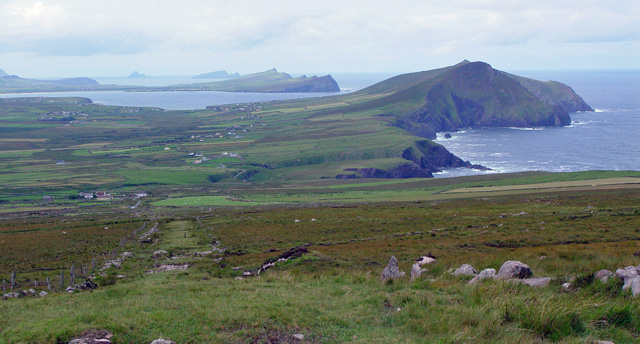
- Section of the Dingle Way near Smerwick Harbour and Ballydavid Head
- Length: 162 km (101 mi)
- Location: County Kerry, Ireland
- Designation: National Waymarked Trail
- Trailheads: Tralee
- Use: Hiking
- Elevation gain/loss: +2,590 m (8,497 ft)
- Highest point: Shoulder of Mount Brandon (640 m (2,100 ft))
- Difficulty: Strenuous
- Season: Any
- Sights: Dingle Peninsula
- Surface: Mountain, field and cliff paths; roads; beaches
- Website: www.thedingleway.ie

Map overview
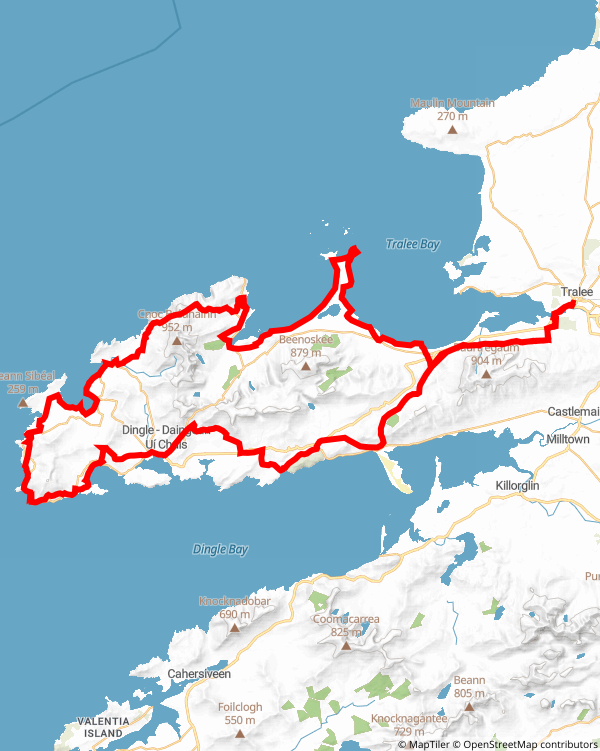

The Dingle Way (Irish: Slí Chorca Dhuibhne) is a long-distance trail around the Dingle Peninsula in County Kerry, Ireland. It is a 162-kilometre (101-mile) long circular route that begins and ends in Tralee and is typically completed in eight days. It is designated as a National Waymarked Trail by the National Trails Office of the Irish Sports Council and is managed by the Dingle Way Committee and Kerry County Council.

== Route ==
The trail begins in Tralee, following the towpath of the Tralee Ship Canal to Blennerville, after which it follows the road for a while before climbing up to a mountain track along the northern flanks of the Slieve Mish Mountains. From here it descends towards Tralee Bay and the village of Camp. The next few stages – Camp to Annascaul, via Inch Strand; Annascaul to Dingle, via Lispole; and Dingle to Dunquin, via Ventry – mainly follow minor roads and boreens. The latter section of the stage between Dingle and Dunquin follows a cliff path around Slea Head. The section between Dunquin and Ballycurrane follows a mixture of roads, beaches and cliff paths. The most mountainous stretch of the Way now follows as the trail ascends a saddle between Brandon and Masatiompan mountains. At 640 metres (2,100 feet), this is the highest point reached by any of the National Waymarked Trails in Ireland. The Way then descends to Brandon village and follows a trail to the village of Cloghane. From Cloghane, the trail follows Fermoyle Strand, Ireland's longest beach, to Fahamore, before following roads to the village of Castlegregory. The final stage follows the coastline to Camp before retracing the outward route to Tralee.

== Usage ==
A review of the National Waymarked Trails in 2010 found both multi-day and day usage of the Dingle Way to be high and recommended that work should commence to upgrade it to a National Long Distance Trail, a proposed new standard of trail in Ireland intended to meet international standards for outstanding trails. It also recommended that the development of looped walks off the main route should be considered.

Views along the Dingle Way
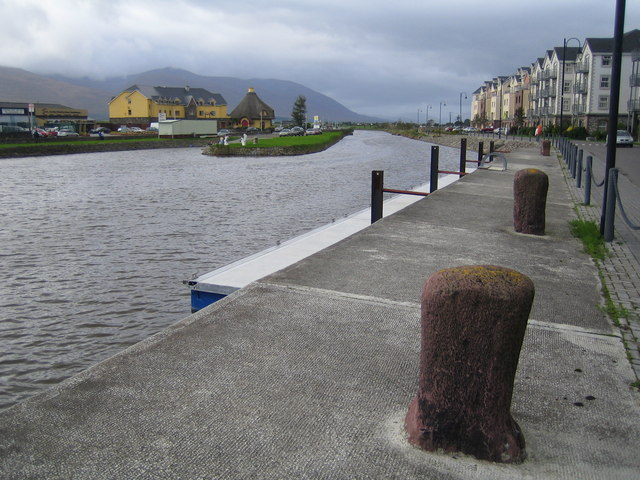
The old ship canal between Tralee and Blennerville

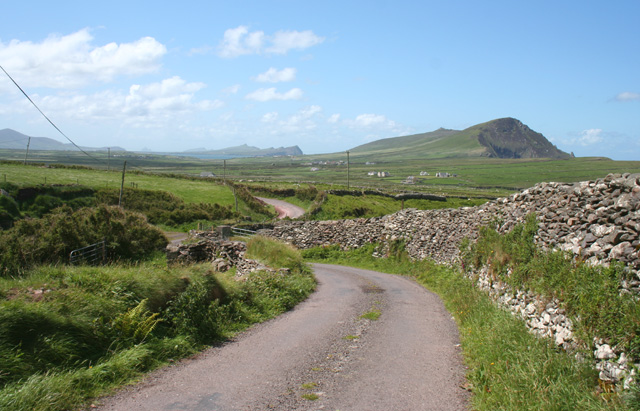
Tarmac road section, looking towards Ballydavid Head

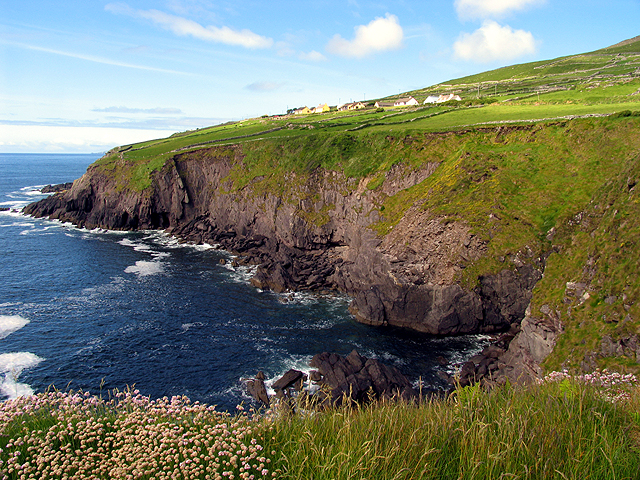
Cliffs near Slea Head

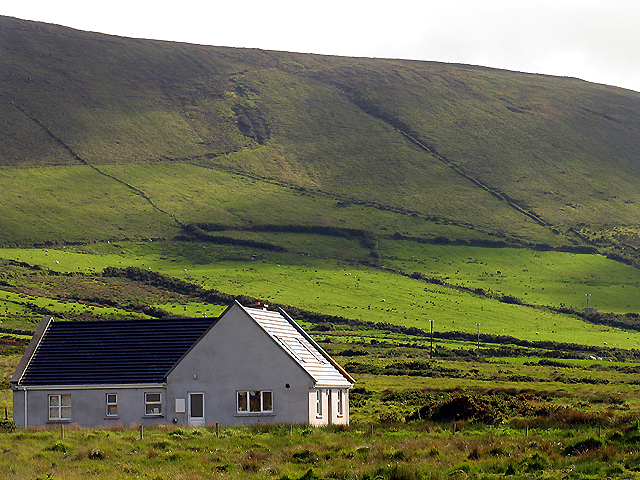
Hillside pasture and residence

A section linking St. Johns Roman Catholic Church in Tralee to St. James Church of Ireland in Dingle is known as the Kerry Camino.
