= Castleconor =

Mountain in County Laois, Ireland

- Location within island of Ireland

Highest point
- Elevation: 407 m (1,335 ft)
- Prominence: 32 m (105 ft)
- Coordinates: 53°4′15.77″N 7°34′50.19″W

Naming
- Native name: Caisleán Uí Chonchúir

Geography
- Location: County Laois, Ireland
- Parent range: Slieve Bloom Mountains
- Topo map: OSi Discovery 54

Geology
- Mountain type(s): sandstone, grit and claystone

Castleconor (Irish: Caisleán Uí Chonchúir) is a mountain in County Laois, Ireland. Castleconor's summit is at an altitude of 407 metres (1,335 feet) making it the fourth-highest point in Laois, the ninth-highest point in the Slieve Bloom Mountains and the 907th-highest summit in Ireland.

== See also ==
- List of mountains in Ireland
- Geography of Ireland
