= Ridge of Capard =

Mountain in County Laois, Ireland

- Location within island of Ireland

Highest point
- Elevation: 483 m (1,585 ft)
- Prominence: 48 m (157 ft)
- Coordinates: 53°5′27.81″N 7°29′19.84″W

Naming
- Native name: Droim na Ceapaí Airde

Geography
- Location: County Laois, Ireland
- Parent range: Slieve Bloom Mountains
- Topo map: OSi Discovery 54

Geology
- Mountain type(s): sandstone, grit and claystone

Ridge of Capard (Irish: Droim na Ceapaí Airde) is a mountain in County Laois, Ireland. Ridge of Capard's summit is at an altitude of 483 metres (1,585 ft), making it the third-highest point in Laois, the sixth-highest in the Slieve Bloom Mountains and the 615th-highest summit in Ireland.

== See also ==
- List of mountains in Ireland
- Geography of Ireland
