= Garraunbaun =

Mountain in County Laois, Ireland

- Location within island of Ireland

Highest point
- Elevation: 406 m (1,332 ft)
- Prominence: 31 m (102 ft)
- Coordinates: 53°0′35.37″N 7°42′30.72″W

Geography
- Location: County Laois, Ireland
- Parent range: Slieve Bloom Mountains
- Topo map: OSi Discovery 54

Geology
- Mountain type(s): sandstone, grit and claystone

Garraunbaun is a mountain in County Laois, Ireland. Garraunbaun's summit is at an elevation of 406 metres (1,332 feet), making it the fifth highest point in Laois, the tenth-highest point in the Slieve Bloom Mountains and the 911th-highest summit in Ireland.

== See also ==
- List of mountains in Ireland
