= Bluestack Way =

Walking trail in County Donegal, Ireland

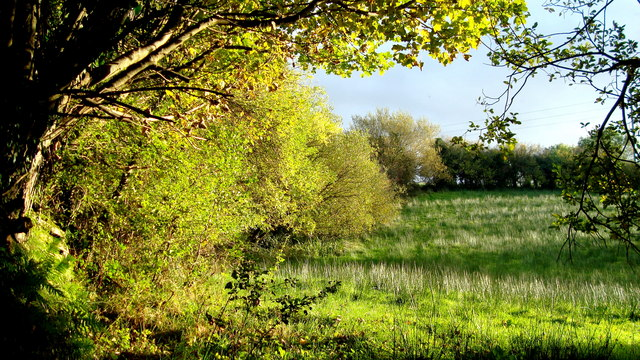
- Length: 65 km (40 mi)
- Location: County Donegal, Ireland
- Designation: National Waymarked Trail
- Trailheads: Donegal town, Ardara
- Use: Hiking
- Elevation gain/loss: +1,230 m (4,035 ft)
- Difficulty: Moderate
- Season: Any
- Surface: Bog roads, moorland, tarmac roads

The Bluestack Way (Irish: Bealach na gCruach) is a long-distance trail through the Bluestack Mountains in County Donegal, Ireland. It is 65 kilometres (40 miles) long and begins in Donegal town and ends in Ardara. It is typically completed in three days. It is designated as a National Waymarked Trail by the National Trails Office of the Irish Sports Council and is managed by the Bluestack Way Management Committee.

The trail was first proposed by a local environmental group, the Bluestack Environmental Group, and was opened in 2000. It was partly funded by the EU Peace and Reconciliation Fund and construction was carried out by workers on a FÁS Community Employment Scheme. A review of the National Waymarked Trails in 2010 considered that the trail was suitable to be upgraded to a National Long Distance Trail, a proposed new standard of trail in Ireland intended to meet international standards for outstanding trails, and also recommended that the development of looped walks off the main route should be considered.

Starting in Donegal town, the trail heads north to reach Lough Eske before crossing the Bluestack Mountains to the village of Glenties. From Glenties, it follows the course of the Owenea River to the end of the trail at Ardara.

The Bluestack Way is proposed to be included in the Irish leg of the International Appalachian Trail (IAT), an extension of the Appalachian Trail through Canada to Newfoundland, to all terrain that formed part of the Appalachian Mountains of Pangaea, including Ireland.
