= Wolftrap Mountain =

Mountain in Ireland

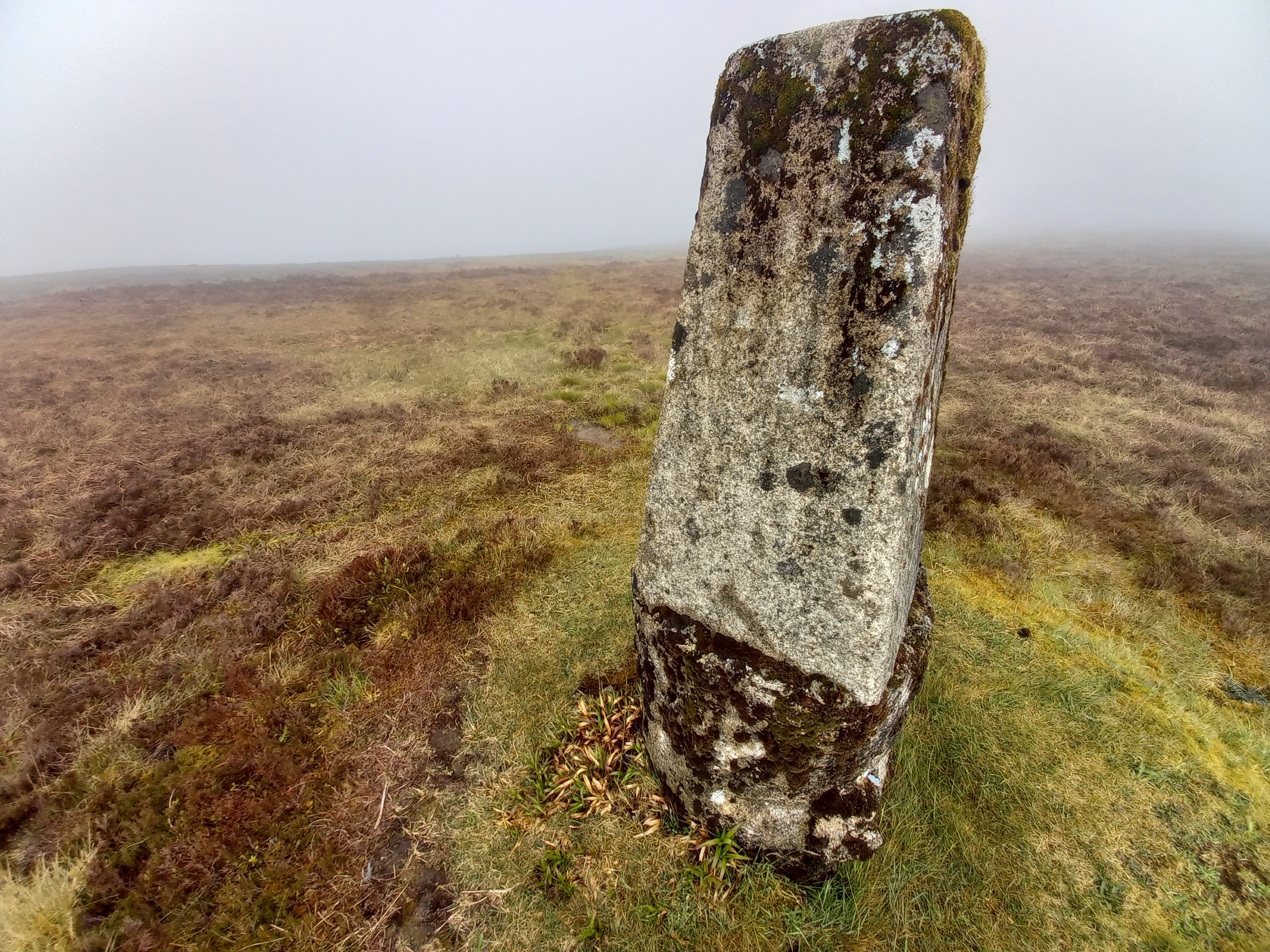
- Trig Pillar in the summit

Highest point
- Elevation: 487 m (1,598 ft)
- Prominence: 42 m (138 ft)
- Coordinates: 53°06′N 7°35′W

Naming
- Native name: Sliabh Ghaiste na Mac Tíre

Geography
- Location within island of Ireland
- Location: Location in Ireland
- Parent range: Slieve Bloom Mountains
- Topo map: OSi Discovery 54

Geology
- Mountain type(s): sandstone, grit and claystone

Wolftrap Mountain (Irish: Sliabh Ghaiste na Mac Tíre) is a mountain in counties Laois and Offaly, Ireland. The mountain is 487 metres (1,598 ft) high, making it the third-highest summit in Offaly, the fourth-highest mountain in the Slieve Bloom Mountains and the 602nd-highest summit in Ireland. It is the most northerly summit of the Slieve Bloom range.

== See also ==
- List of mountains in Ireland
