= Farbreague =

Mountain in Ireland

Coordinates: 53°01′N 7°42′W

- Location within Ireland

Highest point
- Elevation: 430 m (1,410 ft)
- Prominence: 45 m (148 ft)

Naming
- Native name: Fear Bréige

Geography
- Location: County Offaly, Ireland
- Parent range: Slieve Bloom Mountains
- Topo map: OSi Discovery 54

Geology
- Mountain type(s): sandstone, grit and claystone

Farbreague (Irish: Fear Bréige, meaning 'false man') is a mountain (Marilyn) in County Offaly, Ireland. It is a popular walking destination in the county. At 430 metres (1,410 ft) high, it is the county's sixth-highest mountain, the eighth-highest mountain in the Slieve Bloom Mountains and the 798th-highest summit in Ireland.

== See also ==
- List of mountains in Ireland
