= Slieve Bloom Mountains =

Mountain range in Ireland

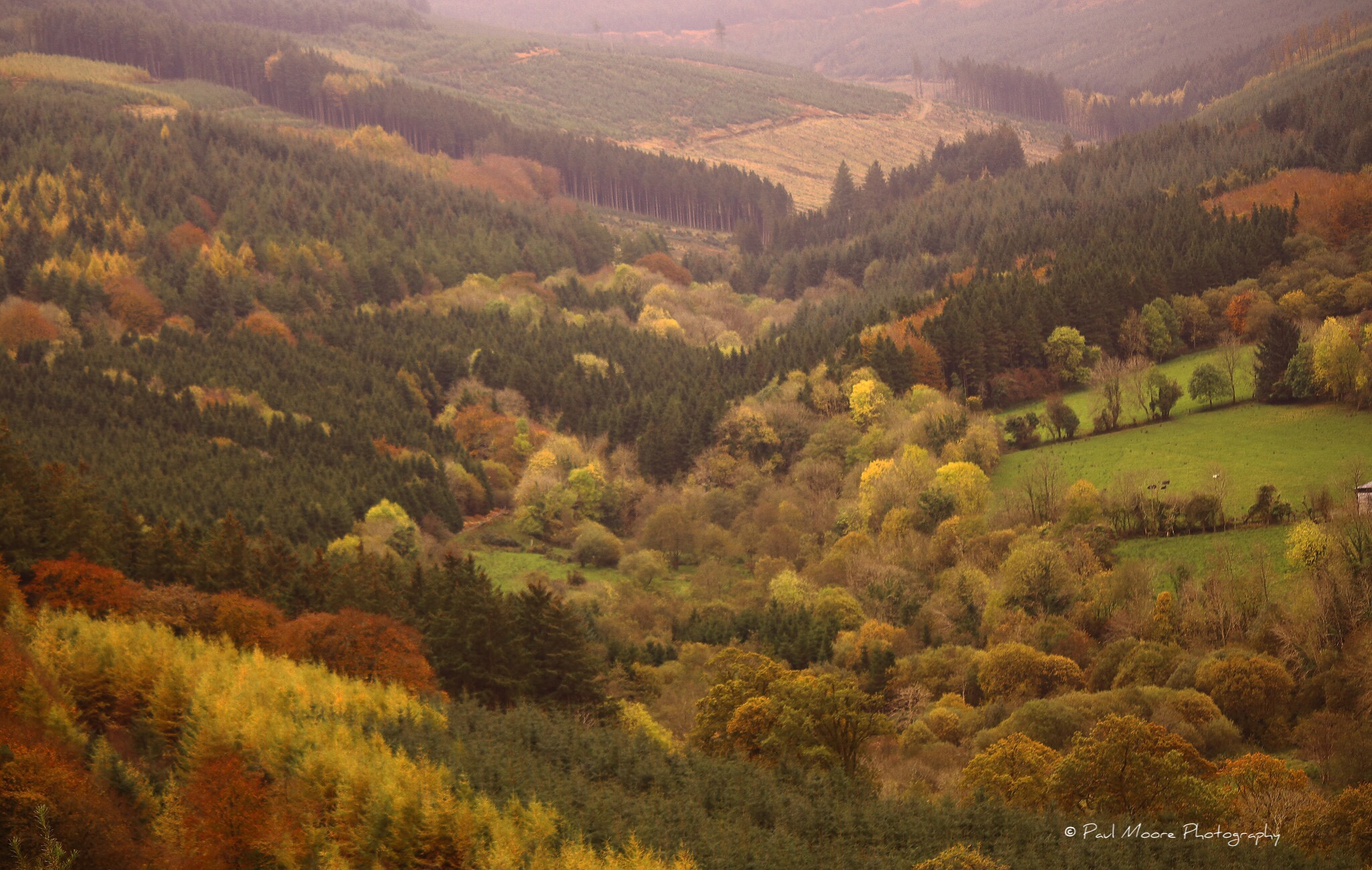
- The Slieve Blooms from the Glinsk Castle hiking loop

Highest point
- Elevation: 527 m (1,729 ft)
- Prominence: 197 m (646 ft)
- Coordinates: 53°06′N 7°34′W

Naming
- Native name: Sliabh Bladhma

Geography
- Location: Counties Laois/Offaly, Ireland

Ramsar Wetland
- Designated: 31 July 1986
- Reference no.: 335

The Slieve Bloom Mountains (Irish: Sliabh Bladhma) are a range of low mountains and hills in the central plain of Ireland, on the border of counties Laois and Offaly. The highest points are Arderin (527 m (1,729 ft)) at the southwestern end of the range, and Baunreaghcong (509 m (1,670 ft)) at the end of the Ridge of Capard.

The Slieve Bloom Mountains stretch from near Roscrea in the south west to Rosenallis in the north-west. Looped walking trails have been developed at six trailheads in the Slieve Blooms: Glenbarrow, Clonaslee, Cadamstown, Kinnitty, Glenafelly Forest Car Park and Glen Monicknew. Walking trails are colour-coded by difficulty. The 70 km (43 mi) Slieve Bloom Way can be accessed from any of these trailheads. The Silver River Eco Trail is near Cadamstown. A waterfall, Glenbarrow Falls, is located a few miles from Rosenallis. Some walking trails go to the falls and up to the Ridge of Capard. There is a significant population of red grouse in the hills. There are also several mountain biking trails in the Slieve Blooms, accessible via trailheads at Kinnitty Village and at Baunreagh near Mountrath.

The Slieve Blooms, along with the Massif Central in France, are one of the oldest mountain ranges in Europe; they were once also the highest at 3,700 m (12,100 ft). Weathering has reduced them to 527 m (1,729 ft). On a clear day, one can see the high points of the four ancient provinces of Ireland.

== Toponymy ==
According to the Bodleian Dinnshenchas, here are two theories of how the mountains were given their name:

[11. SLIAB BLADMA.] Bladma or Blod, son of Cú, son of Cass Clothmín, killed the cowherd of Bregmael, the smith of Cuirche, son of Snithe, King of Húi Fuatta. Then he went in his little boat till he set up at Ross Bladma — Ross n-Áir, "Wood of Slaughter," was its name at first. Thence he went to the mountain. Hence is "Sliab Bladma" (Bladma’s Mountain). Whence the poet said: ‘Blod, son of Cú, son of Cass Clothmín, Killed the cowherd of fair Bregmael, The smith of Cuirche Mór, son of Snithe: He set up at Ross Tíre ind Áir.’ Or it is Blod, son of Breogan, that died there; and from him the mountain of Bladma was named.

Edward J. Gwynn's The Metrical Dindshenchas give a longer account and another origin story (bleda mara "sea-monsters" cf. Modern Irish bleidhmhíol "monster; whale"):

Sliab Bladma Blod, son of Cu, son of Cass the renowned, son of Uachall the many-shaped, killed Bregmael the famous smith of Cuirche, son of Snithe the swimmer. Curche Cendmar was a daring king over Medraige and over Herot; through him Blod, son of Cass Clothmin, found never sure protection. He fared in his ship–clear purpose from the Bottom of pure-cold Galway, from Ath Cliath in wide Herot to Ath Cliath in Cualu. Thence he came after many a turn to the Point of Nar, son of Edliuc, and possessed, as his special portion, the mountain whose name derives from Blod. A valiant man who used to wage battle died at Sliab Bladma–vast renown even Blad, son of Bregon, with troops of warriors, died of disease in the monster-haunted Sliab Blod.

Or, it is from the son of Bregon the wrathful that it is named Sliab Bladma, with onsets of women their increase is not far from the cattle was the mountain where it happened through strong Blad.

Or the monsters of the sea that was not calm, beasts–ruisenda was their name–came throughout the land of the tribes, so that from them is named Sliab Bled. Blod, son of Cu, son of Cass Clothmin, slew the herd of Bregmael the smith of Curche, son of Snithe, he settled at Ross Tire Nair.

The Modern Irish meaning of bladhm is "flame; flare up", bladhma being the genitive case.

== History and mythology ==
The mountains formed the northern border of the kingdom of Osraige, and later Upper Ossory. Fionn Mac Cumhaill was brought up in Sliabh Bladhma by his aunts, his mother's sisters the poets Bovmall and Lia Luachra, so that he would be safe from Clann Morna, who had killed his father.

== Climate ==
Climate data for Slieve Bloom Mountains (Nealstown) (elevation 219 m) (1999–2022)
Month	Jan	Feb	Mar	Apr	May	Jun	Jul	Aug	Sep	Oct	Nov	Dec	Year
Record high °C (°F)	13.5 (56.3)	14.2 (57.6)	19.5 (67.1)	22.1 (71.8)	26.0 (78.8)	29.5 (85.1)	30.8 (87.4)	29.5 (85.1)	26.0 (78.8)	20.6 (69.1)	15.6 (60.1)	15.5 (59.9)	30.8 (87.4)
Mean daily maximum °C (°F)	7.4 (45.3)	7.8 (46.0)	9.9 (49.8)	12.9 (55.2)	15.7 (60.3)	18.3 (64.9)	19.4 (66.9)	18.8 (65.8)	16.5 (61.7)	13.1 (55.6)	9.5 (49.1)	7.7 (45.9)	13.1 (55.5)
Daily mean °C (°F)	4.4 (39.9)	4.7 (40.5)	6.0 (42.8)	8.3 (46.9)	10.9 (51.6)	13.6 (56.5)	15.1 (59.2)	14.6 (58.3)	12.6 (54.7)	9.6 (49.3)	6.4 (43.5)	4.8 (40.6)	9.3 (48.7)
Mean daily minimum °C (°F)	1.4 (34.5)	1.5 (34.7)	2.0 (35.6)	3.7 (38.7)	6.2 (43.2)	9.0 (48.2)	10.7 (51.3)	10.4 (50.7)	8.8 (47.8)	6.2 (43.2)	3.3 (37.9)	1.9 (35.4)	5.4 (41.8)
Record low °C (°F)	−11.6 (11.1)	−7.8 (18.0)	−6.8 (19.8)	−5.1 (22.8)	−2.5 (27.5)	0.1 (32.2)	3.8 (38.8)	3.4 (38.1)	0.4 (32.7)	−3.5 (25.7)	−6.4 (20.5)	−12.1 (10.2)	−12.1 (10.2)
Average precipitation mm (inches)	105.5 (4.15)	90.4 (3.56)	79.6 (3.13)	65.0 (2.56)	85.0 (3.35)	90.7 (3.57)	96.9 (3.81)	101.5 (4.00)	89.4 (3.52)	117.0 (4.61)	118.8 (4.68)	114.0 (4.49)	1,154 (45.43)
Average precipitation days (≥ 1.0 mm)	16.8	15.6	13.8	12.1	14.5	12.7	15.1	15.3	14.5	16.3	17.3	17.3	181.3
Source: Met Éireann

== Highest points ==
The following table lists the 10 highest major mountain peaks of the Slieve Bloom Mountains, all with a topographic elevation of at least 406 m (1,332 ft).

Rank	Mountain peak	Elevation
1	Arderin	527 m (1,729 ft)
2	Stillbrook Hill	514 m (1,686 ft)
3	Baunreaghcong	509 m (1,670 ft)
4	Wolftrap Mountain	487 m (1,598 ft)
5	Ridge of Capard	483 m (1,585 ft)
6	Barcam	482 m (1,581 ft)
7	Carroll's Hill	482 m (1,581 ft)
8	Farbreague	430 m (1,410 ft)
9	Castleconor	407 m (1,335 ft)
10	Garraunbaun	406 m (1,332 ft)
