= Tipperary Heritage Way =

Trail in County Tipperary, Ireland

- Length: 56 kilometres (35 miles)
- Location: County Tipperary, Ireland
- Designation: National Waymarked Trail
- Trailheads: Clogheen, Cashel
- Use: Hiking
- Elevation gain/loss: 150 m (492 ft)
- Difficulty: Moderate
- Season: Any

The Tipperary Heritage Way is a long-distance trail in County Tipperary, Ireland. It is 56 kilometres (35 miles) long and begins at the Vee Gap, near Clogheen, and ends in Cashel. It is typically completed in two days. It is designated as a National Waymarked Trail by the National Trails Office of the Irish Sports Council and is managed by Tipperary County Council, South Tipperary Integrated Development Company and the Tipperary Heritage Way Committee. The trail was opened on 7 September 2002 by Michael Smith, Minister for Defence.

== Route ==
Starting near the Vee Gap at Clogheen in the Knockmealdown Mountains, the trail follows the course of the River Suir to Cashel, via the towns and villages of Ardfinnan, Cahir and Golden. The route follows part of an ancient road, known as Saint Declan's Way, that connected Ardmore, County Waterford with Cashel. It passes various sites of historical interest such as Hore Abbey, Cahir Castle, Swiss Cottage before finishing at the Rock of Cashel.

== Vee Gap ==
The Vee Gap (Irish: Bóthar na gCorr), at the start of the heritage way, is located where the R668 road crosses the Knockmealdown Mountains, between Sugarloaf Hill and Knockshanahullion in Ireland. American country singer Johnny Cash visited the Vee Pass in 1959 at the time he composed the song "Forty Shades of Green".
