= Carroll's Hill =

Mountain in Offaly, Ireland

- Location within Ireland

Highest point
- Elevation: 482 m (1,581 ft)
- Prominence: 37 m (121 ft)
- Coordinates: 53°04′N 7°40′W

Geography
- Location: County Offaly, Ireland
- Parent range: Slieve Bloom Mountains
- Topo map: OSi Discovery 54

Geology
- Mountain type(s): Sandstone, grit and claystone

Carroll's Hill is a mountain in County Offaly, Ireland.

== Geography ==
The mountain stands at 482 metres (1,581 feet) high, making it the fifth-highest mountain in County Offaly, the seventh-highest mountain in the Slieve Bloom Mountains and the 617th-highest summit in Ireland.

== See also ==
- List of mountains in Ireland
