= Slieve Bloom Way =

Hiking trail in counties Laois and Offaly, Ireland

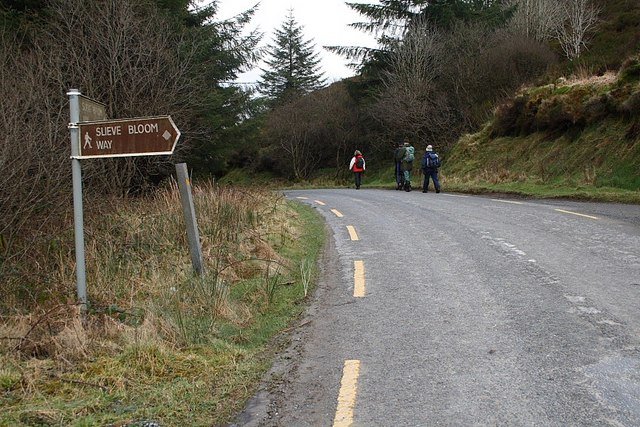
- Trail on R440 road
- Length: 70 kilometres (43 miles)
- Location: Counties Laois & Offaly, Ireland
- Designation: National Waymarked Trail
- Trailheads: Glenbarrow, Clonaslee, Cadamstown, Kinnitty, Monicknew, Ridge of Capard
- Use: Hiking
- Elevation gain/loss: +1,275 m (4,183 ft)
- Difficulty: Strenuous
- Season: Any

The Slieve Bloom Way is a long-distance trail around the Slieve Bloom Mountains in Ireland. It is a 70-kilometre (43-mile) long circular route that can be accessed from any of the trailheads at Glenbarrow near the village of Rosenallis, County Laois.Cadamstown, County Offaly Kinnitty, County Offaly. It is typically completed in three days. It is designated as a National Waymarked Trail by the National Trails Office of the Irish Sports Council and is managed by Laois County Council, Offaly County Council, Laois Integrated Development Company, Coillte and the Slieve Bloom Outdoors Group. The route was devised by a local man, Tom Joyce, and opened in 1987. The route was developed as part of the designation of the Slieve Bloom area as a European Environment Park in the European Year of the Environment.
