= North Kerry Way =

Walking trail in County Kerry, Ireland

Coordinates: 52°15′31″N 9°44′09″W

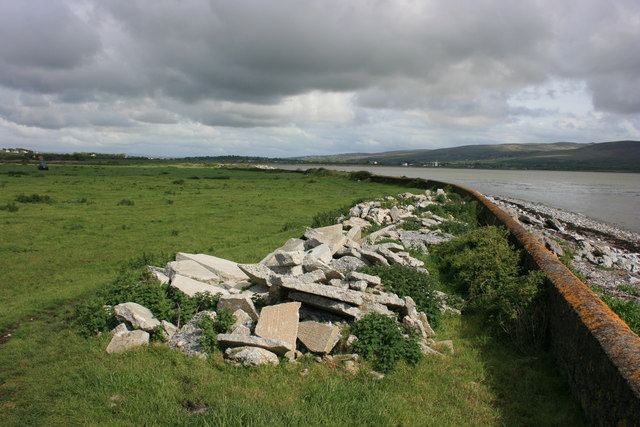
- Trail on Tralee Bay shoreline
- Length: 45 kilometres (28 miles)
- Location: County Kerry, Ireland
- Designation: National Waymarked Trail
- Trailheads: Tralee, Ballyheigue
- Use: Hiking
- Elevation gain/loss: 450 m (1,476 ft)
- Difficulty: Moderate
- Season: Any
- Website: http://www.northkerryway.ie/

The North Kerry Way (Irish: Slí Chiarraí Thuaidh) is a long-distance trail in County Kerry, Ireland. It is 45 kilometres (28 miles) long and begins in Tralee and ends in Ballyheigue. It is typically completed in two days. It is designated as a National Waymarked Trail by the National Trails Office of the Irish Sports Council and is managed by North Kerry Walks Limited.

The trail follows the coastline of Tralee Bay, beginning at Tralee and following the towpath of the ship canal to Blennerville and then along the coast to the village of Spa. It then crosses Banna Strand to reach Ballyheigue where a looped trail brings the route around Kerry Head and back to Ballyheigue.

A review of the National Waymarked Trails in 2010 found medium multiday usage and high day usage of the trail and recommended consideration be given to developing the trail as a National Long Distance Trail, a proposed new standard of trail in Ireland, intended to meet international standards for outstanding trails.
