= East Clare Way =

Trail in County Clare, Ireland

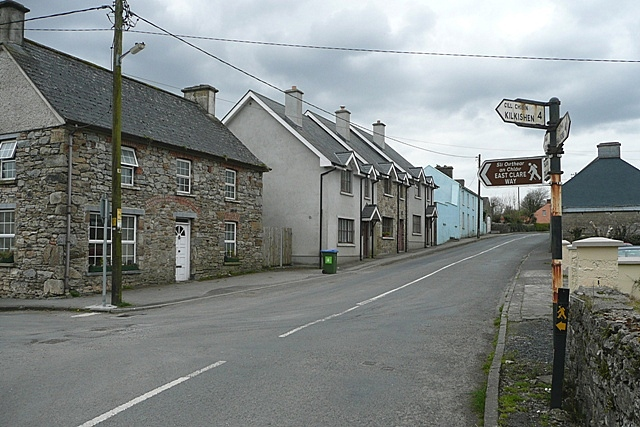
- Trail sign in O'Callaghans Mills
- Length: 180 km (112 mi)
- Location: County Clare, Ireland
- Designation: National Waymarked Trail
- Trailheads: Killaloe
- Use: Hiking
- Elevation gain/loss: +3,060 m (10,039 ft)
- Difficulty: Moderate
- Season: Any

The East Clare Way is a long-distance trail in County Clare, Ireland. It is a 180-kilometre (112-mile) long circular route that begins and ends in Killaloe. It is typically completed in eight days. It is designated as a National Waymarked Trail by the National Trails Office of the Irish Sports Council and is managed by East & Mid Clare Way Limited and the East Clare Way Committee.

The circular route explores the hills and lakes to the west of Lough Derg and takes in the towns and villages of Kilbane, Broadford, O'Callaghans Mills, Tulla, Feakle, Flagmount, Mountshannon and Scarriff. The northern sections of the trail cross the Slieve Aughty Mountains.

A review of the National Waymarked Trails in 2010 found the proportion of road walking on the East Clare Way (53%) to be high and recommended that work be undertaken to take more of the trail off-road.
