= Monaghan Way =

- Length: 65 km (40 mi)
- Location: County Monaghan, Ireland
- Designation: National Waymarked Trail
- Trailheads: Monaghan Town, Inniskeen
- Use: Hiking
- Highest point: Mullyash (317 m (1,040 ft)
- Difficulty: Moderate
- Season: Any

The Monaghan Way (Irish: Slí Mhuineacháin) is a long-distance trail in County Monaghan, Ireland. It is 21-kilometre (13-mile) long and begins in Inniskeen and ends at Lough Muckno outside Castleblaney. It is typically completed in one long day or two shorter days. It is designated as a National Waymarked Trail by the [Irish Sports Council] and is managed by Monaghan County Council and the Monaghan Way Committee.

The trail begins in Inniskeen and travels north towards Castleblayney, following the alignment of a disused railway line along the River Fane and Lough Ross to reach the end at Annadrumman, Lough Muckno.
