= Arderin =

Mountain in Laois/Offaly, Ireland

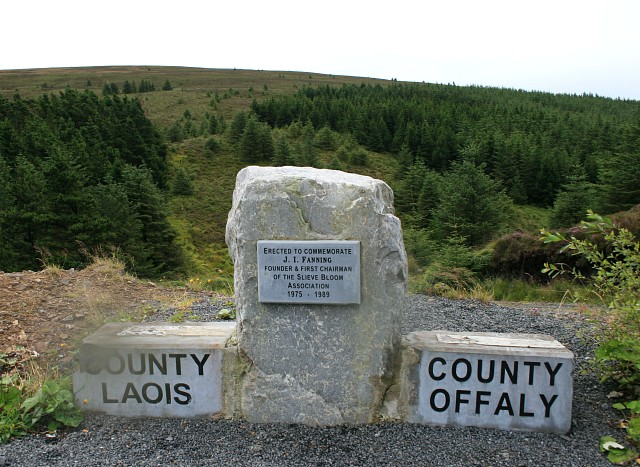
- Arderin from the Glendine Gap

Highest point
- Elevation: 527 m (1,729 ft)
- Prominence: 420 m (1,380 ft)
- Listing: County Top (Laois and Offaly), Marilyn
- Coordinates: 53°02′17″N 7°39′14″W

Naming
- Native name: Ard Éireann
- English translation: Ireland's Height

Geography
- Location within Ireland
- Location: Counties Laois & Offaly, Ireland
- Parent range: Slieve Bloom Mountains
- OSI/OSNI grid: S232989
- Topo map: OSi Discovery 54

Arderin (Irish: Ard Éireann, meaning 'Ireland's height') is a mountain on the border between counties Laois and Offaly in Ireland. With a height of 527 metres (1,729 ft) it is the highest point in the Slieve Bloom Mountains, and is the highest point in both counties.

An Arderin is also a descriptive word for a specific category of Irish mountains in the series of lists maintained by Irish mountain database, MountainViews; those over 500m with a prominence of at least 30m. This list, along with other complementary ones, has been published in book form by Collins Press. Mountainviews.ie classifies a mountain as being above 500m, but also maintains a number of lists of hills below this threshold.

== See also ==
- Lists of mountains in Ireland
- List of Irish counties by highest point
- List of mountains of the British Isles by height
- List of Marilyns in the British Isles
