= Cadamstown =

Village in County Offaly, Ireland

Cadamstown Baile Mhic Ádaim
- Village
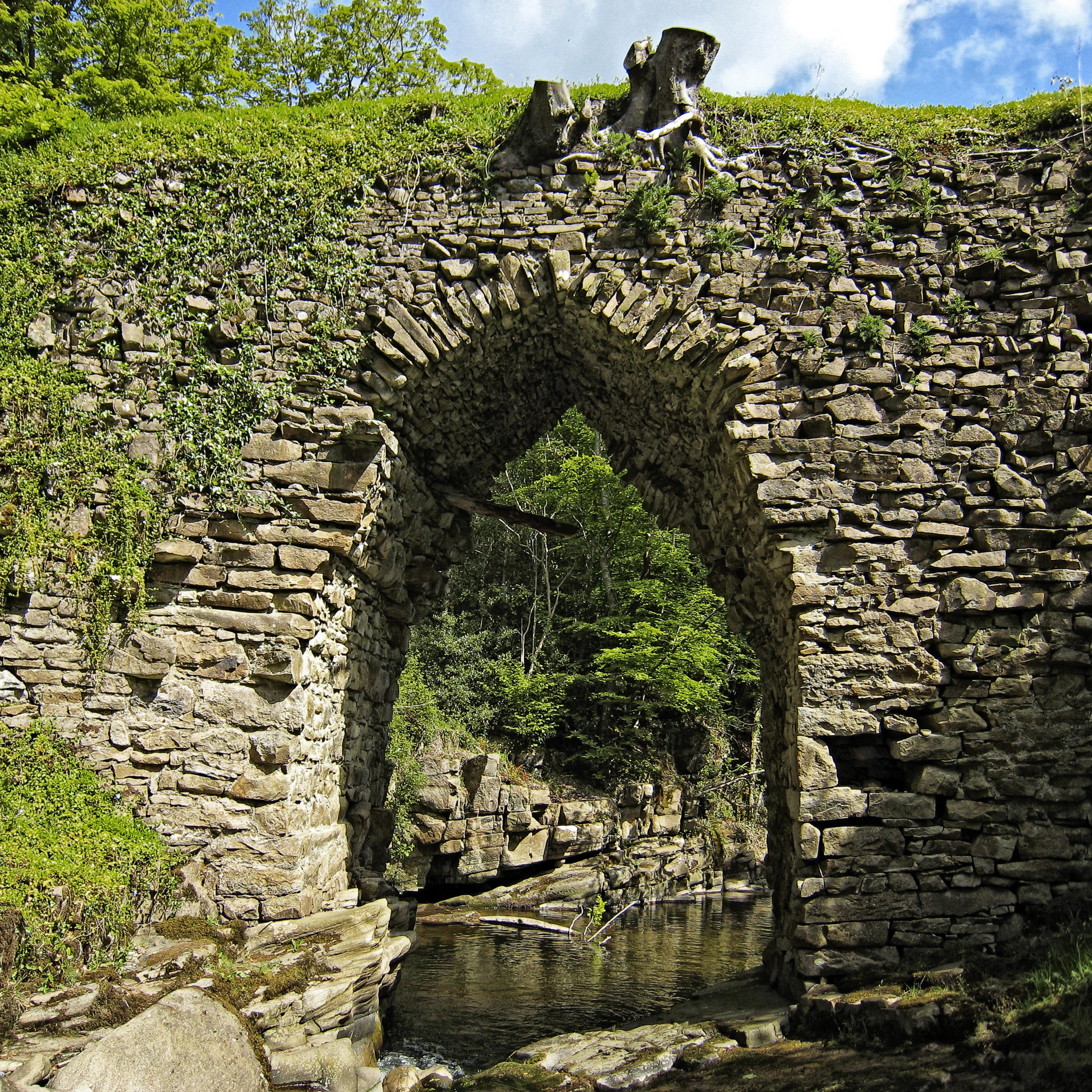
- Cadamstown Bridge, over the Silver River

- Location in Ireland
- Coordinates: 53°7′36″N 7°39′13″W
- Country: Ireland
- Province: Leinster
- County: Offaly
- Time zone: UTC+0 (WET)
  - Summer (DST): UTC+1 (IST (WEST))

Cadamstown, historically called Ballymacadam (Irish: Baile Mhic Ádaim, meaning 'MacAdam's town'), is a small village in County Offaly, Ireland. It lies on the R421 regional road, just north of the Slieve Bloom Mountains. It is about 20 km from Tullamore and 6 km from Kinnitty.

== Features ==
The village is divided by the gorge of the Silver River, which is crossed by the R421. The road forms the Main Street of the village. The plan is predominantly linear, centred on the bridge over the Silver River and comprises a Church, public house and approximately 20 houses, with a population of approximately 60 people. The Mill is to the west and the Ardara Masonry Bridge (which has been taken into National care) is to the north. The Offaly Way begins in the village.

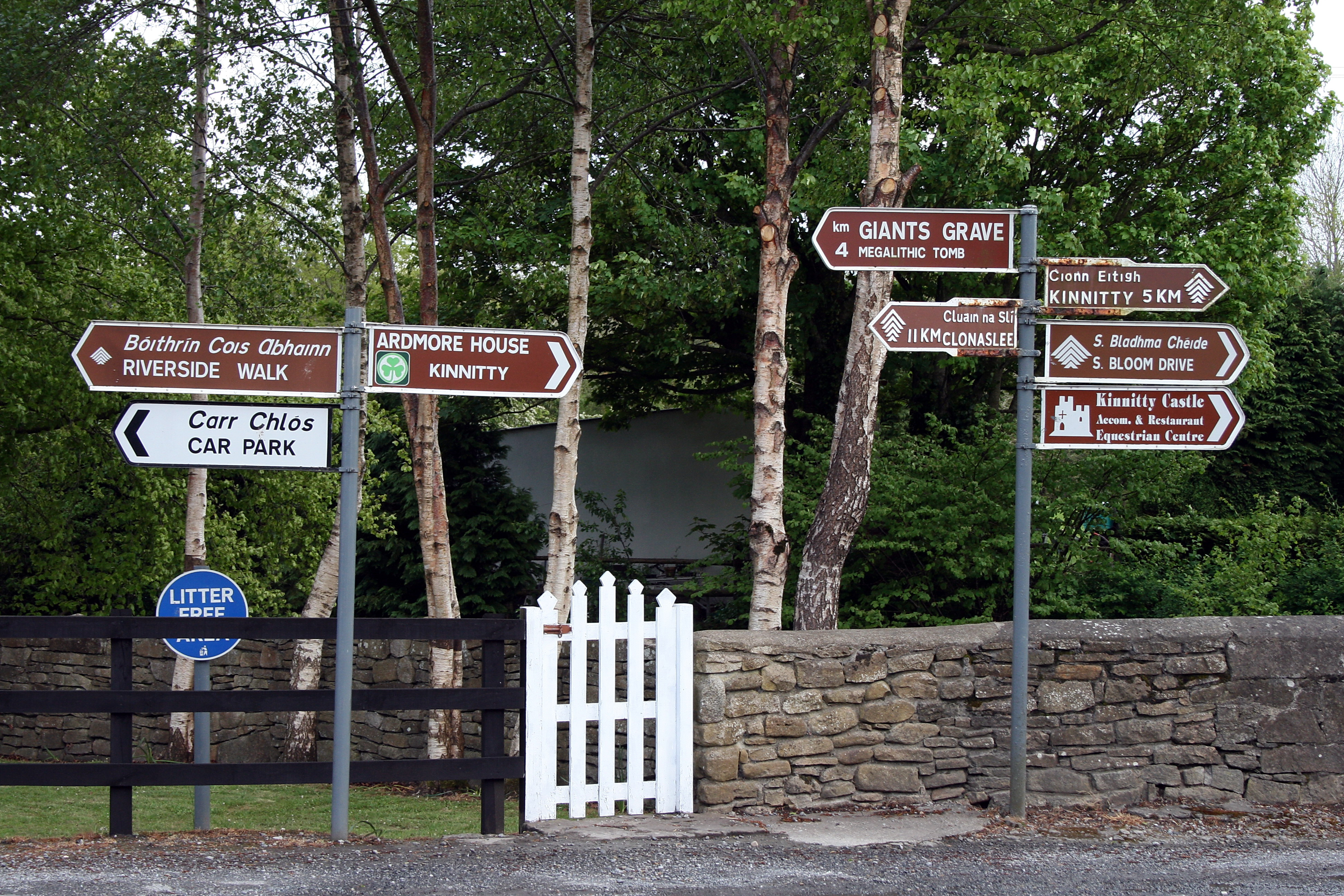

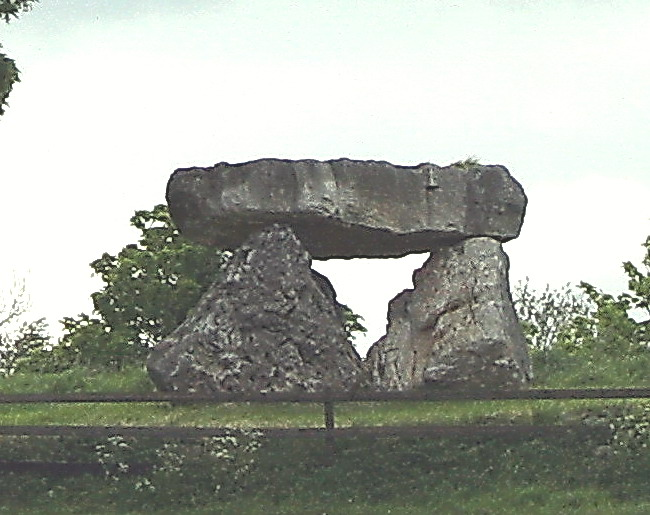
Replica Megalith in Cadamstown

== See also ==
- List of towns and villages in Ireland
