= Bangor Trail =

Hiking trail in Ireland

Coordinates: 54°8′24.6″N 9°44′9.3″W

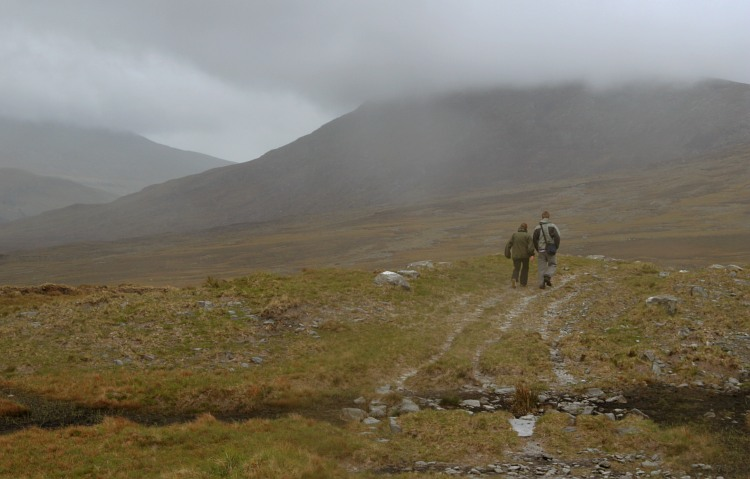
- Above: Hikers walking along the trail, the Nephin Beg range is visible in the background Below: Map of the 26km offroad section between Bangor Erris and Letterkeen
- Length: 39km
- Location: Erris, Mayo, Ireland
- Trailheads: Bangor Erris, Letterkeen, Newport
- Use: Hiking
- Difficulty: Very difficult
- Surface: Rough, wet

The Bangor Trail is a waymarked walking trail in Erris, North Mayo, Ireland. The trail, which is approximately 40km in length, takes a route south from Bangor Erris through the Nephin Beg Range to Newport. The trail, however, can be shortened to 26km by starting or finishing at Letterkeen trailhead, where there is a car park and a shuttle bus stop during the summer months.

It is a relatively remote hiking trail, passing through the Nephin Beg mountain range and the Owenduff blanket bog, the largest intact blanket bog in western Europe. The trail follows an old drover path, which was possibly in use since the Iron Age, and was previously the main route between Erris and Newport going back to the 16th century. There is evidence of previous human inhabitation along the route, much of which dates back to the mid 19th century before the Great Famine, when the population of the area was much higher. Most of the trail lies within Wild Nephin National Park, and the habitat along the route supports Irish hares, frogs, red grouse as well as other birds and summer wildflowers.
