= Sport Ireland =

Statutory body overseeing and part-funding sport development in Ireland

- Sport: Development of Sport in the Republic of Ireland
- Founded: 1999
- Chairman: John Foley

Official website
- www.sportireland.ie
- (Republic of Ireland)

Sport Ireland (Irish: Spórt Éireann), formerly the Irish Sports Council, is a statutory authority that oversees, and partly funds, the development of sport within the Republic of Ireland. It is located at the National Sports Campus in the townland of Sheephill near Abbotstown House in Dublin.

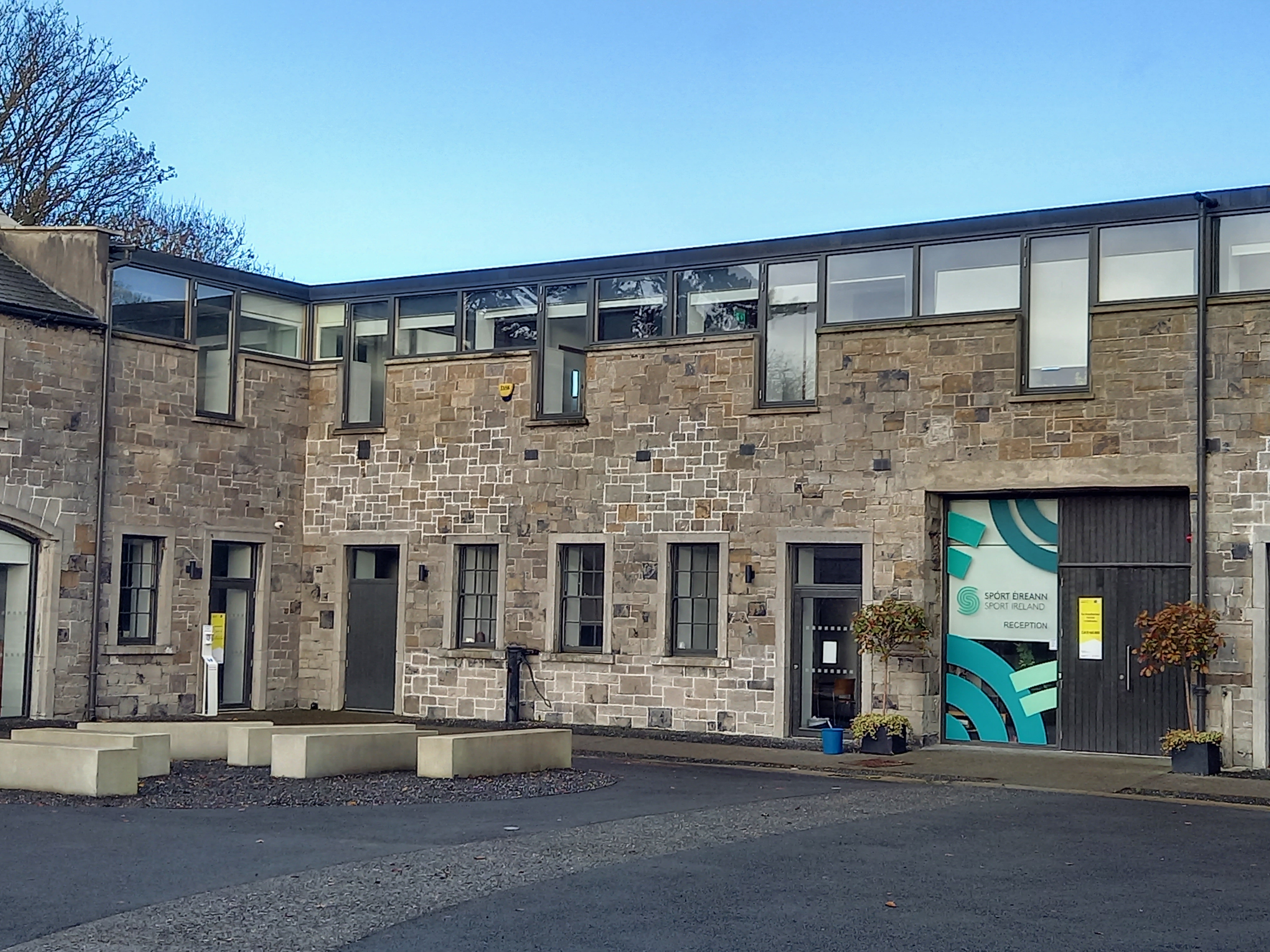
Sport Ireland's offices in the courtyard of Abbotstown House

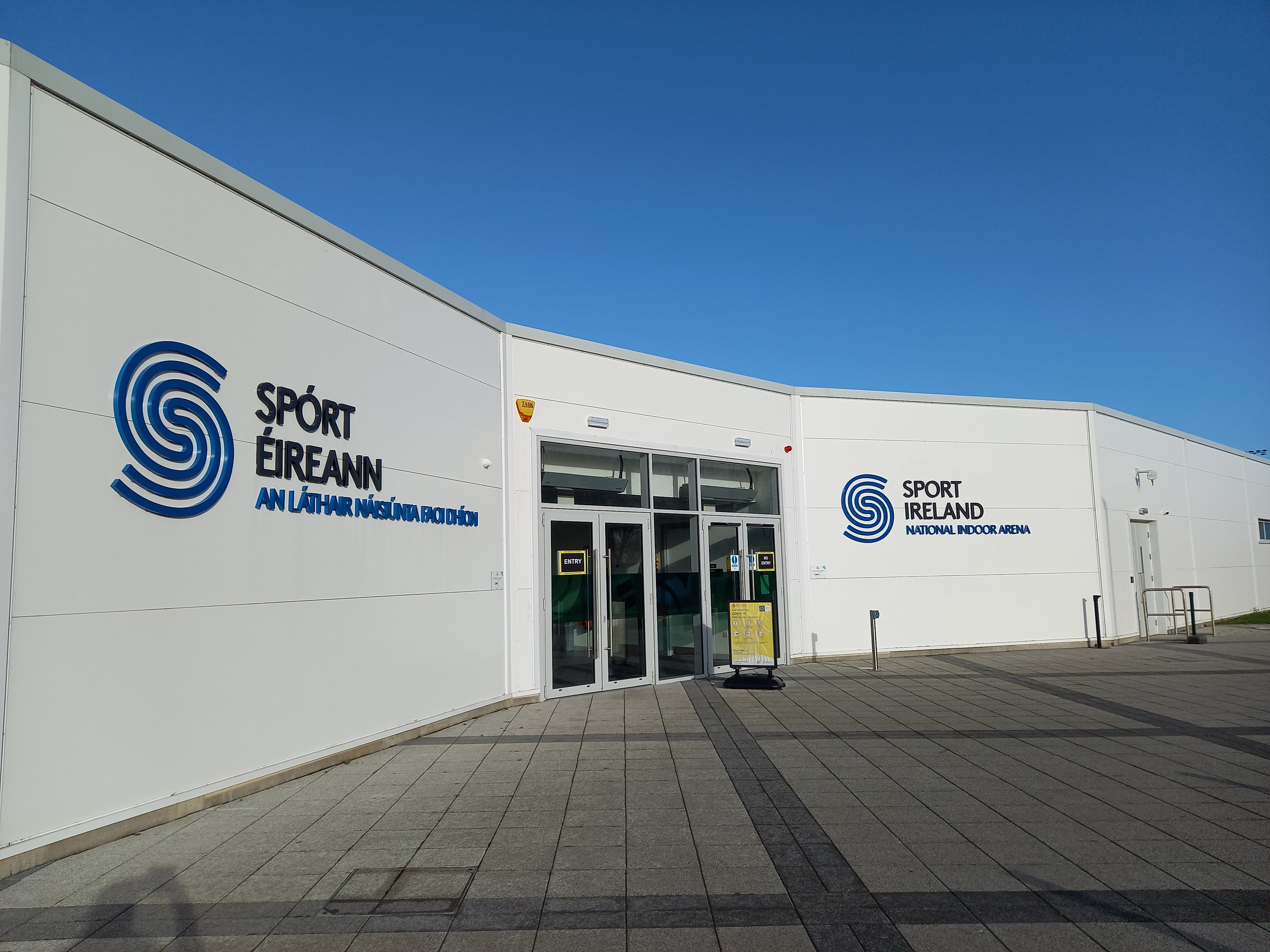
Sport Ireland's National Indoor Arena reception

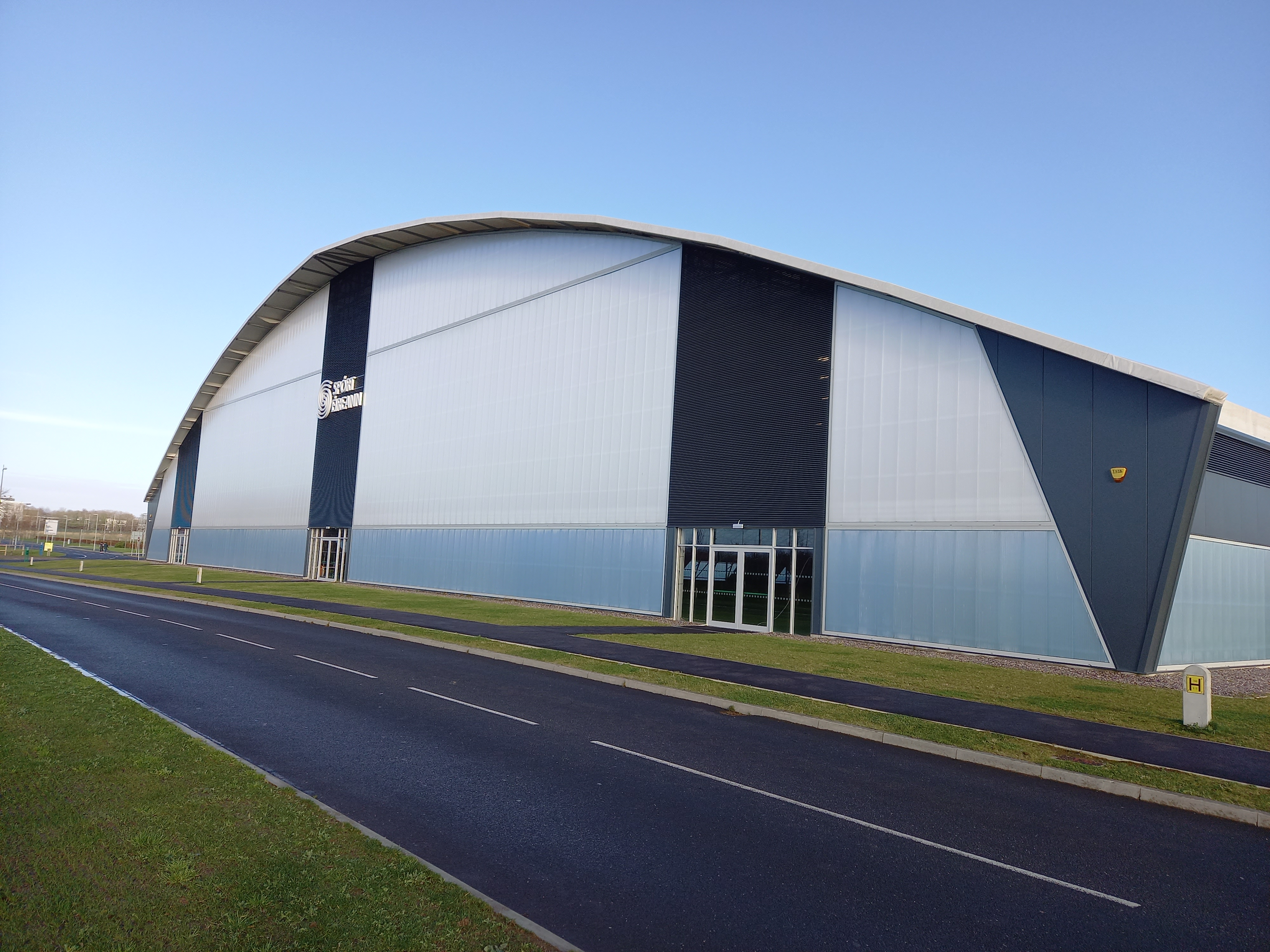
Sport Ireland's National Indoor Arena at Sheephill townland

Sport Ireland was established in July 1999 under powers provided by the Irish Sports Council Act. Its remit is to plan, lead and co-ordinate the sustainable development of competitive and recreational sport in Ireland.

Sport Ireland comprises eight major divisions including: Finance, High Performance, Local Sports Partnerships, National Governing Bodies, the Anti-Doping Unit, Corporate Services, the National Trails Office, and the Irish Institute of Sport.

Sport Ireland is member of the European Platform for Sport Innovation.

== See also ==
- Olympic Federation of Ireland
- State agencies of the Republic of Ireland
