= Saint Kevin's Way =

Pilgrim path in County Wicklow, Ireland

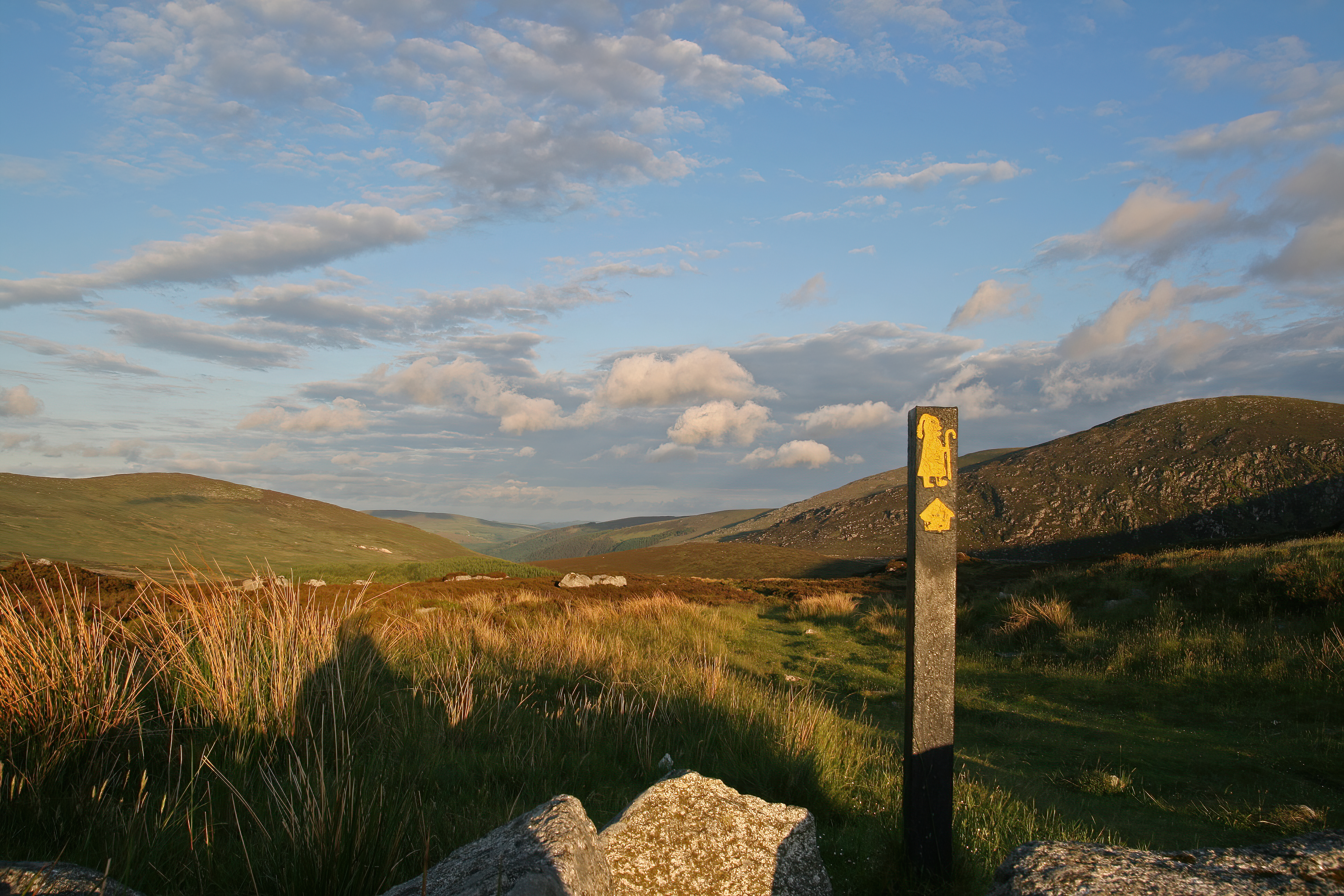
- Saint Kevin's Way waymarker, Wicklow Gap
- Length: 30 kilometres (19 miles)
- Location: County Wicklow, Ireland
- Designation: Pilgrim Path
- Trailheads: Hollywood; Valleymount; Glendalough
- Use: Hiking
- Elevation gain/loss: 580 m (1,903 ft)
- Difficulty: Moderate
- Season: Any
- Surface: Roads, forest paths and tracks

Saint Kevin's Way

The Saint Kevin's Way (Irish: Slí Chaoimhín) is a pilgrim path in County Wicklow, Ireland. It is 30 kilometres (19 miles) long and begins in the village of Hollywood, crosses the Wicklow Gap, and ends at the remains of the medieval monastery in Glendalough. An alternative spur route begins at Valleymount and joins the main trail at Ballinagee Bridge. It is typically completed in one day.

The trail follows in the footsteps of Caoimhín Naofa who crossed the Wicklow Mountains and founded the monastery at Glendalough in the 6th century. The journey later became a route of pilgrimage for visitors to Glendalough. It is one of a series of medieval pilgrim paths developed as walking trails by the Heritage Council.

In 2016 Saint Kevin's Way became part of the new National Pilgrim Passport for Ireland. The new passport offers an opportunity to walk 125 km of Ireland’s medieval pilgrim paths, with stamping points at the conclusion of each participating path. On completion of all five paths, participants are entitled to an Irish Pilgrim Paths completion certificate (Teastas Oilithreachta) from Ballintubber Abbey, Co Mayo. The four routes currently in the Pilgrim Passport along with St Kevin’s Way are: Tochar Phádraig, Mayo; Cosán na Naomh, Kerry; Cnoc na dTobar, Kerry; St. Finbarr's Pilgrim Path, Cork.

== See also ==
- The Art O'Neill Challenge, an ultramarathon event, which happens once a year in January and crosses the Saint Kevin's Way route near Ballinagee Bridge
- Pilgrim Paths of Ireland
- Lists of long-distance trails in the Republic of Ireland
