= Reek Sunday =

Annual day of pilgrimage in Ireland

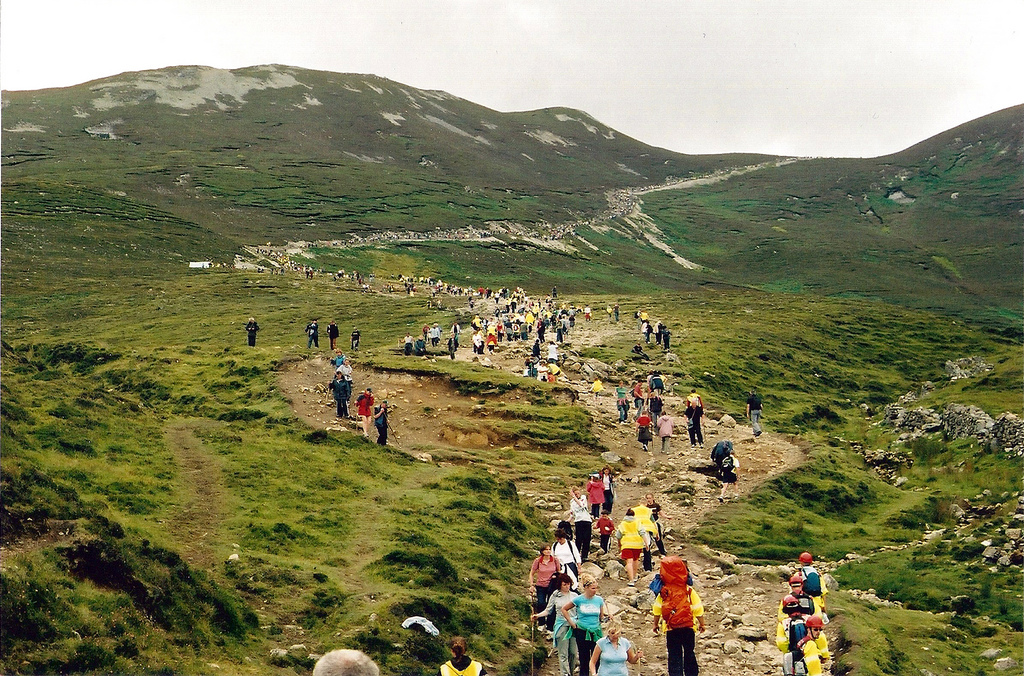
Pilgrims climbing Croagh Patrick on Reek Sunday

Reek Sunday (Irish: Domhnach na Cruaiche), Garland Sunday or Crom Dubh Sunday (Irish: Domhnach Crom Dubh) is an annual day of pilgrimage in Ireland.

On the last Sunday in July, thousands of pilgrims climb Ireland's holiest mountain, Croagh Patrick (764 metres) in County Mayo. It is held in honour of Saint Patrick who is said to have spent forty days fasting on the mountain in the 5th century. Masses are held at the summit, where there is a small chapel. Some climb the mountain barefoot, as an act of penance, and some carry out 'rounding rituals', which were formerly a key part of the pilgrimage. This involves praying while walking sunwise around features on the mountain: seven times around the cairn of Leacht Benáin (Benan's grave), fifteen times around the circular perimeter of the summit, seven times around Leaba Phádraig (Patrick's bed), and then seven times around three ancient burial cairns known as Reilig Mhuire (Mary's cemetery). Until 1970, it was traditional for pilgrims to climb the mountain after sunset.

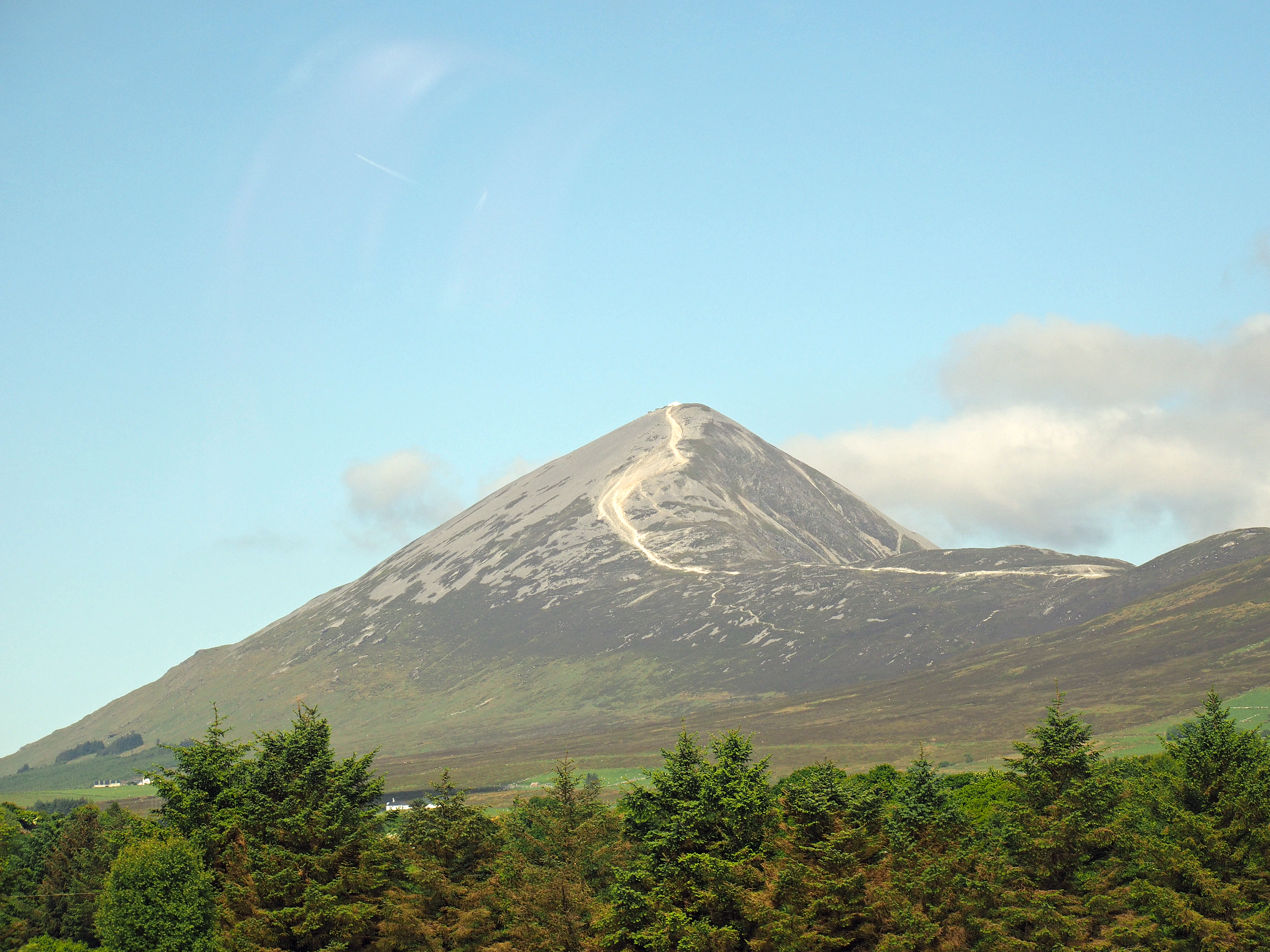
Croagh Patrick

The pilgrimage has been held yearly for at least 1,500 years. It is likely that it pre-dates Christianity and was originally a ritual associated with the festival of Lughnasadh.

The earliest surviving mention of a pilgrimage at Croagh Patrick is from the year 1113, when the Annals of Ulster record that "a ball of fire came on the night of the feast of Patrick on Cruacháin Aighle [Croagh Patrick] and destroyed thirty of those fasting". Historically, pilgrimages were made to the mountaintop on Saint Patrick's Day, the Feast of the Assumption, and the last Friday in July (Crom Dubh's Friday).

Today, most pilgrims climb Croagh Patrick from the direction of Murrisk Abbey to the north. Originally, most pilgrims climbed the mountain from the east, following the Togher Patrick (Tochár Phádraig) pilgrim path from Ballintubber Abbey. This route is dotted with prehistoric monuments. The Tochár Phádraig may have originally been the main route to the mountain from Cruachan, seat of the Kings of Connacht. The Tochar Phadraig was revived and reopened by Pilgrim Paths of Ireland.

Between 15,000 and 30,000 pilgrims participate, compared to a yearly climbing total of more than 100,000. The Archbishop of Tuam leads the climb each year. Up to 300 personnel from eleven mountain rescue teams from across Ireland are involved, including the local Mayo Mountain Rescue Team, for whom it is the busiest day of the year. Also involved is the Air Corps, Irish Cave Rescue Organisation (ICRO), the Order of Malta, Civil Defence Ireland and members of the Garda Síochána. Injuries ranging from cuts and broken bones to hypothermia and cardiac arrest occur each year. The climb takes two hours, on average, and one and a half hours to descend.

== Annual climbs ==
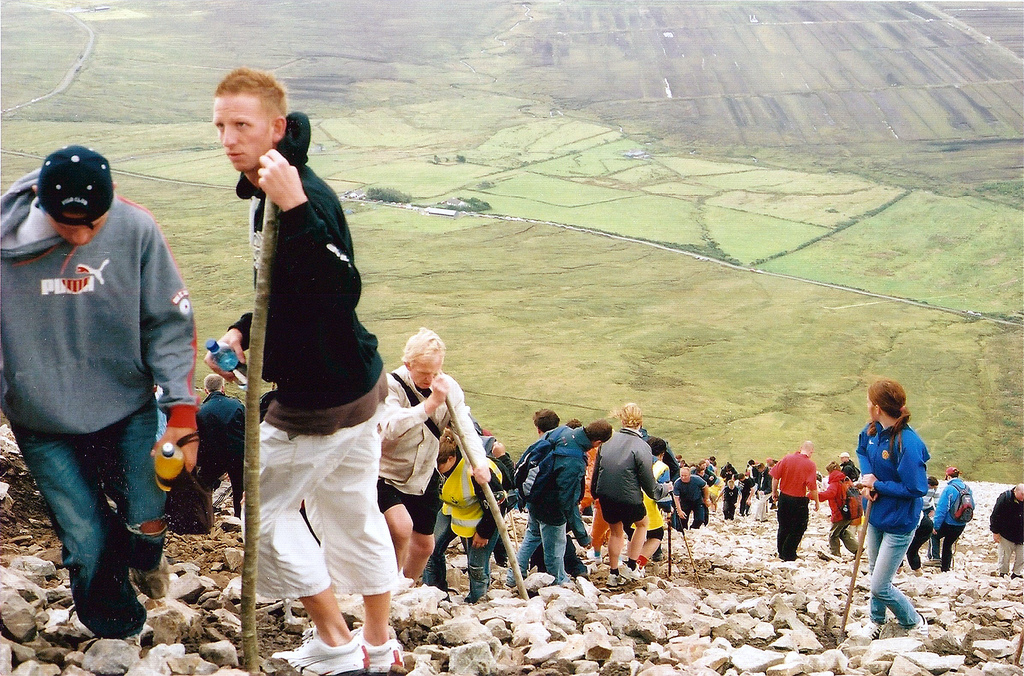
Groups of people climbing Croagh Patrick on Reek Sunday

=== 1999 ===
In 1999, 25,000 pilgrims took part in the climb in ideal conditions. Archbishop Michael Neary of Tuam spoke on the mountain of the improving quality of life which Ireland was experiencing in the late 1990s.

=== 2002 ===
Michael Neary spoke of the fear created by banking and commerce as well as by the Church and state at a meeting with pilgrims in Westport prior to the 2002 climb. Pilgrims came from Australia, Europe, the United Kingdom, and the United States. Rain created difficult climbing conditions on the day.

=== 2006 ===
Around 20,000 people took part in 2006 during particularly bad weather of wind and rain. Archbishops Seán Brady and Michael Neary said Mass on top, with Neary appealing for kindness and goodwill to be shown to immigrant families. Twenty-three people were airlifted or stretchered off the mountain with illnesses and injuries; two of these were hospitalised. The first analytic survey was conducted when 11,000 pilgrims were interviewed. Two-thirds of them were men, one-third were women, five percent came from outside Ireland, and two percent climbed in their bare feet.

=== 2007 ===
Over 30,000 pilgrims climbed Croagh Patrick on Reek Sunday in 2007. There were some minor foot injuries, whilst one man had a suspected cardiac arrest on the mountain.

=== 2008 ===
Over 25,000 pilgrims took part in 2008. The Mass on the summit, celebrated by Michael Neary, was broadcast live worldwide for the first time by RTÉ. He spoke of consumer values that he felt were seducing society. Over 20 priests were involved in the event. Injuries were very few.

=== 2009 ===
Only 18,000 pilgrims climbed the mountain in 2009. Weather conditions were particularly bad with many choosing to climb the mountain the previous day. Between five and six children contracted hypothermia. Some participants sustained minor cuts, others complained of coronary problems, whilst one woman was airlifted off the mountain after breaking her ankle the day before, and a man was airlifted to hospital after having a suspected cardiac arrest on the mountain. Prior to the climb, Mayo Mountain Rescue Team advised pilgrims to carry some sort of footwear but not flip-flops, sandals, stiletto heels or wellingtons; it was the first time they had issued such advice. Pilgrims were also told to use a stick for walking, wear multiple layers of clothing and to scale the mountain at a slow pace. Archbishop Michael Neary said before the 2009 climb that people were "searching desperately" for hope in the "menacing desert" of the recession. In his homily on the mountain, Neary talked of the effects the recession had on family life.

=== 2010 ===
Michael Neary led the 2010 National Pilgrimage to Croagh Patrick involving about 20,000 people. The Mayo Mountain Rescue Team, which responds to about 50 emergency calls to the mountain annually, called for safety maintenance work to be carried out in an area where the increased number of climbers, all year round, has caused significant erosion.

=== 2013 ===
The climb on 28 July 2013 took place in sunny weather and was undertaken by between 15,000 and 20,000 people. Ash and blackthorn sticks were for sale at €3 each, or for rent at €1.50. Drought conditions during July made it unusually dry underfoot on the day of the climb. Nearly 300 volunteers with Mayo Mountain Rescue, the Irish Cave Rescue Organisation, the Order of Malta Ambulance Corps, Civil Defence Ireland, and an Air Corps helicopter were in attendance and on standby. There were 17 reported injuries, including two which required airlifts. A woman who suffered a head injury on the peak was treated by Mayo Mountain Rescue and a 67-year-old tourist who suffered suspected cardiac problems mid-descent was treated by Order of Malta Ambulance Rescue and First aid teams, before being winched into a helicopter by Irish Air Corps and transported to hospital. The weather for the day was very good, with winds being very mild in comparison to other years.

=== 2015 ===
The climb on 26 July 2015 was cancelled. Met Éireann issued a yellow weather alert for the day until 3 pm forecasting heavy rain. Some people went on the walk anyway, and some were treated for hypothermia.

=== 2016 ===
Twenty to twenty five thousand people participated in the 2016 Reek Sunday pilgrimage, which was led by the Archbishop of Tuam, Dr Michael Neary, with the Papal Nuncio, Archbishop Charles John Brown. Volunteers from all twelve Irish mountain rescue teams, including 120 members of the Order of Malta, were present as part of a safety plan coordinated by members of the Mayo Mountain Rescue team. A detachment from the Air Corps was on duty with a helicopter to rescue any casualties from the mountain.

=== 2017 ===
At least 25,000 people took part in the 2017 Reek Sunday pilgrimage, including the Archbishop of Tuam, Michael Neary, and Fintan Monahan, Bishop of Killaloe. Thirteen people were injured, three of whom were airlifted off the mountain.

=== 2018 ===
Five thousand people were thought to have taken part in 2018.

=== 2019 ===
"Thousands" of people were estimated to have gone on the 2019 pilgrimage, but the number was thought to be lower than in earlier years.

== Pilgrimages across Ireland ==
The annual pilgrimage to Croagh Patrick parallels numerous smaller local pilgrimages across the Island of Ireland on the last Sunday of July. These pilgrimages typically involve the climbing of a local mountain, visitation to a local Holy Well, or both. The status of these pilgrimages varies across the country, with some having been continuously practiced, some having ceased, and some being revived.

In Keash, County Sligo, during the early 20th century Garland Sunday procedures involved the visiting of the local holy well, King Cormac's Well, before ascending Keash Hill, the local hill which houses the Caves of Kesh. This was followed by sports and the picking of bilberries. This pilgrimage is still performed however overtime practice has shifted. In the pilgrimage done today the Holy Well visited before climbing Keash Hill is now Tobernalt Holy Well.

The Máméan pass on Binn Chaonaigh, County Galway was also climbed on this day. The practice ended in the 19th century but was revived in 1979 and occurs annually.

Until the 19th century Slieve Donard in County Down was climbed on the last Sunday of July. The earliest known date of such a pilgrimage was dated to 1645, though the practice is believed to extend even further into the past.

Slievecallan in County Clare was once visited on the last Sunday of July, known locally as Domhnach Crom Dubh. On the top of the mountain there is a lawn called Buaile na Gréine On this lawn is supposed to have stood Altóir na Gréine. Local legends say on this altar sacrifices were supposedly offered to Pagan Gods and that the practice was then Christianised.

Drung Hill, County Kerry was, until 1880, visited on Garland Sunday. This was a day of public celebration, with a cattle fair held by the hill and singing, dancing and games played at the summit followed by an evening meal. The practice of baking a cake to be cut buy the best dancers in the celebration or by an engaged couple was a distinct characteristic of this event. The Holy Well at the peak of the mountain is also believed to have had ritual significance on this date. This festival has been connected to Lughnasa.

Similar practices can be found in Knocknadobar, County Kerry, where on the last Sunday of July, festivities such as games and singing took place at the base of the mountain. The pilgrimage to the peak briefly ceased but was revived in 1885.

Pilgrimages were made to other locations at this time of year, such as to the peaks of Mount Brandon, and Church Mountain and to a Holy Well in Ballyfa, County Galway.
