= Pilgrim Paths of Ireland =

Non-denominational representative body for Ireland's pilgrim paths

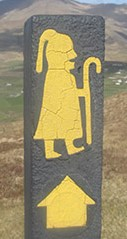
Trail marker of Pilgrim Paths Ireland

Pilgrim Paths Ireland (PPI) is a non-denominational representative body for Ireland's medieval pilgrim paths. PPI was founded in 2013 to oversee the development and promotion of Ireland's medieval pilgrimage paths, and consists of 12 community groups supporting specific paths. PPI holds an annual National Pilgrimage Paths Week during Easter, and issues a National Pilgrimage Passport to finishers of the 5 main trails: Cnoc na dTobar, Cosán na Naomh, St. Finbarr's Pilgrim Path, St. Kevin’s Way, and Tochar Phádraig.

== Background ==
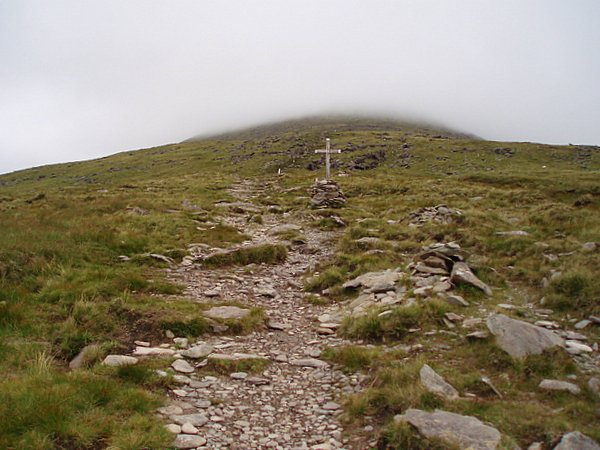
Cosán na Naomh at 500 metres

In 1997, a Pilgrim Paths Project was started by the Irish Heritage Council focused on seven medieval routes of pilgrimage.

In 2013, Pilgrim Paths Ireland (PPI) was founded at a meeting in Nenagh "as an umbrella body for the volunteer groups promoting Ireland’s penitential trails".

Irish hillwalking guidebook author and journalist John G O'Dwyer, was elected Chairman and highlighted the "spiritual tourism" potential for Ireland.

On 19 April 2014, Ireland's first National Pilgrim Paths Day was held on various penitential trails across the country, attracting over 1,700 participants. On 4 April 2015, a second National Pilgrim Paths Day was held attracting over 3,000 participants. In 2016, the event was expanded to a National Pilgrim Paths Week to be held over the Easter festival; the following have been held:

- 2016 National Pilgrim Paths Week (22–29 March 2016).
- 2017 National Pilgrim Paths Week (11–17 April 2017).
- 2018 National Pilgrim Paths Week (31 March – 8 April 2018).
- 2019 National Pilgrim Paths Week (19–28 April 2019).

National Pilgrim Paths Week 2020, which was scheduled to take place from April 9 to 19, was cancelled due to the COVID-19 pandemic in Ireland.

As of June 2020, PPI represents 12 community groups associated with Ireland's main penitential paths and is considered the national representative body.

== Pilgrim Passport ==
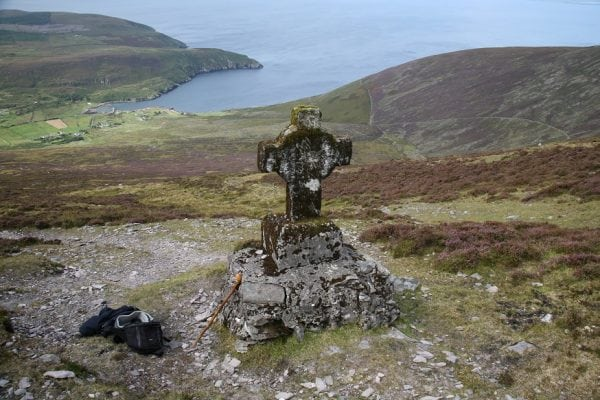
Station of the cross, Knocknadobar

During the Easter 2016 National Pilgrim Paths festival week, the PPI launched the National Pilgrim Passport.

At the launch, the Irish Independent described it as the Celtic Camino, and a "pedestrian version of the Wild Atlantic Way".

The passport covers 124 km of Ireland's most important medieval pilgrim paths, with stamping points arranged at the conclusion of each path so that walkers can "earn" their completed passport, in a similar manner to the Camino de Santiago pilgrimage trails in Spain. On completion of all five paths, participants can apply for a Pilgrim Certificate (Irish: Teastas Oilithreachta), from Ballintubber Abbey (which is at the start of the Tochar Phádraig pilgrimage route).

As of June 2019, the five routes included on the Pilgrim Passport are:

| Name | County | Format | Start | End | Length | Time | Difficulty |
|---|---|---|---|---|---|---|---|
| Cnoc na dTobar | Kerry | Linear; Mountain | St. Fursey's Holy Well | Knocknadobar mountain | 9.5 km (5.9 mi) | 3.5 hours | Moderate |
| Cosán na Naomh | Kerry | Linear; Mountain | Ventry Strand | Brandon mountain | 18 km (11 mi) | 4–5 hours | Moderate |
| St. Finbarr's Pilgrim Path | Cork | Linear | Drimoleague | Gougane Barra | 37 km (23 mi) | 2 days | Strenuous |
| Saint Kevin's Way | Wicklow | Linear | Hollywood or Valleymount | Glendalough | 30 km (19 mi) | 7 hours | Moderate |
| Tochar Phádraig | Mayo | Linear; Mountain | Ballintubber Abbey | Croagh Patrick mountain | 30 km (19 mi) | 10 hours | Moderate |

14 people were registered as finishers (Irish: Críochnóirí) of the five above walks in 2016, 30 were registered in 2017, and 44 were registered in 2018.

On, 15 January 2017, Irish ultramarathon runner Susan Steele, became the first person to run all 5 paths of the Irish Pilgrim Journey, over a period of 5 consecutive days.

== Members ==
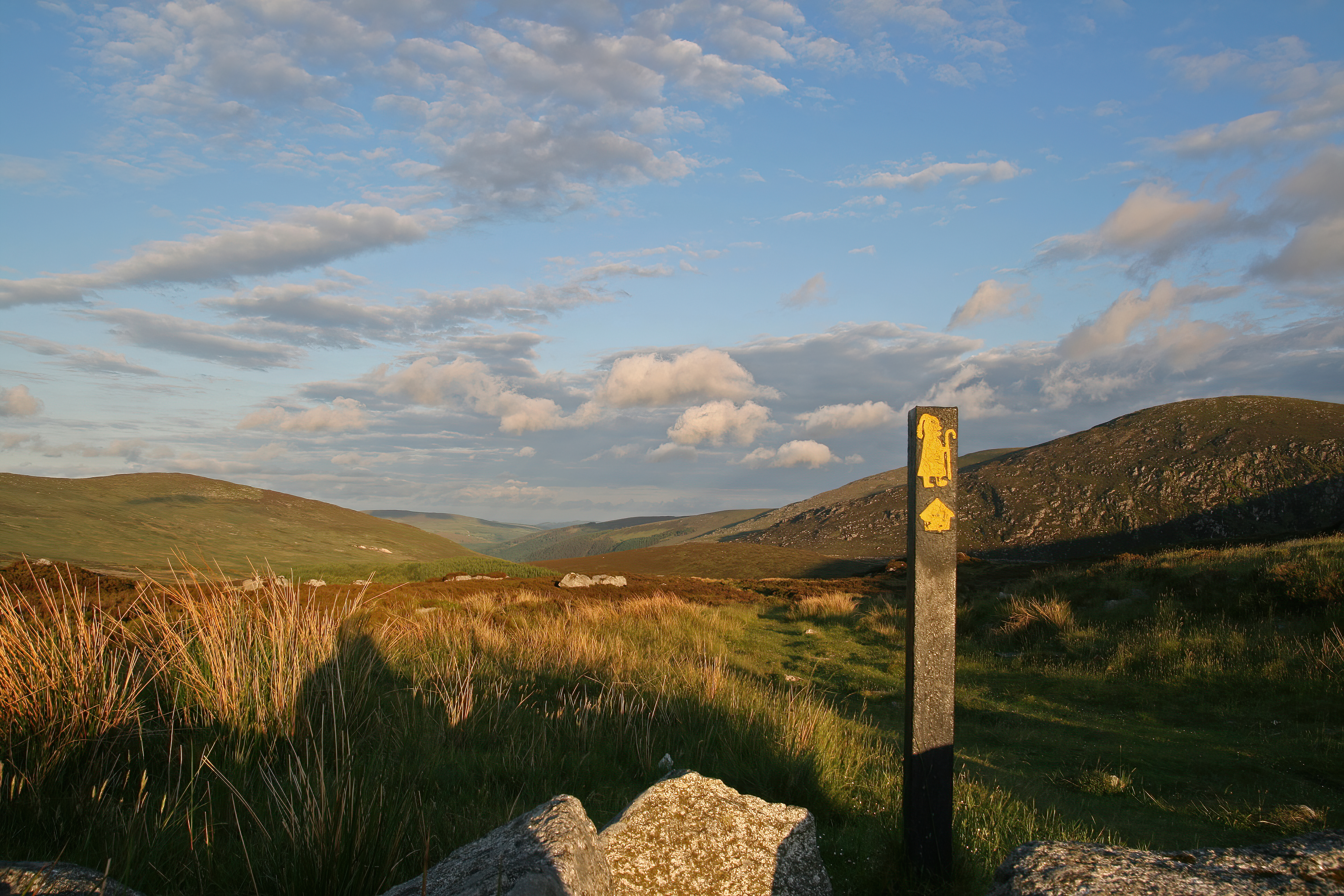
Saint Kevin's Way, Wicklow Gap.

Local penitential path organisations who are members of Pilgrim Paths Ireland are:

1. Cnoc na dTobar, Kerry (at Knocknadobar mountain)
2. Cosán na Naomh, Kerry (Ventry Strand to Mount Brandon mountain)
3. Kilcommon Pilgrim Loop, Tipperary
4. Lough Derg, Donegal (St. Patrick's Purgatory)
5. Rath/Dysert Pilgrim Path, Clare
6. Sli Mor Pilgrim's Path, Offaly (Ballycumber to Clonmacnoise)
7. St. Brigid's Way, Louth/Kildare (Faughart to Kildare)
8. St. Declan's Way, Waterford/Tipperary (Declán of Ardmore)
9. St. Finbarr's Pilgrim Path, Cork (Drimoleague to Gougane Barra)
10. St. Kevin's Way, Wicklow (Hollywood to Glendalough)
11. Tochar Phádraig, Mayo (Ballintubber Abbey to Croagh Patrick mountain)
12. Turas Cholmcille, Donegal

== Books ==
- John G. O'Dwyer (August 2017). Pilgrim Paths in Ireland: A Guide: From Slieve Mish to Skellig Michael. Collins Press. ISBN 978-1848893153.
- Darach MacDonald; Brian D'Arcy (May 2013). Tochar: Walking Ireland's ancient pilgrim paths. New Island. ISBN 978-1848402478.

== See also ==
- Lists of mountains in Ireland
- Lists of long-distance trails in the Republic of Ireland
- Camino de Santiago
