= Drung =

Drung may refer to:

- Derung people, an ethnic group of China
- Derung language, spoken by the Derung people of China
- Drung Hill, a hill in County Kerry, Ireland
- Drung, County Cavan, a civil parish in Ireland
