= Ballintubber =

Village in County Mayo, Ireland

Ballintober Baile an Tobair
- Village
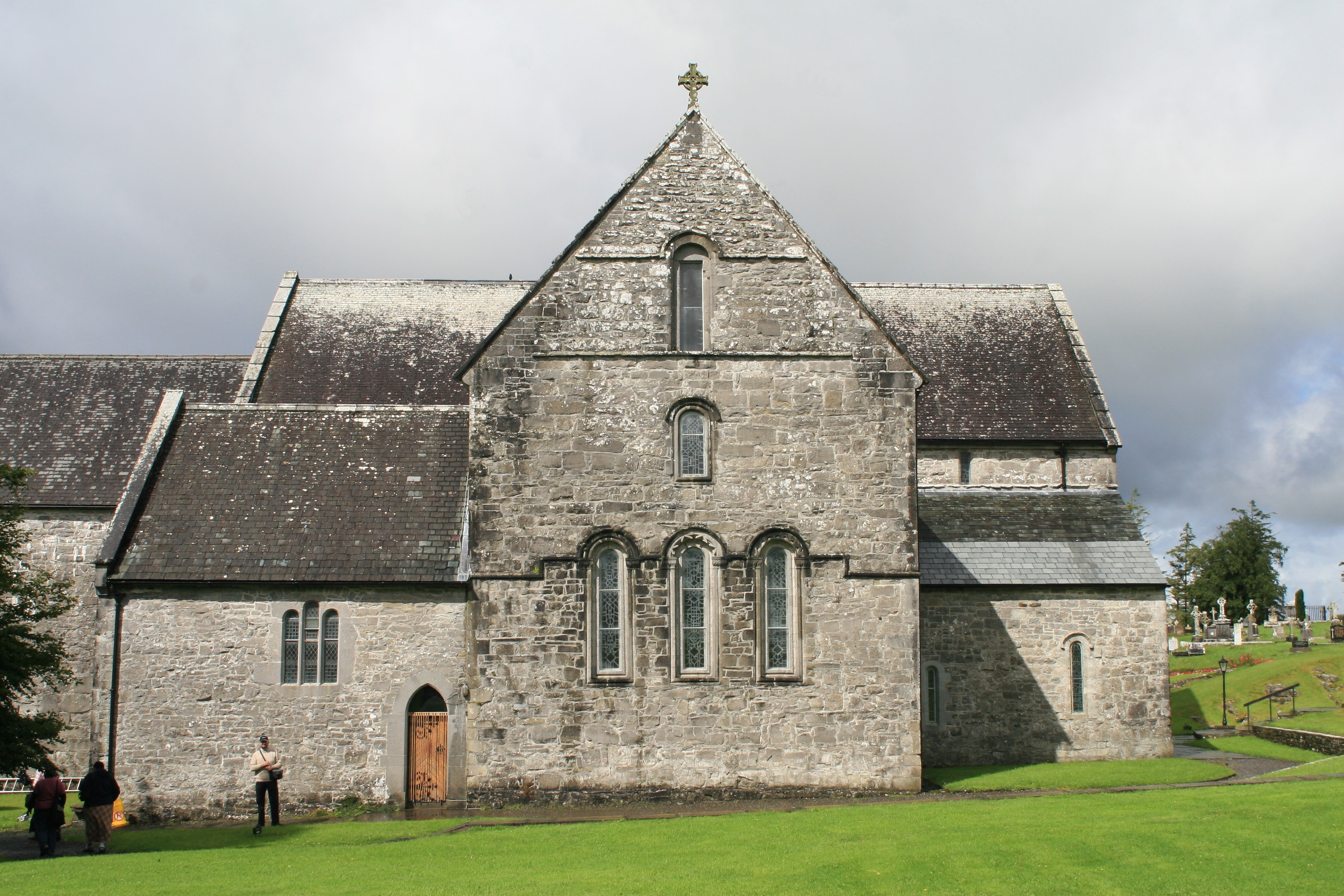
- Ballintober Abbey

- Location in Ireland
- Coordinates: 53°44′42″N 9°17′54″W
- Country: Ireland
- Province: Connacht
- County: County Mayo
- Elevation: 64 m (210 ft)
- Time zone: UTC+0 (WET)
  - Summer (DST): UTC-1 (IST (WEST))
- Irish Grid Reference: M142767

Ballintubber, officially Ballintober (Irish: Baile an Tobair, meaning 'settlement of the well'), is a village in County Mayo, Ireland, known for Ballintubber Abbey which was founded in 1216. The countryside of Ballintubber is set against the backdrop of the Partry Mountains.

== History ==
The long history of Ballintubber dates back to pre-Christian times, when people came from the east, through Ballintubber, on the way to a druidic site now called Croagh Patrick. When Saint Patrick brought Christianity to the west of Ireland after 461 A.D., he founded a church at Ballintubber. The present Ballintubber Abbey was founded in 1216 by Cathal Crobhdearg, Chief of the Name of Clan O'Conor and King of Connacht. Church records for Ballintubber and Burriscarra parish commenced in 1839 and are held at the South Mayo Family Research Centre in Ballinrobe.

== Notable people ==
- Alan Dillon, politician
- Cillian O'Connor, footballer
- Diarmuid O'Connor, footballer
- Seán na Sagart, priest hunter
- Joseph McNally, De La Salle Brother

== See also ==
- List of towns and villages in Ireland
