= William R. D. Blackwood =

Irish soldier who fought in the American Civil War

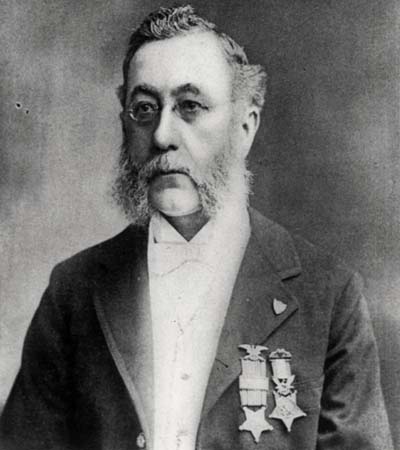
- Born: May 12, 1838; Hollywood, Ireland
- Died: April 22, 1922 (aged 83); Philadelphia, Pennsylvania
- Burial place: Chelten Hills Cemetery, Philadelphia
- Military career
- Allegiance: United States of America
- Branch: United States Army
- Service years: 1862–1865
- Rank: Brevet Lieutenant Colonel
- Unit: 48th Regiment Pennsylvania Volunteer Infantry
- Conflicts: Third Battle of Petersburg
- Awards: Medal of Honor

Surgeon William Robert Douglas Blackwood (May 12, 1838 – April 26, 1922) was an Irish soldier who fought in the American Civil War. Blackwood received the United States' highest award for bravery during combat, the Medal of Honor, for his action during the Third Battle of Petersburg in Virginia on April 2, 1865. He was honored with the award on July 21, 1897.

== Biography ==
Blackwood was born in Hollywood, Ireland on May 12, 1838. He immigrated to the United States and studied medicine at the University of Pennsylvania Medical School in June 1859, completed his course work in 1861, wrote his thesis on gastro-intestinal digestion, and graduated in 1862. In September 1862 he enlisted into the 149th Pennsylvania Infantry as an assistant surgeon but was later transferred to the 48th Pennsylvania Infantry on April 28, 1863, where he was promoted to chief surgeon of the regiment.

During the Third Battle of Petersburg when Fort Mahone was being attacked, Blackwood assisted several seriously wounded soldiers from the battlefield. He was awarded the Medal of Honor for his heroics. He died in Philadelphia on April 26, 1922, and his remains are interred at the Chelten Hills Cemetery, Philadelphia.

== Medal of Honor citation ==
Removed severely wounded officers and soldiers from the field while under a heavy fire from the enemy, exposing himself beyond the call of duty, thus furnishing an example of most distinguished gallantry.

== Family ==
William Robert Douglas Blackwood was born in Hollywood, Ireland on May 12, 1838, to Robert Blackwood and Victoria Douglas.

Dr. Blackwood married Ida Chote Gerhart in 1874, and had four children.

== See also ==
- List of American Civil War Medal of Honor recipients: A–F
