= Tobernalt =

Holy well in County Sligo, Ireland

Coordinates: 54.2439°N 8.4456°W

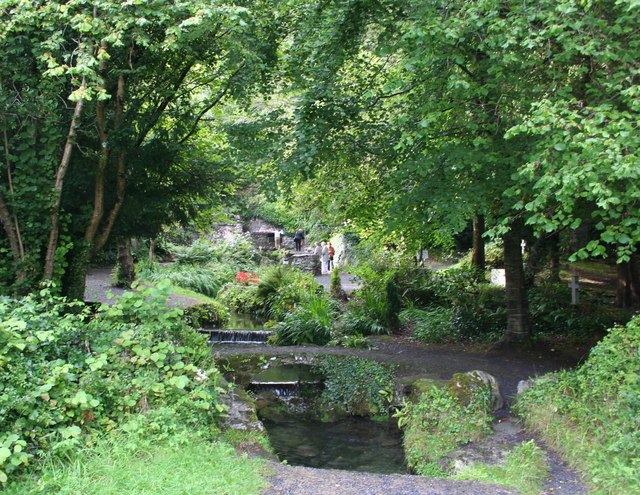
Holywell near Tobernalt Bay

Tobernalt (Irish: Tobar an Aillt, meaning 'well of the cliff') is a holy well in north County Sligo, Ireland near the southwest corner of Lough Gill. It is an ancient natural spring dating back to the 5th century as a pagan meeting place and later a Penal Law mass site.

As of 2016 it is maintained by St John's Parish, Carraroe, Sligo. Masses are conducted at the site. The devoted from surrounding counties and elsewhere make pilgrimages to the site on Garland Sunday when a day-long schedule of devotions is held.

Near the well there is a reputed "healing stone" associated with St. Patrick. Patrick's fingerprints are said to be on the stone.
