= Boheh Stone =

Neolithic rock art in County Mayo, Ireland

- Cathaoir Phádraig (Irish)
- St. Patrick's Chair
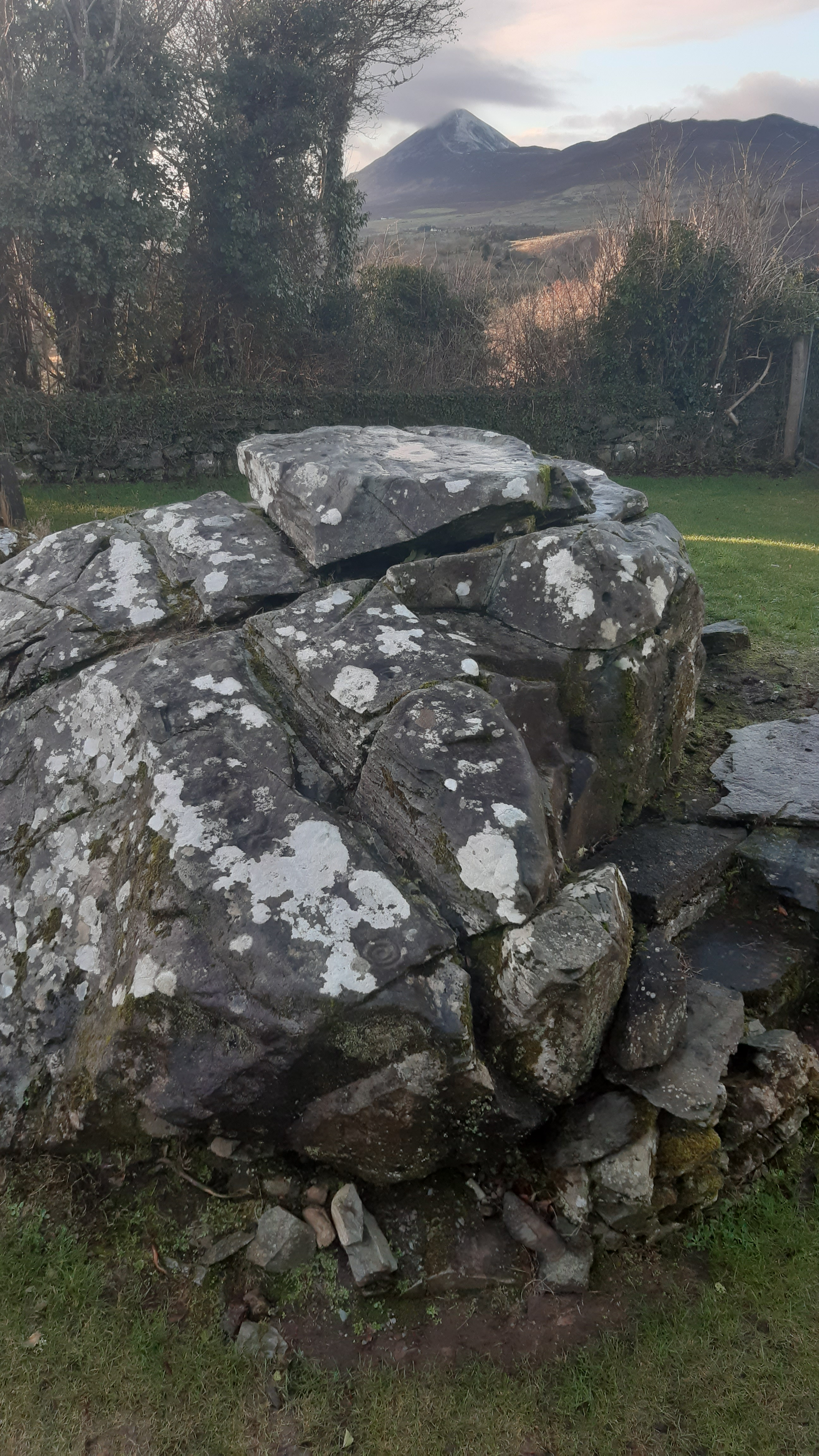
- The rock with the peak of Croagh Patrick mountain in the background

- Location within Ireland
- 53.747672°N 9.553979°W
- Type: Rock art
- Location: Boheh, Aughagower, County Mayo, Ireland

History
- Built: 3800–2000 BC

Site notes
- Elevation: 102 m (335 ft)
- Height: 2 m (6 ft 7 in)
- Area: 4 m^{2} (43 sq ft)
- Owner: Mayo County Council

National monument of Ireland
- Official name: Boheh Rock Art
- Reference no.: 296

The Boheh Stone, also called St. Patrick's Chair, is a piece of rock art and a National Monument located in County Mayo, Ireland.

== Location ==
The Boheh Stone lies 6.4 km (4 mi) SSW of Westport.

== History ==
The stone is believed to have been carved as early as 3800 BC.

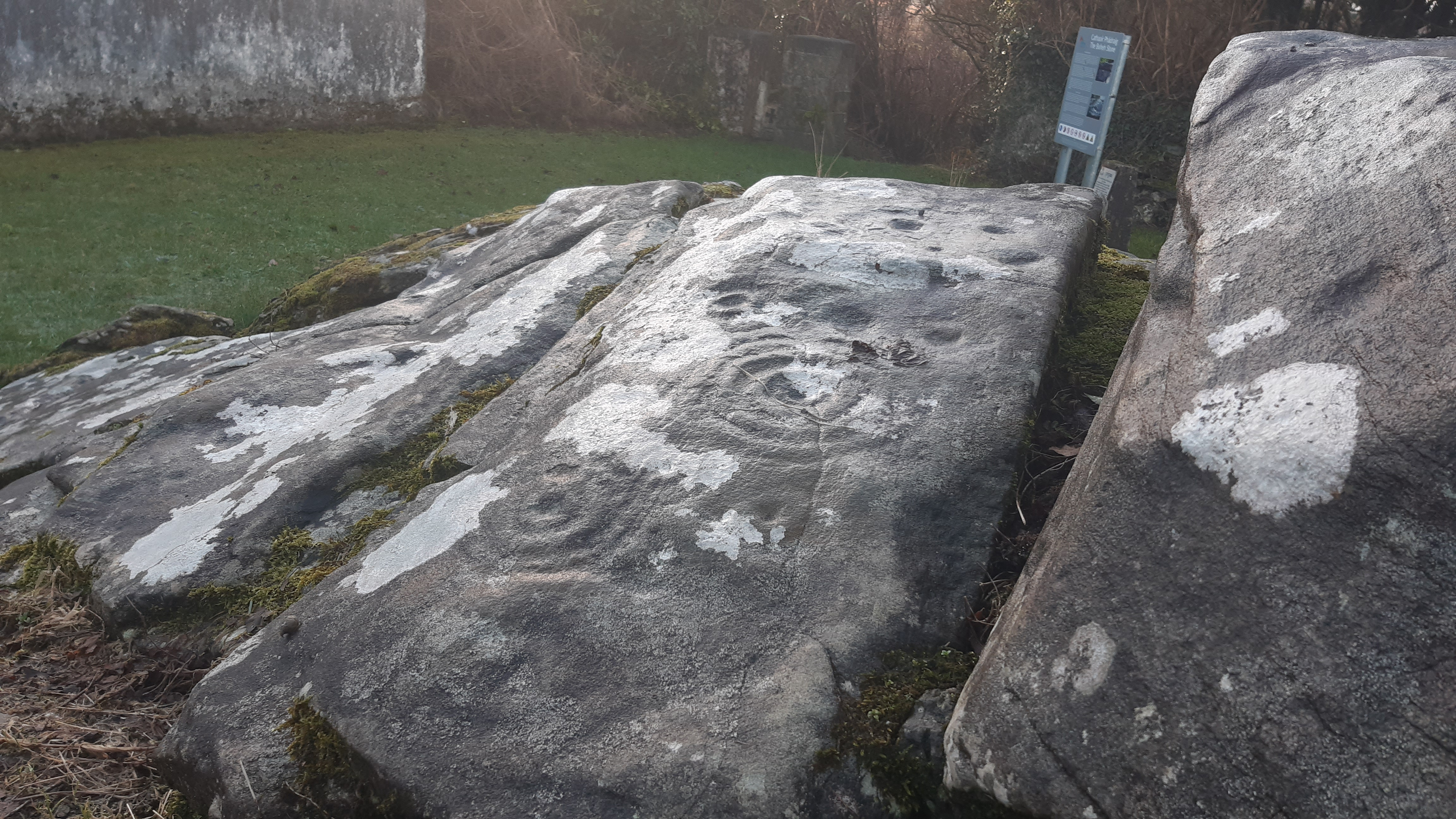
Markings in the rock

This stone was later Christianised and called St Patrick's Chair. It was made a waypoint on Tóchar Phádraig, a pilgrimage route; formerly this path led from Rathcroghan to Croagh Patrick.

The "rolling sun" phenomenon was rediscovered in 1989–92 by Gerry Bracken. A new panel of carving was found in 2014 by Michael Gibbons.

In the 2023 book and exhibition "Three Stones: The Cross and the Circle", Rónán Lynch wrote that the carvings on the top stone appear to represent the constellations of Crux and Centaurus, last visible from Ireland around 4,100 BC.

== Description ==
The Boheh Stone is one of the finest examples of Neolithic rock art in Ireland, covered in many cup and ring marks and keyhole motifs; about 250 petroglyphs in total. It is a natural outcrop flecked with quartz.

=== Rolling sun ===
Twice a year (18 April and 24 August by the Gregorian calendar), from the vantage point at the Boheh Stone, the sun can be seen to set at the summit of Croagh Patrick (7.1 km / 4.4 mi to the WNW) and appears to roll down its northern shoulder.
