= Drung Hill =

Mountain in Kerry, Ireland

- Cnoc Droinge
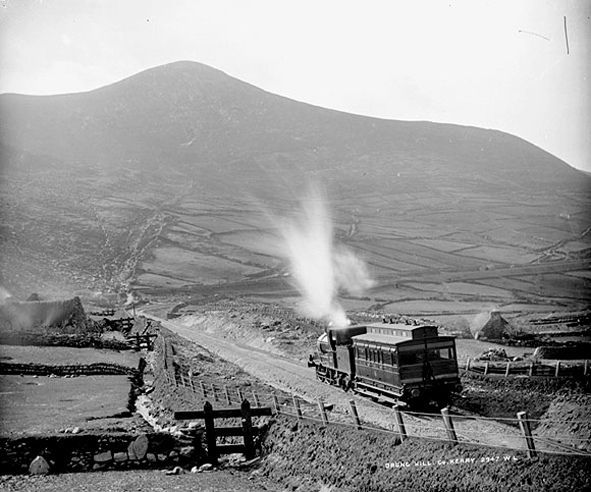
- Drung Hill with inspection car likely about 1893

Highest point
- Elevation: 640 m (2,100 ft)
- Coordinates: 52°1′36″N 10°2′11″W

Geography
- Location within Ireland
- Location: County Kerry, Ireland
- Parent range: Mountains of the Iveragh Peninsula
- OSI/OSNI grid: V603878

Drung Hill (Irish: Cnoc Droinge) is a hill on the Iveragh Peninsula of southwestern Ireland. Overlooking the Atlantic Ocean, its summit is 640 metres (2,100 ft) tall. Like the peak of Knocknadobar to the west, it has been a pilgrimage site since pre-Christian times.

== History ==
The name of the hill means 'gathering place' in Gaelic.

Historically, the summit served as a boundary marker between different kingdoms.

Until 1880, the harvest festival of Lughnasa was held at the end of every July on the summit. On the last Sunday of July, Domhnach na dTuras ('Pilgrimage Sunday') would be held, during which there would be gatherings on the summits of Drung Hill and Knocknadobar, with special meals cooked in open fires. In the November 1913 issue of the Kerry Archaeological Magazine, M. J. Delap reported that pilgrims came from as far as Limerick.

== Sites of interest ==
There are two cairns on an old road below the summit of Drung Hill. The larger cairn, which has a diameter of approximately 30 metres, is known as Laghtfinnan and may have been erected in prehistoric times. Laghtfinnan was likely a Bronze Age or Neolithic burial site. On top of the cairn, there is a leacht with an Ogham inscription on it that reads [...] MAQI R[...], signifying that the name of the commemorated person's father began with the letter R.

Cahircanaway (also written as Cahir-Canaway), the smaller of the two cairns, is 2.5 metres high. It may have been the site of the inauguration of Fineen MacCarthy Reagh, the final Mac Cárthaigh Mór, by the Ó Súilleabháin Mór (O'Sullivan Mor) in January 1600.

Tobar Fhíonáin (Gaelic: 'Fionán's well'), a former holy well on Drung Hill named after St Fionán of Iveragh (Iveragh's most important saint), was also likely used during pilgrimage rituals.

== Access ==
A section of the Kerry Way known as the Butter Road traverses the northern slopes of Drung Hill. The path was used to transport butter and other goods from Cork to Kerry.

== See also ==
- Knocknadobar
- Lists of mountains in Ireland
- List of mountains of the British Isles by height
