= Gougane Barra =

Valley and heritage site in County Cork, Ireland

Gougane Barra Guagán Barra
- District
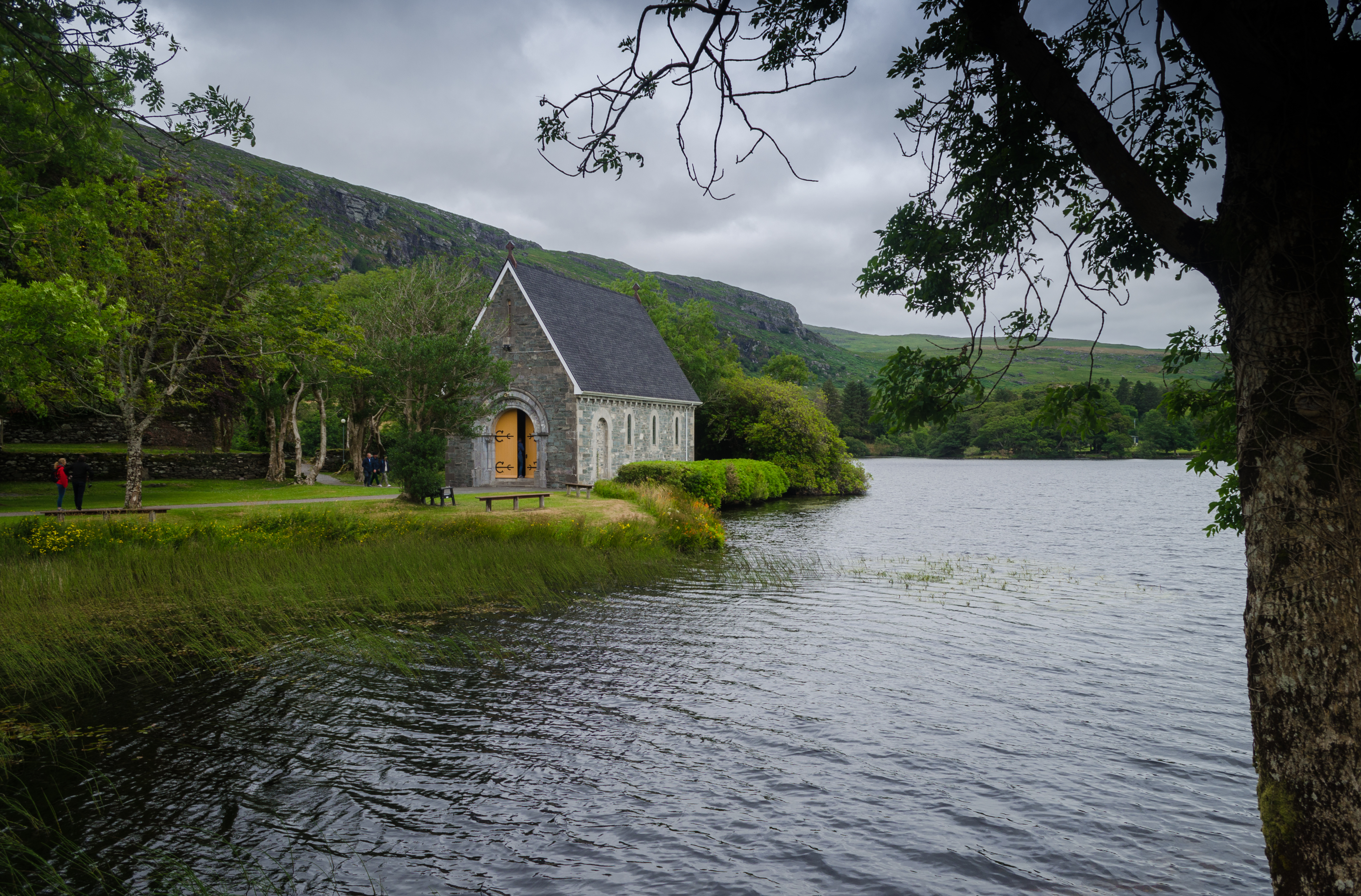
- Gougane Barra oratory

- Location in Ireland
- Coordinates: 51°50′20″N 09°19′09″W
- Country: Ireland
- Province: Munster
- County: County Cork

Gougane Barra (Irish: Guagán Barra, meaning 'the rock-cleft of Barra') is a scenic valley and heritage site in the Shehy Mountains of County Cork, Ireland. It is near Ballingeary in the Muskerry Gaeltacht. Gougane Barra is at the source of the River Lee and includes a lake with an oratory built on a small island. It also includes a forest park.

== History ==
The name Guagán Barra comes from Saint Finnbarr (or Barra), who is said to have brought Christianity to the southwest of Ireland. St. Finbar built a monastery on the island in the lake during the sixth century. The present ruins of a hermitage date from around 1700 when a priest called Denis O'Mahony retreated to the island. During the times of the Penal Laws, Gougane Barra's remoteness meant that it became a popular place for the celebration of the Roman Catholic Mass. The nineteenth century oratory which stands near the original hermitage is famous for its picturesque location and richly decorated interior and is a popular place for wedding photography. St Finbar's Oratory is the final destination for one of the five Pilgrim Paths of Ireland, St Finbar's Pilgrim Path, which starts 35 kilometres (22 mi) away in Drimoleague.

Reforestation of Gougane Barra began in 1938 and it is now home to a 1.42 square kilometres (142 ha; 350 acres) forest park with 20 tree species, mainly non-native Sitka spruce, Japanese larch and Lodgepole pine, but also Scots pine and other native species of flora and fauna. The source of the River Lee rises in the hills above the park and flows into Gougane lake. The forest park has 5 kilometres (3.1 mi) of motor trail and 10 kilometres (6.2 mi) of hill walks, nature points and vista trails. The Coillte-owned forest at Gougane Barra was temporarily closed in 2014 to allow felling of 16,000 trees, mostly larches, infected with or susceptible to Phytophthora ramorum, a pathogen responsible for sudden oak death. These trees were to be replaced with native species such as oak and Scots pine.

Since 2021, the company Wingleaf Ltd plans to erect a wind farm of seven turbines in the area, which would be among the tallest in Ireland. Their application was refused by Cork County Council, who voted unanimously against it. The company appealed to An Bord Pleanála. Their inspector also rejected it, stating that it "would have significant adverse environmental and visual impacts and is not sustainable at this highly sensitive location". Despite this, An Bord Pleanála granted permission, on the grounds that the wind farm would contribute "to the implementation of Ireland's national strategic policy on renewable energy". Tim Lucey, spokesman of the campaigners against the wind farm, said the decision was undemocratic as the local people and council opposed it.

== Gallery ==
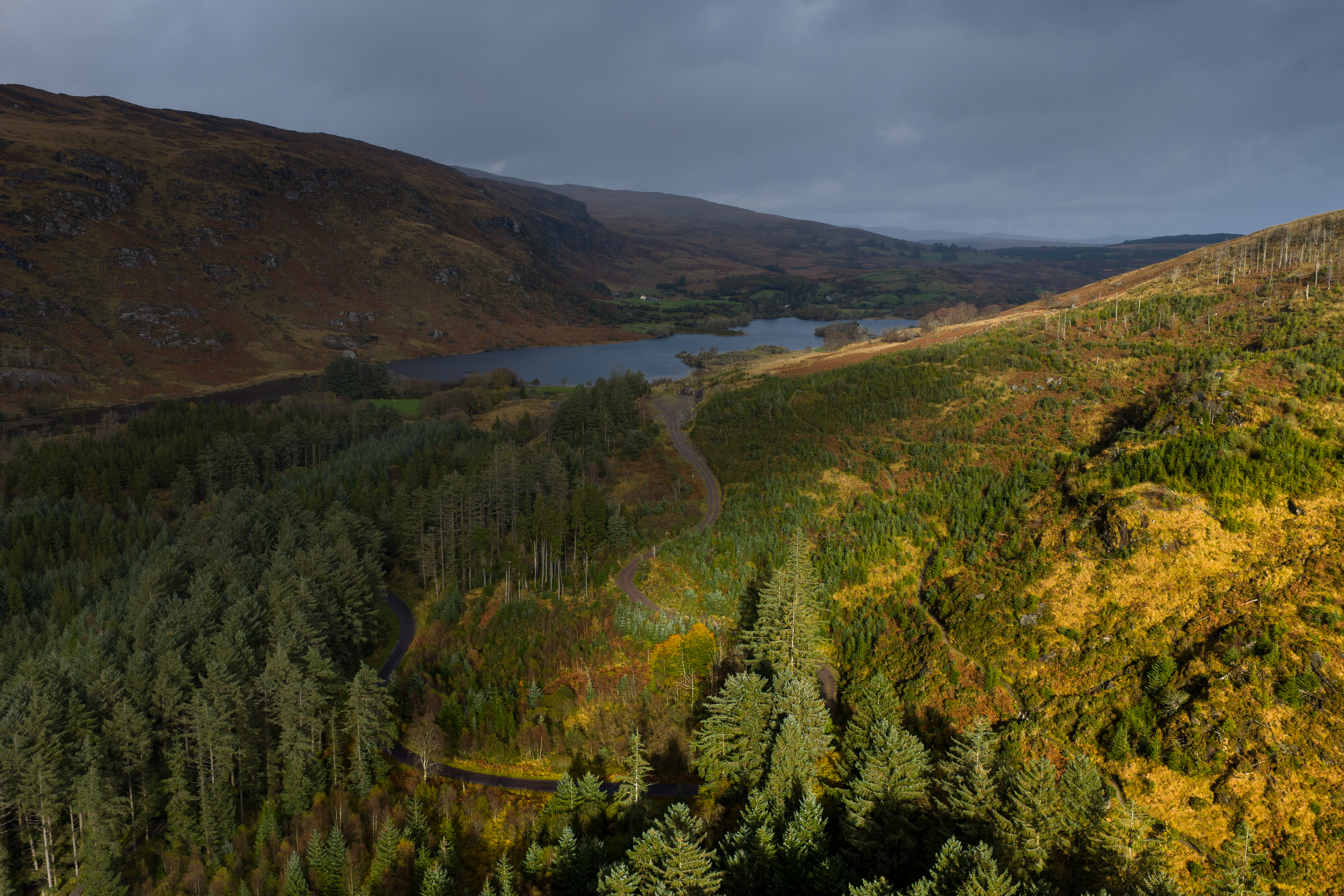
Aerial view onto the lake from south-west

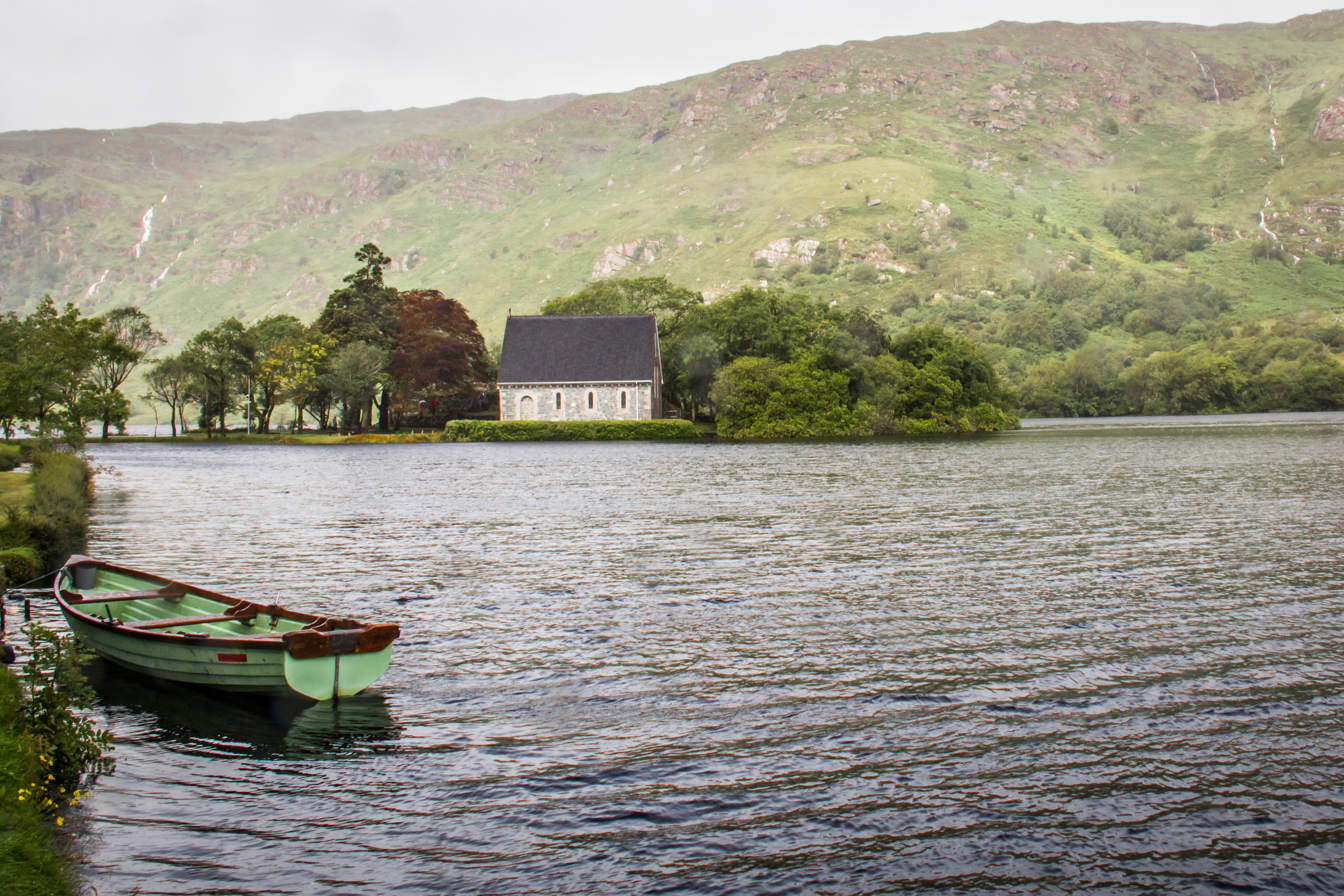
Lake and surrounding hills

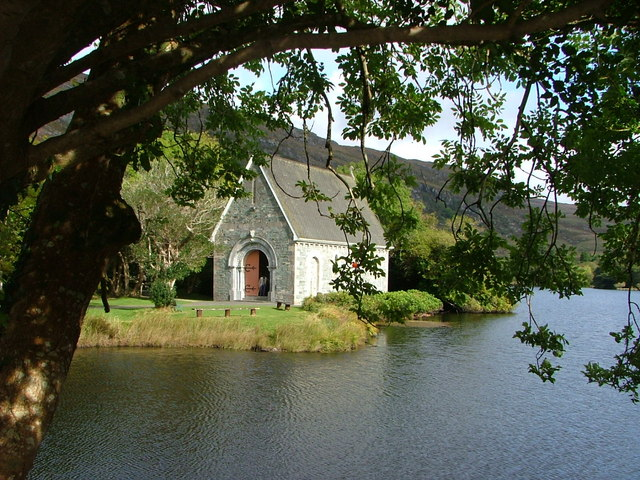
19th century oratory

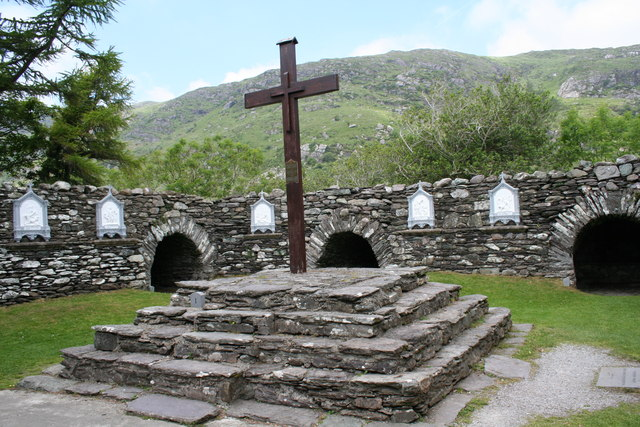
17th century hermitage
