= Wicklow Gap =

Mountain pass in County Wicklow, Ireland

- Bearna Chill Mhantáin
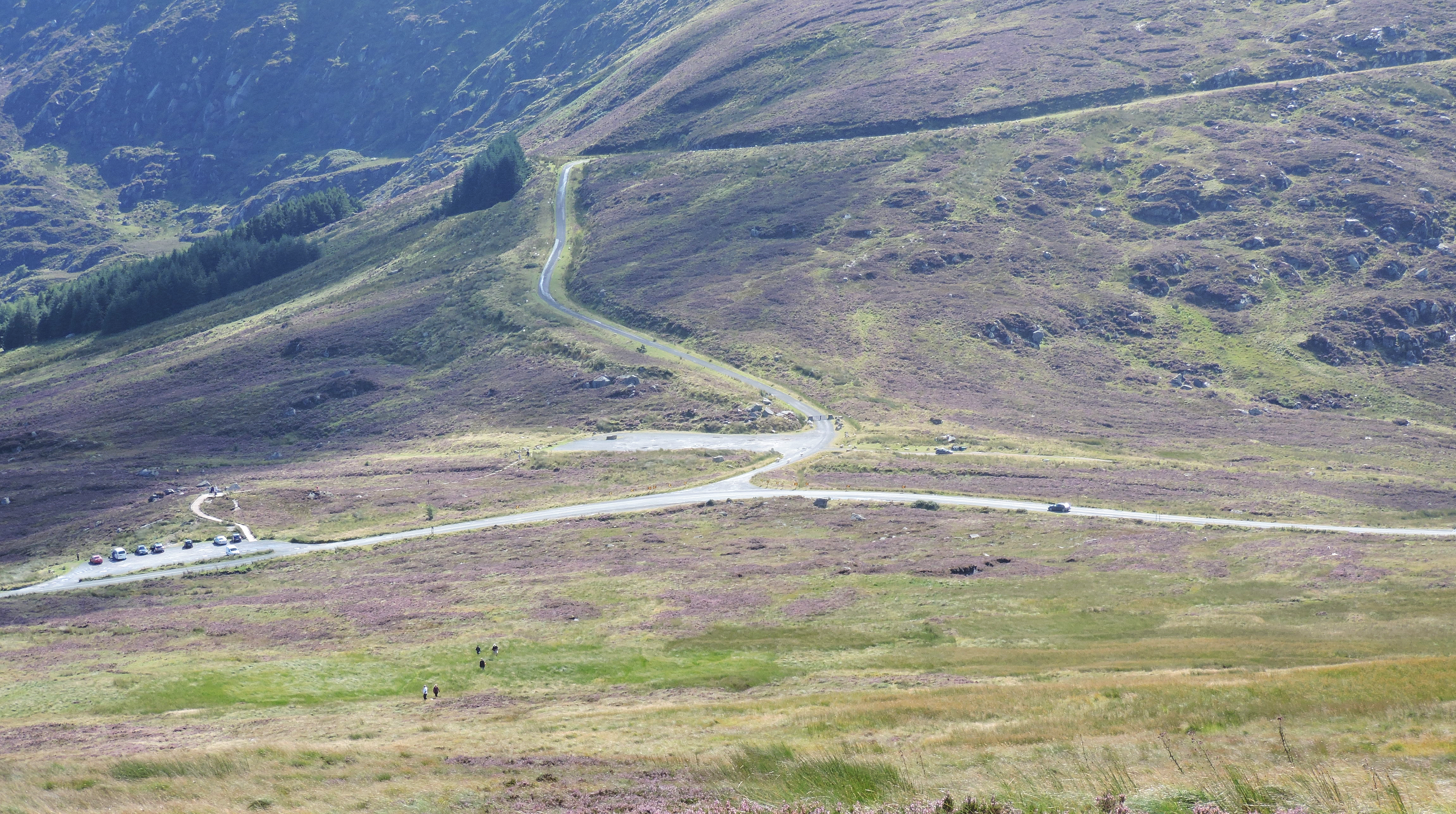
- The pass from Tonelagee slopes

- Location within Ireland
- Elevation: 475 metres (1,558 ft)
- Traversed by: Road

Third Approach
- Location: County Wicklow, Ireland
- Range: Wicklow Mountains
- Coordinates: 53°2′30.2″N 6°23′47.3″W

Wicklow Gap (Irish: Bearna Chill Mhantáin) is one of the highest Irish mountain passes served by an asphalted road. It is located in County Wicklow, Ireland.

== Geography ==
The 475-metre (1,558 ft) pass is opened between Tonelagee (North east) and Turlough Hill / Camaderry (South). It connects Dunlavin (West) and Glendalough, and with Sally Gap is one of the two road passes crossing the Wicklow Mountains. On clear days it is possible to look from the pass across the Irish Sea and see the mountains of Snowdonia (Wales).

== Access to the pass ==
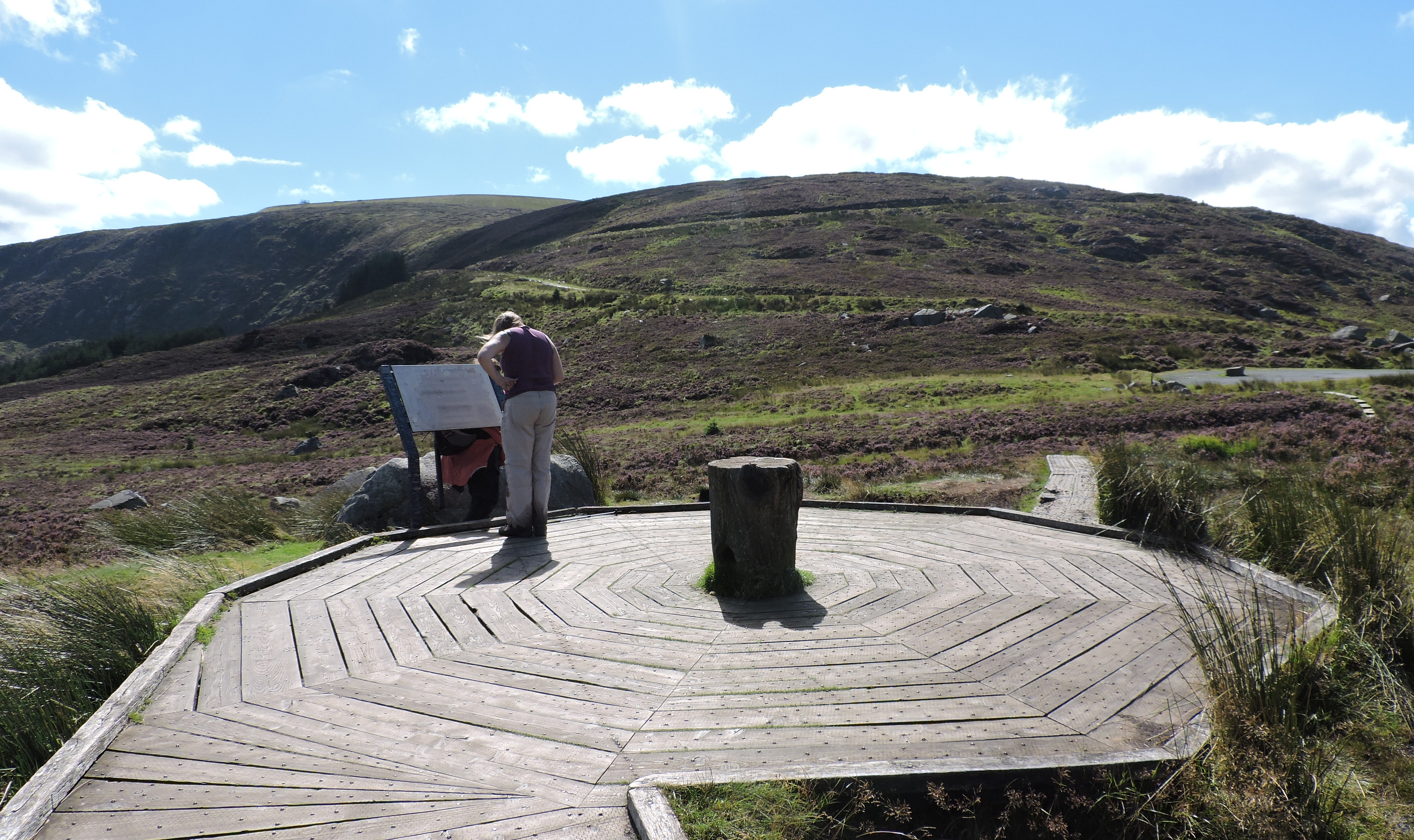
Wicklow Gap viewpoint

The scenic R756 road leads to the pass. The road is a popular bicycle ascent; it is considered a category 3 climb by the Tour de France. There is a short road leading from the pass to Turlough Hill, where there is a hydroelectric plant.

== Hiking ==
The pass is located on Saint Kevin's Way, a long distance waymarked walking trail, on its way from Hollywood to Glendalough.

It is possible to reach both Turlough Hill and Tonelagee by foot from the pass.

== See also ==
- List of mountain passes
