= Hollywood, County Wicklow =

Village in County Wicklow, Ireland

Hollywood Cillín Chaoimhín
- Village
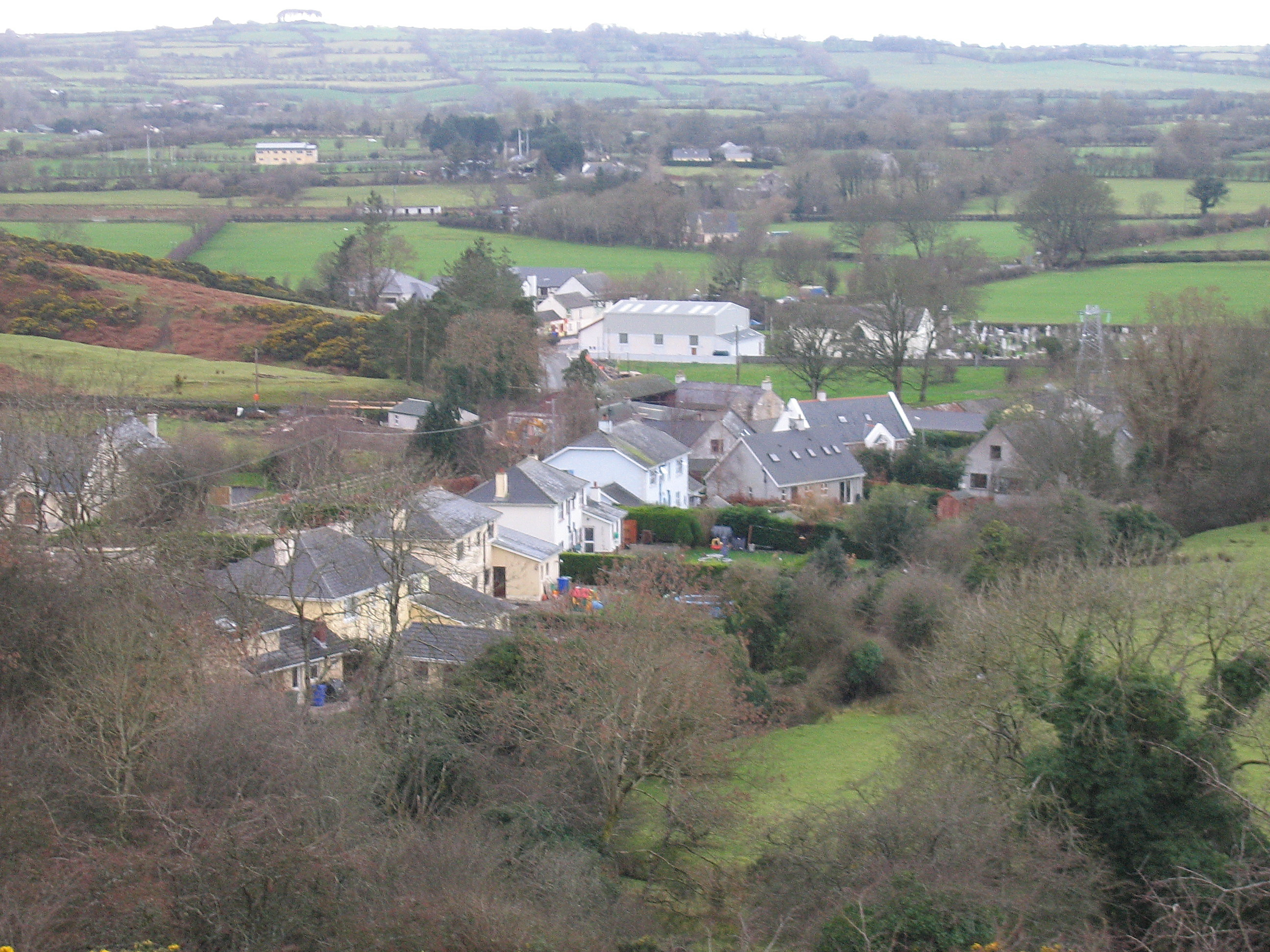
- Hollywood village

- Location in Ireland
- Coordinates: 53°05′26″N 6°36′07″W
- Country: Ireland
- Province: Leinster
- County: County Wicklow
- Elevation: 186 m (610 ft)
- Time zone: UTC+0 (WET)
  - Summer (DST): UTC-1 (IST (WEST))
- Irish Grid Reference: N938055

Hollywood (Irish: Cillín Chaoimhín, meaning 'Kevin's small church') is a village in west County Wicklow, Ireland. It is 15 km (9 mi) south of Naas on the Wicklow Gap road near its junction with the N81 road. A population of less than 100 people registered in the 2002 Census, though the community draws from a larger area which consists of about 500 people. The village is in a civil parish of the same name.

== Etymology ==
Cillín Chaoimhín is the associated Irish name for Hollywood; its literal translation being Kevin's Small Church. Another, older Irish name is Cnoic Rua, literally meaning Red Hill. This may be a reference to the red berries of holly trees on the hills above the village or it may in fact be a reference to the presence of Wicklow heather. Another possibility is that the original name for Hollywood may have been Holy Wood, as a reference to Saint Kevin's passage through.

== Pilgrimage ==
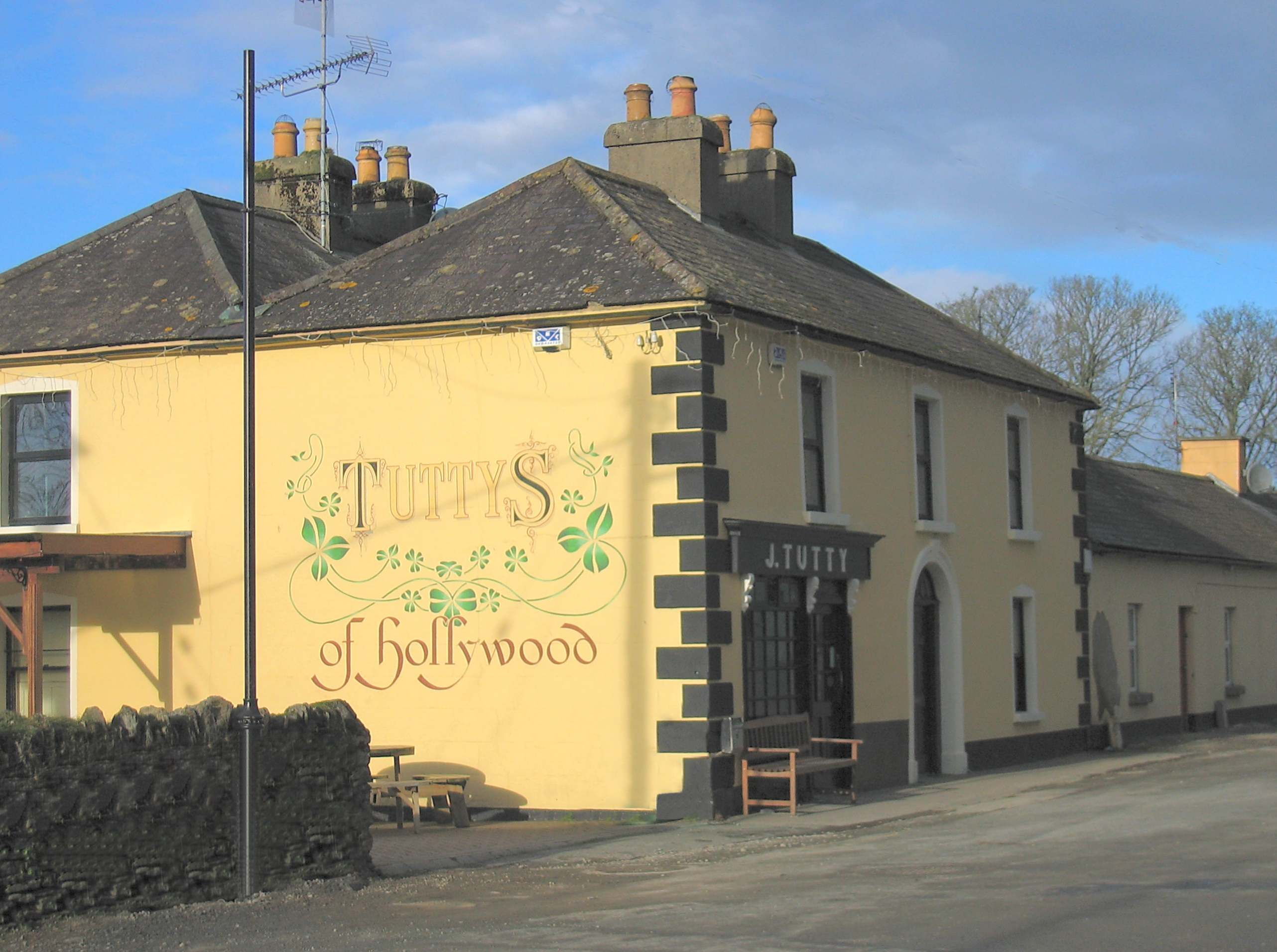
Tutty's of Hollywood.

The village has an association with 6th Century Saint Kevin and many pilgrims passed through, following in Saint Kevin's footsteps, on their way to the monastic settlement at Glendalough, until the practice ceased in the early 1900s. Local landmarks include Saint Kevin's Chair, and Saint Kevin's Cave. Saint Kevin's Way is a 30 km pilgrim path from Hollywood to Glendalough, and is connected to the Wicklow Mountains National Park.

== Surroundings ==
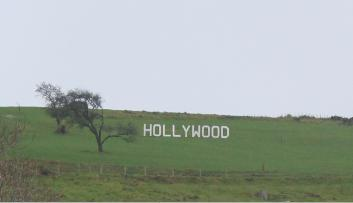
Sign in Hollywood, Co. Wicklow

The Church of Ireland in the village church has a vaulted roof from the 17th century. About 3 km northeast of the village is Poulaphouca, where the Liffey cascades in three stages. The Poulaphouca Reservoir (also known as Blessington Lakes), which cover about 5,000 acres (20 km^{2}) or 20 km^{2}, were formed in the mid-20th century by the building of the Poulaphouca Dam and hydroelectric power station, and today serve the purpose of providing the power and water that supply County Dublin.

The Bronze Age Piper's Stones, are 3.5 km to the southwest of Hollywood on the N81. The site is signposted.

Dancing at Lughnasa, and Michael Collins. An imitation of the iconic Hollywood Sign overlooks the village from a nearby hill. It also gave its name to an album by The Voice Squad which was recorded in St Kevin's Church.

== Filming location ==
The following films have been filmed in part in the village:

- Michael Collins (1996) (specifically Hollywood Glen)
- Dancing at Lughnasa (1998)
- This Is My Father (1998)
- King Arthur (2004)
- One Hundred Mornings (2009)

== Notable people ==
- William R. D. Blackwood (1838–1922), surgeon and soldier in the American Civil War, born Hollywood
- Kevin Conneff, lives in Hollywood

== Gallery ==
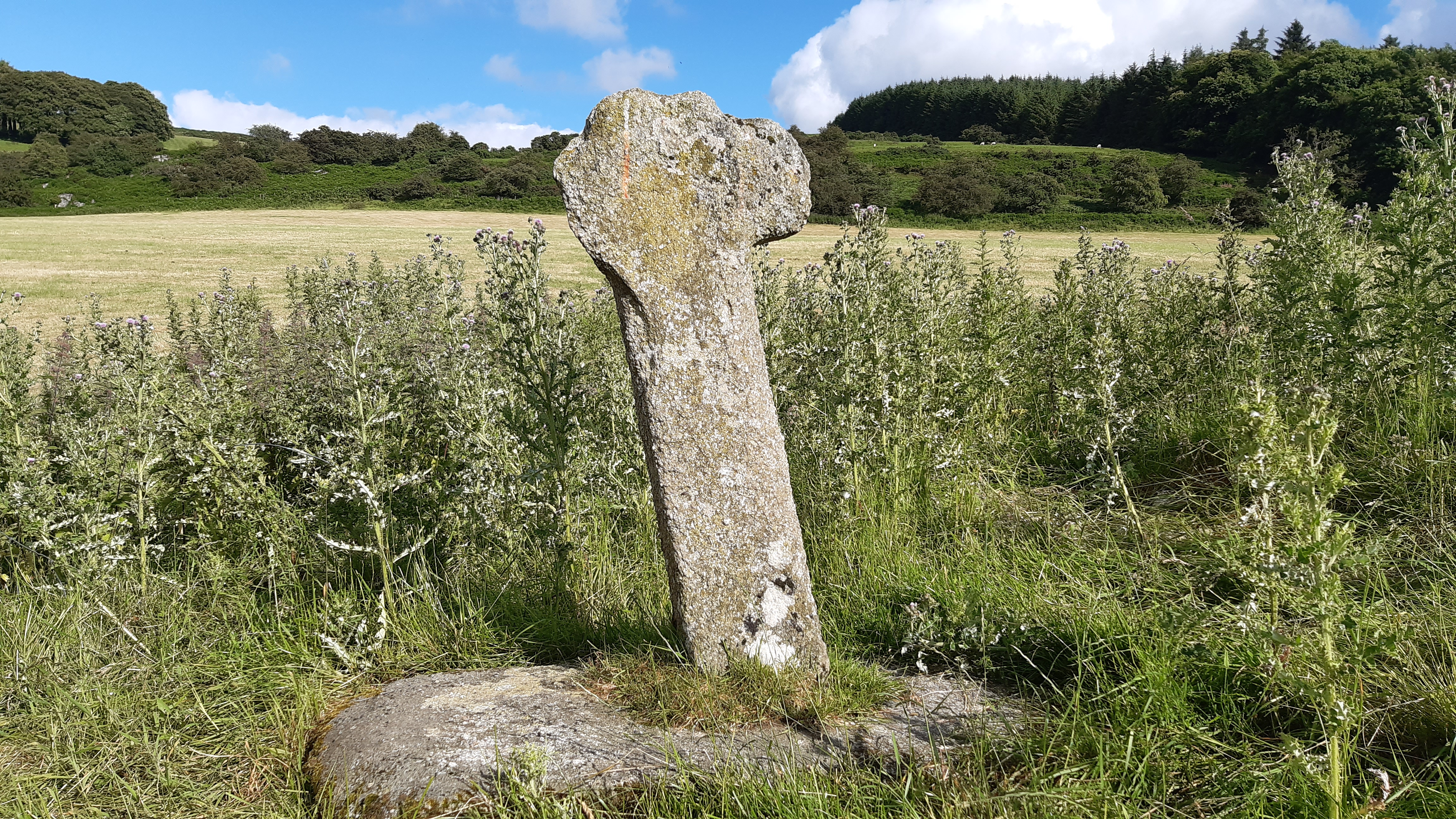
Ballysize Cross near Hollywood

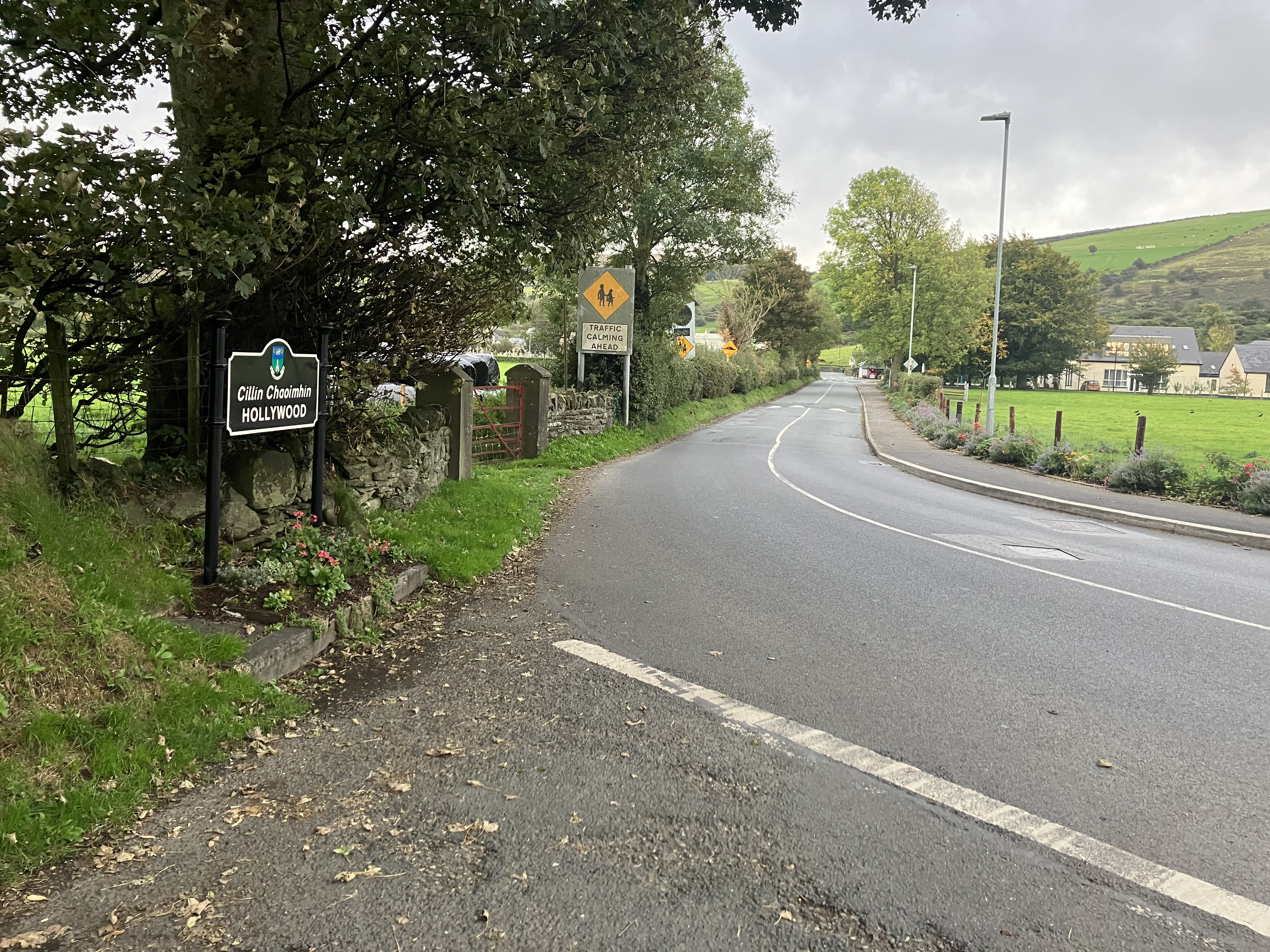
Entrance to village
