= Ballintubber Abbey =

Abbey in County Mayo, Ireland founded in 1216

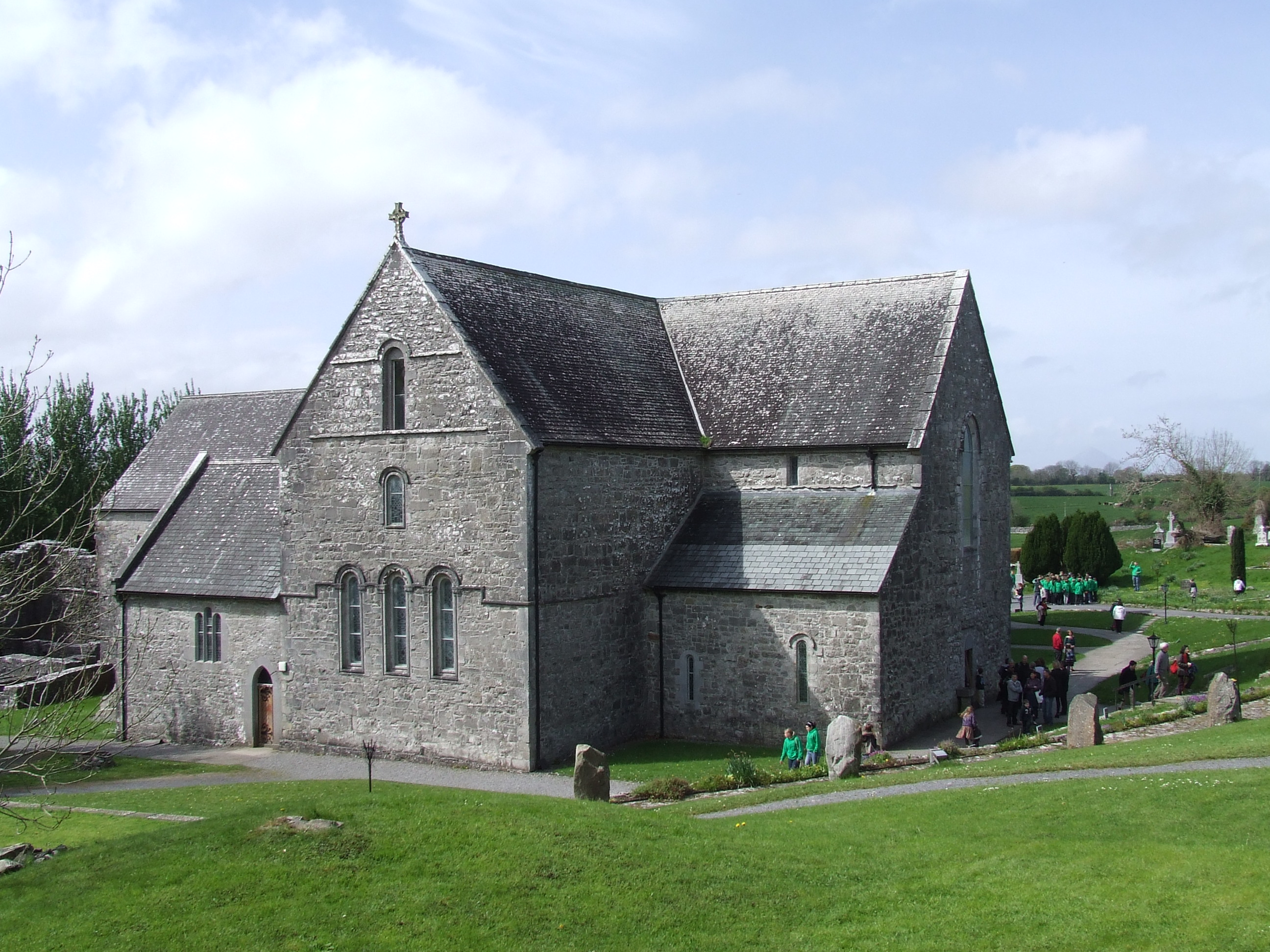
- Ballintubber Abbey, eastern elevation

- Location within Ireland
- 53.757267°N 9.282407°W
- Location: Ballintubber, County Mayo
- Country: Ireland
- Denomination: Catholic
- Religious institute: Formerly Augustinians
- Website: ballintubberabbey.ie

History
- Status: Active
- Founded: 1216
- Founder: King Cathal Crobdearg Ua Conchobair

Administration
- Diocese: Archdiocese of Tuam

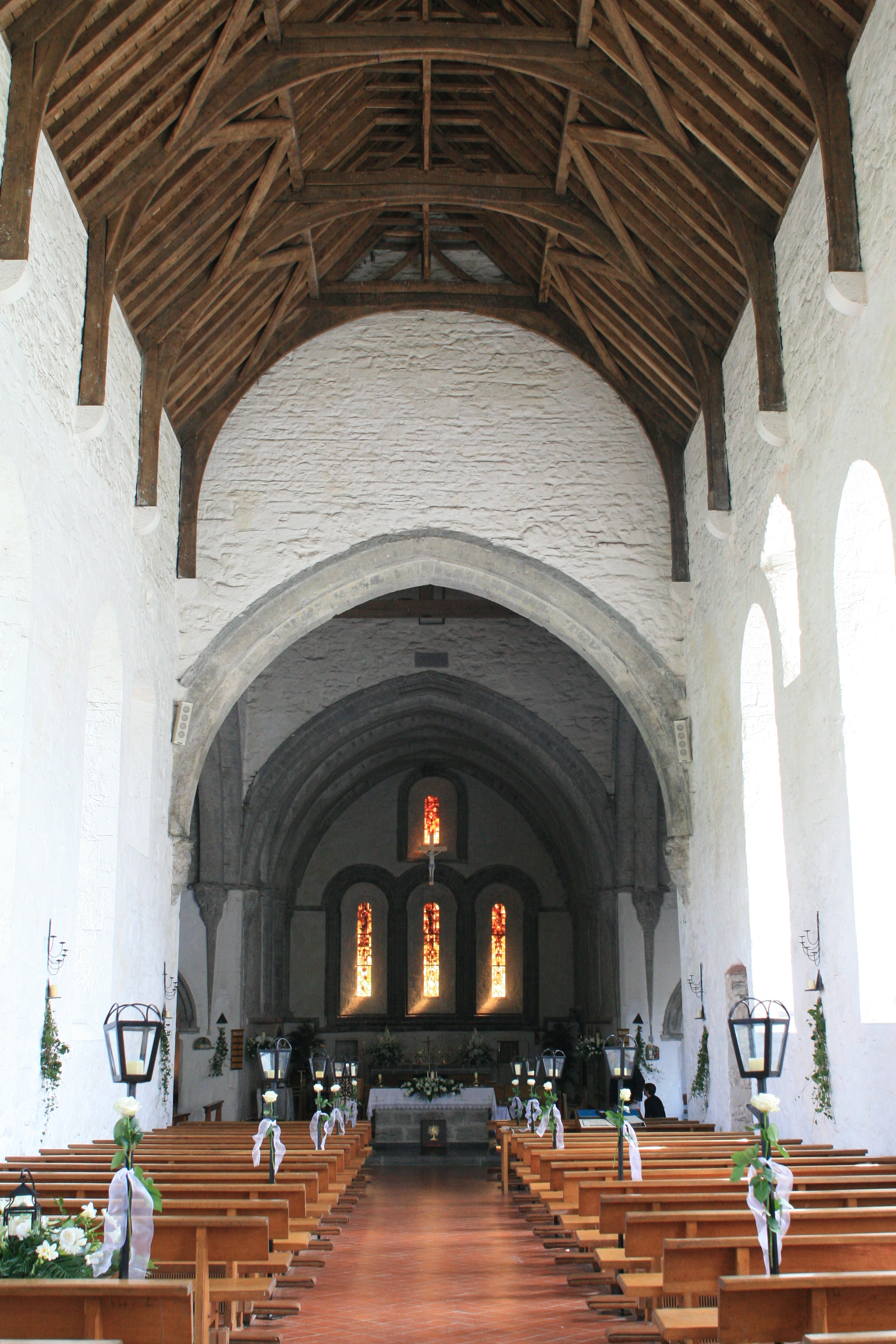
Image of the nave of Ballintubber Abbey

Ballintubber Abbey is an abbey two kilometres northeast of Ballintubber, County Mayo in Ireland that was founded by King Cathal Crobdearg Ua Conchobair in 1216.

== History ==
Despite being suppressed and damaged during the Protestant Reformation, the roofless abbey continued to be used throughout penal times by Catholics. In 1963, extensive archaeological excavations were carried out prior to starting restoration work. By 1966, the nave had been restored and re-roofed, in time for the 750th anniversary of the abbey's foundation although work continued until 1969. In 1997, the Chapter House and Dorter area were restored and re-roofed. In 2016, during the 800th anniversary celebrations, planning permission to restore the entire east wing was granted.

The abbey has several modern outdoor attractions, including a very modern abstract Stations of the Cross, an underground permanent Crib, and a Rosary Way. There is a small museum. According to the Ballintubber website and other popular accounts, John O'Mullowny of Ballyhean, an infamous local priest hunter, is buried in the cemetery. A large tree marks the spot. The abbey marks the beginning of Tóchar Phádraig, the ancient pilgrimage route to Croagh Patrick, reopened by Pilgrim Paths of Ireland. A 35-km trail from Ballintubber Abbey to the top of Croagh Patrick has been developed, part of what is also being named the Ireland West Camino, following the model of the Camino de Santiago in Spain.

== Architecture ==
=== Introduction ===
Ballintubber Abbey was built in 1216 in the Hiberno Romanesque style, characterized by the chevron archivolts and foliate capitals of the three light-transitional windows to the east. The design is a Latin-cross foundation with a nave, crossing transepts, and a rib-vaulted chancel with two chapels for each side. The abbey has gone through various renovations, mainly on re-building portions that became damaged as it withstood history. There are three renovation attempts to note: the first in 1846 led by Archbishop John MacHale, the second in 1881 overseen by George Coppinger Ashlin, finally, the third restoration in 1909 with Reverend Thomas A. Egan and Percy le Clerc leading the project.

=== Renovations ===
In 1265, a fire burned the timber and oak shingles of the nave to ashes, but the stone portion of the east was left standing. The resulting restorations in 1270 had Gothic elements, including the pointed arches seen throughout.

The Cromwellian assault in 1653 destroyed the monastic buildings, dormitories, cloisters, and domestic quarters; all of the timber structures inside the abbey were also taken down. After the assault, only the stone vaulted roofs of the chancel, the four sides of the chapels, and the old sacristy remained.

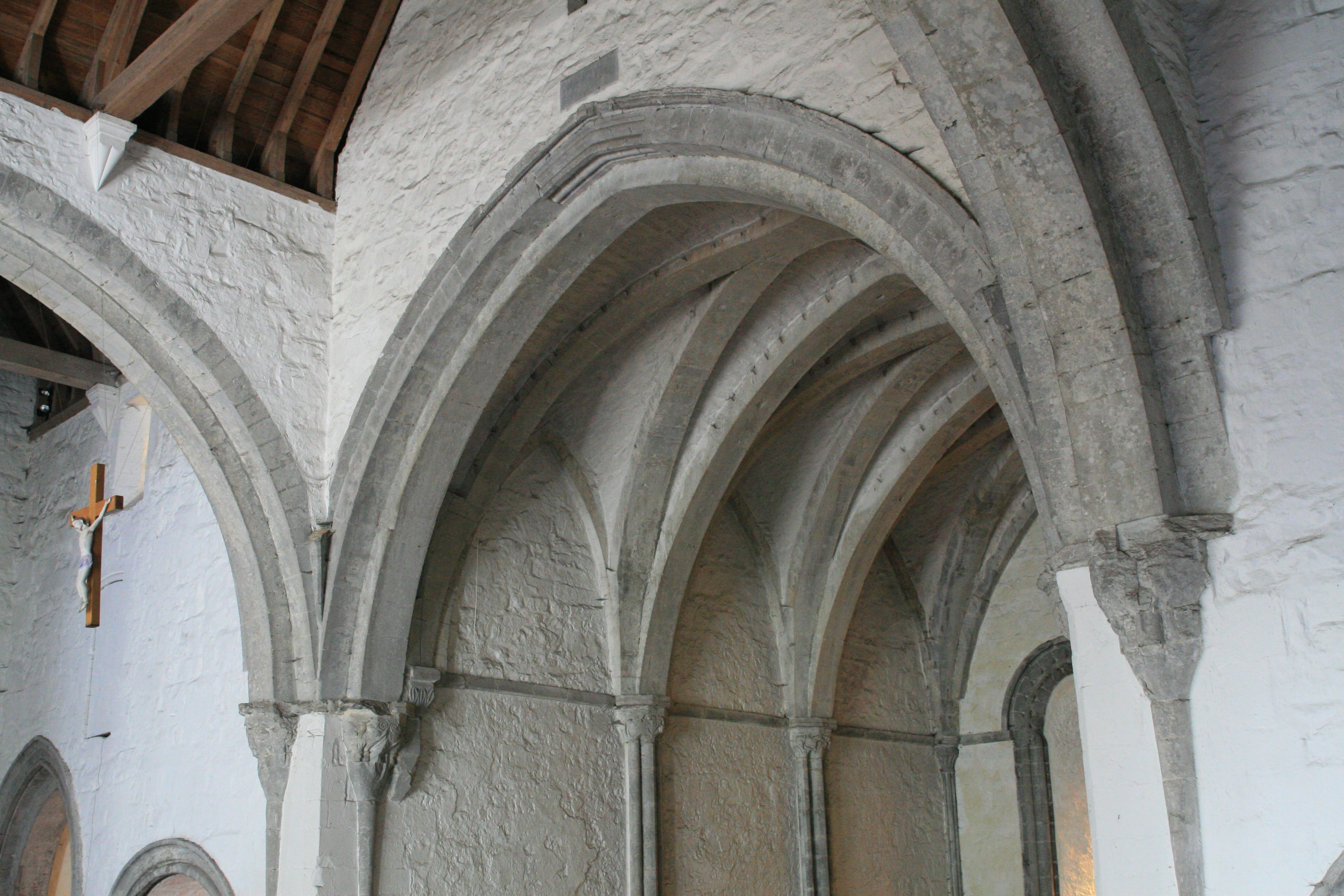
Crossing and vault inside Ballintubber Abbey

The first renovation attempts in 1846, led by Archbishop John MacHale, was tasked with re-roofing the nave and the transepts. However, this was interrupted and abandoned in 1847 due to the Great Famine, and funds were also used elsewhere as a result. Renovations performed at this time also spurred a bit of upset as the work was seen as out of character with the architecture of the old building.

The second restoration attempt in 1881-1890 was more successful in completing the project. George Coppinger Ashlin supervised the work being done. With the support of wealthy benefactors, the walls were reinforced, the openings between the transepts were glazed, and the east window of "stained glass of medieval pattern procured from Mayer & Co. of Munich" was installed. Ashlin also completed the roofing of the chancel, crossing, and transepts.

The third restoration took place from 1909 to 1979, supervised by the Reverend Thomas A. Egan and Percy le Clerc, the Inspector of National Monuments at the time. The nave was given a roof and the interior was restored to how it would have appeared in the thirteenth century. It consists of a tessellated quarry tile floor, re-glazed clear glass, and an exposed oak roof. Another aspect of the interior is the rib-vaulted chancel with carved capitals of animals and birds with leaves and plant inclusions. The restorations were done under the liturgical reforms sanctioned by the Second Council of the Vatican.

In 1994, the Chapter House adjoining the south transept was also re-roofed as a meeting space for members to use. In 1997 the Chapter House and Dorter portion of Ballintubber Abbey was also given a roof and some restoration efforts were performed. Recently, the walls of the dormitory were raised and roofed, and a section of the arcaded cloister was given a glass roof for visitor comfort and protection from the weather.

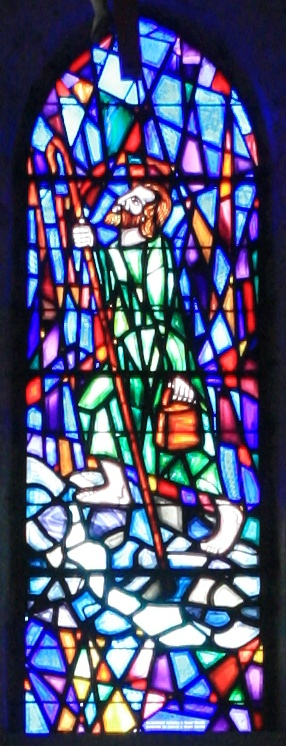
North transept stained glass window

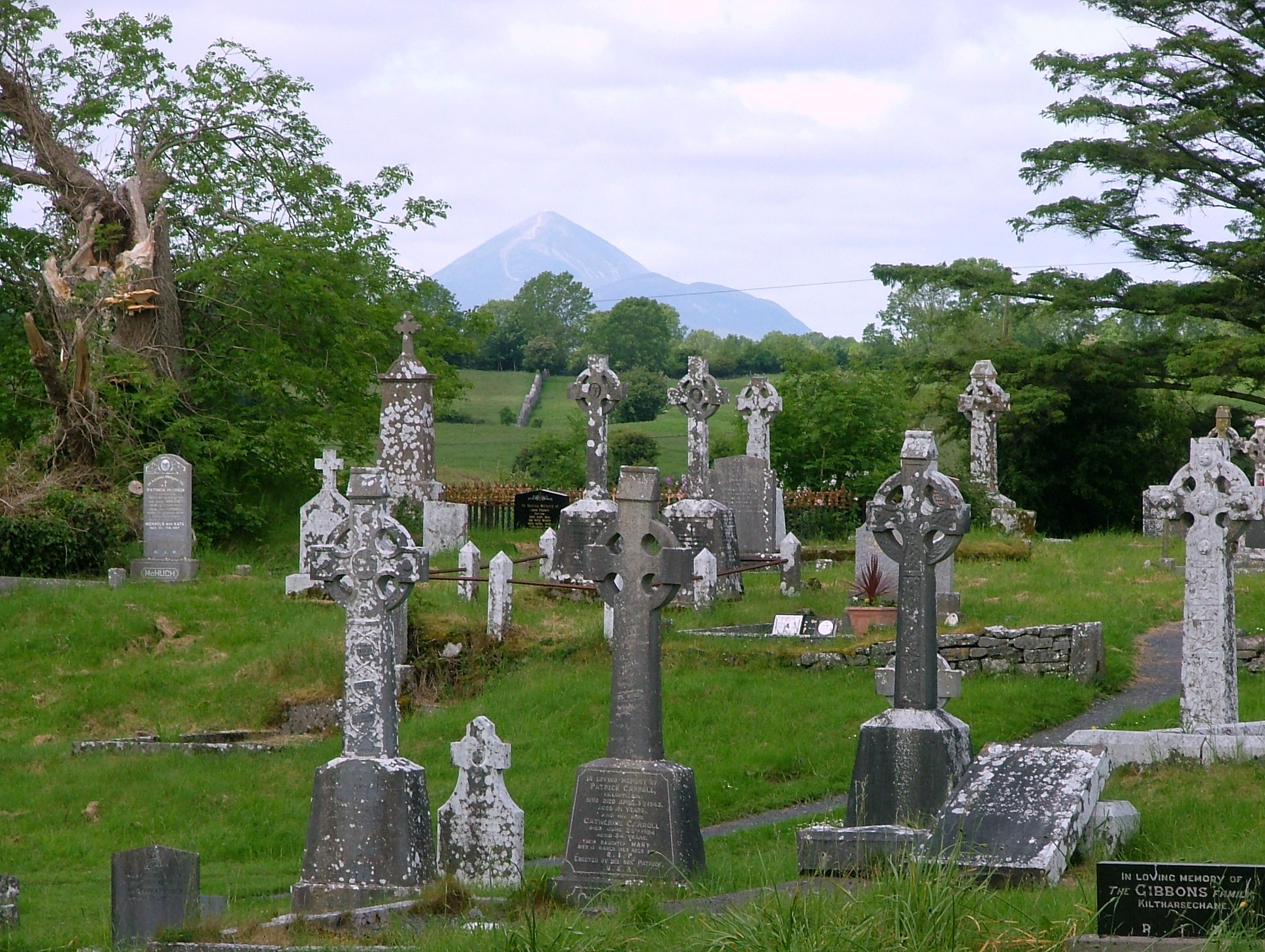
BALLINTUBBER ABBEY - panoramio

== Other burials ==
- Tibbot ne Long Bourke, 1st Viscount Mayo

== See also ==
- List of abbeys and priories in Ireland (County Mayo)
- Pilgrim Paths of Ireland
