= Croagh Patrick =

Mountain in County Mayo, Ireland

- Cruach Phádraig 'The Reek'
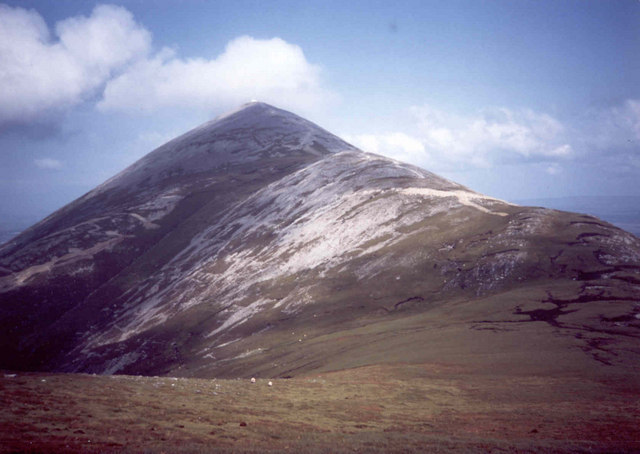

Highest point
- Elevation: 764 m (2,507 ft)
- Prominence: 639 m (2,096 ft)
- Listing: P600, Marilyn, Hewitt
- Coordinates: 53.7595°N 9.6584°W

Naming
- English translation: (Saint) Patrick's stack
- Language of name: Irish

Geography
- Location within Ireland
- Location: County Mayo, Ireland
- OSI/OSNI grid: L906802
- Topo map: OSi Discovery 30, 31, 37 or 38

Climbing
- Easiest route: Hike

Croagh Patrick (Irish: Cruach Phádraig, meaning '(Saint) Patrick's stack'), nicknamed 'the Reek', is a mountain with a height of 764 m (2,507 ft) and an important site of pilgrimage in County Mayo, Ireland. The mountain has a pyramid-shaped peak and overlooks Clew Bay, rising above the village of Murrisk, several kilometres from Westport.

It has long been seen as a holy mountain. It was the focus of a prehistoric ritual landscape, and later became associated with Saint Patrick, who is said to have spent forty days fasting on the summit. There has been a church on the summit since the 5th century; the current church dates to the early 20th century. Croagh Patrick is climbed by thousands of pilgrims every year on Reek Sunday, the last Sunday in July, a custom which goes back to at least the Middle Ages.

Croagh Patrick is the fourth-highest mountain in the province of Connacht on the P600 listing after Mweelrea, Nephin and Barrclashcame. It is part of a longer east–west ridge; the lower westernmost peak is named Ben Goram.

== Name ==
'Croagh Patrick' comes from the Irish Cruach Phádraig meaning "(Saint) Patrick's stack". It is known locally as "the Reek", a Hiberno-English word for a "rick" or "stack". Previously it was known as Cruachán Aigle or Cruach Aigle, being mentioned by that name in medieval sources such as Cath Maige Tuired, Buile Shuibhne, The Metrical Dindshenchas, and the Annals of Ulster entry for the year 1113. Cruachán is simply a diminutive of cruach meaning "stack" or "peak". Aigle was an old name for the area. The Dindsenchas (lore of places) says that Aigle was a prince of Connacht who was slain by his uncle Cromderg in revenge for his slaying of a woman under Cromderg's care. It is also suggested that Aigle is an alternative form of aicil, "eagle".

The Marquess of Sligo, whose seat was nearby Westport House, bears the titles Baron Mount Eagle and Earl of Altamont ("high mount"), both deriving from Croagh Patrick.

== Historical significance ==
Perhaps because of its prominence, its pyramidal quartzite peak, and the legends associated with it, Croagh Patrick has long been seen as a holy mountain.

Archaeologist Christiaan Corlett writes that the large number of prehistoric monuments surrounding and oriented towards Croagh Patrick "suggests that the mountain has been a local spiritual inspiration since at least the Neolithic, and during the Bronze Age became the focus of an extensive ritual landscape".

A short distance east of the mountain lies the Boheh Stone, an outcrop covered with ancient rock art. There are more than 260 carvings, making it one of the most detailed pieces of ancient rock art in Ireland, and one of only two in the province of Connacht. In 1987 it was rediscovered that, from the Boheh stone, the setting sun appears to roll down the slope of Croagh Patrick in late April and late August. It is believed the stone was chosen because of this natural phenomenon. A stone row at Killadangan is aligned with a niche in the mountain where the sun sets on the winter solstice.

Archaeological surveying found remains of an enclosure encircling the mountaintop and dozens of circular huts abutting it, which showed evidence of Bronze Age date.

Tírechán, a native of Connacht, wrote in the 7th century that Saint Patrick spent forty days on the mountain, like Moses on Mount Sinai. The 9th century Bethu Phátraic says that Patrick was harassed by a flock of black demonic birds while on the peak, and he banished them into the hollow of Lugnademon ("hollow of the demons") by ringing his bell. Patrick ended his fast when God gave him the right to judge all the Irish at the Last Judgement, and agreed to spare the land from the final desolation. A later legend tells how Patrick was tormented by a demonic female serpent named Corra or Caorthannach. Patrick is said to have banished the serpent into Lough Na Corra below the mountain, or into a hollow from which the lake burst forth.

== Pilgrimage ==
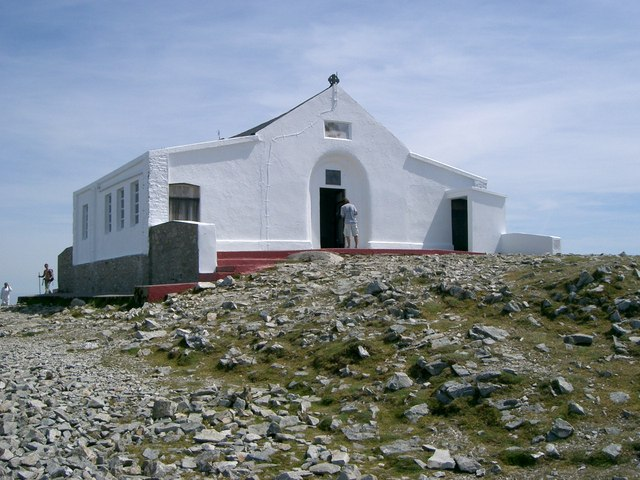
St. Patrick's Oratory at the summit

Archaeologists found that there had been a stone chapel or oratory on the summit since the 5th century. There is reference to a "Teampall Phádraig" (Patrick's Temple) from AD 824, when the Archbishops of Armagh and Tuam disagreed as to who had jurisdiction on the site. A small modern chapel was built on the summit and dedicated on 20 July 1905.

On the last Sunday in July, thousands of pilgrims climb Croagh Patrick in honour of Saint Patrick, and masses are held at the summit chapel. Some pilgrims climb the mountain barefoot, as an act of penance. Traditionally, pilgrims would perform 'rounding rituals', in which they pray while walking sunwise around features on the mountain. Among these are a group of three ancient cairns known as Reilig Mhuire (Mary's graveyard), which are likely Bronze Age burial cairns.

Folklorist Máire MacNeill conjectured that the pilgrimage pre-dates Christianity and was originally a ritual associated with the festival of Lughnasadh.

Today, most pilgrims climb Croagh Patrick from the direction of Murrisk Abbey to the north. Originally, most pilgrims climbed the mountain from the east, following the Togher Patrick (Tochár Phádraig) pilgrim path from Ballintubber Abbey. This route is dotted with prehistoric monuments, including the Boheh stone. Until 1970, it was traditional for pilgrims to climb the mountain after sunset. It is possible that this came from a pre-historic tradition of climbing the mountain after viewing the 'rolling sun' phenomenon. The Tochár Phádraig may have originally been the main route from Cruachan (seat of the Kings of Connacht) to Cruachan Aigle, the original name of Croagh Patrick. The Tochar Phadraig was revived and reopened as a cross-country pilgrimage tourist trail by Pilgrim Paths of Ireland; the 30-kilometre route takes about ten hours.

Local people and organisations point out that the large number of climbers – as many as 40,000 per year – have damaged the mountain by causing erosion which makes the climb more dangerous.

Local stakeholders have made efforts to combat the erosion caused by foot traffic through the creation of a stone path up the mountain, composed of stone from Croagh Patrick and assembled in a dry stone manner.

== Gold discovery ==
A seam of gold was discovered in the core of the mountain in the 1980s. Due to local resistance by the Mayo Environmental Group, headed by Paddy Hopkins, Mayo County Council decided not to allow mining on Croagh Patrick. The name of the Owenwee River (Abhainn Bhuí, yellow river) on the south of the mountain may indicate an ancient awareness of gold deposits in the area and gold panning in the river.

== Gallery ==
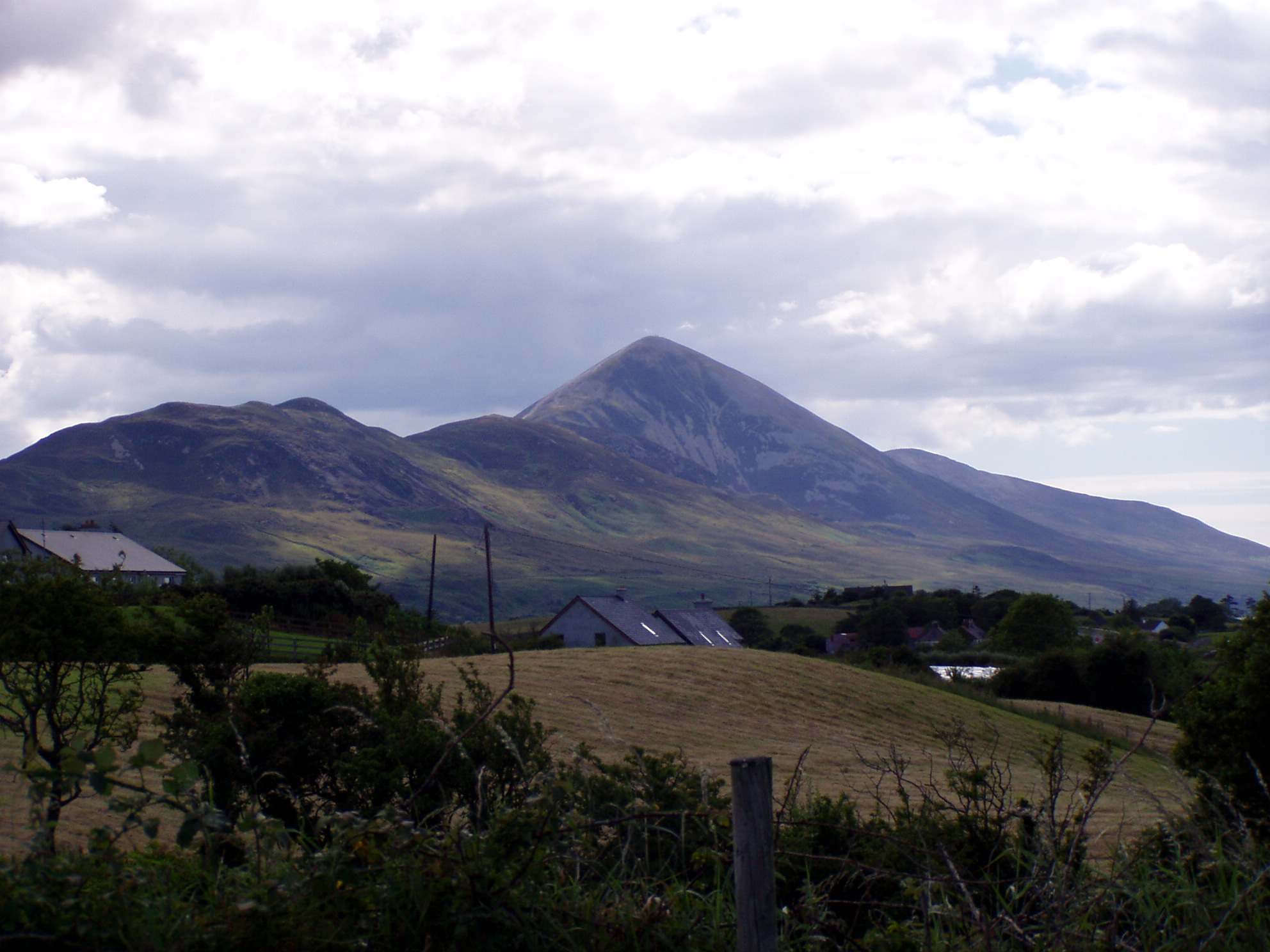
Distant view of mountain from Westport

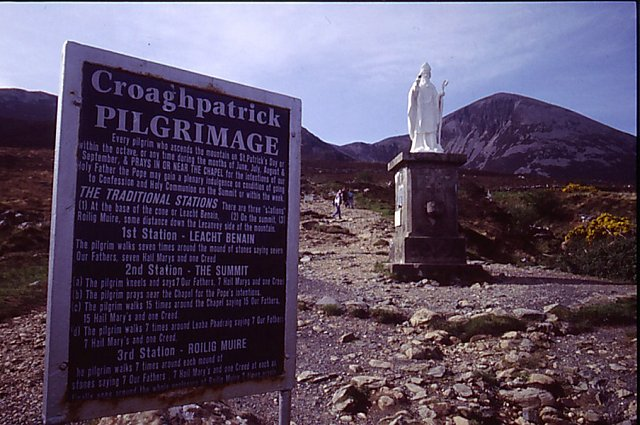
Notice at base about Stations for Catholic climbers, with statue of Saint Patrick

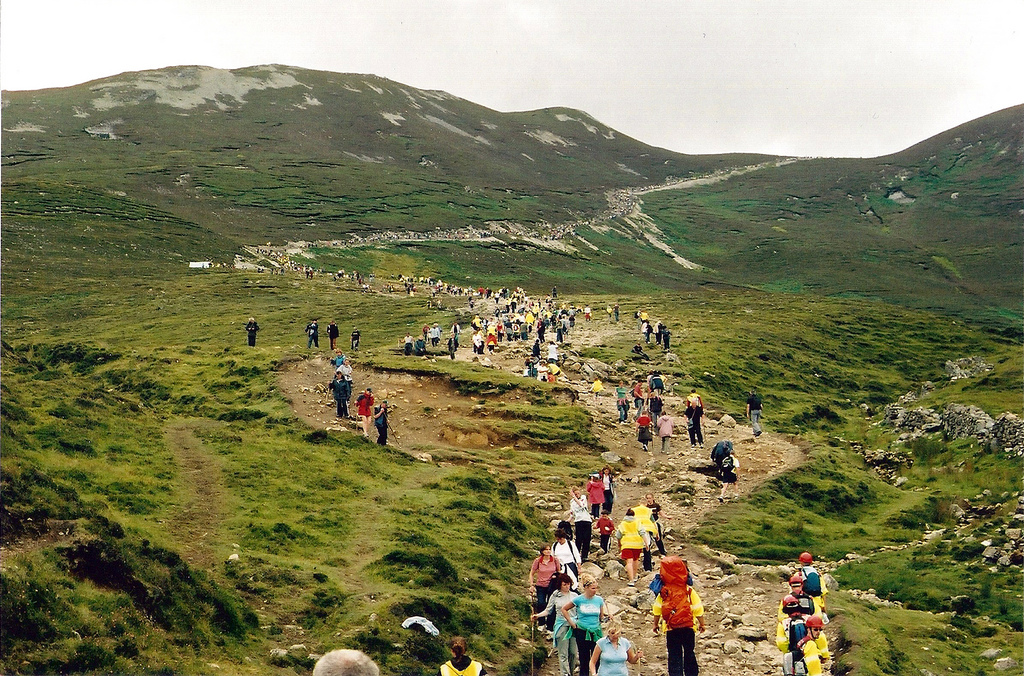
Pilgrims climbing the mountain (2007)

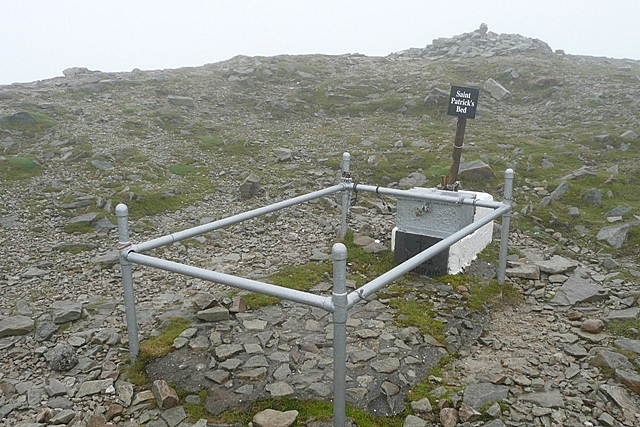
St. Patrick's Bed at the summit

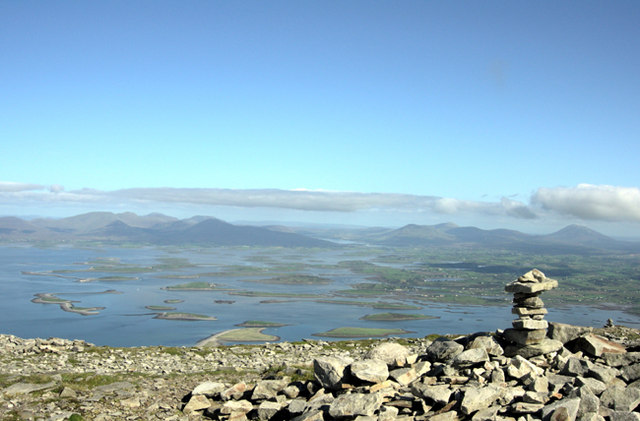
Cairn near summit with view of Clew Bay and Mayo mountains

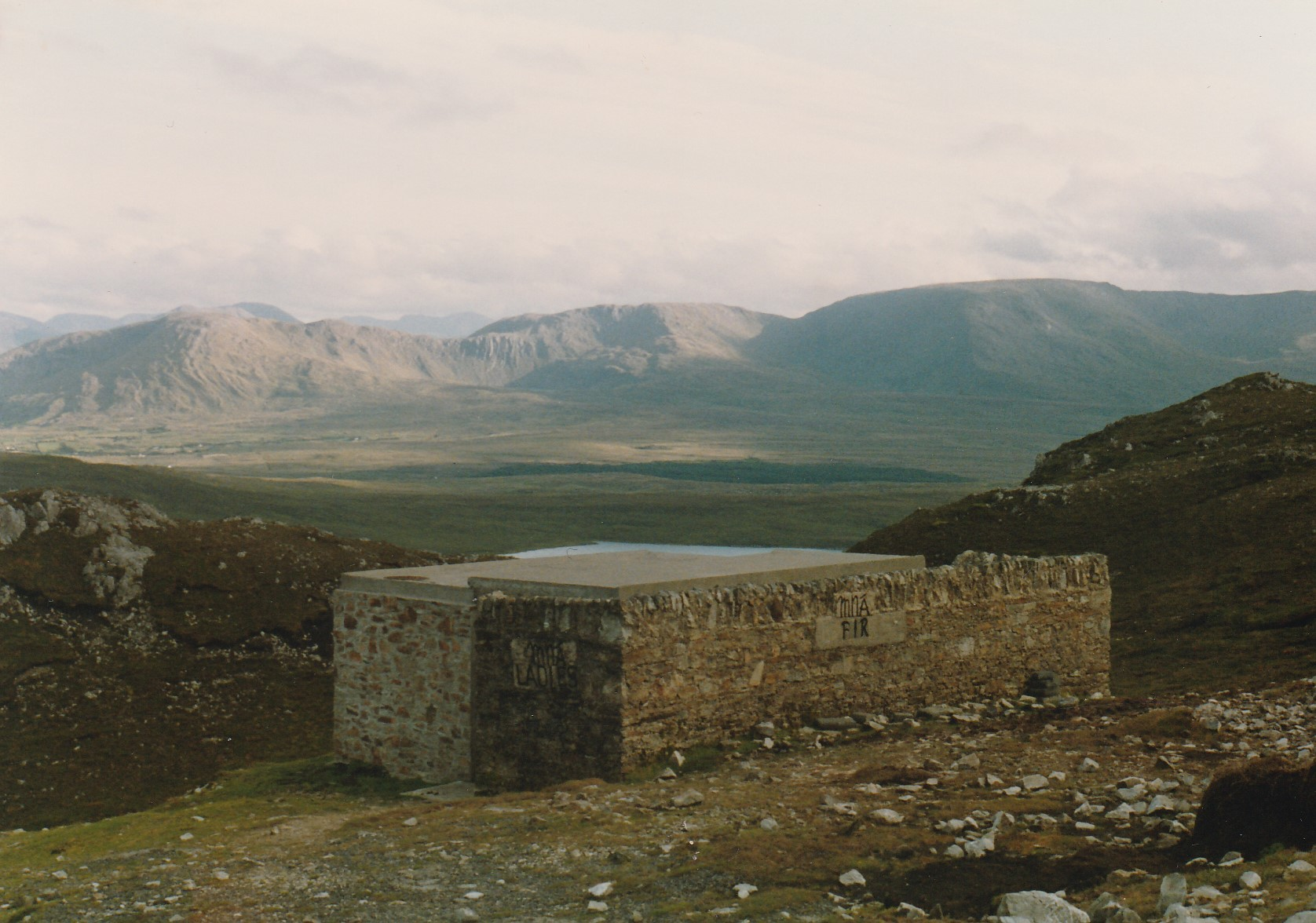
Toilets on the mountain in 1993 (The Sheeffry Hills in the background)

== See also ==
- Lists of mountains in Ireland
- List of mountains of the British Isles by height
- List of P600 mountains in the British Isles
- List of Marilyns in the British Isles
- List of Hewitt mountains in England, Wales and Ireland

== Bibliography ==
- Harry Hughes (2010). Croagh Patrick. A Place of Pilgrimage. A Place of Beauty. O'Brien Press. ISBN 9781847171986.
- Leo Morahan (2001). Croagh Patrick, Co. Mayo: archaeology, landscape and people. Westport: Croagh Patrick Archaeological Committee. ISBN 0-9536086-3-8.
