= Knocknadobar =

Mountain in Kerry, Ireland

- Cnoc na dTobar
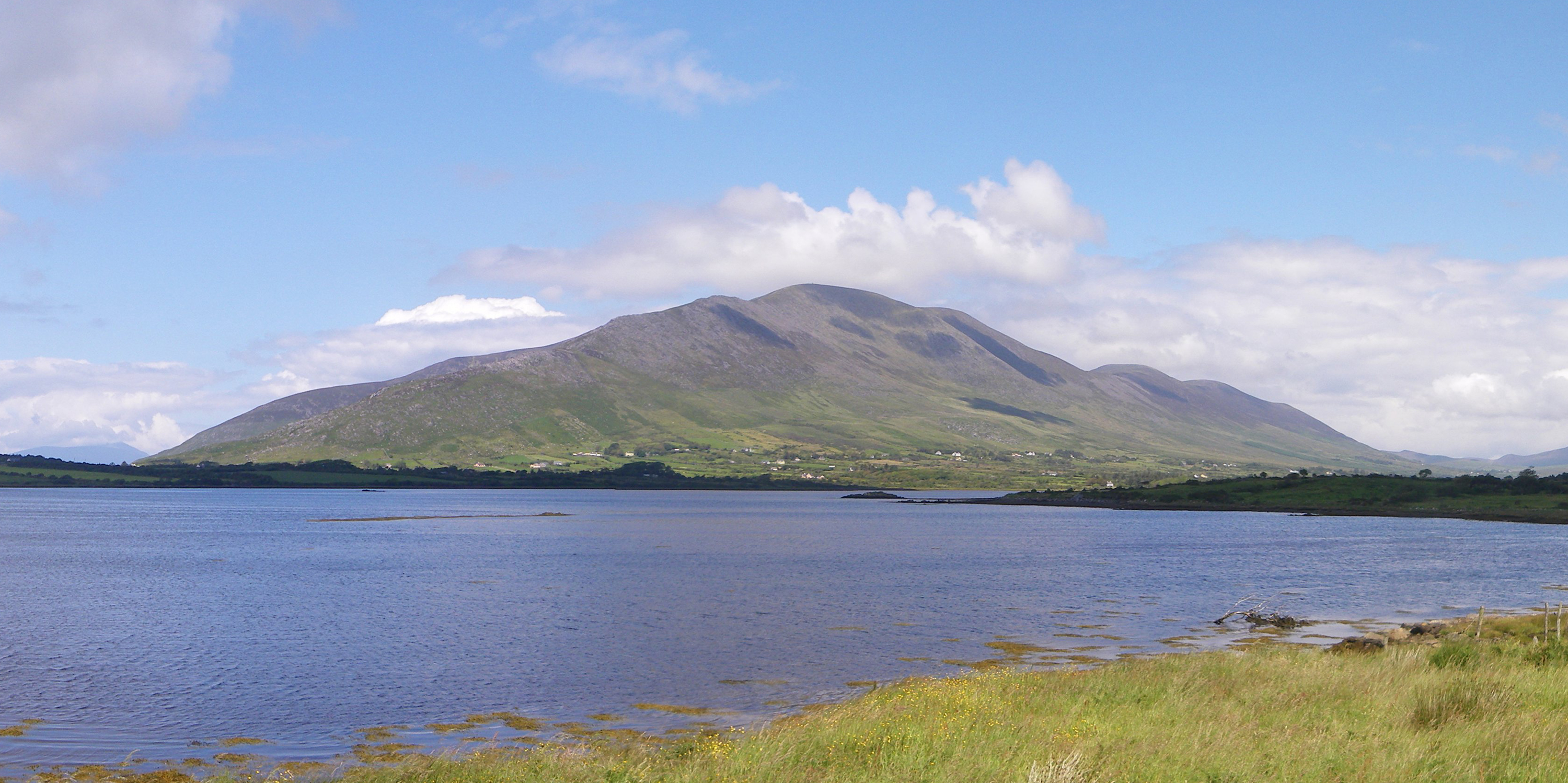

Highest point
- Elevation: 690 m (2,260 ft)
- Prominence: 565 m (1,854 ft)
- Listing: Marilyn, Hewitt, Arderin, Simm, Vandeleur-Lynam
- Coordinates: 51.99302°N 10.175489°W

Naming
- English translation: hill of the wells
- Language of name: Irish

Geography
- Location within Ireland
- Location: County Kerry, Ireland
- Parent range: Mountains of the Iveragh Peninsula
- OSI/OSNI grid: V506845

Geology
- Mountain type(s): Purple sandstone & siltstone

Knocknadobar (Irish: Cnoc na dTobar, meaning 'hill of the Wells') at 690 metres (2,260 ft), is the 102nd–highest peak in Ireland on the Arderin scale, and the 123rd–highest peak in Ireland according to the Vandeleur-Lynam scale. Knocknadobar is one of the main mountains of the Iveragh Peninsula in County Kerry, Ireland, and has been one of the most important sites of pilgrimage in Ireland since medieval times.

== Naming ==
Knocknadobar means "hill of the wells". The mountain is in south-west corner of Ireland standing against the prevailing south-west winds carrying rain from the North Atlantic; thus Knocknadobar absorbs significant water, and in places, freshwater literally springs out of the ground like a Well. There are holy wells at the base of the Mountain, most notably St. Fursey's Holy Well, which has been a site of pilgrimage since medieval times, dedicated to Saint Fursey (c 597–650 AD). Paul Tempan notes that St. Fursey's Holy Well was noted as a cure for eye complaints.

== Geography ==
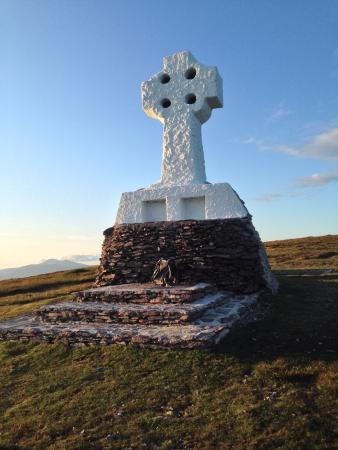
Summit cross

Knocknadobar is northeast of Cahersiveen, and north of the N70 road, on the coast of Dingle Bay. Knocknadobar is an almost "stand-alone" mountain, and thus its 690 m (2,264 ft) in height, translates into 565 m (1,854 ft) of prominence, qualifying it to meet the British Isles Marilyn classification. Knocknadobar also meets the Arderin, Simm and Hewitt classifications. Knocknadobar ranks as the 32nd-highest mountain in Ireland on the MountainViews Online Database, 100 Highest Irish Mountains, where the prominence threshold is over 100 metres.

== Pilgrimage ==
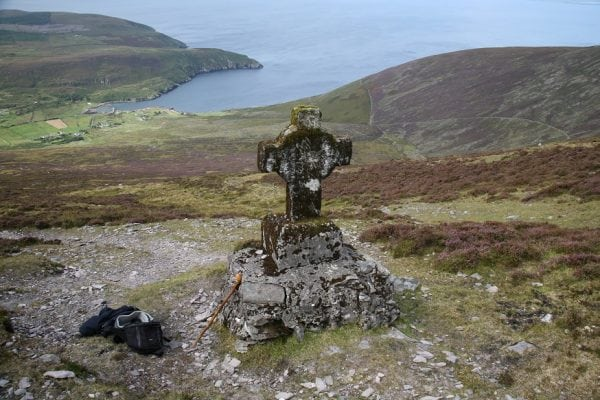
Station of the cross

Cnoc na dTobar is noted as an ancient pilgrim mountain. Even before Christian times, in the 5th-century, the Knocknadobar was a place of celebrations for Celtic Lúghnasa Festivals in August. Lúgh (pronounced Loo) was the god of the Harvest, and festivals or dancing and merriment were held on high ground to make offerings for a good harvest, and Knocknatobar's wide flat summit provided a suitable venue. The word for August in the Irish language is "Lúhgnasa" (pronounced in English as "Luanasa"). In 1884–85, Christian crosses were placed along on the ancient pilgrim trail to represent the 14 Stations of the Cross, and an altar and a large Celtic cross was placed at the top where mass is said yearly; these works were undertaken by Canon Brosnan of Cahersiveen.

The full Cnock na dTobar Pilgrimage Path takes circa 3.5 hours to complete the 9-kilometre route, and is part of the National Pilgrim Passport scheme run by Pilgrim Paths of Ireland. The flat summit offers views of other major pilgrimage sites: Mount Brandon, and Skellig Michael.

== Books ==
- MountainViews (Simon Stewart) (2013). A Guide to Ireland's Mountain Summits: The Vandeleur-Lynams & the Arderins. Collins Books. ISBN 978-1-84889-164-7.
- Dillion, Paddy (1993). The Mountains of Ireland: A Guide to Walking the Summits. Cicerone. ISBN 978-1852841102.

== See also ==
- Drung Hill
- Lists of mountains in Ireland
- List of mountains of the British Isles by height
- List of Marilyns in the British Isles
- List of Hewitt mountains in England, Wales and Ireland
- Lists of long-distance trails in the Republic of Ireland
