= Wicklow Way =

Walking trail in County Wicklow, Ireland

The Wicklow Way (Slí Cualann Nua)
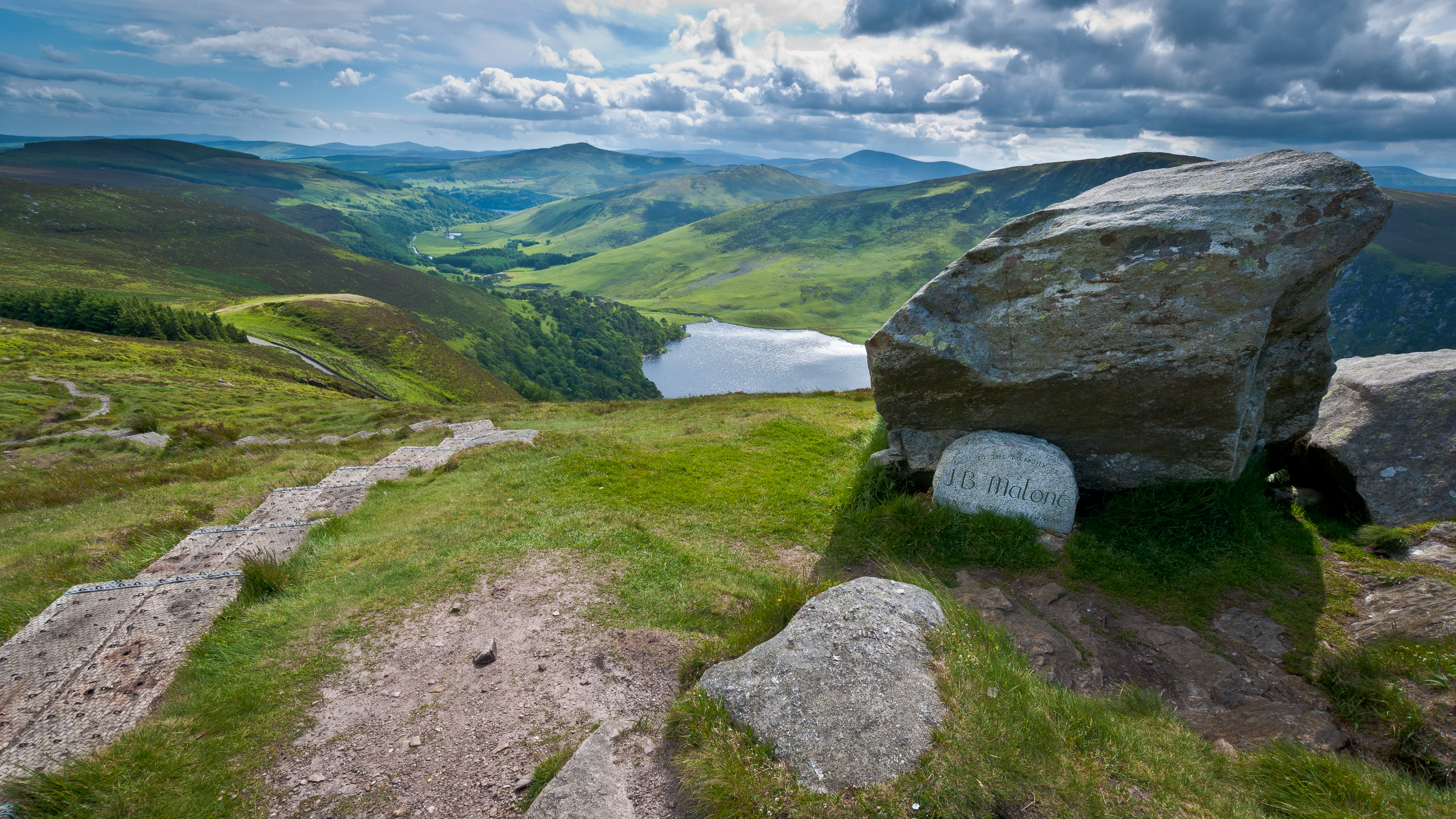
- The J. B. Malone memorial at Barr Rock on the Wicklow Way overlooking Lough Tay.
- Length: 131 kilometres (81 miles)
- Location: Eastern Ireland
- Designation: National Waymarked Trail
- Trailheads: Marlay Park, County Dublin; Clonegal, County Carlow
- Use: Hiking
- Elevation gain/loss: 3,320 m (10,892 ft)
- Highest point: White Hill (630 m (2,067 ft))
- Lowest point: Clonegal (60 m (197 ft))
- Difficulty: Strenuous
- Season: Any
- Sights: Wicklow Mountains; Glendalough
- Surface: Forestry tracks, roads, boreens and mountain paths
- Website: www.irishtrails.ie

Map overview
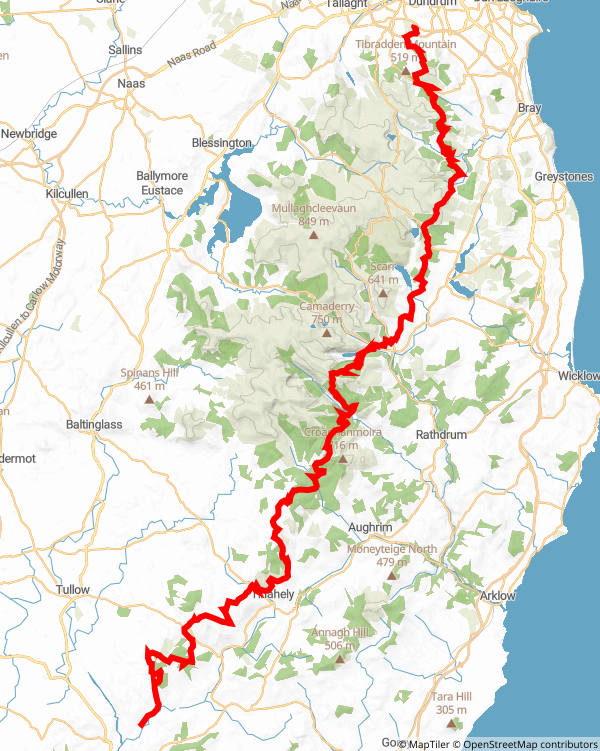

The Wicklow Way (Irish: Slí Cualann Nua, meaning 'New Cuala Way') is a 131-kilometre (81-mile) long-distance trail that crosses the Wicklow Mountains in Ireland. It runs from Marlay Park in the southern suburbs of Dublin through County Wicklow and ends in the village of Clonegal in County Carlow. It is designated as a National Waymarked Trail by the Irish Sports Council and is waymarked by posts with a yellow "walking man" symbol and a directional arrow. Typically completed in 5–7 days, it is one of the busiest of Ireland's National Waymarked Trails, with up to 24,000 people a year walking the most popular sections. The Way is also used regularly by a number of mountain running competitions.

The trail follows forest tracks, mountain paths, boreens and quiet country roads. Mountains, upland lakes and steep-sided glacial valleys make up the terrain of the initial northern sections of the Way before giving way to gentler rolling foothills in the latter southern sections. Much of the route follows the contact point between the igneous granite of the western side of Wicklow and the metamorphic schists and slates of the eastern side. The principal habitat of the upland sections is a mixture of broadleaf and coniferous woodland, heath and blanket bog while in the lowland sections the hedgerows marking the boundaries between fields support a variety of wildlife. The Way also passes the Monastic City at Glendalough, founded in the 6th century by Saint Kevin.

The Wicklow Way was originally proposed by J. B. Malone in a series of newspaper articles in 1966. In 1977, Malone was appointed to the Long Distance Walking Routes Committee of Cospoir, the National Sports Council, and set about making the concept a reality. Malone's original proposal for a circular route around Wicklow was dropped in favour of the linear route that exists today because the Government wanted the Wicklow Way to form part of a network of walking routes around the country. The first section opened in 1980 and the trail was fully completed in 1982. While the Ulster Way was the first waymarked trail for walkers in all of Ireland, the Wicklow Way became the first of many National Waymarked Trails to be developed in the Republic of Ireland: there are now over forty such trails, covering a distance of over 4,000 kilometres (2,500 miles). The Way forms part of European walking route E8 which stretches from the Atlantic coast of County Cork to Istanbul in Turkey. A memorial to J. B. Malone, who died in 1989, was erected on the Wicklow Way, near Lough Tay, in honour of his contribution.

The provision of and access to the routes through the countryside used by the Wicklow Way is dependent on agreement with local authorities and landowners. Accordingly the route has been criticised for excessive use of routes through forestry plantations and roads. Proposals to address these issues were put forward in a review of the National Waymarked Trails published in 2010.

== History ==
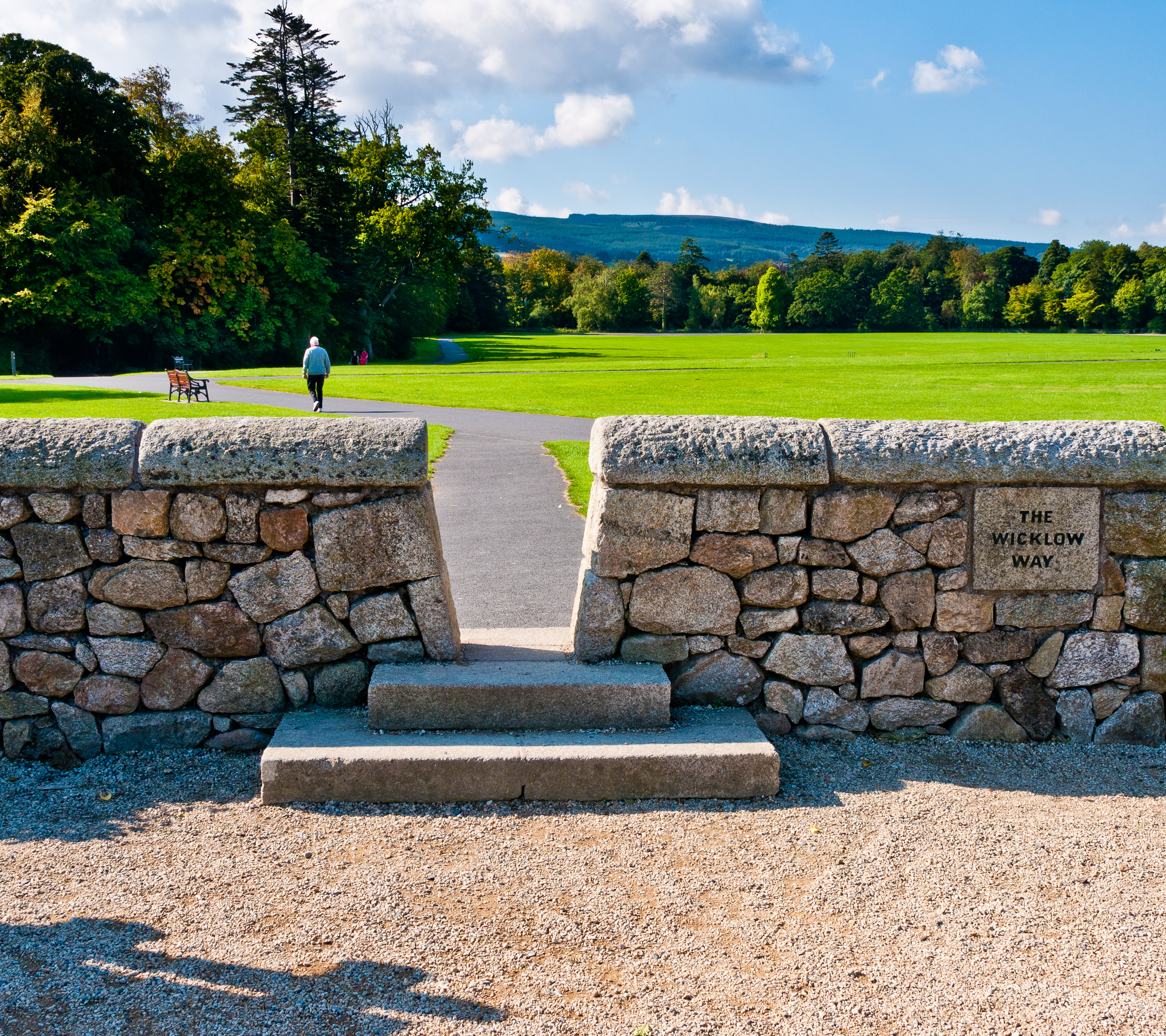
Marlay Park

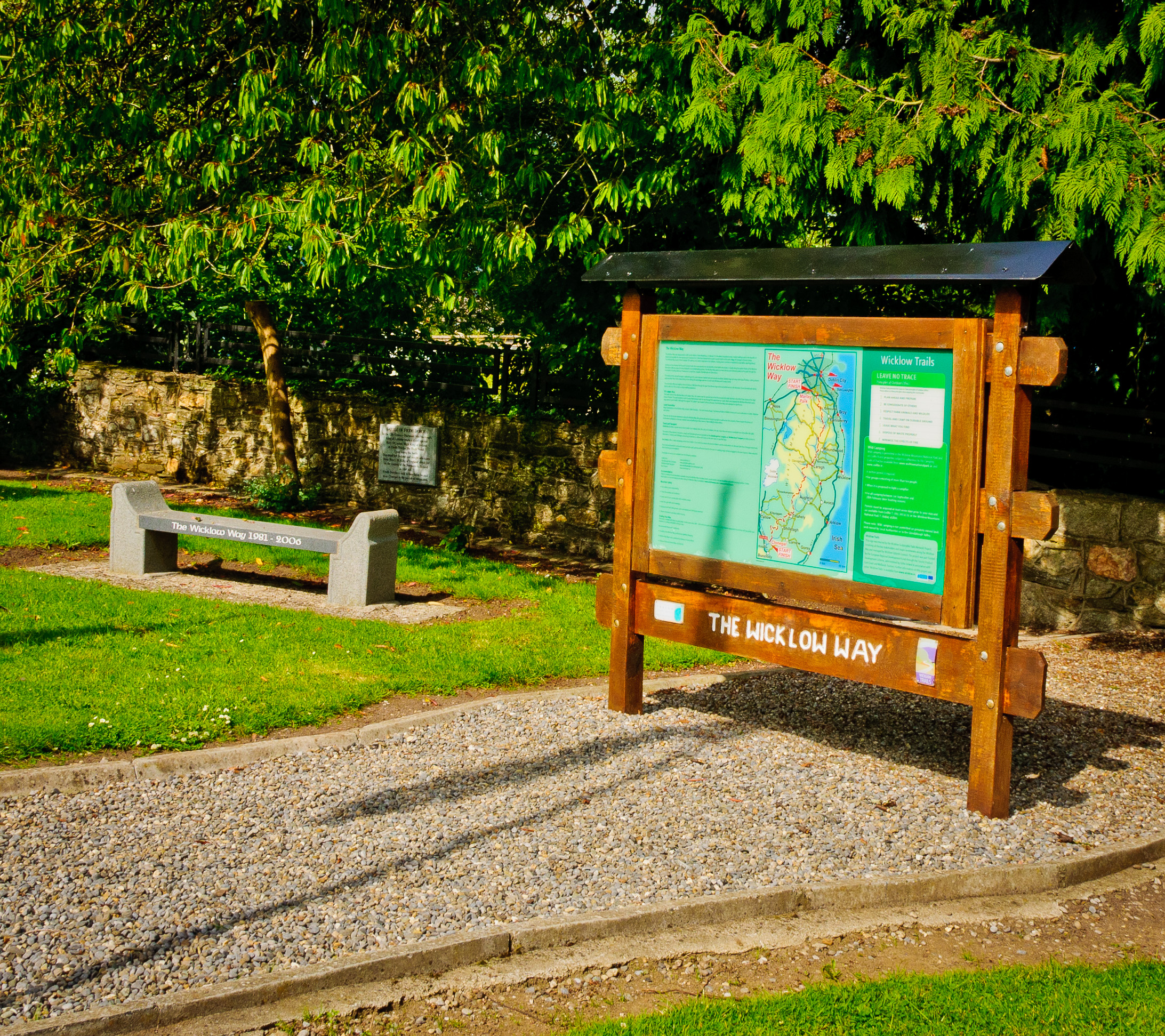
Clonegal

Trailheads of the Wicklow Way

The concept of a long-distance trail through County Wicklow was first published by J. B. Malone (1914–1989) in a series of newspaper articles in 1966. Malone had a regular column on walking in Wicklow in the Evening Herald newspaper and had published two books – The Open Road (1950) and Walking in Wicklow (1964) – on the subject as well as contributing to the RTÉ television series Mountain and Meadow (1962). He proposed a circular route, dubbed "The Twelve Days of Wicklow", which he considered to be "a journey comparable to that along the celebrated "Pennine Way" but I would say more varied than its north British counterpart". The route consisted of twelve stages, beginning at Bohernabreena, near Tallaght, Dublin 24, and ending at Stepaside, County Dublin, as follows: Bohernabreena to Baltyboys (near Valleymount), via Athdown; Baltyboys to Ballinclea (near Donard), via Hollywood; Ballinclea to Aghavannagh, via Lugnaquilla summit; a rest day at Aghavannagh; Aghavannagh to Tinahely; a circular day route beginning and ending in Tinahely, via Shillelagh; Tinahely to Avoca; Avoca to Glenmalure, via Greenan; Glenmalure to Glendalough; a rest day at Glendalough; Glendalough to Knockree; and Knockree to Stepaside.

In 1977, Malone was appointed by John Bruton, Parliamentary Secretary to the Minister for Education, to a committee to develop rural pathways within the Republic of Ireland. This evolved into the Long Distance Walking Routes Committee (LDWRC) of Cospóir, the National Sports Council, where Malone, acting as Field Officer, set about developing a scheme for a "Wicklow Way" along the lines of what he had proposed twelve years earlier. The Irish Government's decision to develop a series of walking routes was prompted in response to the development of the Ulster Way in Northern Ireland in the 1970s. Malone's original concept of a circular route returning to Dublin via West Wicklow was dropped in favour of the linear path between Marlay Park and Clonegal that exists today, mainly because the Government wanted the Wicklow Way to form part of national network of trails to cover Ireland. Issues regarding access were another reason. Nevertheless, the route remains substantially as planned in 1966. In developing the route, the LDWRC made use of many existing paths, tracks and forest roads but, having no compulsory powers to include any of these, the provision of and access to such routes was, and continues to be, achieved by agreement with local authorities and landowners.

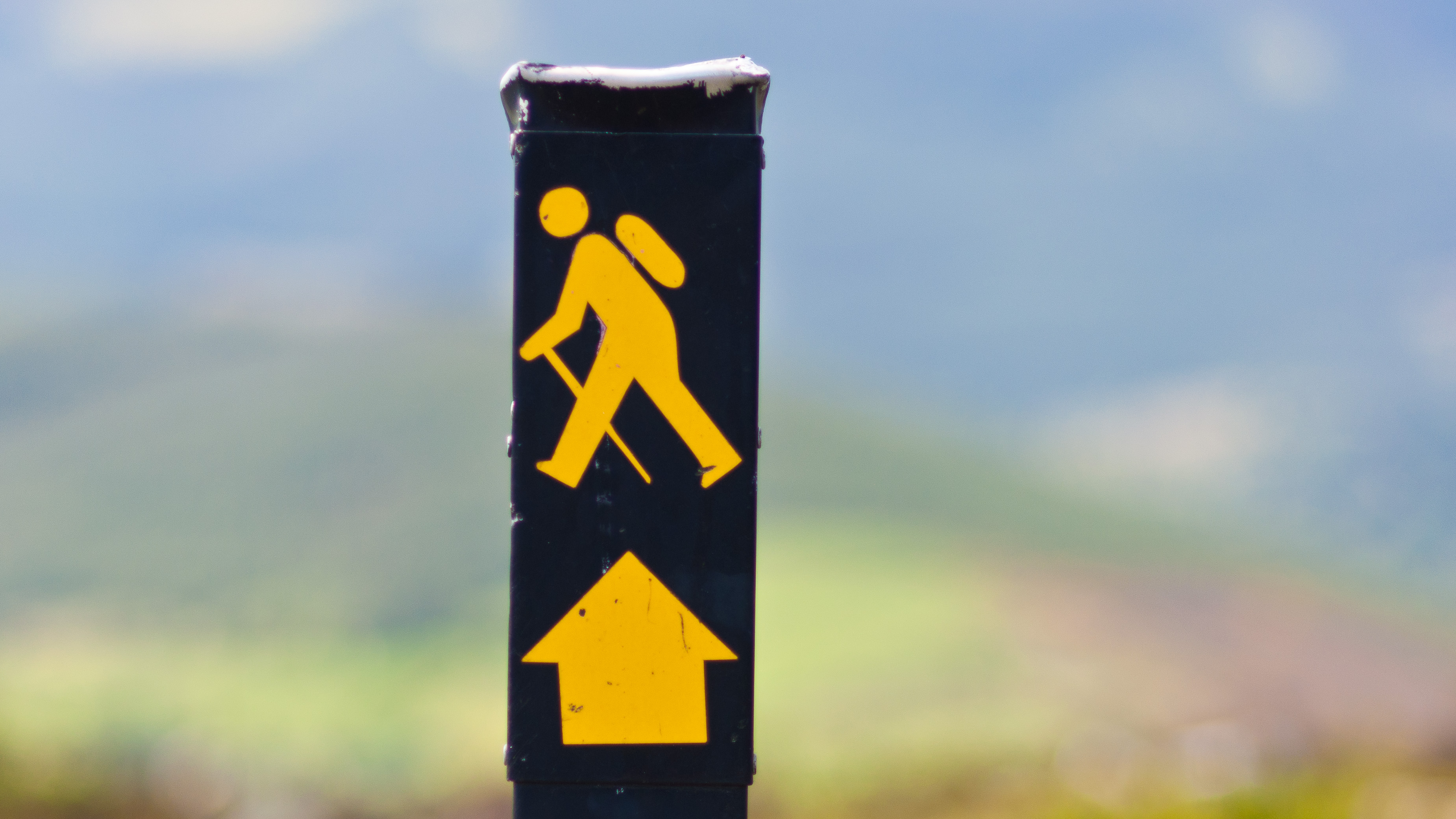
"Walking man" waymarker on the Wicklow Way

The first section of the Way – from Marlay Park to Luggala – was opened by Jim Tunney, Minister of State at the Department of Education, on 15 August 1980. The second section – from Luggala to Moyne – was opened by Michael Keating, Minister of State at the Department of Education, on 27 September 1981. The final stretch as far as Clonegal was completed in 1982. The Irish name of the Wicklow Way – Slí Cualann Nua – is not a literal translation but means 'New Cuala Way', a reference to the Slí Cualann, one of five ancient routes that radiated from the Hill of Tara that ran through the land of Cuala (modern-day Wicklow).

The route of the Wicklow Way has been altered on a number of occasions since opening in 1980, generally as a result of problems with erosion or difficulties with rights of way. For instance, concerns about erosion led to the Way being diverted away from Fairy Castle, the summit of Two Rock mountain. Similarly, the Way was also diverted away from the summit of Mullacor, which at 657 metres (2,156 feet) was the highest point on the Way before the trail was rerouted. In 1999, the Way was diverted away from the village of Laragh on foot of an objection by a local landowner, to the chagrin of businesses in the village dependent on the custom of walking tourists. A number of information boards and stone landmarks were erected in 2006 to mark the 25th anniversary of the opening of the Way. The state-owned forestry company Coillte has in recent years worked with a number of tourism and voluntary bodies to upgrade sections of the Way that run through its lands. Today, the Wicklow Way is managed by the Wicklow Outdoor Recreation Committee.

The Wicklow Way was the second waymarked way to be opened in Ireland, and the first waymarked way to be opened in the Republic of Ireland. The LDWRC (now the National Trails Advisory Committee of the Irish Sports Council) went on to develop many more long distance walking routes, the intention at the time being to develop a walking route around Ireland. There are now more than forty National Waymarked Trails, comprising over 4,000 kilometres (2,500 miles) of trails in Ireland.

== Usage and criticism ==
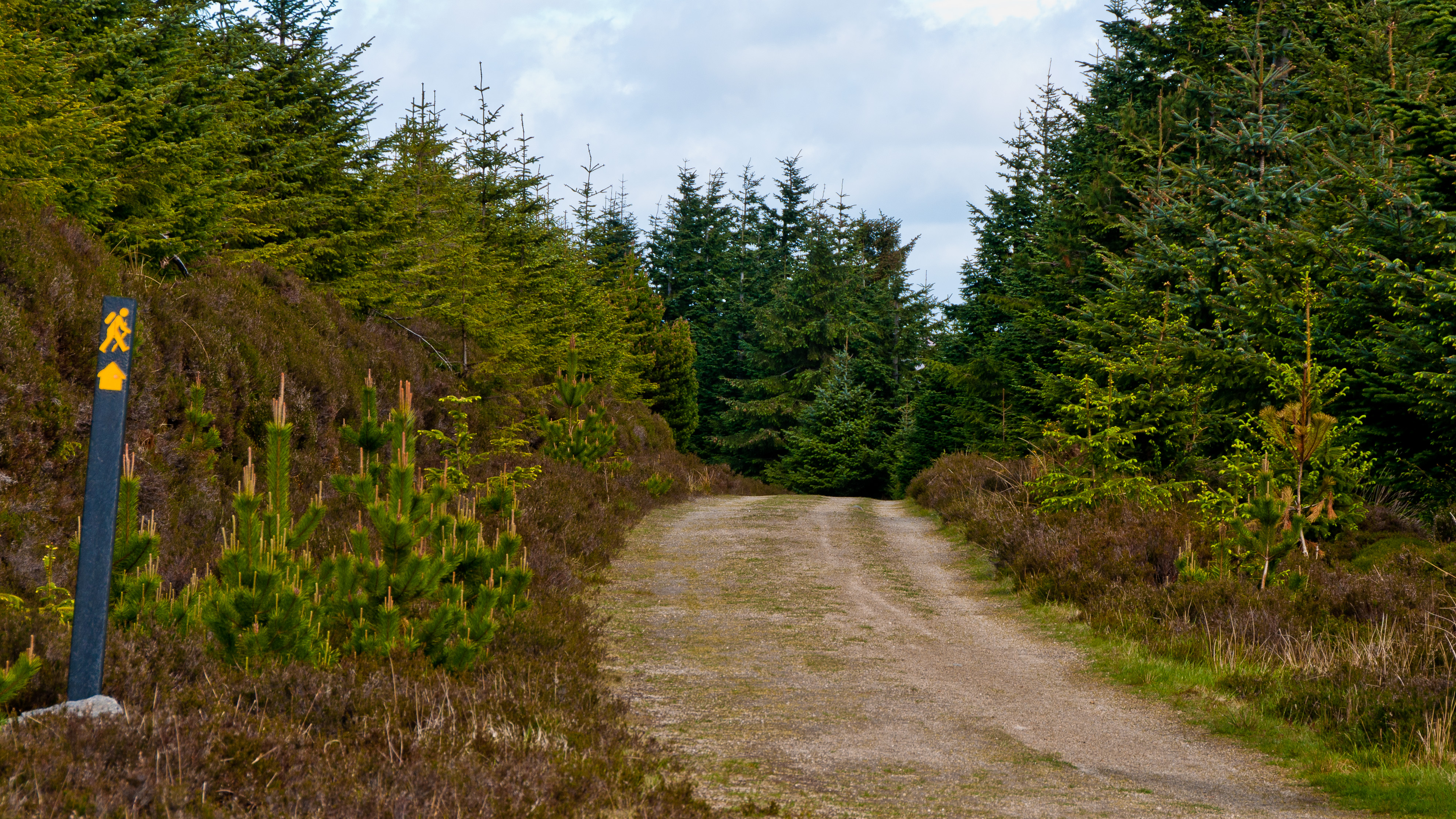
The Wicklow Way has been criticised for its monotonous forest paths

On account of being the second waymarked way to be developed in all of Ireland and also on account of its proximity to Dublin, the Wicklow Way is one of the most popular of Ireland's National Waymarked Trails. It has, however, been subject to some criticisms. Since access to lands along the Way is on a permissive basis, much of the walk (41 km (25 mi)) is on tarred country roads, is highly dependent on access provided by the state, (57 km (35 mi) is on land owned by Coillte and 16 km (10 mi) is on land owned by the Wicklow Mountains National Park) and covers a relatively small amount of private land (13 km (8 mi)). Most of the road walking is confined to the southernmost section of the Way, between Tinahely and Clonegal, where some 63% of the route is on roads. Research by the Wicklow Uplands Council showed that while up to 24,000 people a year walk along the busiest sections, this number falls to under 2,500 a year on the stretches south of Glenmalure.

The extensive use of forest roads through conifer plantations has been another criticism: the authors of the Lonely Planet guidebook, Walking in Ireland, found, "The Way's one shortcoming is the character of the walking [...] you'll become all too familiar with forest tracks and roads through conifer plantations [...] where they're surrounded by tall, dense forest they're not particularly interesting". Similarly, Paul Gosling, who walked the Way for The Independent, found that, "While the long distance path is, on occasion, very attractive, it is not so much hazardous as unadventurous. [...] Over the next four and a half days, we lost our enthusiasm for conifers [...] The views were restricted and there was little sign of wildlife". In The Irish Times, John G. O'Dwyer described them as "gloomy trails through invading armies of monoculture [...] as memorable as a motorway median".

A review of the National Waymarked Trails in the Republic of Ireland by the National Trails Office in 2010 acknowledged these shortcomings and recommended that the Wicklow Way be selected as one of fourteen trails to be upgraded to a National Long Distance Trail. This is a proposed new standard of trail in Ireland, intended to meet international standards for outstanding trails. It would require sections on unsuitable roads to comprise less than 10% of the total trail and for appropriate support services – accommodation, meals, transport, luggage transfer etc. – to be available. The review also recommended the development of shorter looped walks off the Wicklow Way and improving parking facilities.

== Route ==
The Wicklow Way is waymarked in both directions and can be started at Marlay Park or Clonegal. The trail is marked with square black posts with an image, in yellow, of a walking man and a directional arrow. This image, copied from the symbol used for waymarking the Ulster Way, has become the traditional waymarking symbol for all of the National Waymarked Trails in Ireland. Brown fingerposts are used on sections that follow roads. The Way is typically completed in five to seven days.

=== Marlay Park to Knockree ===
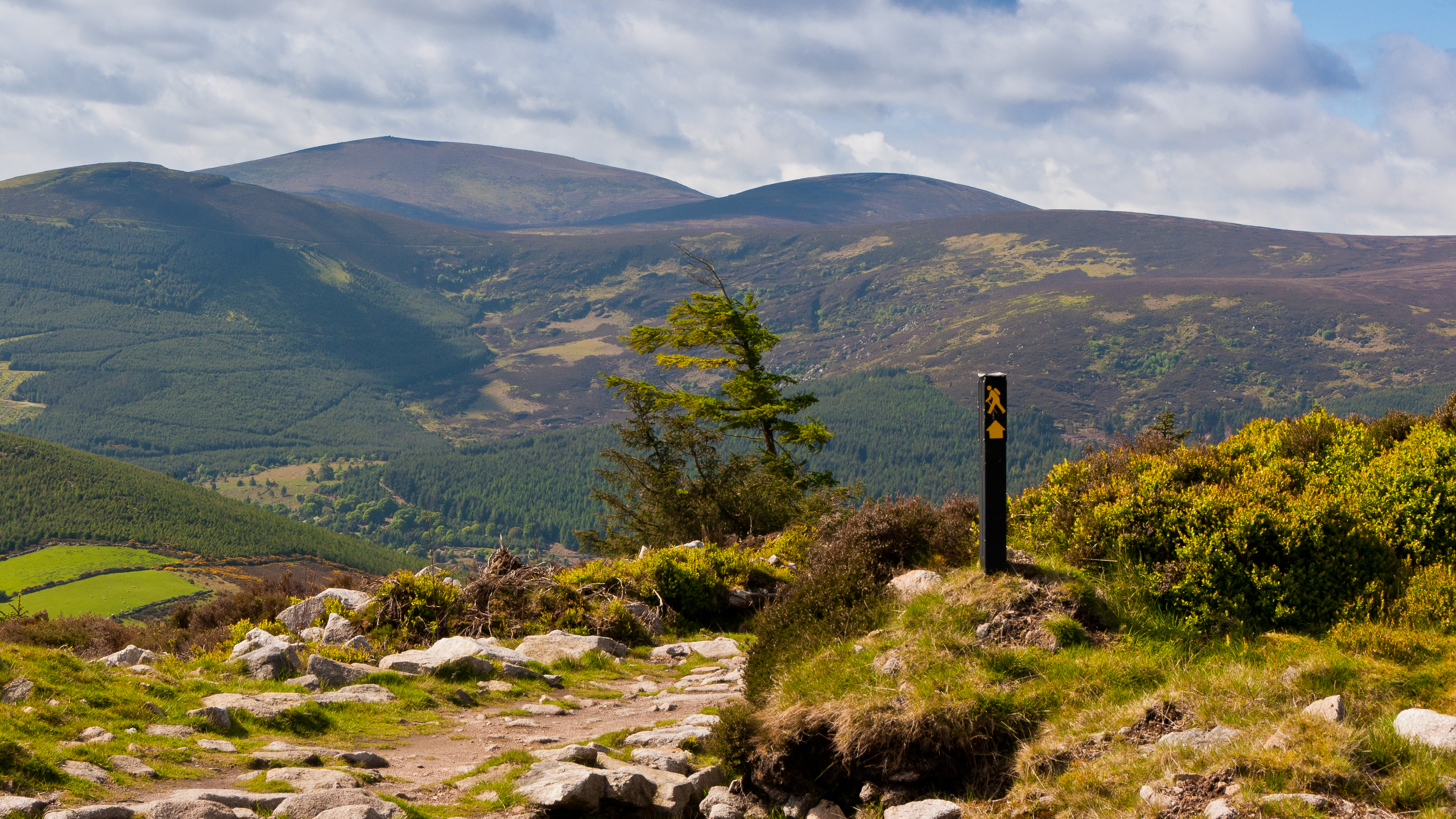
The Wicklow Way at Curtlestown where it enters Glencree valley

If travelling in a North-South direction, the Wicklow Way begins in Marlay Park, a historic demesne on the outskirts of Dublin's suburbs laid out in the late 18th century by the La Touches, a family of Huguenot merchants and bankers, and later developed as a public park. The trailhead comprises a map board, beside which is a low wall with a stone stile through which walkers pass in order to make their first step on the trail. The Way traverses the park, following a wooded shelterbelt along the Little Dargle River, before emerging on the southern side of the park onto College Road. Passing under the M50 motorway, it ascends Kilmashogue Lane and enters the forest recreation area on Kilmashogue mountain. This is the first of many forest plantations, owned by Coillte, that the Wicklow Way passes through. The tree species in this area comprise Sitka spruce, Scots pine and beech. Much of this initial section of the Way is underlain by granite. The trail circles the mountain, emerging onto open moorland near Fairy Castle. This upland heath and bog habitat is dominated by heather, purple moor grass and bog cotton and supports many bird species, including red grouse, meadow pipit and skylark. The Way crosses a saddle between Two Rock mountain and Kilmashogue before descending from a broad ridge between Two Rock and Tibradden Mountain into the valley of Glencullen where it follows the R116 road to the hamlet of Boranaraltry. The road is flanked by hedgerow-bordered farmland. Ascending from Boranaraltry, the trail crests the shoulder of Prince William's Seat, at which point the Way leaves County Dublin and enters County Wicklow. The habitat here alternates between blanket bog and upland heath. The trail descends to the floor of the Glencree valley via Curtlestown Wood where it then enters Lackan Wood and crosses the shoulder of Knockree Hill.

=== Knockree to Oldbridge ===
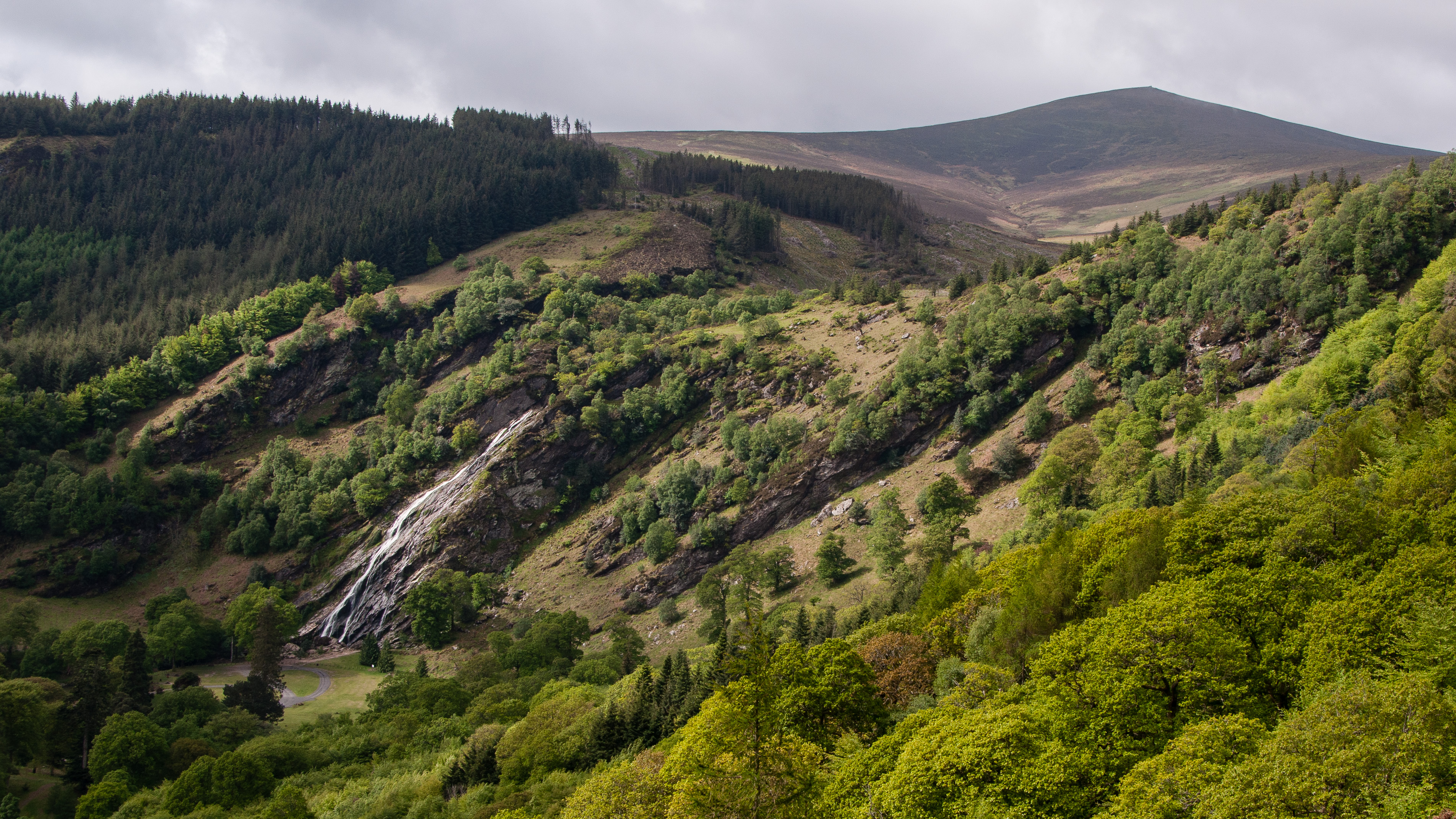
Powerscourt Deerpark and Waterfall with Djouce mountain in the distance as seen from Ride Rock along the Wicklow Way

From Knockree on to Clonegal, much of the Way follows the contact point between the granite of the western part of the Wicklow Mountains and the schists and slates of the east. The trail follows the Glencree River through Seskin Wood, a semi-natural oak and hazel woodland and a habitat for jays. Crossing the river at a footbridge, the trail then passes into Crone Woods and ascends to Ride Rock, which overlooks Powerscourt Deerpark and the Powerscourt Waterfall, the tallest in Ireland at 121 metres (397 feet). Deer – hybrids of imported Japanese Sika and native Red deer – are common in the forests and mountains along the Wicklow Way and all deer in the Wicklow Mountains originated with the Powerscourt herd. The next valley to be crossed is Glensoulan which, although uninhabited today, before the Great Famine of the 1840s was home to a small population of cottiers and faint traces of their farms can still be seen in the wintertime when the bracken is low. Crossing the River Dargle, the trail ascends the eastern shoulder of Djouce mountain. Here, the heathland gives way to wetter blanket bog. Bogland shares a number of plant and animal species with heathland but is also a habitat for species of bog cotton as well as bog asphodel, sedges (which contribute to the formation of peat) and bog moss. The wet bogland is also a habitat for frogs, pondskaters and diving beetles. Near the summit of Djouce, the Way joins a wooden tóchar or bog bridge, constructed to protect the bog from erosion, which crosses White Hill, the highest point on the Way at 630 metres (2,067 feet). The trail descends White Hill towards Luggala along a ridge, known as the Barr, where a memorial stone to J. B. Malone, carved by sculptor Billy Gannon and erected in 1990, may be found overlooking Lough Tay. From Luggala, the trail passes through a coniferous plantation of spruce and pine on the eastern flanks of Sleamaine and Ballinafunshoge Hills to reach Oldbridge, which crosses the River Avonmore near Lough Dan.

=== Oldbridge to Glendalough ===
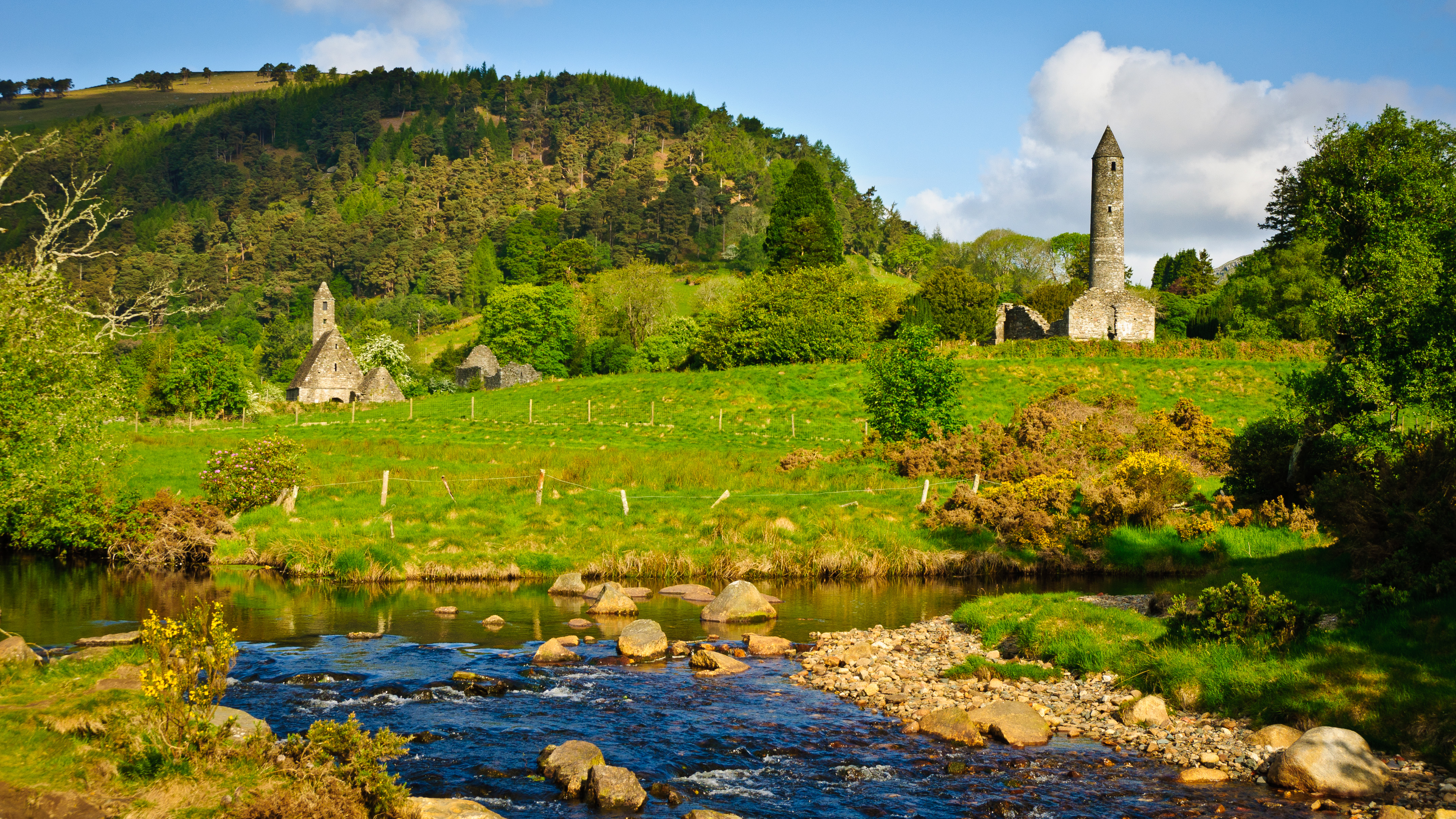
The Wicklow Way passes the ancient Monastic City at Glendalough

Leaving Oldbridge, the Way follows the road for approximately 4 kilometres (2 miles) before turning onto a boreen. To the left of the boreen is Wart Stone Field, so called on account of a bullaun stone that lies in the field, water from which is said to cure warts. The boreen ends at Brusher Gap, reputed to be a place where locals left food and supplies for Michael Dwyer and his followers when they went on the run after the 1798 Rebellion. The Way enters Drummin forest, a sitka spruce plantation, where it passes an Adirondack shelter, constructed by Mountain Meitheal, a volunteer group dedicated to trail preservation that has upgraded various sections of the Wicklow Way over the years. The trail climbs Paddock Hill before descending into a plantation of larch trees. The forest floor here is a habitat for spurges, heath bedstraw and fly agaric toadstools. The trail crosses the Military Road, near Laragh, and then a wooden footbridge across the Glenmacnass River. A dense spread of granite boulders litters the riverbed, glacial erratics deposited by melting glaciers at the end of the last ice age. This stretch of the trail follows an old mass path through a woodland of many native Irish tree species, including oak, rowan, silver birch and willow, carpeted with a forest floor of bilberry, bluebell and hard fern. The Way continues along forest tracks over the shoulder of Brockagh Mountain. At the highest point there is a vista over the Vale of Glendalough with the two lakes nestled in the shelter of Camaderry and Derrybawn Mountains. Exiting the forest, the Way reaches the R756 road and the Glendalough visitor centre. Crossing the Glendasan River, it passes the remains of the Monastic City, founded in the 6th century by Saint Kevin.

=== Glendalough to Iron Bridge ===
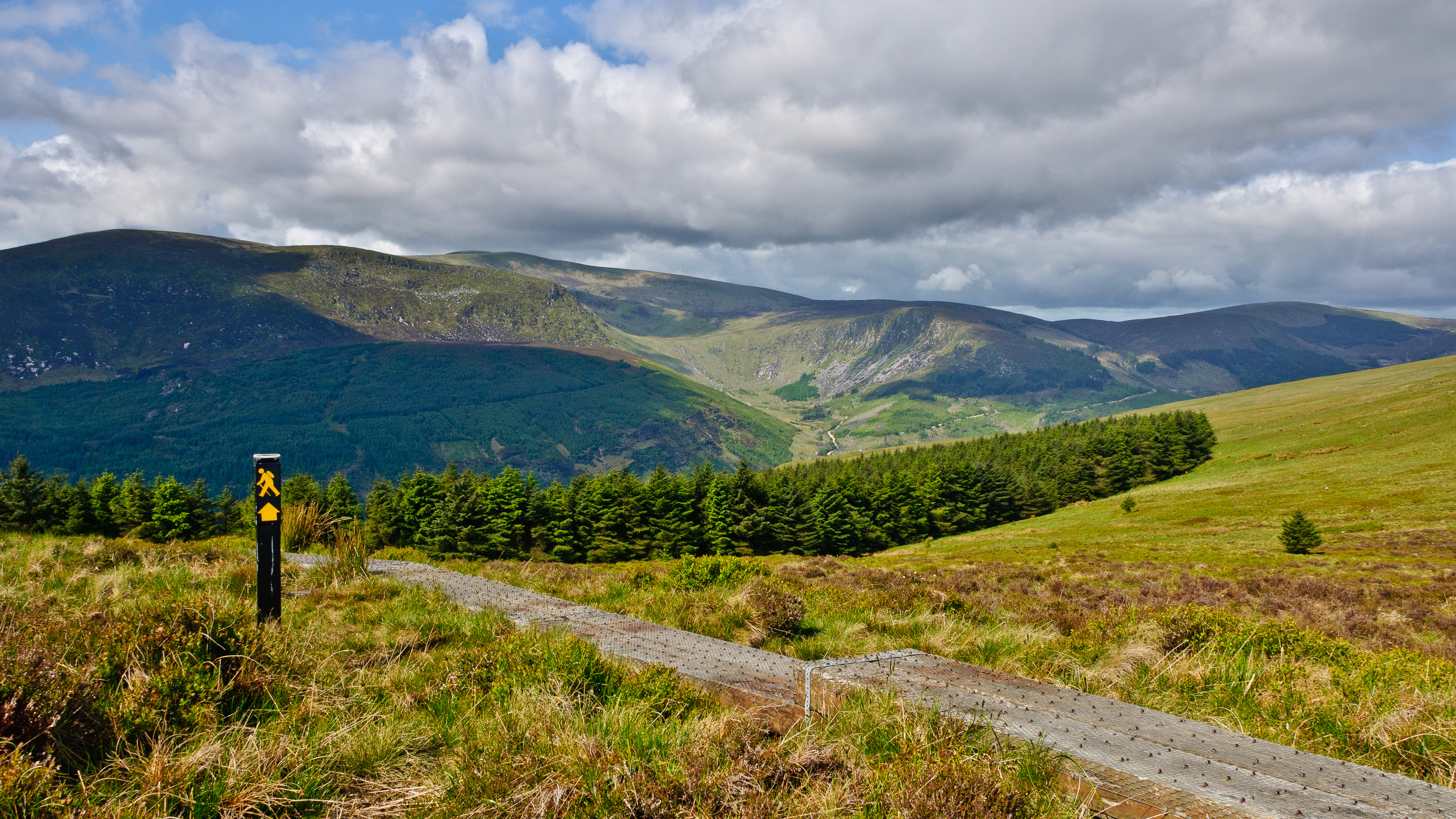
Lugnaquilla, Wicklow's highest mountain, seen as the Wicklow Way descends into Glenmalure

Most of this stretch of the trail is on forest roads. From the Monastic City at Glendalough, the Way follows the Green Road towards the Upper Lake. It passes through an area of native woodland made up of oak, holly, birch, and rowan. Ascending from the Upper Lake, the trail reaches Poulanass Waterfall which, over millennia, has cut a narrow gorge through the slate rock and borne millions of tonnes of rock, sand and mud into Glendalough, dividing what was originally one lake into the two seen today. The trail continues its ascent through forest before emerging onto the saddle between Mullacor and Lugduff mountains at Borenacrow. The Borenacrow route between Glendalough and Glenmalure dates back to ancient times and there is a local tradition that Saint Kevin travelled this way to celebrate Mass in Glenmalure. The view ahead looks across the Glenmalure valley at Fraughan Rock Glen and Lugnaquilla, Wicklow's highest mountain at 925 metres (3,035 feet). The Way then begins a long descent into Glenmalure, the longest glacial valley in Ireland and Great Britain. Along the way the trail passes another Adirondack shelter, constructed in 2006 by Mountain Meitheal. Reaching the floor of the valley, the Way joins the Military Road to reach Drumgoff Crossroads. Crossing the River Avonbeg, the route passes the remains of an old military barracks, built around 1800, and enters Drumgoff Wood. At the forest entrance is a granite pillar marking the official halfway point of the Wicklow Way. The trail follows a forest road along the flanks of Slieve Maan before briefly re-joining the Military Road and then following a forest road around Carrickashane Mountain before reaching the road at Iron Bridge where the Way crosses the Ow River. Another Adirondack shelter, again constructed by Mountain Meitheal volunteers with assistance from the Glenwalk Hillwalking Club, can be found at Mucklagh, on the slopes of Carrickashane Mountain.

=== Iron Bridge to Derry River ===
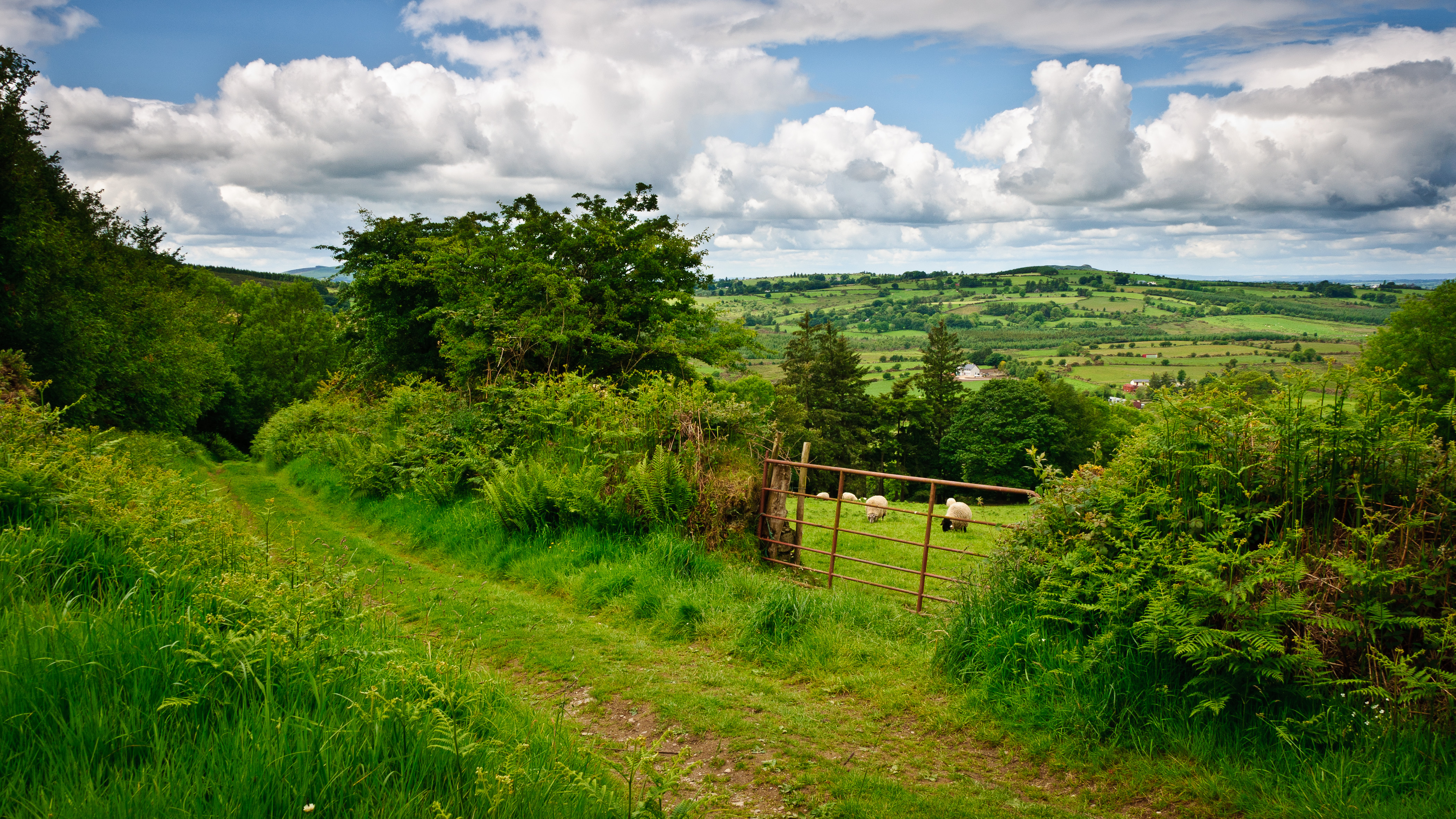
The character of the Wicklow Way changes from high mountains to low rolling hills in the southern sections

After Iron Bridge, the character of the Way changes with the steeper hills of the earlier sections giving way to a gentler gradient that meanders between low hills. These latter sections also contain a great deal of road walking as the Way crosses farmland via minor roads and boreens.

Hedgerows of hawthorn and blackthorn, which form the boundaries between the fields, are the principal habitat in these cultivated areas. They support many species of wild flowers, insects and birds, including dog rose, purple foxglove and wild violet as well as wrens, blackbirds and song thrushes.

The Way ascends through a gap between Ballygobban and Shielstown Hills, yielding views stretching from Lugnaquilla to Keadeen Mountain and beyond to Eagle Hill and the Castlecomer Plateau. The hills ahead mark the edge of the granite backbone of the Wicklow Mountains; in the distance they gradually merge with the Blackstairs Mountains, which can be seen on the skyline. The trail follows the road passing close to the village of Moyne before joining a boreen. Along this boreen are the remains of a holy well dedicated to Saint Colmcille. The trail contours around Ballycumber Hill and then continues along the eastern slopes of Garryhoe Hill, passing the remains of a ringfort, approximately 15 metres (49 feet) in diameter. Further along is a memorial to a Dr James McNamara who was killed in a shooting accident in 1916. Passing through a series of gates along the way, the trail follows Coolafunshoge Lane, an old droving path with extensive views of south Wicklow. The lane emerges onto the road, crossing a bridge over the River Derry to reach the R747 road close to Tinahely.

=== Derry River to Clonegal ===
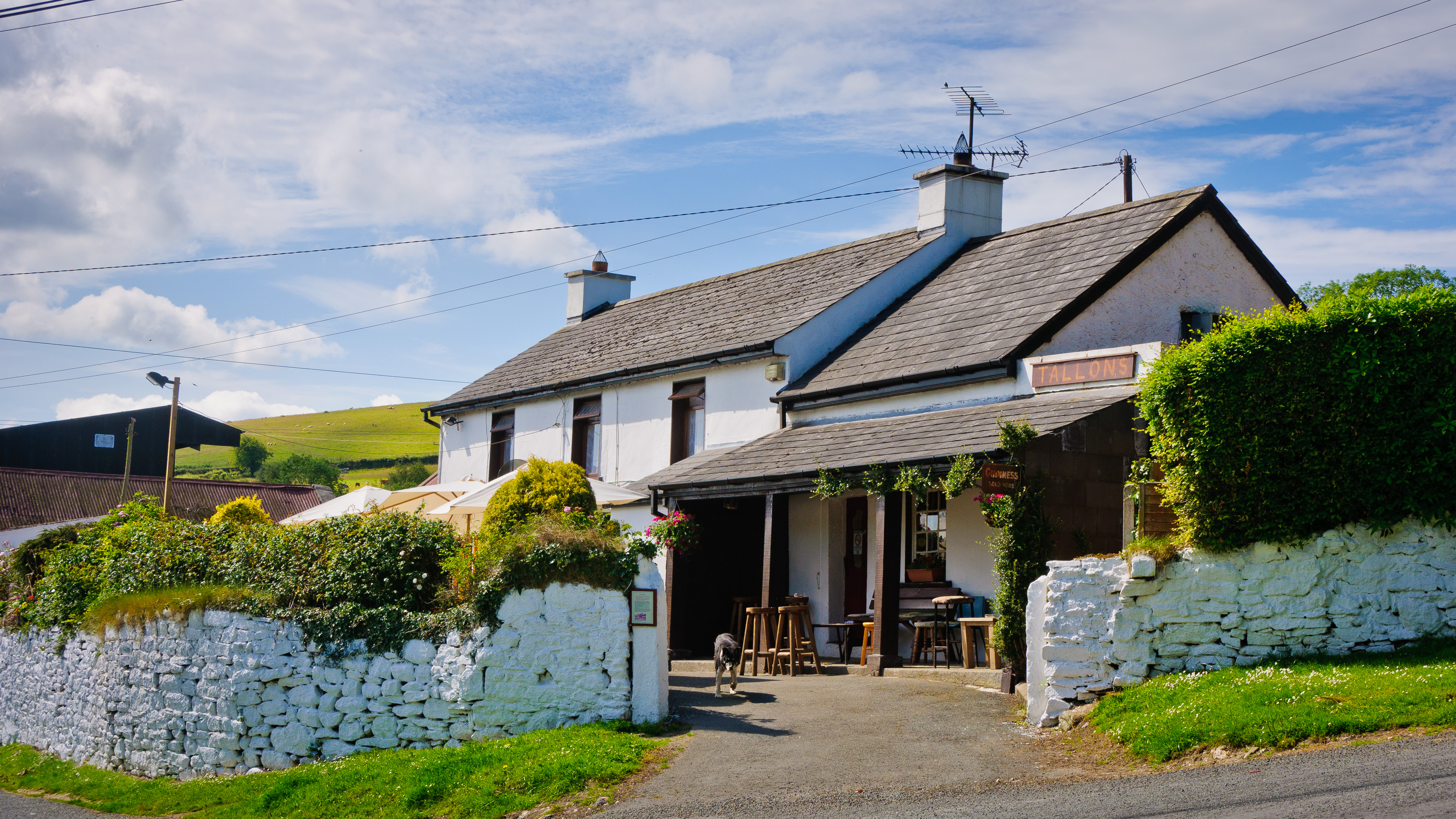
The "Dying Cow" pub at Stranakelly Crossroads

The trail follows an ancient cattle droving path around Muskeagh Hill before joining a series of country roads. 63% of this final stretch is on roads. These pass through the village of Mullinacuff whose neo-Gothic church and cottages are built from local granite. At Stranakelly Crossroads, the Way passes Tallon's pub, better known as the "Dying Cow" from a story that, when visited by police late one night, the landlady argued that she wasn't serving drink after hours but providing refreshments to neighbours who helped her with a dying cow. Circling Cronlea Hill, which is topped with a windfarm, and passing near the village of Kilquiggan, the Way crosses the R725 road near Shillelagh. The trail enters forestry at Raheenakit before joining an old drovers' road, once used to herd sheep to market in Shillelagh. The Blackstairs Mountains, whose main peak, Mount Leinster, is distinguished by the television mast on its summit, begin to dominate the horizon. The trail meanders along forestry tracks around Moylisha and Urelands Hills. Urelands Hill is littered with hornblende-rich schist, a legacy of a chain of long-extinct volcanic islands that existed 450–500 million years ago when this part of Ireland lay under the primeval Iapetus Ocean. Joining the road for the final stretch into Clonegal, the Way leaves County Wicklow and enters County Carlow at Wicklow Bridge, about 3 kilometres (2 miles) from the end. The Wicklow Way ends in the village green of Clonegal where a stone bench and a map board, displaying the entire route from Marlay Park, may be found.

== Intersecting and connecting paths ==
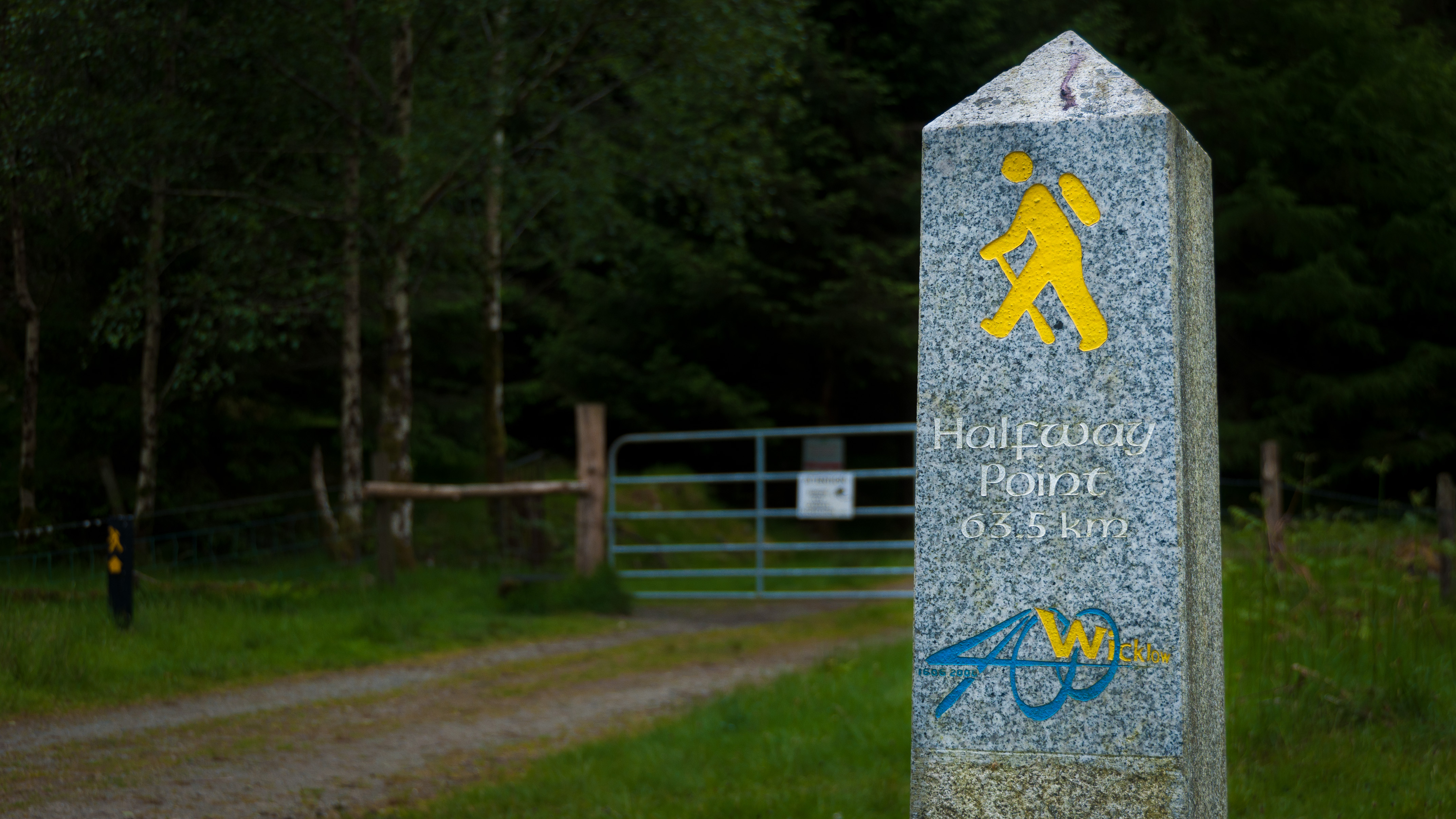
The halfway point of the Wicklow Way at the entrance to Drumgoff Forest, Glenmalure

The Wicklow Way forms part of European walking route E8 which runs from Dursey Island in County Cork to Istanbul in Turkey. The Irish section incorporates the Wicklow Way, the South Leinster Way, the East Munster Way, the Blackwater Way and parts of the Kerry Way and the Beara Way. There is an unmarked link route from Dublin Port (where the E8 connects to Liverpool by ferry) which follows the River Dodder to Rathfarnham and on to the Wicklow Way trailhead at Marlay Park via Saint Enda's Park. Similarly, an unmarked road walk connects Clonegal with the trailhead of the South Leinster Way in Kildavin, County Carlow.

The Wicklow Way also shares part of its route with the Dublin Mountains Way along a section of the ridge between Two Rock and Tibradden. The Saint Kevin's Way Pilgrim Path starts at either Hollywood or Valleymount, County Wicklow and ends at Glendalough where it connects with the Wicklow Way.

Sections of the Wicklow Way are also used by several National Looped Walks: the Maulin Mountain Loop and the Ballycumber, Kyle, and Mangan's Loops near Tinahely.

== Sporting events ==
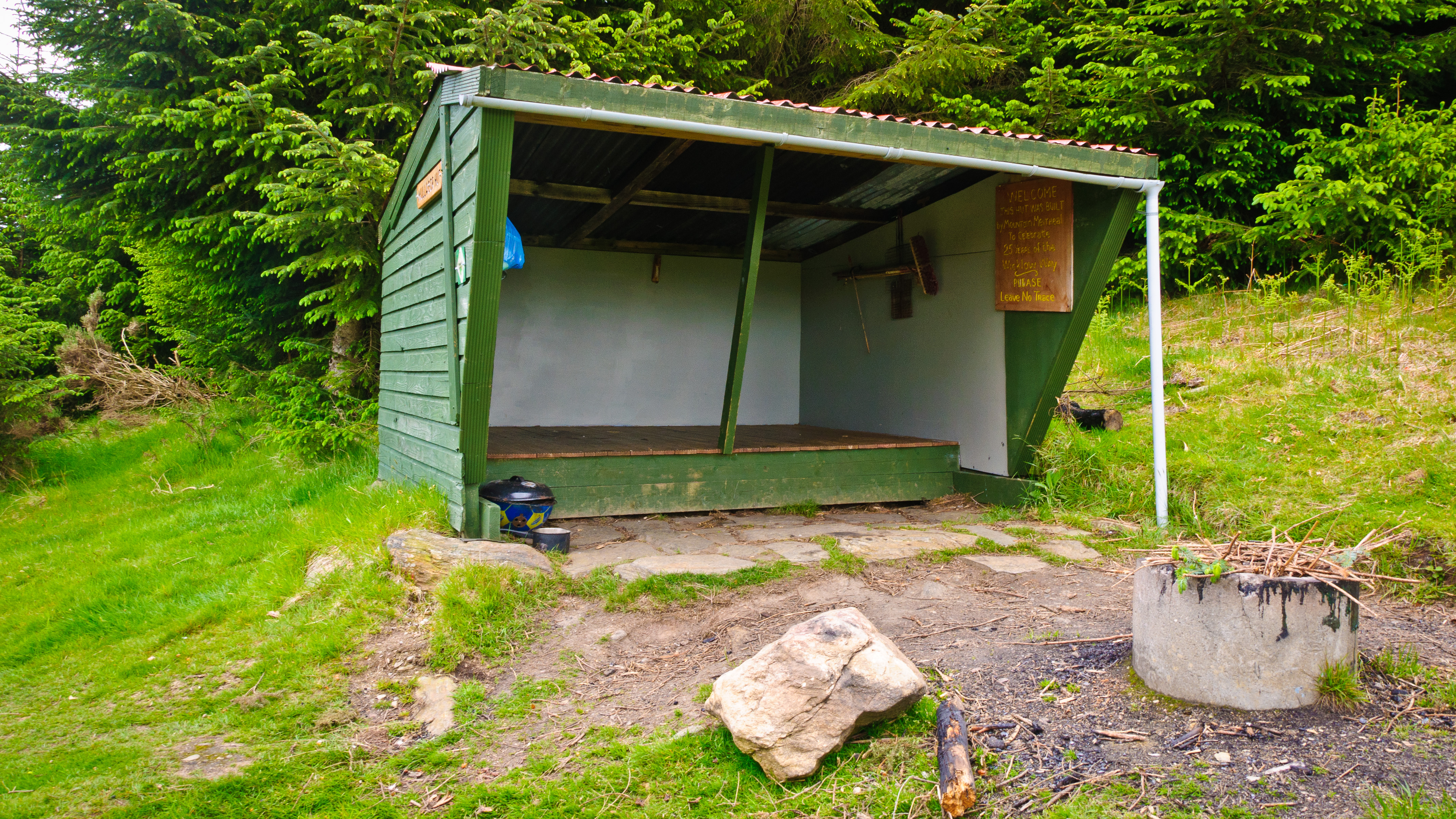
Mullacor Hut, an Adirondack shelter constructed by volunteer group Mountain Meitheal on the Wicklow Way in Glenmalure

A number of mountain running events are held along the route of the Way. The Wicklow Way Relay is an event run between Kilmashogue and Shillelagh for teams of 2 to 8 runners. The Wicklow Way Ultra (aka Maurice Mullins Ultra) is a 51-kilometre (32-mile) individual event run between Glencullen and Ballinastoe Woods. The record for running the entire distance of the Wicklow Way from Marlay Park to Clonegal is held by Robbie Britton who completed the route on 8 June 2019 in a time of 12:11:07. The ladies record was set in the same event by Aoife Mundow in 16:06:30 .

== Public transport ==
The trailhead at Marlay Park is served by a number of Dublin Bus and Go-Ahead Ireland routes. There is no public transport available to or from the trailhead in Clonegal, with the closest bus routes serving the nearby villages of Kildavin and Bunclody, County Carlow. Some places on or near the route are also served by bus. The St. Kevins (sic) Bus Service stops at Roundwood, Laragh and Glendalough. The Wicklow Way Bus provides services to Laragh, Glendalough, Glenmalure, Iron Bridge and Tinahely.

== See also ==
- Wicklow Round
