= East Munster Way =

Long-distance trail in Ireland

- Length: 75 kilometres (47 miles)
- Location: Counties Waterford and Tipperary, Ireland
- Designation: National Waymarked Trail
- Trailheads: Carrick-on-Suir, Clogheen
- Use: Hiking
- Elevation gain/loss: +1,375 m (4,511 ft)
- Difficulty: Moderate
- Season: Any
- Surface: Riverside paths, woodland, moorland, roads

The East Munster Way, formerly known as the Munster Way, is a long-distance trail in Ireland. It is 75 kilometres (47 miles) long and begins in Carrick-on-Suir, County Tipperary and ends in Clogheen, County Tipperary. It is typically completed in three days. It is designated as a National Waymarked Trail by the National Trails Office of the Irish Sports Council and is managed by Tipperary County Council, Coillte and Waterford County Council. The trail was opened by Frank Fahey, Minister of State for Youth and Sport in July 1988.

Starting in Carrick-on-Suir, the East Munster Way follows the banks of the River Suir to the village of Kilsheelan before passing through Gurteen Wood in the foothills of the Comeragh Mountains to reach the town of Clonmel. The Way then climbs into the hills to the south of Clonmel before descending to reach the village of Newcastle. From Newcastle, the trail crosses the northern flanks of the Knockmealdown Mountains before descending to reach The Vee Gap before following the road to the end at Clogheen.

The East Munster Way forms part of European walking route E8 which runs from Dursey Island in County Cork to Istanbul in Turkey. The Irish section incorporates the Wicklow Way, the South Leinster Way, the East Munster Way, the Blackwater Way and parts of the Kerry Way and the Beara Way. The East Munster Way connects with the South Leinster Way at Carrick-on-Suir and with the Blackwater Way at Clogheen.

A review of the National Waymarked Trails in 2010 found low multiday use of the trail and moderate to high day use of the trail. The report recommended the establishment of a trail management committee and the rerouting of sections on tarred roads where possible.
