= South Leinster Way =

Trail in Ireland

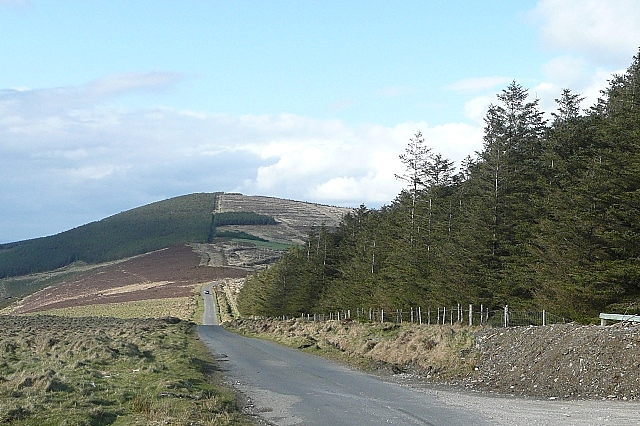
- Trail near Croaghaun, Blackstairs Mountains
- Length: 104 kilometres (65 miles)
- Location: South-east Ireland
- Designation: National Waymarked Trail
- Trailheads: Kildavin, County Carlow; Carrick-on-Suir, County Tipperary
- Use: Hiking
- Elevation gain/loss: +1,490 m (4,888 ft)
- Difficulty: Moderate
- Season: Any
- Website: http://www.southleinsterway.com/

The South Leinster Way is a long-distance trail in Ireland. It is 104 kilometres (65 miles) long and begins in Kildavin, County Carlow and runs through County Kilkenny before ending in Carrick-on-Suir, County Tipperary. It is typically completed in five days. It is designated as a National Waymarked Trail by the National Trails Office of the Irish Sports Council and is jointly managed by Carlow County Council, Kilkenny County Council, Tipperary County Council, Carlow Local Sports Partnership, Kilkenny Trails and Coillte. It was opened on 30 November 1985 by Donal Creed, Minister of State for Sport.

The initial stages run through the Blackstairs Mountains, crossing the flanks of Mount Leinster, the highest mountain in the range to reach the village of Borris. From Borris, the Way follows the towpath of the River Barrow to the town of Graiguenamanagh where it enters County Kilkenny. The route continues from Graiguenamanagh towards Inistioge via the northern slopes of Brandon Hill, the highest mountain in County Kilkenny. A series of tracks through forest from Inistioge leads to Mullinavat. The final stage follows the road from Mullinavat to Carrick-on-Suir.

The South Leinster Way forms part of European walking route E8 which runs from Dursey Island in County Cork to Istanbul in Turkey. The Irish section incorporates the Wicklow Way, the South Leinster Way, the East Munster Way, the Blackwater Way and parts of the Kerry Way and the Beara Way. An unmarked road walk connects the end of the Wicklow Way in Clonegal, County Carlow with the start of the South Leinster Way at Kildavin. The East Munster Way starts where the South Leinster Way ends in Carrick-on-Suir. The South Leinster Way also connects with the Barrow Way at Graiguenamanagh and the Nore Valley Way at Inistioge.

A review of the National Waymarked Trails in 2010 found usage by multiday walkers to be low and usage by day walkers to be medium to high on some sections. The review recommended that a Trail Management Committee be established, that short scenic looped walks be developed off the trail and that the proportion of road waling (currently 55%) be reduced.
