= Blackwater Way =

Long-distance hiking trail in Ireland

The Blackwater Way
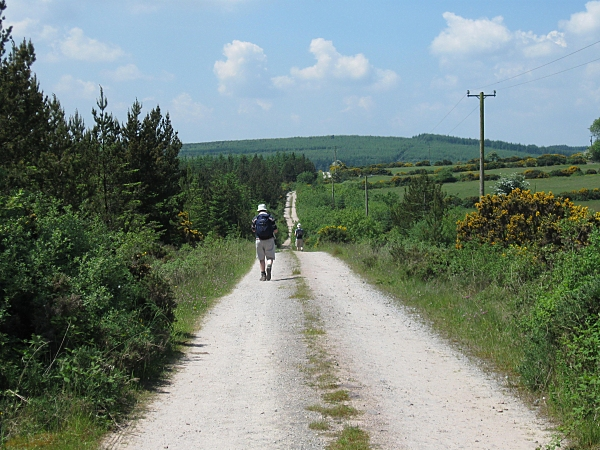
- Avondhu Way near Mitchelstown
- Length: 168 kilometres (104 miles)
- Location: Counties Tipperary, Cork & Kerry, Ireland
- Designation: National Waymarked Trail
- Trailheads: Clogheen, County Tipperary, Shrone, County Kerry
- Use: Hiking
- Difficulty: Moderate
- Season: Any

The Blackwater Way is a long-distance trail that follows the valley of the River Blackwater in Ireland. It is 168 kilometres (104 miles) long and begins in Clogheen, County Tipperary and ends in Shrone, County Kerry. It is typically completed in ten days. It is designated as a National Waymarked Trail by the National Trails Office of the Irish Sports Council and is managed by Avondhu Tourism and IRD Duhallow. It consists of two trails – the Avondhu Way between Clogheen and Bweeng, County Cork and the Duhallow Way between Bweeng and Shrone – which have been combined to form the Blackwater Way.

The Avondhu Way section crosses the Knockmealdown Mountains to reach the town of Fermoy and then crosses the northern flanks of the Nagle Mountains to reach Bweeng via Ballyhooly and Ballynamona. The Duhallow Way section crosses the Boggeragh and Derrynasaggart Mountains to reach Shrone via Millstreet.

The Blackwater Way forms part of European walking route E8 which runs from Dursey Island in County Cork to Istanbul in Turkey. The Irish section incorporates the Wicklow Way, the South Leinster Way, the East Munster Way, the Blackwater Way and parts of the Kerry Way and the Beara Way. The Blackwater Way connects with the East Munster Way at Clogheen. There is no marked trail connecting the Blackwater Way with the Kerry Way; an unmarked route connects Shrone with the start of the Kerry Way in Killarney.
