= Croaghanmoira =

Mountain in Wicklow, Ireland

- Cruachán Mhaigh Rath
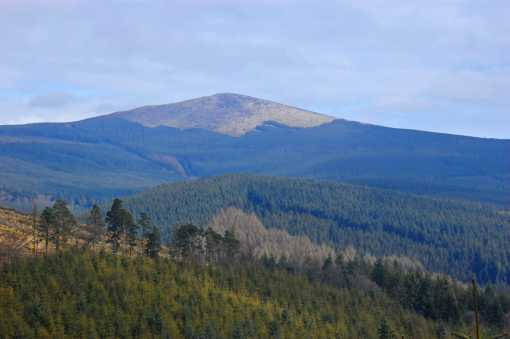
- View from the north

Highest point
- Elevation: 664 m (2,178 ft)
- Prominence: 209 m (686 ft)
- Listing: 100 Highest Irish Mountains, Marilyn, Hewitt, Arderin, Simm, Vandeleur-Lynam
- Coordinates: 52.918437°N 6.366549°W

Naming
- English translation: little stack of Moira
- Language of name: Irish

Geography
- Location within island of Ireland
- Location: County Wicklow, Ireland
- Parent range: Wicklow Mountains
- OSI/OSNI grid: T0992286504
- Topo map: OSi Discovery 62

Geology
- Mountain type: Quartzite bedrock

Croaghanmoira (Irish: Cruachán Mhaigh Rath, meaning 'little stack of Moira') at 664 metres (2,178 ft), is the 136th–highest peak in Ireland on the Arderin scale, and the 165th–highest peak on the Vandeleur-Lynam scale. Croaghanmoira is situated in the far south-east corner of the Wicklow Mountains range, and sits on its own small massif with several other lesser but well known peaks, separated from the nearby larger massif of Lugnaquilla by the Laragh to Aghavannagh road; the summit of Croaghanmoira has a distinctive "pyramidal" profile.

== Naming ==
According to Irish academic Paul Tempan, the "Moira" is from the title of the "Earl of Moira" who owned lands around Greenan, and historical papers record references to the purchase of the Ballinacor Estate and House from Francis Rawdon-Hastings, 1st Marquess of Hastings, the "Earl of Moira" in 1805. At the time of the purchase, the mountain would have been the "Cruachán" behind Ballinacor House. Tempan notes another name for the mountain, The Mottie.

== Geography ==
Croaghanmoira's prominence of 209 metres (686 ft), qualifies it was a Marilyn, and also ranks it as the 87th-highest mountain in Ireland on the MountainViews Online Database, 100 Highest Irish Mountains, where the minimum prominence threshold is 100 metres.

Croaghanmoira's massif includes the northern subsidiary summit of Croaghanmoira North Top 575 metres (1,886 ft), which has a prominence of 27 metres (89 ft), thus qualifying it an Arderin Beg. Immediately to the east of Croaghanmoira is the summit of Ballinacor Mountain 531 metres (1,742 ft), which has a prominence of 56 metres (184 ft), thus qualifying it an Arderin. To the west of Croaghanmoira is the summit of Carrickashane Mountain 508 metres (1,667 ft), which has a prominence of 43 metres (141 ft), and thus also qualifies as an Arderin.

== Bibliography ==
- MountainViews Online Database (Simon Stewart) (2013). A Guide to Ireland's Mountain Summits: The Vandeleur-Lynams & the Arderins. Collins Books. ISBN 978-1-84889-164-7.
- Dillion, Paddy (1993). The Mountains of Ireland: A Guide to Walking the Summits. Cicerone. ISBN 978-1852841102.

== See also ==
- Wicklow Way
- Wicklow Mountains
- Lists of mountains in Ireland
- List of mountains of the British Isles by height
- List of Marilyns in the British Isles
- List of Hewitt mountains in England, Wales and Ireland
