= Greenane =

Greenane may refer to:

- One of the Galty Mountains in Munster, Ireland
- Alternative spelling of Greenan, County Wicklow, Ireland, a village
