= Kerry Way =

Walking trail in County Kerry, Ireland

Coordinates: 52°03′32″N 9°30′31″W

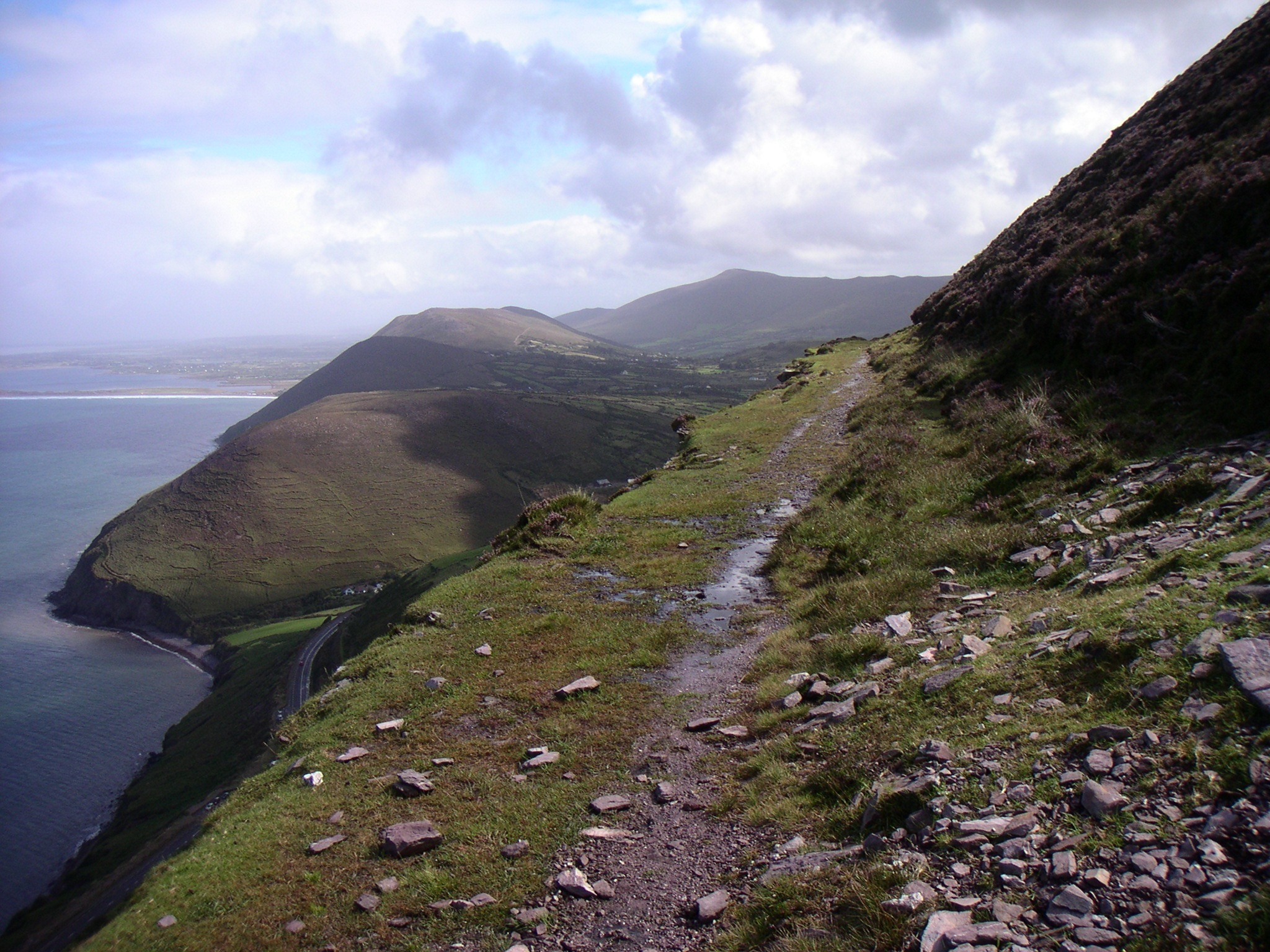
- Length: 214 kilometres (133 miles)
- Location: County Kerry, Ireland
- Designation: National Waymarked Trail
- Trailheads: Killarney
- Use: Hiking
- Elevation gain/loss: 5,310 m (17,421 ft)
- Highest point: Windy Gap (385 m (1,263 ft))
- Difficulty: Strenuous
- Season: Any
- Sights: Iveragh Peninsula
- Website: http://www.kerryway.com/

The Kerry Way (Irish: Slí Uíbh Ráthaigh) is a long-distance trail in County Kerry, Ireland. It is a 214-kilometre (133-mile) long circular trail that begins and ends in Killarney and is typically broken into nine stages. It is designated as a National Waymarked Trail by the National Trails Office of the Irish Sports Council and is managed by Kerry County Council, South Kerry Development Partnership and the Kerry Way Committee. The Way circles the Iveragh Peninsula and forms a walkers' version of the Ring of Kerry road tour. It is the longest of Ireland's National Waymarked Trails.

== History ==
The Kerry Way was first proposed in 1982 and developed by members of the Laune Mountaineering Club and the Kerry association of An Taisce, under the chairmanship of Seán Ó Súilleabháin. Ó Súilleabháin was inspired by a history lecture he had attended given by Father John Hayes on the subject of old roads and paths in the southwest of Ireland. Realising that "there was a spider's web-like network of roads and paths that could be combined to form a route around Kerry", he began devising the trail that would become the Kerry Way. The first section—from Killarney to Glenbeigh—was opened by Tánaiste Dick Spring in 1985. It was the second long-distance trail to be opened in the Republic of Ireland, after the Wicklow Way. The full route was completed in 1989 and opened by Frank Fahey, TD, Minister of State for Youth and Sport. The trail was constructed by workers on FÁS social employment schemes at a cost of IEP £60,000 and involved the provision of over 200 stiles and six footbridges as well as waymarkers.

A review of the National Waymarked Trails in 2010 found the Kerry Way to be one of the most heavily used of the trails. It recommended that it be one of five National Waymarked Trails that should be prioritised to be upgraded to a National Long Distance Trail, a proposed new standard of trail in Ireland, intended to meet international standards for outstanding trails.

The name in Irish is Slí Uíbh Ráthaigh, meaning the Iveragh Way, called after the Iveragh Peninsula.

== Route ==
The trail originally started at the River Flesk, 1 kilometre (1 mile) from Killarney, but has since been extended to start in the centre of Killarney. The initial stage passes through the grounds of Muckross House, the gateway to Killarney National Park, passing the shores Lough Leane and Muckross Lake to reach Torc Waterfall. From Torc, the trail follows the Old Kenmare Road and crosses Esknamucky Glen to reach the Black Valley.

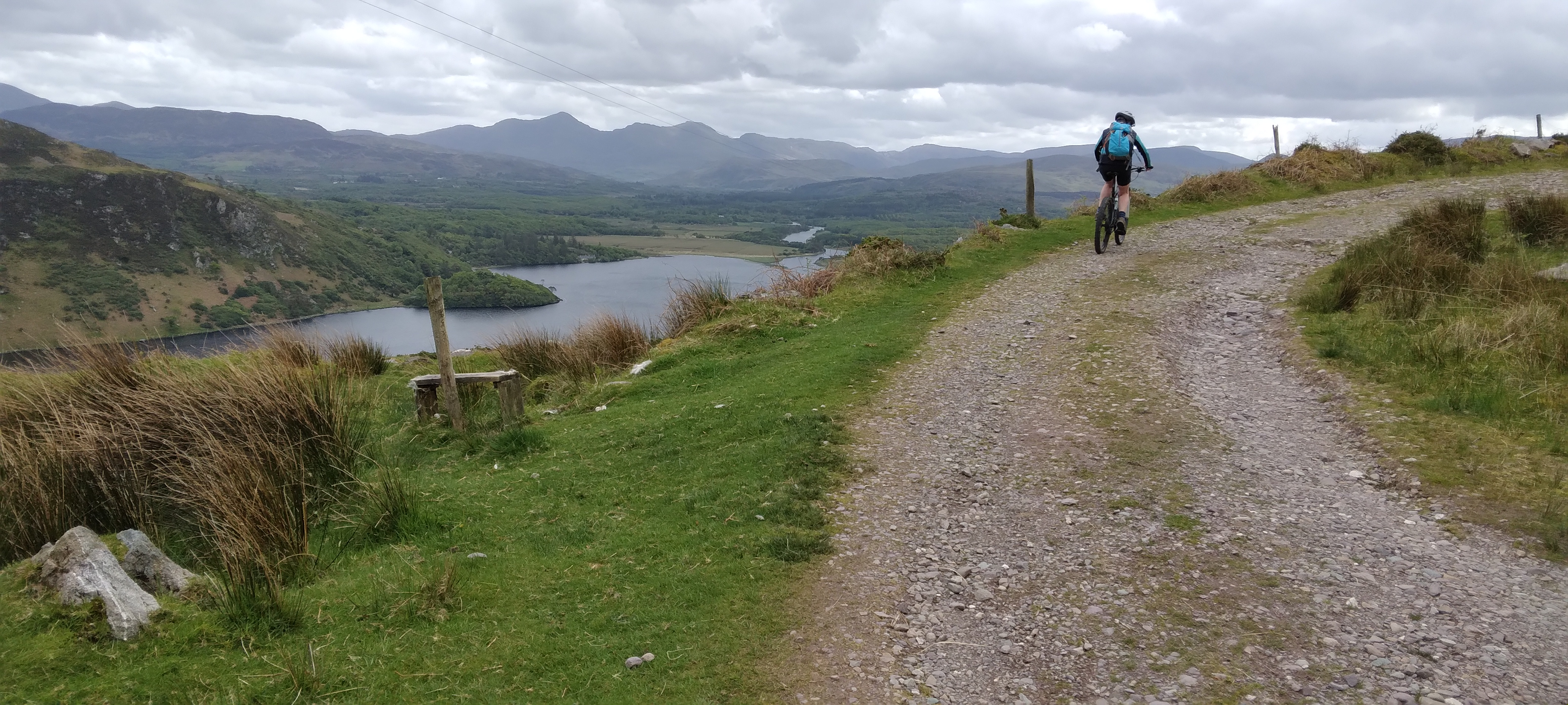
Above Lough Caragh on the Kerry Way, heading south

The Way passes through the Black Valley below MacGillycuddy's Reeks, including Carrauntoohil, Ireland's highest mountain. It then follows a road through Cummeenduff Glen to reach Bridia Valley. It then follows the Lack Road over another mountain pass into Derrynafeana Glen to reach Lough Acoose where it then follows a road to the village of Glencar. From Glencar, the trail follows the Caragh River valley before circling Seefin Mountain to reach Glenbeigh. There are two marked routes around Seefin: a shorter route to the west of the mountain via Windy Gap or a longer route to the east above Lough Caragh and overlooking Dingle Bay. The Way then climbs and follows the hills overlooking Dingle Bay until it reaches Drung Hill, where it turns inland to Foilmore. An 11-kilometre (6.8-mile) linking spur provides a connection from Foilmore to Cahersiveen.

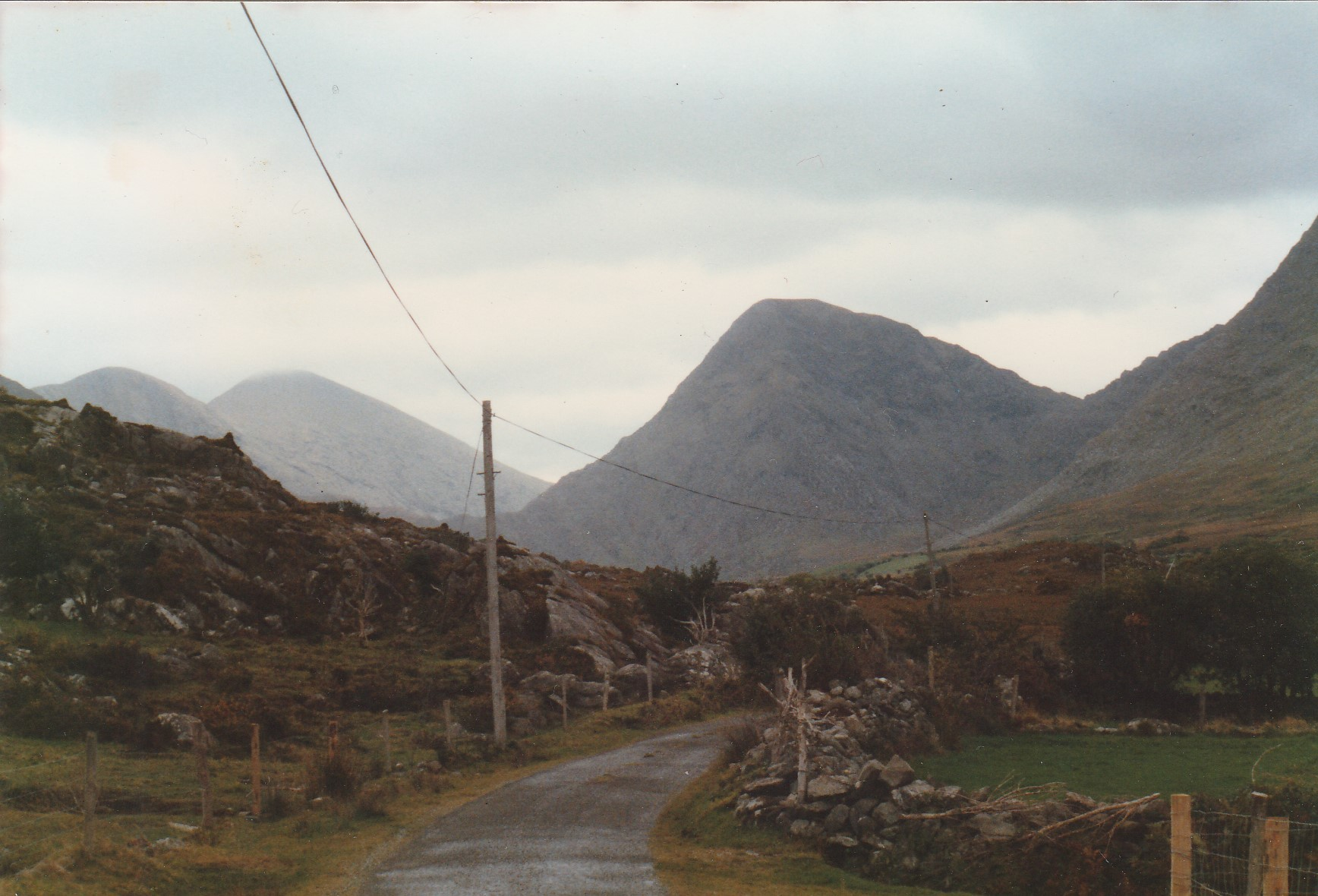
The Bridia Valley, with Broaghnabinnia at centre

From Foilemore, the route traverses two ridges to reach the village of Waterville. From Waterville, there are two possible routes to Caherdaniel: a coastal trail around Farraniargh Mountain or an inland trail, crossing Capall River and crossing mountains via Windy Gap to Caherdaniel. An old coach road brings the Way to Sneem. Sneem and Kenmare are connected by a trail that follows the coast above Kenmare River. The final stretch crosses the mountains between Kenmare and Killarney via another Windy Gap rejoining the outbound route of the Way at Galway's Bridge retracing the route through Muckross to the end in Killarney.

== Intersecting and connecting paths ==
The Kenmare to Killarney section of the Kerry Way forms part of European walking route E8 which runs from Dursey Island in County Cork to Istanbul in Turkey. The E8 continues along the Beara Way from Kenmare and joins the Blackwater Way via an unmarked link section between Killarney and Shrone.
