= Barrow Way =

Long-distance trail in Ireland

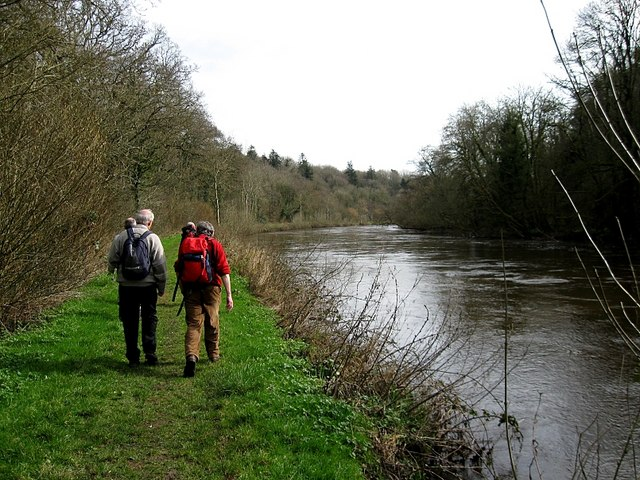
- Towpath of the River Barrow near Borris, County Carlow, part of the Barrow Way
- Length: 100 kilometres (62 miles)
- Location: Ireland
- Designation: National Waymarked Trail
- Trailheads: Robertstown, County Kildare; St Mullin's, County Carlow
- Use: Hiking
- Elevation gain/loss: 1,370 m (4,495 ft)
- Difficulty: Easy
- Season: Any
- Surface: Grassy towpaths, tracks and roads

Bagenalstown Lock and Mill looking downstream, standing on the Barrow Way, 2023

The Barrow Way (Irish: Slí na Bearú) is a long-distance trail in Ireland. It is 100 kilometres (62 miles) long and begins in Robertstown, County Kildare and ends in St Mullin's, County Carlow, following the course of the River Barrow and the Barrow Line of the Grand Canal through counties Kildare, Carlow, Kilkenny and Laois. It is typically completed in four days. It is designated as a National Waymarked Trail by the National Trails Office of the Irish Sports Council and is managed by Waterways Ireland.

The trail starts in Robertstown and follows the Barrow Line Canal, a branch of the Grand Canal, as far as Athy via the towns of Rathangan and Monasterevin. The section from Robertstown to Rathangan once formed part of the now defunct Kildare Way. At Athy, the Way joins the River Barrow and follows its banks to St Mullin's, taking in the towns of Carlow, Leighlinbridge, Bagenalstown, Goresbridge, Borris and Graiguenamanagh.

The Barrow Way connects with the Grand Canal Way at Robertstown. It also shares its route with that of the South Leinster Way between Borris and Graiguenamanagh.

A review of the National Waymarked Trails in 2010 found usage by multiday walkers to be moderate and usage by day walkers to be high. The Barrow Way is often done by way of a series of out and back excursions rather than as one continuous walk. The review recommended consideration be given to developing sections as a cycle route. The review also recommended that the Barrow Way be designated as a National Waterway Trail as it falls into the category of trails that follow the towpaths of inland waterways.
