= Mealagh Valley =

Valley in Ireland

Coordinates: 51°43′29.3″N 9°21′13.4″W

The Mealagh Valley (Irish: Gleann na Míolaí from An Mhíolach) is a natural river valley located just outside the town of Bantry, in the south-west of Ireland about 1.5 hours from Cork Airport.

The Mealagh River runs through the centre of the valley with the Mealach Beag (Irish, English translation: Small Mealagh), its only named tributary. The Mealagh River rises on Nowen Hill (Irish: Cnoc na nAbhann, meaning 'hill of the rivers'), where the River Bandon also has its source. According to Myler (1998), there is an alternative tradition in the Valley concerning the origin of Nowen Hill's name, whereby it is Cnoc na hÓna, named as the 'hill of the caves'. He further notes that 'in the past souterrains too were often referred to as caves.'

== Name and Etymology ==
The river is An Mhíolach (the Mealagh), while the surrounding valley is Gleann na Míolaí, literally “the valley of the Mealagh.

Different explanations have been proposed for the origins of its name. One explanation that has gained some popularity is that it derives from the word 'Mealach', the Irish for “honeyed”, as the area has a large number of wild bees in its surroundings.

Another interpretation relates the Irish name "An Mhíolach" to the Irish word Irish: Míolach, which can mean ‘full of animals or living creatures’, though it also carries the senses ‘verminous’ and ‘lousy’. Interestingly, this interpretation overlaps with the theory associating the name with bees, as both suggest an abundance of living creatures. Loganim.ie has published a piece that discusses míol and míolach specifically in Irish placenames. They explain that míol historically had a very broad meaning—essentially an animal or creature—and that consequently it can be difficult to know which particular creature a placename refers to.

Daniel Donovan (1878) describes the Mealagh river as 'a murmuring stream, as the Irish name denotes'. However, he offers no further explanation of the Irish name or the linguistic basis for this interpretation

According to the archival records for the River Mealagh (Irish: Mhíolach) on logainm.ie, it is referred to as the 'Mellagh flu' (Meallegh?) in 1594 (Mercator) and the 'Mellogh flu' (Speed, 1610) and as the 'Moyallagh' (1685, 1750). 'Moyallah flu' is found in the Down Survey (1656-1658) map of County Cork, while 'Mollagh flu' is present in the Blaeu Atlas Maior (1662). In John Rocque's Map of the Kingdom of Ireland (1790) it is the 'R. Moyallagh' with a 'Mealagh Br.'.. Other variants recorded by logainm.ie are 'meanagh river' (1840) 'mianlach, river of the mines', 'Meanlagh' and 'Mialach River.

In Sketches in Carbery, County Cork (1876), Daniel Donovan states the River Mealagh was formerly known as the 'Myalagh', though he does not provide further details. It is documented as the 'R. Mealagh' on the 1845 Ordnance Survey of Ireland.

== Schools ==
It currently has one school (Dromclough National School), which was founded in 1914. In the twentieth century, the valley was also served by Coomleigh National School. The Coomleigh school building that opened in 1934 and closed in 1968 and is now a private dwelling.

== History ==
The Mealagh Valley is noted for its many archaeological sites, which include ringforts, wedge tombs and standing stones. David Myler provided an indispensable guide to the history and archaeology of the valley in An Archaeological Survey of the Mealagh Valley (1998).. This survey was conducted by Phil Bishop, Kathleen Bishop, Sean O'Brien and David Myler. Many sites are also revisited in Myler's more recent publication Walking with Stones (2023)..

The Mealagh Valley Heritage Keepers' oral history documentary, The Voices of the Valley (2025) documents aspects of life in the Mealagh Valley during the twentieth century through interviews with local elders. The full interviews with each participant are also freely available on the Mealagh Valley Heritage website.
