= Boreen =

Country lane or narrow rural road in Ireland

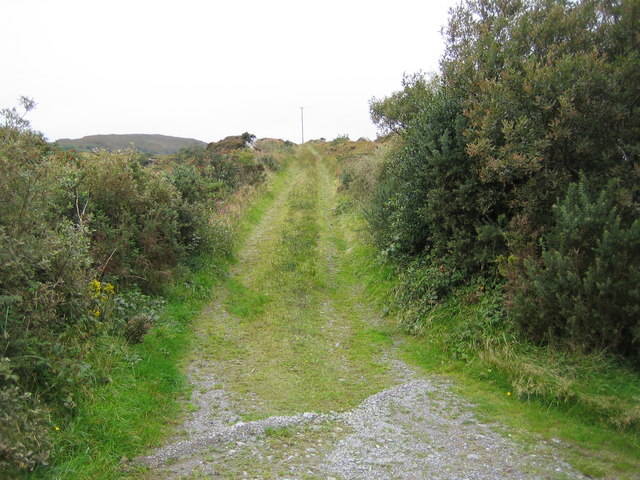
Unpaved boreen on the Beara Peninsula, County Cork.

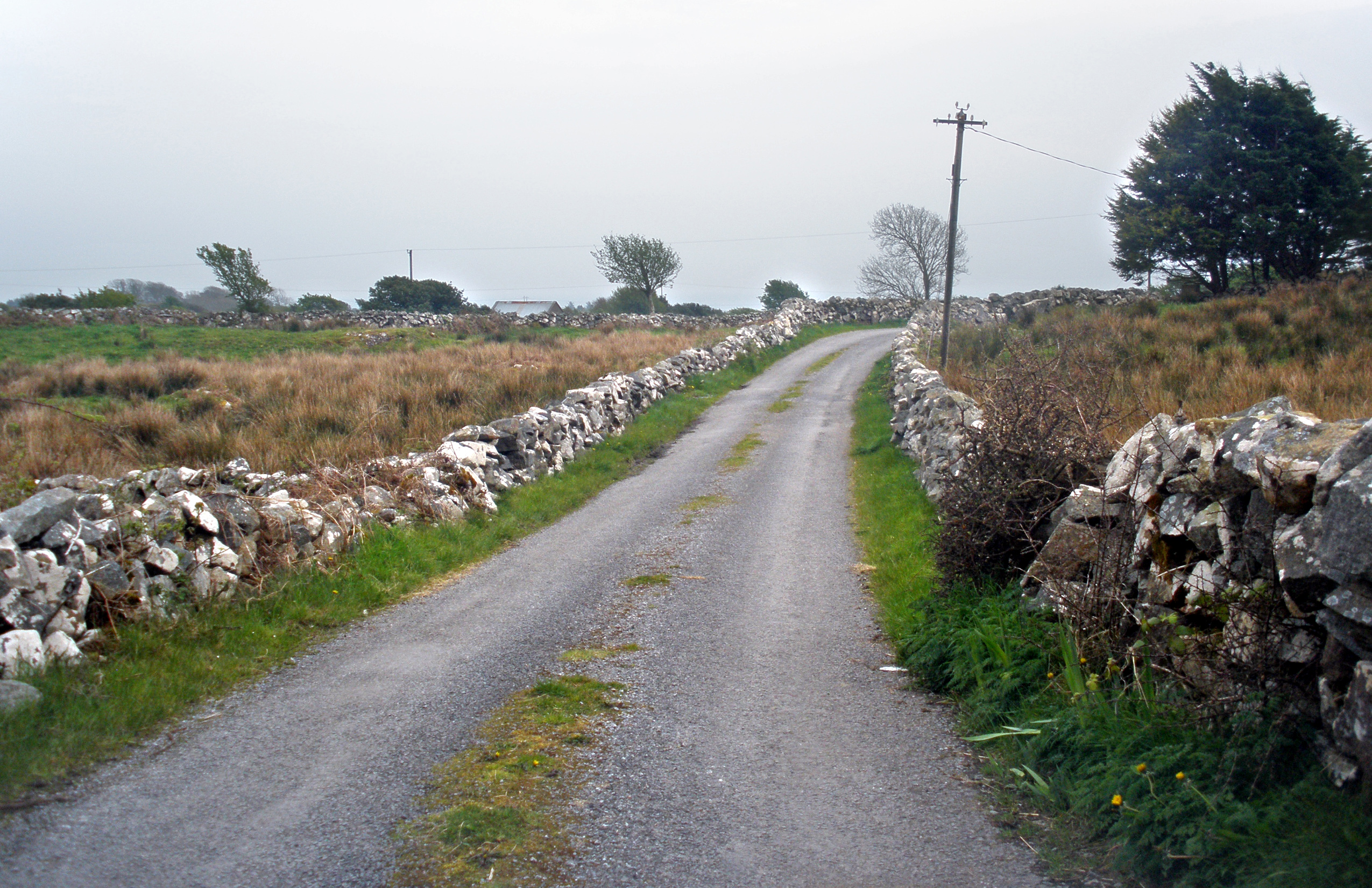
Paved boreen in Baile Éamon, Spiddal, County Galway.

A boreen or bohereen (/bɔːˈriːn/ bor-EEN; Irish: bóithrín [ˈbˠoː(h)ɾʲiːnʲ, bˠoː(h)ˈɾʲiːnʲ], meaning 'a little road') is a country lane, or narrow, frequently unpaved, rural road in Ireland.

"Boreen" also appears sometimes in names of minor urban roads such as Saint Mobhi Bóithrín (Irish: Bóithrín Mobhí), commonly known as Mobhi Boreen in Glasnevin, Dublin.

Boreens may be private rights of way that are not open for public use.

In parts of Ulster, a boreen is often called a loanin, an Ulster Scots word.

== Etymology ==
The word "boreen" comes from the Irish word bóithrín ("little road"), which in turn comes from bóthar ("road").

In origin, a bóthar was a cow path (bó means cow), a track the width of two cows, so bóithrín meant a little cow path. Bóthar was one of the five types of road identified in medieval Irish legal texts, the others being slige (on which two chariots could pass), rót (on which one chariot and two riders could pass), lámraite (a road connecting two major roads) and tógraite (a road leading to a forest or a river).

== See also ==
- Local roads in the Republic of Ireland
- Roads in Ireland
