= Beara Way =

Long-distance walking trail in southwest Ireland

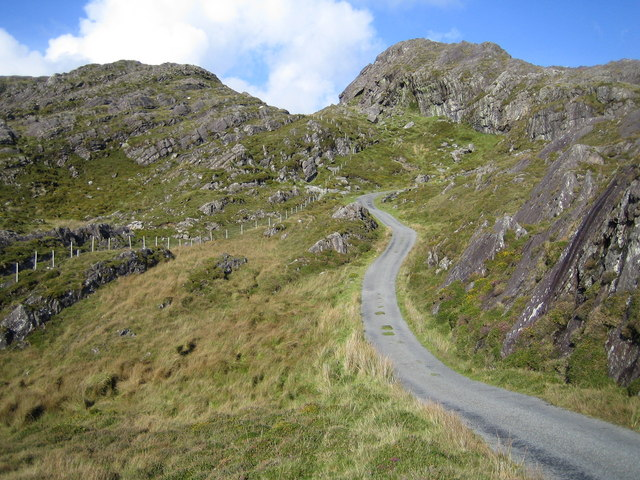
- Length: 206 kilometres (128 miles)
- Location: Counties Cork and Kerry, Ireland
- Designation: National Waymarked Trail
- Trailheads: Glengarriff
- Use: Hiking
- Elevation change: 5,300 m (17,400 ft)
- Difficulty: Strenuous
- Season: Any
- Website: http://www.bearatourism.com

The Beara Way (Irish: Slí Bhéara) is a long-distance trail in the southwest of Ireland. It is a 206-kilometre (128-mile) long circular trail around the Beara Peninsula that begins and ends in Glengarriff, County Cork, also passing through parts of County Kerry. It is typically completed in nine days. It is designated as a National Waymarked Trail by the National Trails Office of the Irish Sports Council and is managed by the Beara Tourism and Development Association.

== History ==
The Beara Tourism and Development Association began work on planning and developing the Beara Way in 1991 with funding from the West Cork County Development Team, Cospóir and Bord Fáilte. Construction was carried out by workers on FÁS social employment schemes. The completed trail was formally opened by Toddy O'Sullivan, TD, Minister of State at the Department of the Environment, in June 1996.

A major upgrade of the trail was completed in 2009 and involved the construction of 20 bridges, 200 stiles, 15 information boards and 30 plaques. A review of the National Waymarked Trails in 2010 found the Beara Way to be one of the most heavily used of the trails. It recommended that it be one of five National Waymarked Trails that should be prioritised to be upgraded to a National Long Distance Trail, a proposed new standard of trail in Ireland, intended to meet international standards for outstanding trails.

== Route ==
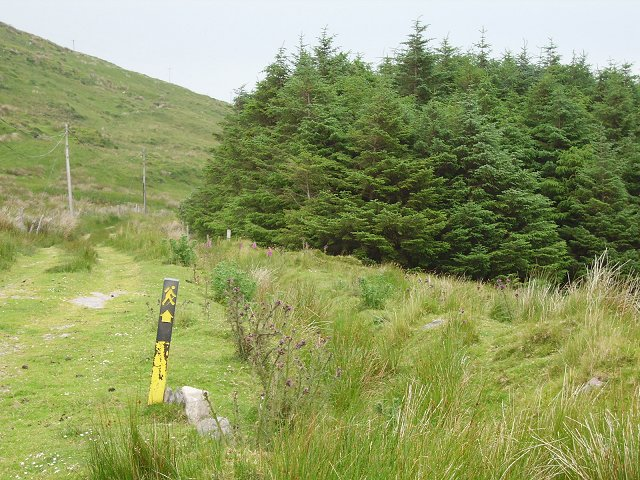
Beara Way waymark on Knockgour Mountain

Starting at Glengarriff, the Beara Way enters the Glengarriff Woods Nature Reserve, then climbs into the Caha Mountains to an altitude of 500 metres (1,600 feet) as it traverses the pass north of Sugarloaf mountain before descending to reach the village of Adrigole. From Adrigole, the trail follows the southern flanks of Hungry Hill and the Slieve Mish Mountains to reach Castletownbere. A spur route makes a circuit of Bere Island, which is connected to Castletownbere by a ferry service. The route from Castletownbere to Allihies is via an old cattle droving path. Copper mining was the main activity in Allihies for many years and the remains of abandoned mineworking dot the landscape. Another circular spur route starts from Allihies and brings the trail to the very tip of the Beara Peninsula where a cable car connects the trail with Dursey Island. From Allihies, the trail follows a miners' track and climbs the copper-rich crags above the village, crossing a mountain pass to reach Eyeries. A ridge along the coast connects Eyeries with Ardgroom. The trail then crosses into County Kerry to reach Tuosist, via Lauragh. From Tuosist, the Beara Way crosses the northern slopes of Knockagarrane and then passes between Clonee Lough and Lough Inchiquin before crossing a mountain pass. The route diverges here, continuing north to Kenmare or south to Bonane. The final stage returns to Glengarriff via Bonane Heritage Park and Esk mountain. A spur route connects Glengarriff with Kealkill, Gougane Barra and Ballingeary.

== Intersecting and connecting paths ==
The route forms part of Beara-Breifne Way, a walking and cycling route under development, intended to run from the Beara Peninsuala to Breifne, County Leitrim/County Cavan area, following the line of Donal Cam O'Sullivan Beare's march in the aftermath of the Battle of Kinsale in 1602. The Mealagh Valley Walking Route is a 20-kilometre (12-mile) trail linking the Beara Way with the Sheep's Head Way.

The Beara Way also forms the start (or end, depending on direction travelled) of European walking route E8 which runs from Dursey Island to Istanbul, Turkey. The E8 joins the Kerry Way via a link route along roads between Bonane and Kenmare.
