= Greenan, County Wicklow =

Village in County Wicklow, Ireland

Greenan An Grianán
- Village
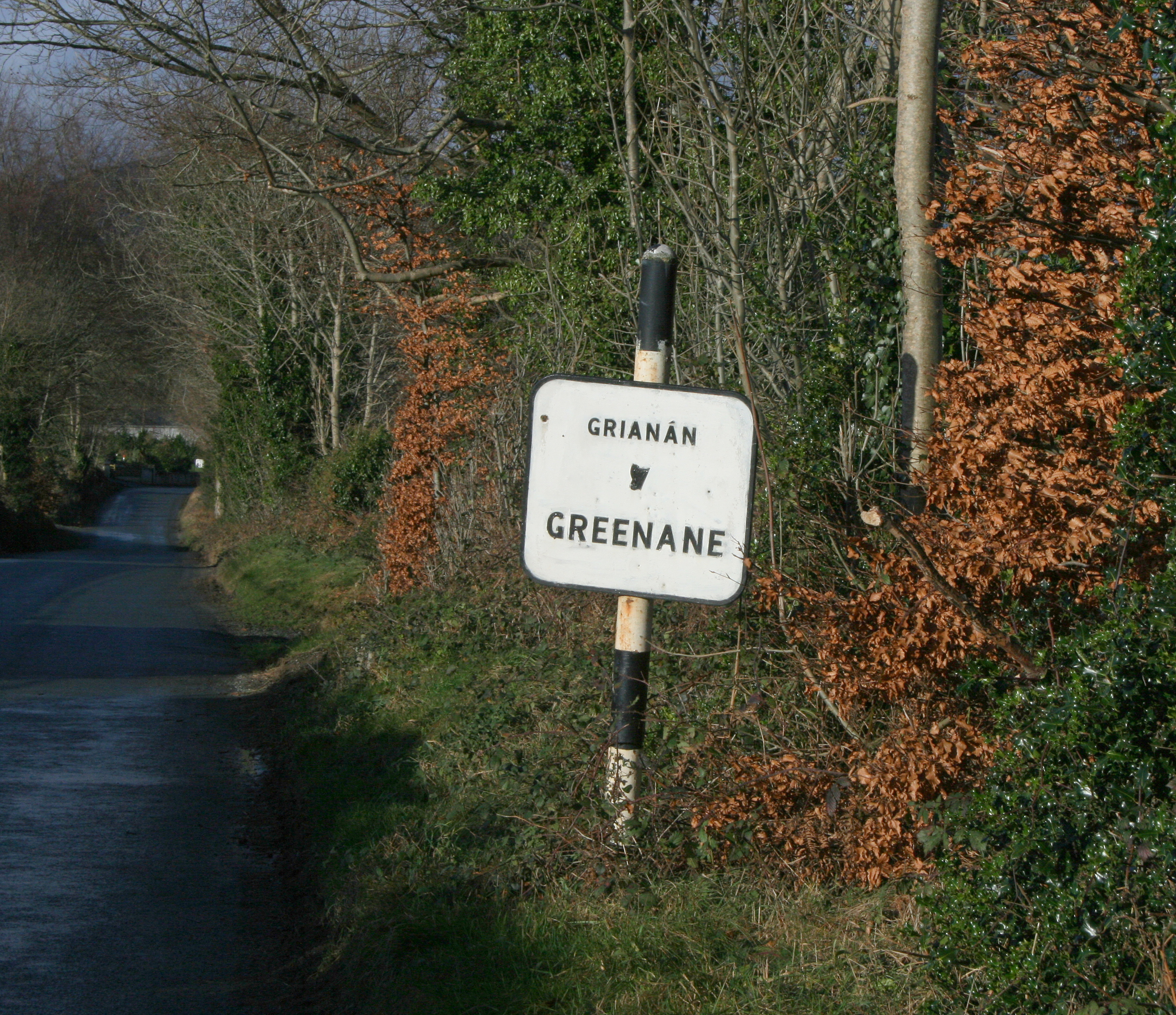
- Road signage, in which Greenan is spelled with an 'e'

- Location in Ireland
- Coordinates: 52°55′30″N 6°17′42″W
- Country: Ireland
- Province: Leinster
- County: County Wicklow
- Elevation: 90 m (300 ft)
- Time zone: UTC+0 (WET)
  - Summer (DST): UTC-1 (IST (WEST))
- Irish Grid Reference: T144873

Greenan (Irish: An Grianán, meaning 'the summerhouse') is a village in County Wicklow, Ireland. Nearby are the towns of Rathdrum and Aughrim along with the glaciated valleys of Glendalough and Glenmalure. The name is spelled 'Greenane' on older signs in the village; the modern version drops the final 'e'. Greenan is also the name of a crossing in County Monaghan.

On the main road, there are a few houses and also a primary school named Greenans Cross National School.

== See also ==
- List of towns and villages in Ireland
