= Dursey Island =

Island off southwest coast of Ireland

Native name: Oileán Baoi
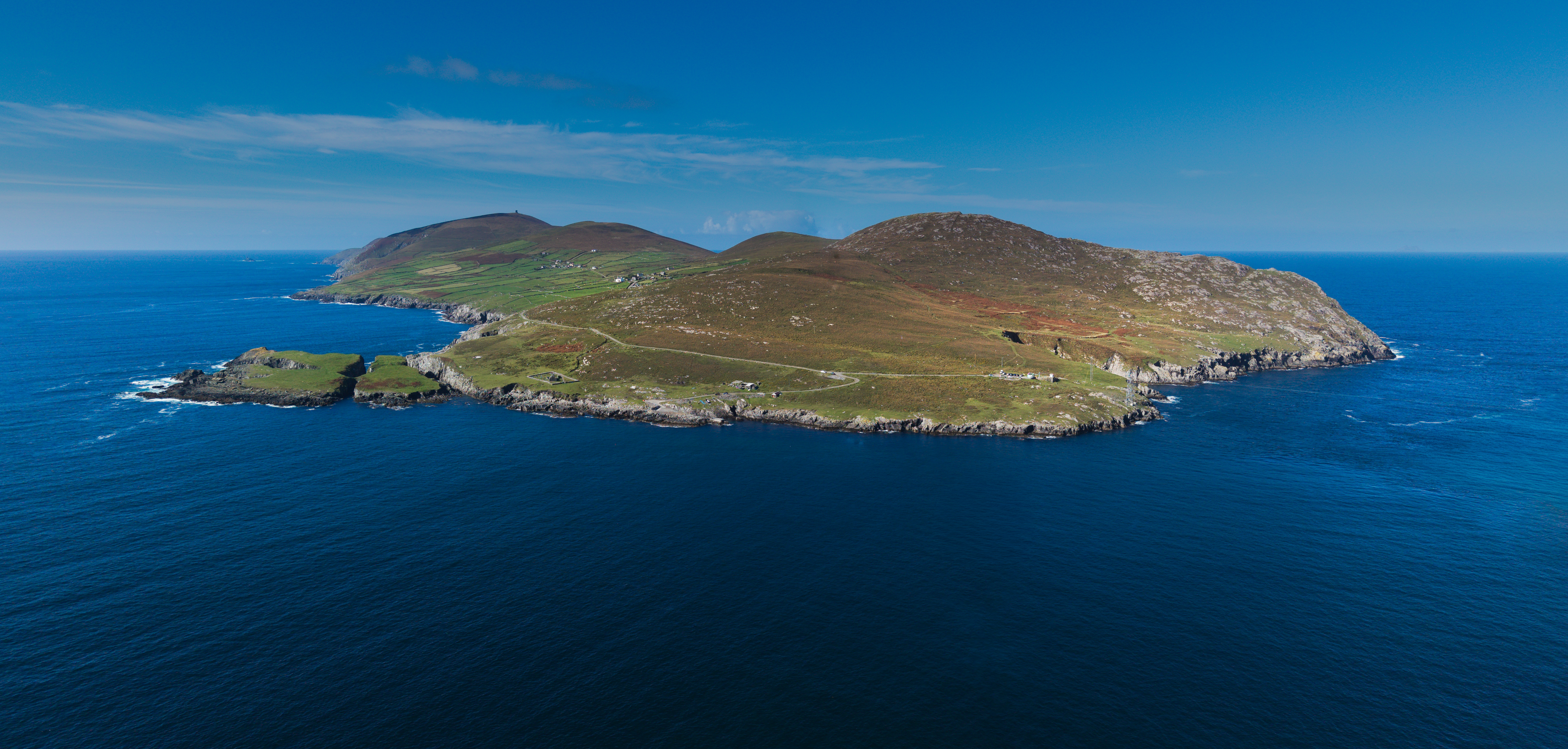
- Aerial view from the east

- Location within island of Ireland

Geography
- Location: Beara Peninsula
- Coordinates: 51°36′N 10°12′W
- Area: 5.6 km^{2} (2.2 sq mi)
- Length: 6.5 km (4.04 mi)
- Width: 1.5 km (0.93 mi)
- Highest elevation: 252 m (827 ft)

Administration
- Ireland
- Province: Munster
- County: Cork

Demographics
- Population: 3 (2022)

Additional information
- Official website: DurseyIsland.ie

Dursey Island (Irish: Baoi Bhéarra or Oileán Baoi) lies at the southwestern tip of the Beara Peninsula in the west of County Cork in Ireland. Dursey Island is 6.5 kilometres long and 1.5 kilometres wide. The island is separated from the mainland by a narrow stretch of water, Dursey Sound, which has a very strong tidal race, with the submerged Flag Rock close to the centre of the channel.

The island is connected to the mainland by Ireland's only cable car. The cable car system, which was closed for maintenance during 2022, was reopened in mid-2023 following replacement or refurbishment of its towers, tracks and related infrastructure.

As of the 2022 census, Dursey had three permanent residents. The island has no shops, pubs or restaurants. The post office on the island closed in 1974.

== Geography and fauna ==
The townlands on the island are Ballynacallagh, Kilmichael, and Tilickafinna. There are three main peaks, the highest being 252 metres (827 ft). The promontories and rocks off Dursey include:

=== Bull Rock ===
Off the western point of the island are three rocks: Bull Rock, Cow Rock and Calf Rock. Bull Rock Lighthouse, which stands on Bull Rock, was built in 1888 and automated in March 1991. Bull Rock was inhabited until this time.

Historical population (Bull Rock)

Year	Pop.	±%
1841	0	—
1851	0	0.00%
1861	0	0.00%
1871	0	0.00%
1881	0	0.00%
1891	4	—
1901	4	+0.0%
1911	4	+0.0%

Year	Pop.	±%
1926	3	−25.0%
1936	7	+133.3%
1946	3	−57.1%
1951	3	+0.0%
1956	3	+0.0%
1961	3	+0.0%
1966	3	+0.0%
1971	5	+66.7%

Year	Pop.	±%
1979	5	+0.0%
1981	1	−80.0%
1986	6	+500.0%
1991	0	−100.0%
1996	0	0.00%
2002	0	0.00%
2006	0	0.00%

Source: Central Statistics Office. "CNA17: Population by Off Shore Island, Sex and Year". CSO.ie.

=== Calf Rock ===
A staffed lighthouse on Calf Rock was destroyed in a storm in 1881 and its remains can still be seen.

=== Cow Rock ===
Cow Rock is home to a number of nesting colonies of seabirds. Dolphins, whales and basking sharks are sometimes seen in the sea off the island.

== History ==
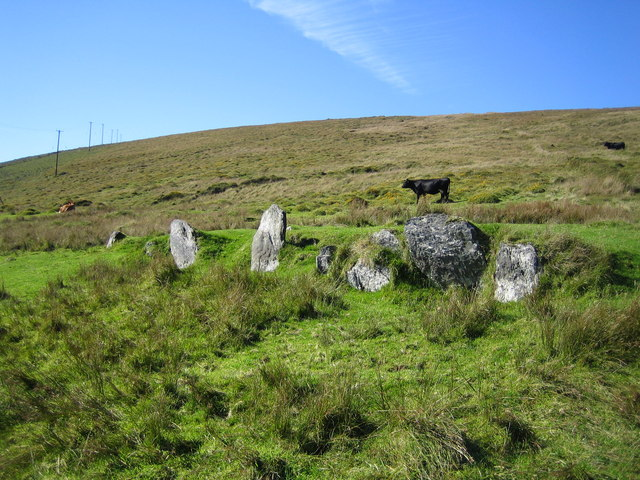
Standing stones on Dursey

Prehistoric sites have been surveyed on the island, including examples of bullaun and cup-marked stones in Ballynacallagh, a prehistoric hut site at Killowen, and a radial stone enclosure at Maughanaclea.

More prominent archaeological sites are visible at Ballynacallagh, where there is a ruined monastic church and graveyard, and at the site of a castle on Oileán Beag ("Small Island"). In 1602 this castle site was a garrison of the O'Sullivan Beare family. It was destroyed (along with Dunboy Castle) during the Nine Years' War. Philip O'Sullivan Beare claimed that all of the occupants of the castle were killed by a force under the command of George Carew in the Dursey massacre. The 300 islanders were killed; Donal Cam O'Sullivan Beare gathered his people from across Cork and set off to take shelter with the O'Rourkes of Leitrim. Of the 1,000 that set off, 35 survived to reach the O'Rourkes after the convoy was repeatedly attacked. Little evidence of the castle site remains.

On the highest point on the island, at Tilickafinna, is a signal tower dating to the Napoleonic Wars. This narrow rectangular tower had two storeys over a basement, with each storey supported by vaulted stonework. The tower has been in ruin since the mid-19th century.

During World War II a whitewashed sign saying Éire was built and painted close to the signal tower to indicate to pilots that they were overflying neutral Ireland. In July 1943 a Luftwaffe Junkers Ju 88 crashed in fog on Crow Head near Dursey, killing all crew.

Historical population

Year	Pop.	±%
1841	48	—
1851	115	+139.6%
1861	237	+106.1%
1871	197	−16.9%
1881	210	+6.6%
1891	196	−6.7%
1901	205	+4.6%
1911	210	+2.4%
1926	162	−22.9%

Year	Pop.	±%
1936	149	−8.0%
1946	128	−14.1%
1951	96	−25.0%
1956	95	−1.0%
1961	65	−31.6%
1966	53	−18.5%
1971	38	−28.3%
1979	25	−34.2%
1981	19	−24.0%

Year	Pop.	±%
1986	20	+5.3%
1991	20	+0.0%
1996	9	−55.0%
2002	6	−33.3%
2006	6	+0.0%
2011	3	−50.0%
2016	4	+33.3%
2022	3	−25.0%

Source: Central Statistics Office. "CNA17: Population by Off Shore Island, Sex and Year". CSO.ie. and "E2021: Population of Inhabited Islands Off the Coast 2011 to 2016 by Sex, Islands and Census Year".

== Tourism ==
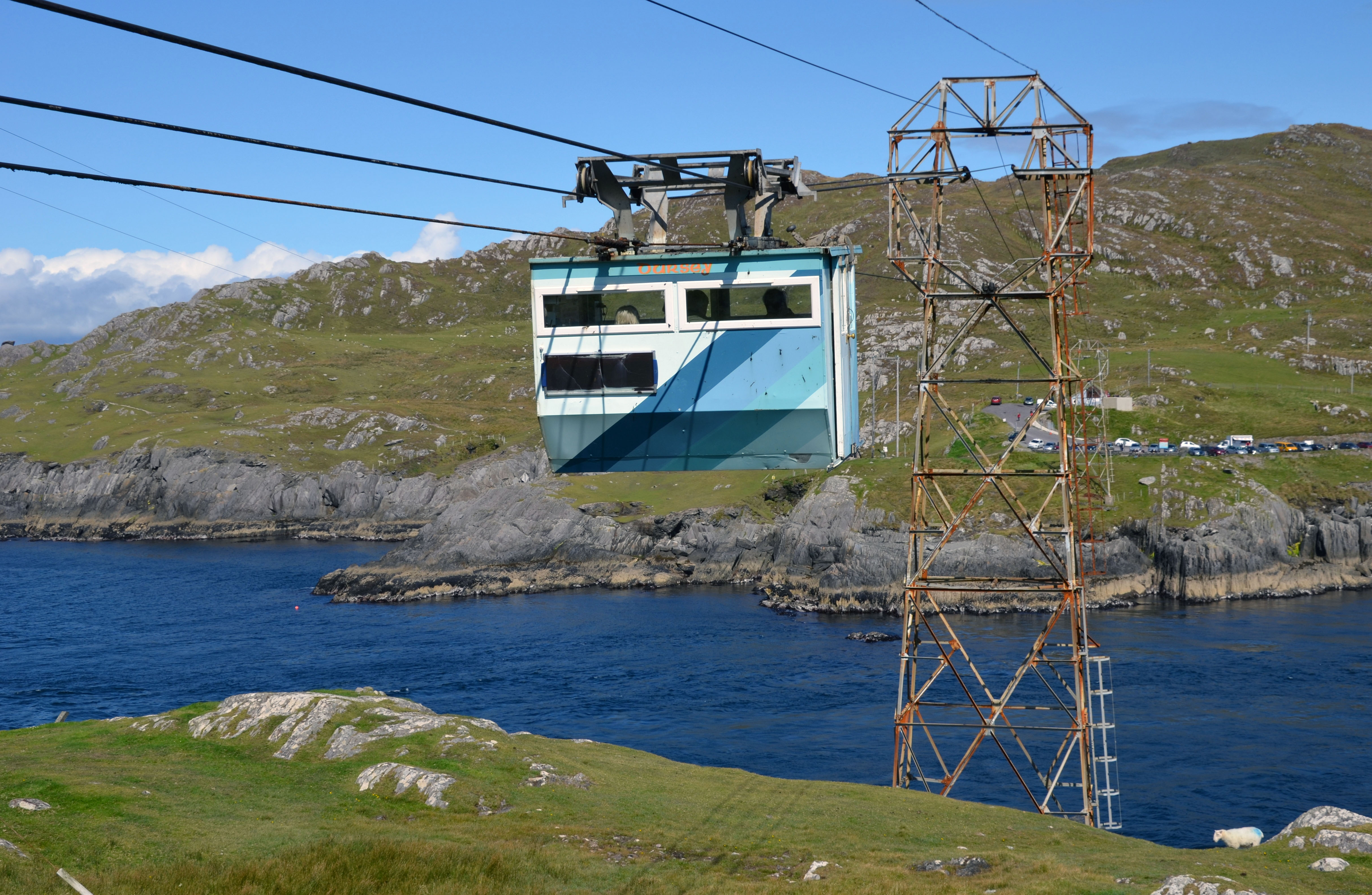
The cable car and Dursey Sound, viewed from Dursey Island (September 2015)

The island is popular with day-trippers and walkers during the summer months. A waymarked section of the Beara Way loops around the island. Dursey Island's Beara Way walk marks the beginning of Europe's E8 European long distance path, which crosses Europe, ending in Istanbul, Turkey.

Spanning Dursey Sound, the aerial tramway is Ireland's only cable car, and one of the few cable cars that cross the sea in Europe. Used by both tourists and the local population, its towers and tracks were replaced in refurbishment works undertaken during 2022 and early 2023.

Dursey Sound is also one of the "signature discovery points" along the Wild Atlantic Way, a coastal touring route that stretches along Ireland's Atlantic coastline.

Dursey has no shops, pubs or restaurants, but a few holiday homes are rented on the island.

== Gallery ==
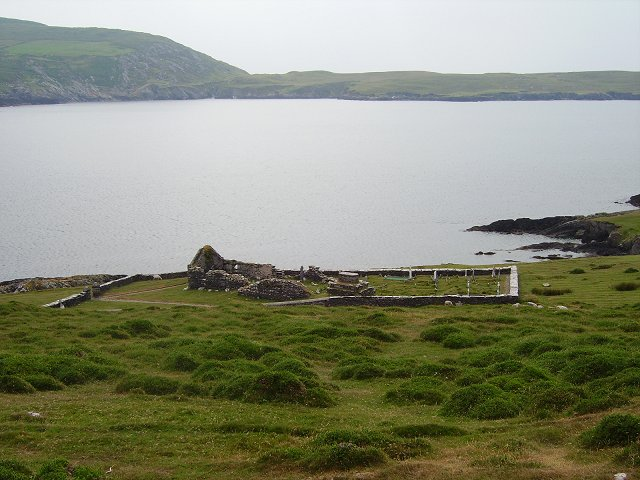
Ecclesiastical ruins and graveyard at Ballynacallagh

Ju 88 memorial sign on the mainland next to Dursey cable car

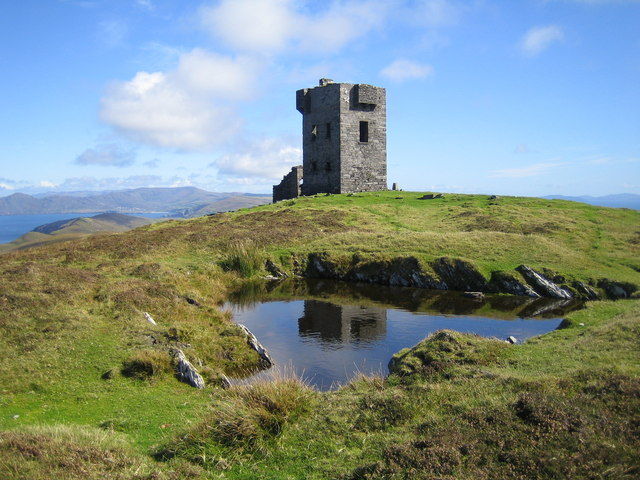
Napoleonic era signal tower

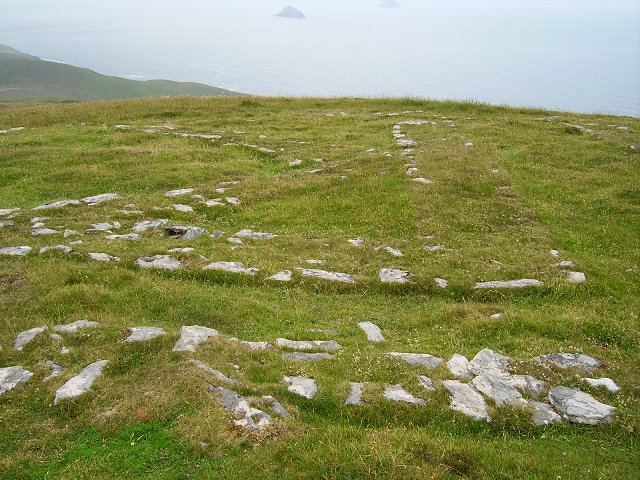
Remains of World War II "EIRE" neutrality sign

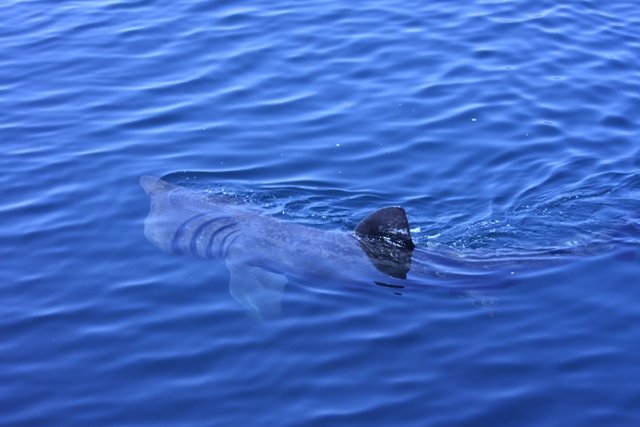
A basking shark feeds in the Dursey Sound.
