= E8 European long distance path =

European long-distance path

Coordinates: 48°54′23″N 19°52′10″E

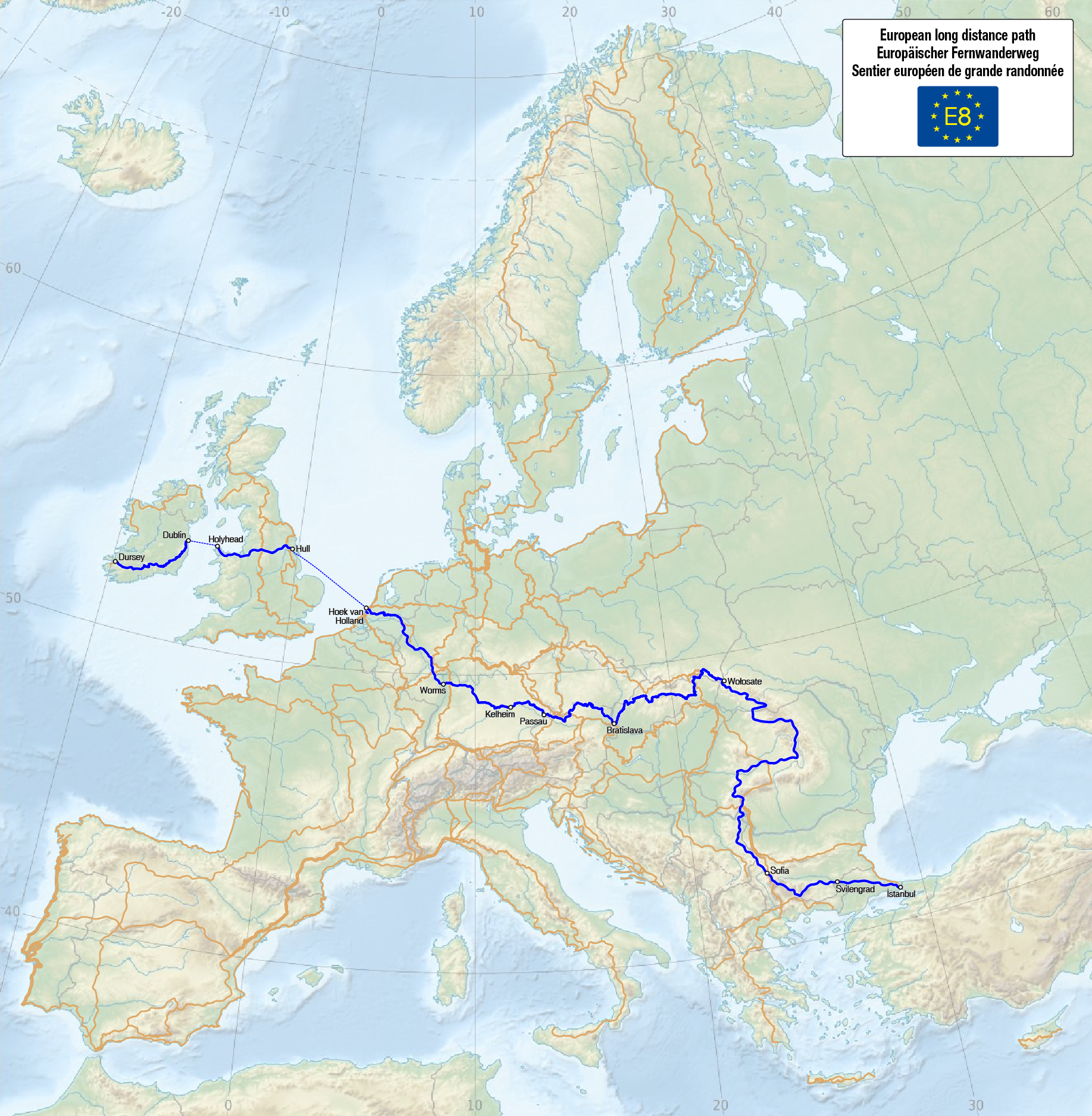
The European walking route E8

The E8 European long distance path or E8 path is one of the European long-distance paths, going over 6,000 km (3,700 mi) across Europe, from Dursey Island in County Cork, Ireland, to Bulgaria and is meant to continue to Istanbul in Turkey.

== Route ==
After Ireland it crosses the Irish Sea into England, where it follows part of the Trans Pennine Trail. After crossing the North Sea, it passes through the Netherlands, Germany, Austria, Slovakia, Poland, Ukraine, Romania and Serbia. It finally crosses Bulgaria before reaching the border to Turkey.

== History ==
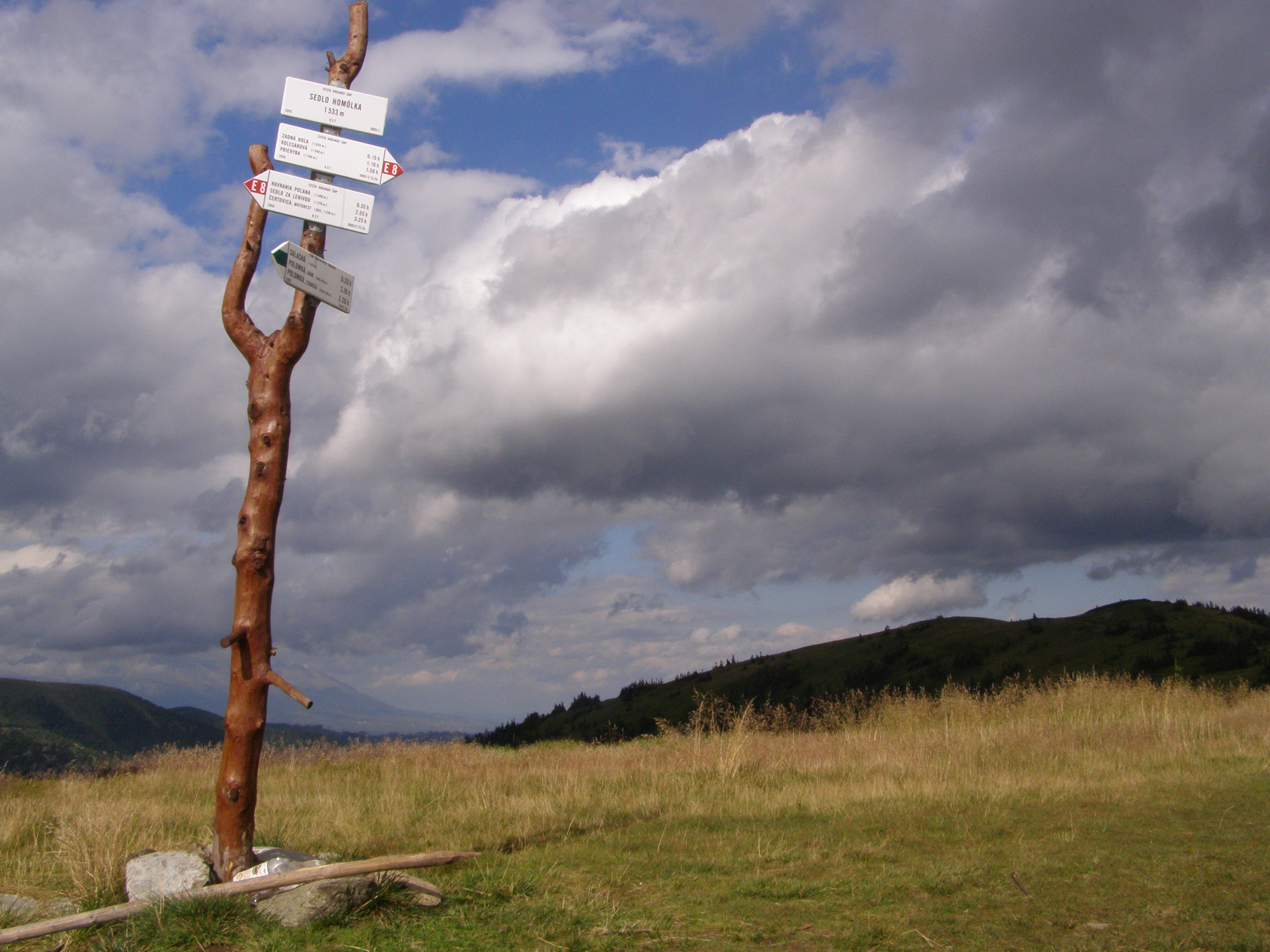
In Slovakia

It was the first European long-distance path to be designated, and opened, in the UK. The section was opened in 1996.

Some of the eastern sections of the route in Ukraine, part of Bulgaria, and Turkey are yet to be finalised.
