= Southside, Dublin =

The Southside
- Informal region (Dublin, south of the Liffey)
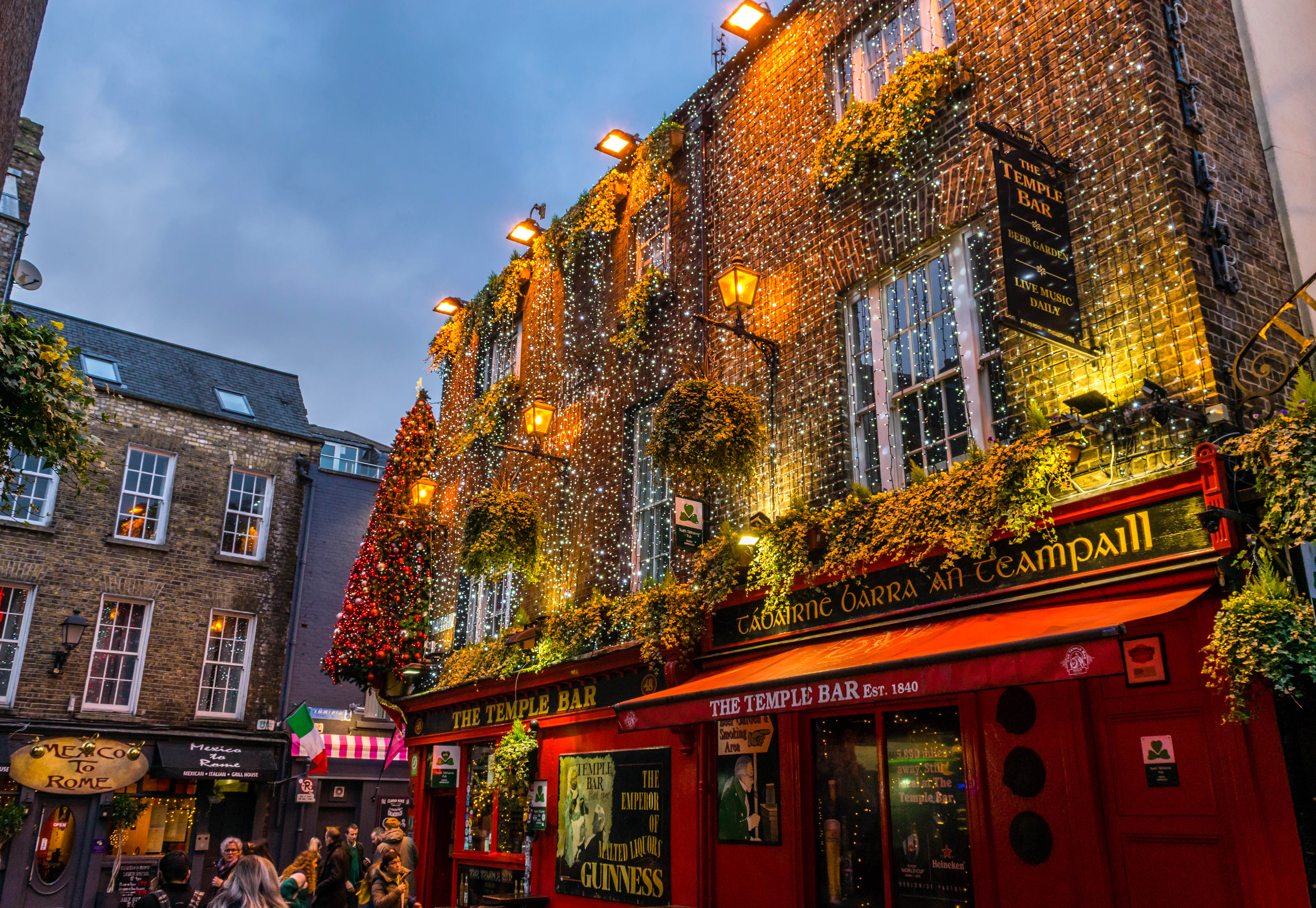
- Temple Bar
- Country: Ireland
- County: Dublin
- City: Dublin

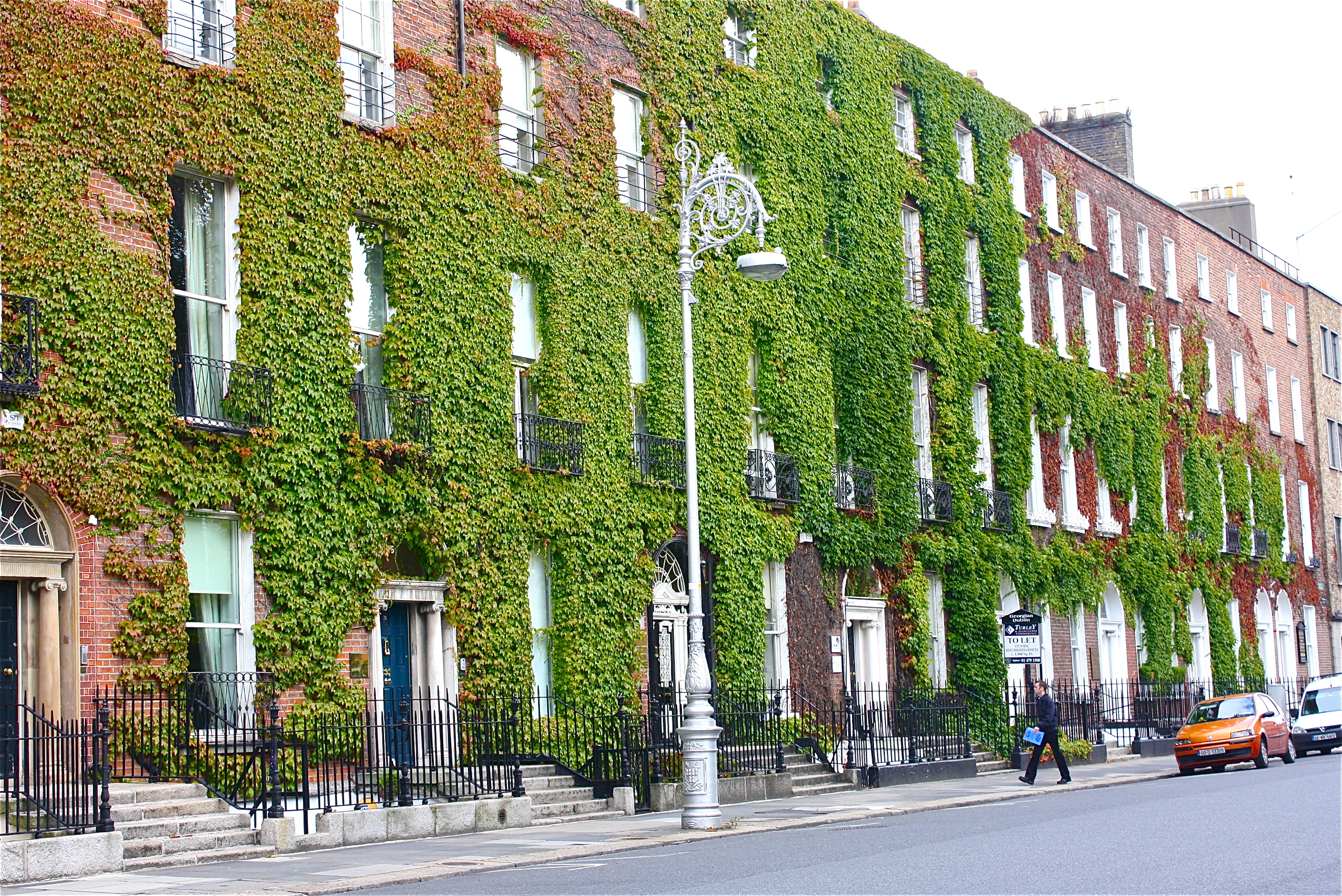
Georgian buildings on Merrion Square. Traditionally, these townhouses were the city homes of the aristocracy during the social season.

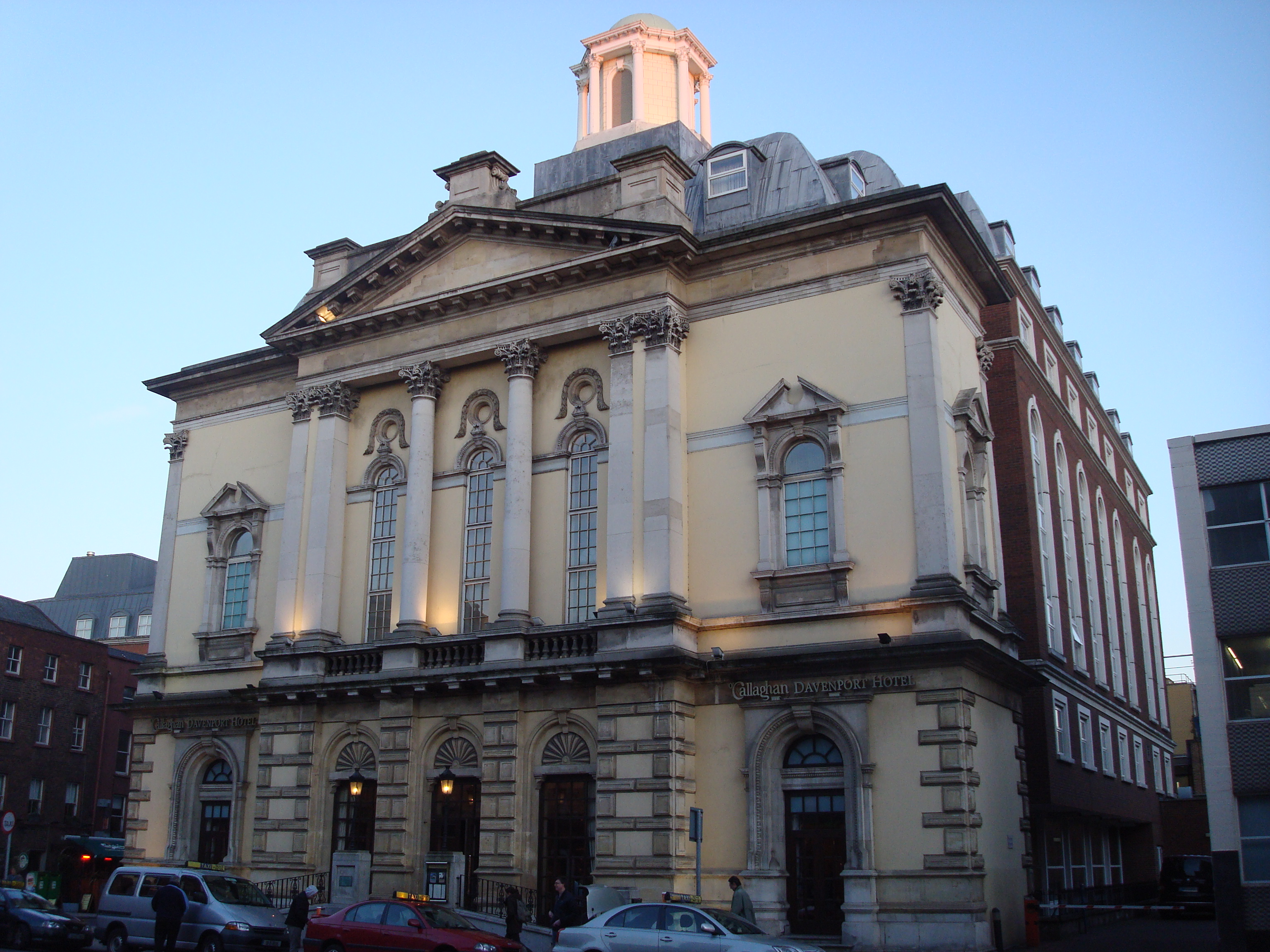
The Davenport Hotel near Merrion Square in the city's D2 district.

The Southside (Irish: Taobh Ó Dheas) is the part of Dublin city that lies south of the River Liffey. It is an informal but commonly used term. In comparison to the city's Northside, it has historically been regarded as wealthier and more privileged, with several notable exceptions. Malahide, one of the wealthiest areas in Ireland, is on the Northside, for example, whereas low-income districts such as Jobstown and Sallynoggin are part of the Southside.

== Areas of the Southside ==
The Southside includes Dublin city centre south of the Liffey, including Grafton Street and other notable streets, and also inner city areas such as The Liberties / The Coombe and Temple Bar.

Beyond the city centre, the Southside (in the geographical sense) includes the districts named here, most of the names being old, though many were until recent times rural townlands:

- Adamstown
- Ballinteer
- Ballsbridge
- Ballyboden
- Ballybrack
- Ballyfermot
- Ballymount
- Ballyroan
- Belfield
- Blackrock
- Bluebell
- Booterstown
- Cabinteely
- Cherrywood
- Churchtown
- Citywest (business park)
- Clondalkin
- Clonskeagh
- Cornelscourt
- Crumlin
- Dalkey
- Deansgrange
- Dolphin's Barn
- Donnybrook
- Drimnagh
- Dundrum
- Dún Laoghaire
- Edmondstown
- Firhouse
- Foxrock
- Glasthule
- Glenageary
- Glencullen
- Goatstown
- Greenhills
- Harold's Cross
- Inchicore
- Irishtown
- Jobstown
- Killiney
- Kilmacud
- Kilmainham
- Kilternan
- Kimmage
- Knocklyon
- Leopardstown
- Loughlinstown
- Lucan
- Milltown
- Monkstown
- Mount Merrion
- Newcastle
- Park West
- Palmerstown
- Ranelagh
- Rathcoole
- Rathfarnham
- Rathgar
- Rathmichael
- Rathmines
- Rialto
- Ringsend
- Rockbrook
- Saggart
- Sallynoggin
- Sandycove
- Sandyford
- Sandymount
- Shankill
- Stepaside
- Stillorgan
- Tallaght
- Templeogue
- Terenure
- Walkinstown
- Whitechurch
- Windy Arbour

== See also ==
- Dublin 4
- List of Eircode routing areas in Ireland
