= Cruagh =

Civil parish in County Dublin, Ireland

Cruagh An Chraobhach
- Location in Ireland
- Coordinates: 53°14′05″N 6°18′01″W
- Country: Ireland
- Province: Leinster

Area
  - Total: 29.61 km^{2} (11.43 sq mi)

Population (2011)
  - Total: 3,967
  - Density: 134.0/km^{2} (347.0/sq mi)
- Website: www.cruagh.ie

Historical population
Year	Pop.	±%
1821	1,036	—
1831	1,216	+17.4%
1841	979	−19.5%
1851	770	−21.3%
1861	695	−9.7%
1871	512	−26.3%
1881	459	−10.4%
1891	474	+3.3%
1901	488	+3.0%
1911	489	+0.2%
1966	542	+10.8%
1971	554	+2.2%
1981	664	+19.9%
2011	3,967	+497.4%

Cruagh (Irish: An Chraobhach) is a civil parish in the barony of Uppercross in South Dublin, Ireland. It contains the townlands of Cruagh, Killakee, Tibradden, Glendoo, Newtown, Jamestown, Woodtown and Orlagh. It is situated south of Ballyboden on the R116 regional road.

== Toponymy ==
The name of the parish derives from craobhach, meaning 'branches'. This ultimately comes from Old Irish croibech, or cráebach. The name in its current form was first recorded in 1641.

The area was commonly known as 'Creevagh' or 'Crevagh' until the 19th and, on occasion, the early 20th century.

== Early history ==
The area has been inhabited since the Neolithic period, evident by the chambered cairn situated atop nearby Tibradden Mountain. It is likely that this settlement in the area continued through the Bronze Age, due to the 2nd century BC cemetery uncovered during the 1950s in Edmondstown.

Around 460 AD a small church was built in what is now the old section of Cruagh Cemetery. It was likely built by Dalua, a 5th-century saint and disciple of Saint Patrick. In 1184 the church was granted by Prince John to the Archbishop of Dublin. The church was served by the Vicar of Tallaght until c.1700, when turbulent times in Ireland and the eventual union of parishes led to its falling into lay hands and finally disuse. The ruins were noted by John Canon O'Hanlon in the 1870s and today little remains of the church.

== Townlands ==
There are 8 townlands contained in Cruagh, the largest by population being Newtown

Townland Name	Acres	Population
Cruagh	948.50	204
Glendoo	929.44	---
Tibradden	849.12	123
Killakee	659.45	81
Woodtown	495.82	1287
Newtown	452.42	2272
Jamestown	94.25	---
Orlagh	41.63	---
Total	4470.63	3967

=== Tibradden ===
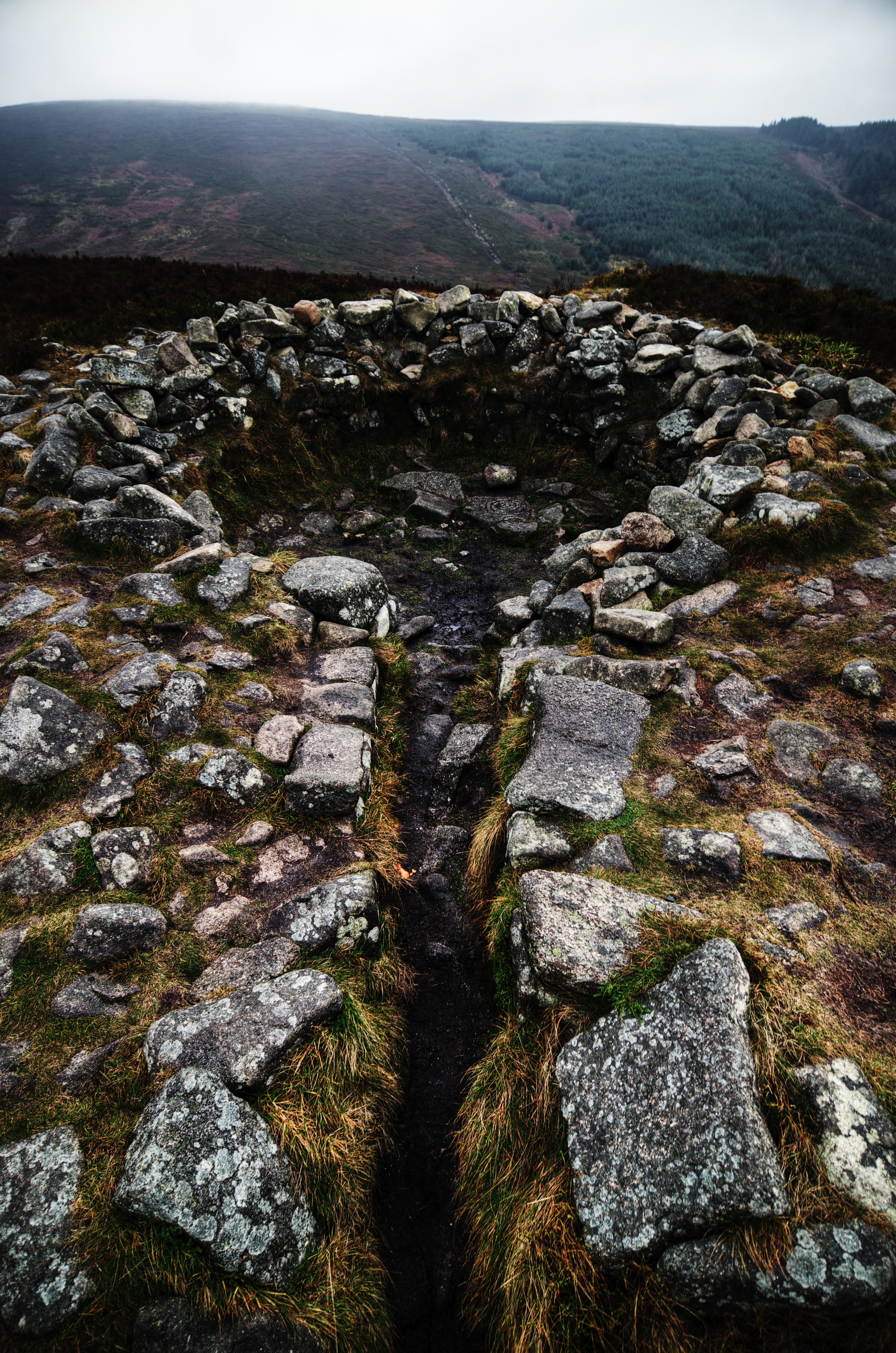
The cairn at Tibradden

Tibradden is home to several points of interest, one of which is a rock where Daniel O’Connell gave an address to the locals as they celebrated Garland Sunday in 1843. Also situated here is Tibradden House, which was constructed in 1859 as a wedding present for Mary Davis, whose descendants occupy the house today. Close to the summit of Tibradden Mountain is a 4000-year-old chambered cairn. It was excavated in 1849 by the Royal Irish Academy who found a stone-lined cist containing a pottery vessel and cremated remains.

=== Woodtown ===
With a history dating back to the 16th century, the area has two historic buildings; Woodtown Park and Woodtown Manor. Woodtown Park was built around 1700 as a farm house. In 1896 the Reverend Walter A Hill started a school here that was the first boarding school in Ireland which kept boys only up to the age of thirteen. It was once a residence of the MacNeill family and it is believed that final plans for the 1916 rising were drawn up here. Opposite is Woodtown Manor, built around 1720. The estate consisted of 132 acres, including a deer park. In 2014 it was listed for sale at €2.25 million. In 2003, the DSPCA relocated to their center at Mount Venus, a state-of-the-art facility offering shelter and care to a wide variety of animals.

=== Cruagh ===
Cruagh itself is a small townland. As mentioned earlier the area was previously served by the church in Cruagh Cemetery, and in the early 19th century a watchtower was constructed partly on the site of the church. A sentry was employed there to prevent body snatching to occur. This was common at the time due to the lack of cadavers available. The old section of the cemetery was in use from the early 1700s to the mid 20th century. An 1839 issue of the Dublin Weekly Register says that “The mortal remains of the Archbishop of Tuam were this day deposited in the family vault at the ancient church-yard of Cruagh”, although no family vault there can be found. A new section was opened around 1945, although today it is currently full. Next to the entrance to the cemetery is a former subscription school which served the area in the 19th century, and was built sometime before 1833. It was converted into a home in the 1970s. The area also contains Cruagh Wood, which at 522m boasts a great view of Dublin City and its surroundings. In 1659, Cruagh had a population of 22 (only 3 being Irish), and by 1851 180 lived there. By 1911, the population was 64 although a century later it is 204.

=== Orlagh ===
Just below the ruins of the Hell Fire Club in Killakee, lies the house now known as Orlagh. It was constructed in 1790 and was sold to the Augustinian Order in 1872. Eoin MacNeill was given refuge and slept in the college for the first few days of the Easter Rising. Famous visitors to the house include Patrick Pearse and Daniel O’Connell. Today, it is a retreat and conference centre run by the friars. In a field opposite is a famous well of the area that was unveiled in 1920. Crowds of people came to the opening, which included a drum band and banners.

=== Glendoo ===
Glendoo is an area near Tibradden that is relatively devoid of houses, as it was in 1837 when it is described as having "a great quantity of turf with only one house in which Mr. White's gamekeeper lives." At 586 metres, Glendoo Mountain is typically featureless and the summit partially crosses the Wicklow-Dublin border.

=== Newtown ===
Newtown, bordering Killakee to the south and Woodtown to the west, begins at Mount Venus Cemetery and ends at Boden Park estate. In the 19th century it was home to a number of mills. Edmondstown National School is built on the site of Newtown Great Paper Mill, founded early in 19th century and at one time employed over 600. Next are the ruins of Newtown Little Paper Mill which was built in 1757. This was converted into a cloth mill later and it ceased operation around 1836.

=== Jamestown ===
Jamestown contains only several houses, and is mostly farmland. The townland border follows Masseys Wood for its whole length. Little is known of its history although during the Irish Rebellion of 1641 it suffered heavy losses of goods and cattle.

== Gallery ==
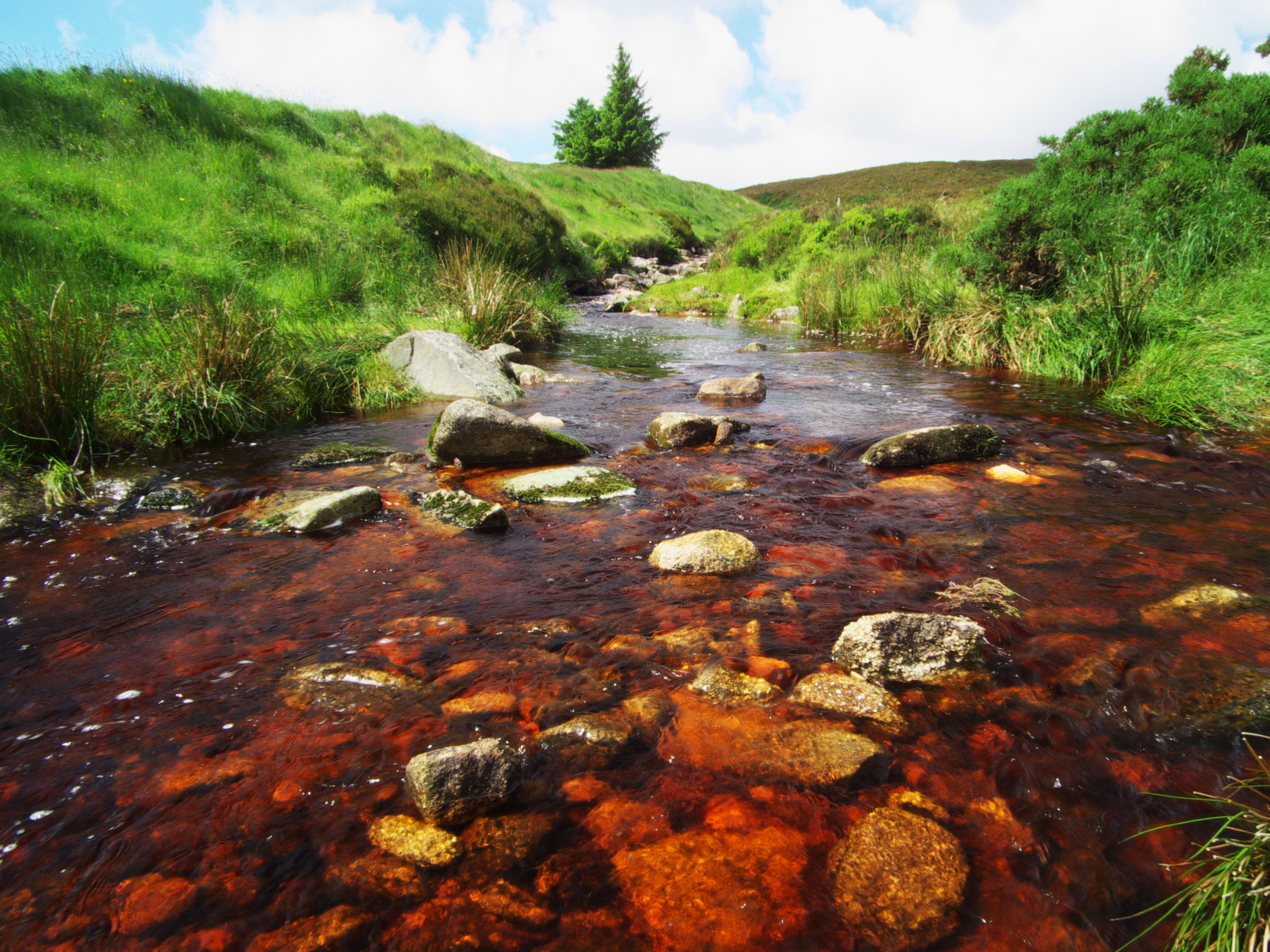
Stream near Cruagh Wood

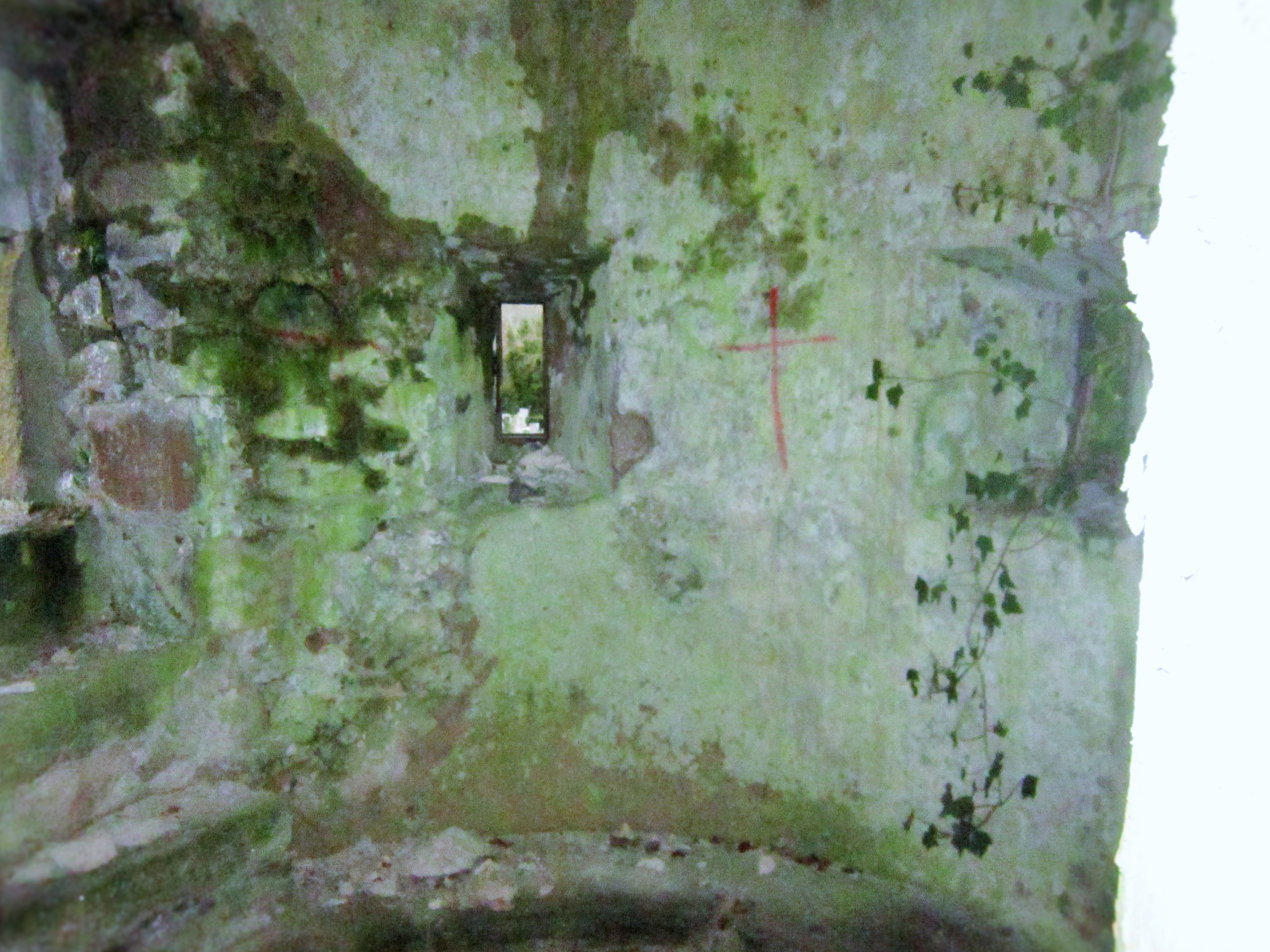
Inside the watchtower at Cruagh Cemetery

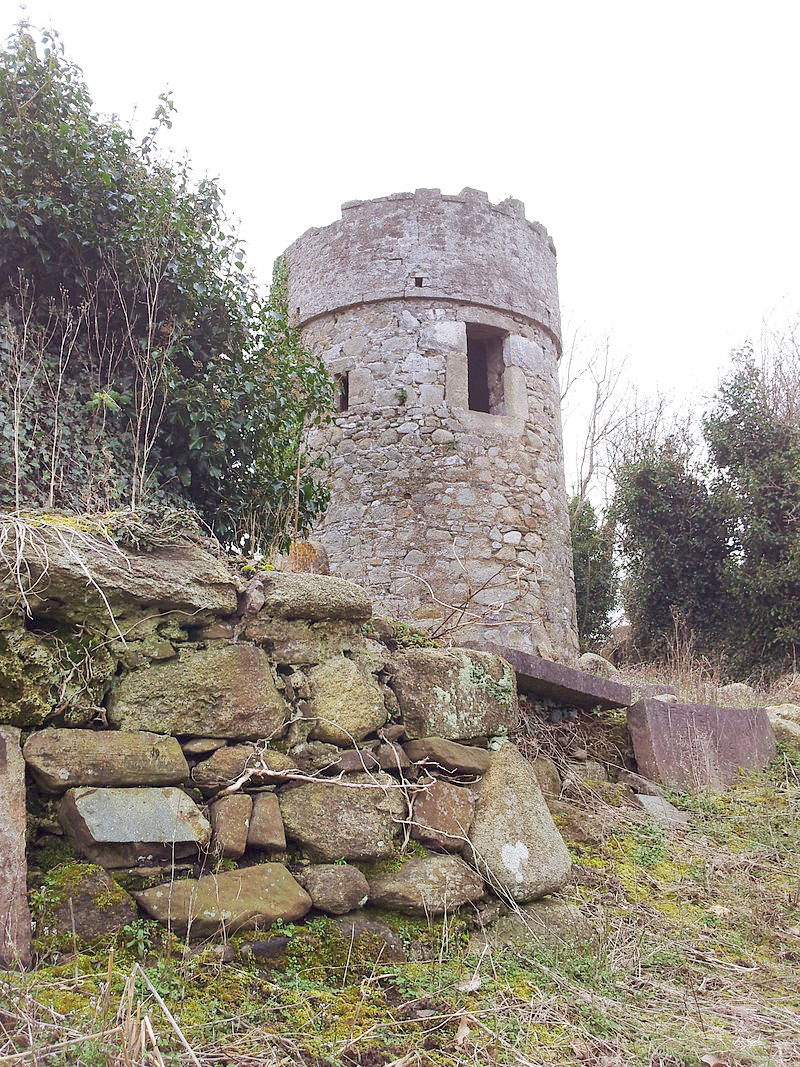
Cruagh watchtower with the remains of the church on the left

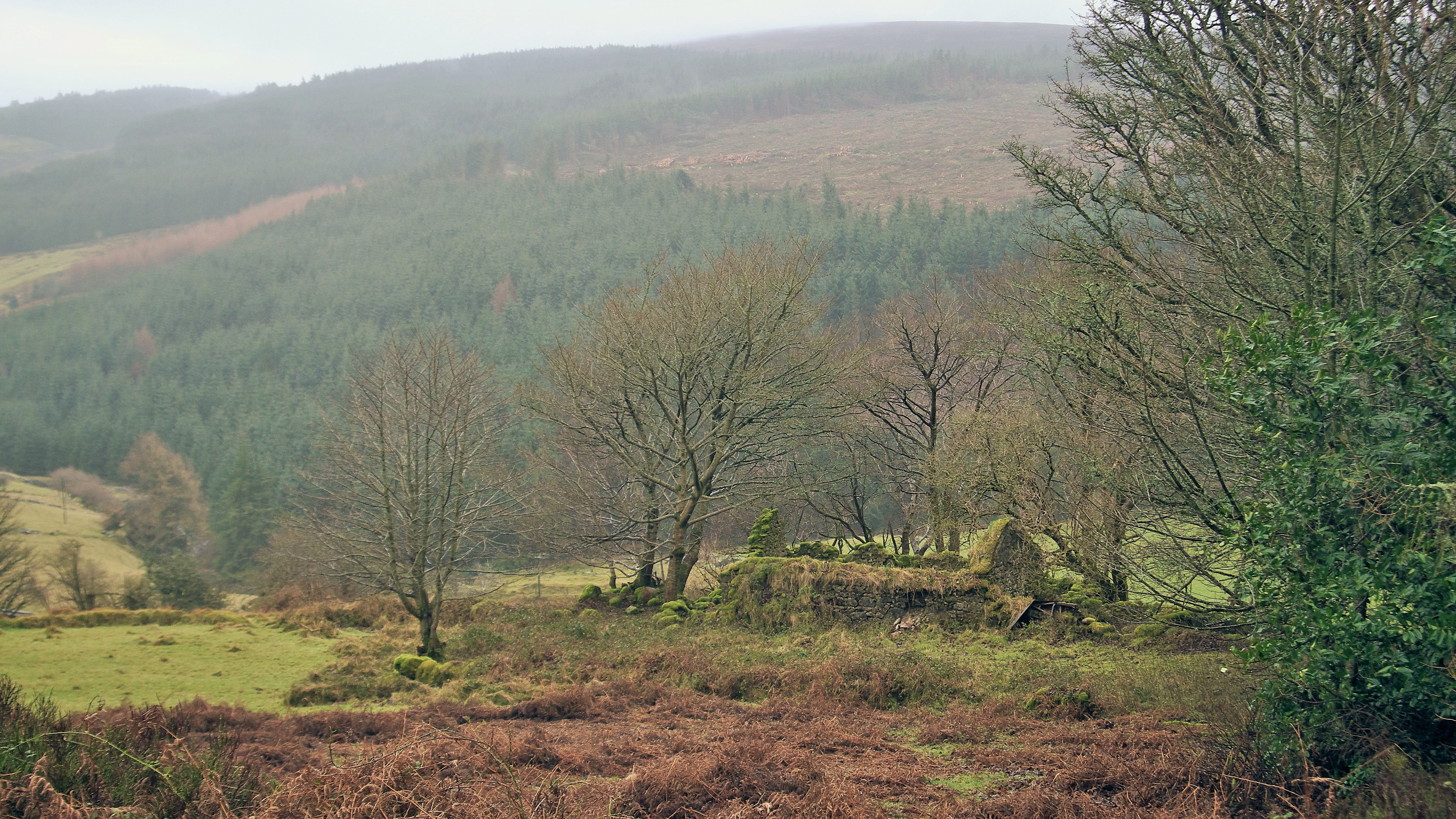
Ruin of small stone building near Glendoo
