= R817 road (Ireland) =

Suburban road in Dublin, Ireland

R817 road
- Bóthar R817
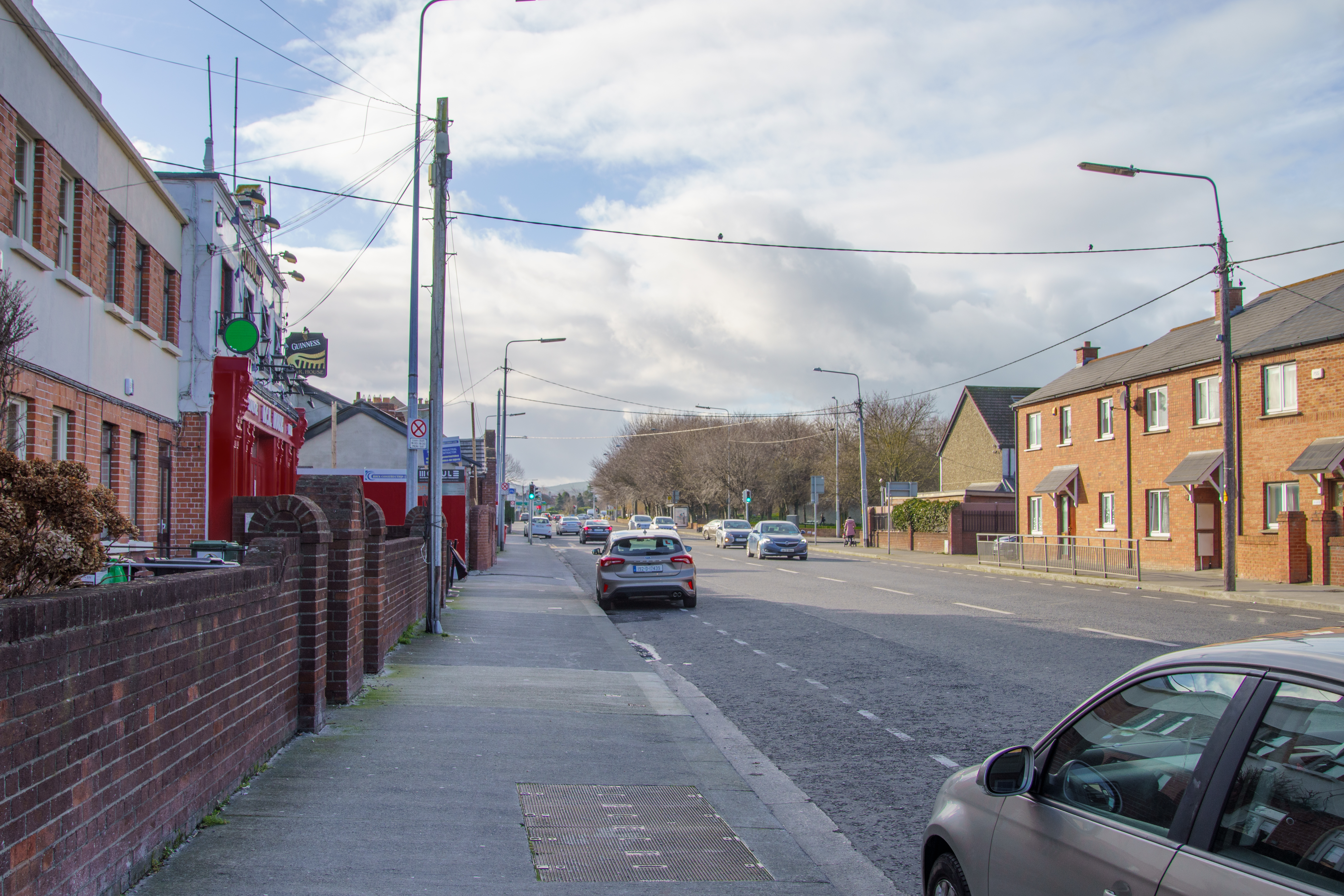
- Lower Kimmage Road, on the R817

Route information
- Length: 6 km (3.7 mi)

Location
- Country: Ireland
- Primary destinations: Dublin City; Harold's Cross (R137); Kimmage; South Dublin; Templeogue (R112), (R137), Crosses the River Dodder; Ballyroan (R114); Crosses the Owendoher River; Ballyboden (R115)

Highway system
- Roads in Ireland; Motorways; Primary; Secondary; Regional

The R817 road is a suburban road in south Dublin, Ireland connecting Harold's Cross to Ballyboden via Kimmage, Templeogue, and Ballyroan.

The official definition of the R817 from the Roads Act, 1993 (Classification of Regional Roads) Order, 2012 states:

R817: Harold's Cross - Ballyboden, County Dublin

Between its junction with R137 at Harolds Cross Road in the city of Dublin and its junction with R115 at Ballyboden Road in the county of South Dublin via Harolds Cross Road, Kimmage Road Lower and Fortfield Road in the city of Dublin: Wainsfort Road, Cypress Grove Road, Old Bridge Road and Ballyroan Road in the county of South Dublin.

The road is 6 kilometres (3.7 mi) long.

== See also ==
- Roads in Ireland
- Regional road
