= R115 road (Ireland) =

Road between Rathfarnham and Laragh in Ireland

R115 road
- Bóthar R115
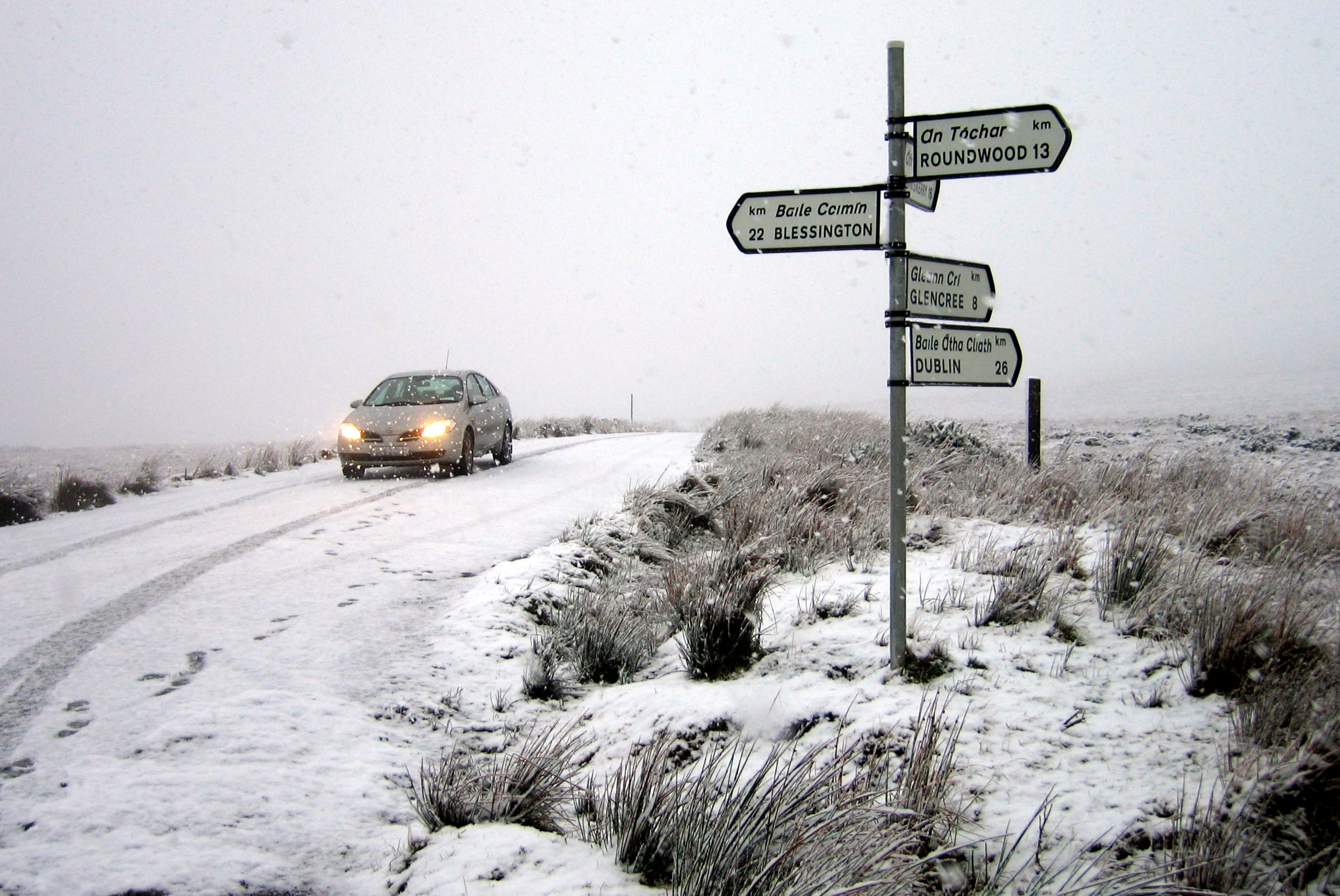
- Military Road joins the R759 at Sally Gap

Route information
- Length: 40.5 km (25.2 mi)

Location
- Country: Ireland
- Primary destinations: South Dublin; Rathfarnham (R114, R821); Ballyroan (R817); Ballyboden (R113, R116); Crosses the Owendoher River; Crosses the M50. No access to motorway.; County Wicklow; Glencree; Sally Gap (R759); Laragh (R755, R756)

Highway system
- Roads in Ireland; Motorways; Primary; Secondary; Regional

The R115 road is a regional road in counties Dublin and Wicklow in Ireland. It follows the Military Road (Irish: An Bóthar Míleata) for its entire length. The R115 is 40.5 km (25.2 mi) long; the full length of the Military Road (Rathfarnham to Aghavannagh) is 57.9 km (36.0 mi).

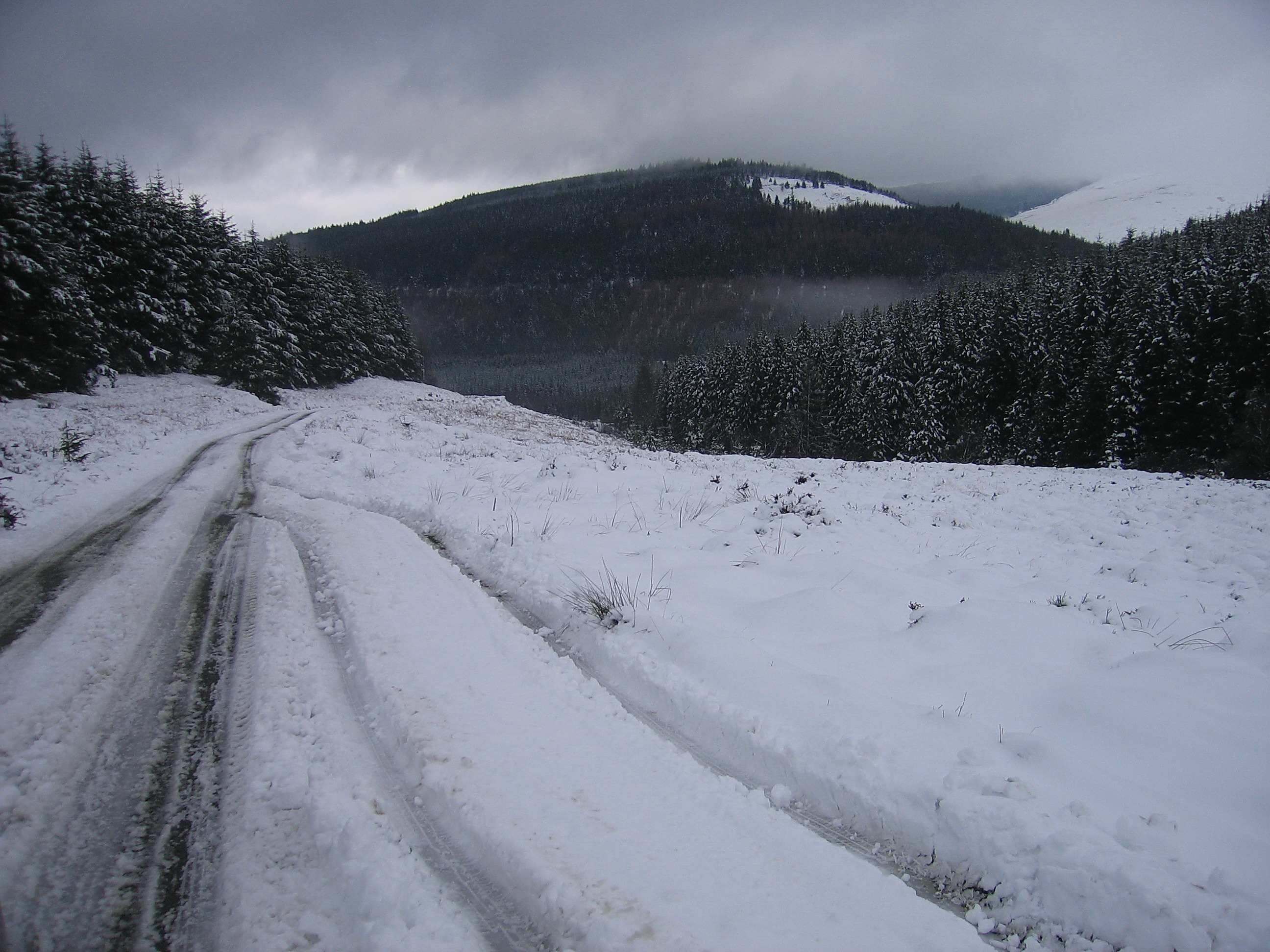
The Military Road between Laragh and Glenmalure; no longer the R115, just a local road

The Military Road runs north–south across the spine of the Wicklow Mountains. It was constructed between 12 August 1800 and October 1809, in the wake of the Irish Rebellion of 1798, to open up the mountains to Crown forces to assist them in tracking down United Irishmen insurgents who were hiding there. Rathfarnham itself was the scene of some skirmishes in the early days of the rising.

It was one of the first purpose-built roads in Ireland, excepting turnpikes. Four barracks were built along the way at Glencree, Laragh, Glenmalure, and Aghavannagh. The engineer in charge was Alexander Taylor (b. 1746), who was responsible for many other roads in the country, including some turnpike roads (toll roads).

== Route ==
The official definition of the R115 from the Roads Act 1993 (Classification of Regional Roads) Order 2012 reads:

R115: Rathfarnham, County Dublin - Laragh, County Wicklow

Between its junction with R114 at Butterfield Avenue Rathfarnham in the county of South Dublin and its junction with R755 at Laragh in the county of Wicklow via Grange Road, Willbrook Road, Ballyboden Road, Scholarstown Road, Stocking Lane and Military Road in the county of South Dublin: Glencree, Liffey Head Bridge, Sally Gap and Drummin in the county of Wicklow.

=== Description ===
The R115 / Military Road starts in Rathfarnham, County Dublin, outside the Yellow House pub and continues to the Ballyboden roundabout, where it intersects with the R113; it then follows the Edmondstown Road for 100 metres where it meets the R116. At this point the route takes the Scholarstown Road and turns left onto Stocking Lane where it rises through the Dublin Mountains (past the Hell Fire Club), followed by a descent into Glencree at the head of the valley of the Glencree river, with a spur down that valley to Enniskerry, before rising again to the vicinity of the entrance gate/road to the TV mast at Kippure (this part of the Military Road is the highest paved public road in Ireland at 523 m). It descends slightly to the Sally Gap Crossroads (elevation 495 m)(53.137799°N 6.312166°W), where it intersects with the R759 road. From there it continues to a point east of Mullaghcleevaun Mountain (850 m) before descending to the village of Laragh, near Glendalough, via the scenic Glenmacnass waterfall.

The R115 terminates at Laragh, at a junction with the R755 and the 'Wicklow Gap' road, the R756. The Military Road continues south past Glenmalure to Aghavannagh in south County Wicklow, but is designated as a local road south of Laragh.

For many years, the road was used as the Sally Gap special stage in the Circuit of Ireland car rally.

The road was upgraded from the Dublin border to Sally Gap in 1942, by the 3rd battalion of the Construction Corps, to allow for the harvesting of peat and for post-war tourists. The route from Sally Gap to Laragh was apparently overgrown during this period but upgraded in 1956, along with the addition of a car park at Glenmacnass Waterfall.

== Filming location ==
Locations along the road have been used in the following films:

- The Gentle Gunman (1952), in which a "two-storey cottage and a garage with a petrol pump were built on the side of the road" near Glassamucky

== See also ==
- Wicklow Round
- Roads in Ireland
- Motorways in Ireland
- National primary road
- National secondary road
- Rathfarnham and the Military Road
- Ireland's first ski rescue

== Sources ==
- Fewer, Michael (2007). The Wicklow Military Road: History and Topography. Dublin: Ashfield Press. ISBN 978-1-901658-66-8.
