= R116 road (Ireland) =

Regional road in Ireland

R116 road
- Bóthar R116
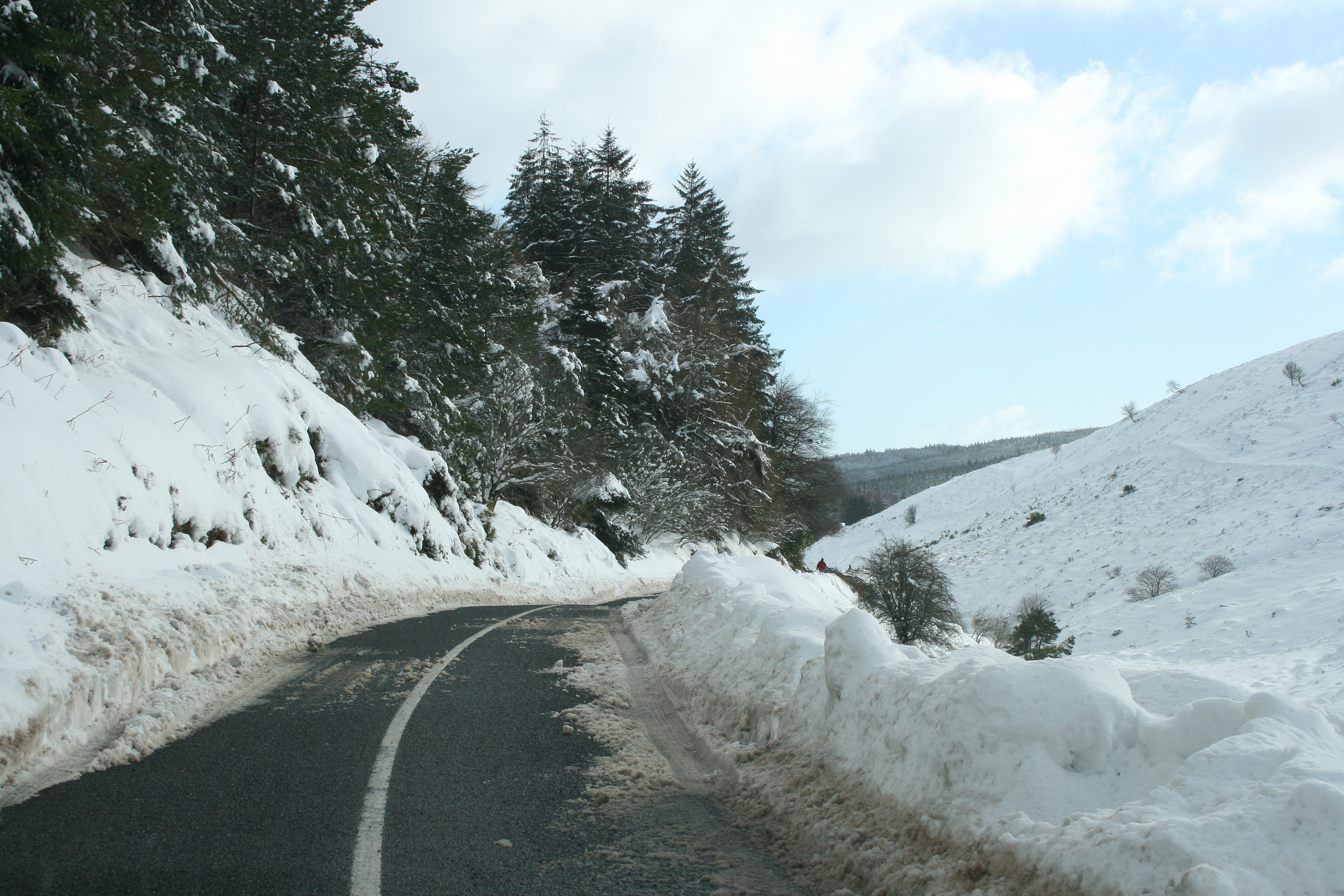
- R116 approaching Glencullen from the West

Route information
- Length: 19 km (12 mi)

Location
- Country: Ireland
- Primary destinations: South Dublin; Ballyboden (R115); Crosses the M50. No access to motorway.; Crosses the Owendoher River at Edmondstown, Cruagh Road (twice) and Pine Forest Road; Rockbrook; Dún Laoghaire–Rathdown; Glencullen; Kilternan (R117); Rathmichael; Crosses the M50. No motorway access.; Terminates at junction with N11

Highway system
- Roads in Ireland; Motorways; Primary; Secondary; Regional

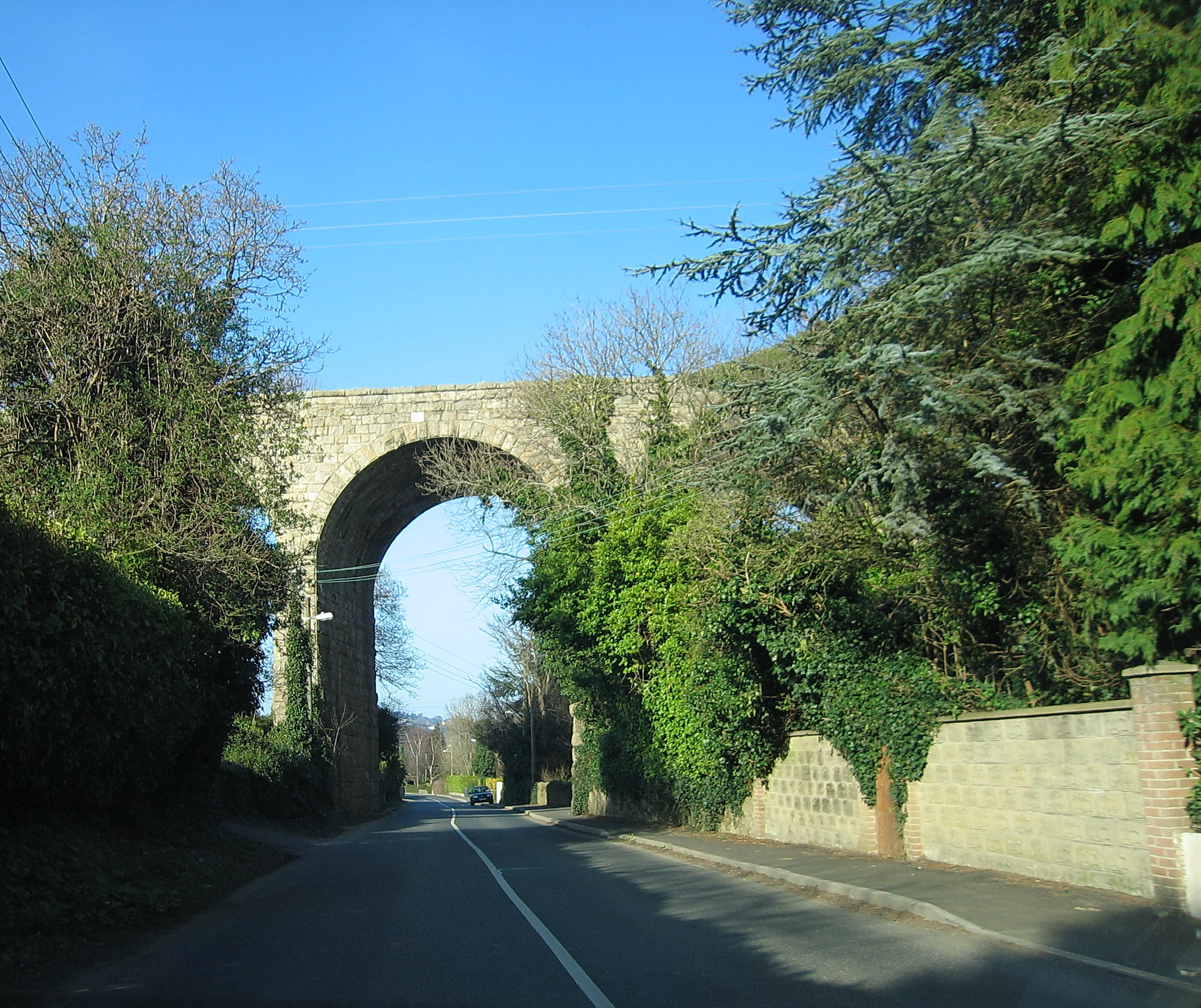
R116 Cherrywood Road in Loughlinstown

The R116 road is a regional road in Ireland which runs east–west from the N11 at Loughlinstown to the R115 in Ballyboden. It runs through the South of County Dublin for its entire length.

== Route ==
The official definition of the R116 from the Roads Act 1993 (Classification of Regional Roads) Order 2012 reads:

R116: Ballyboden - Loughlinstown, County Dublin

Between its junction with R115 at Scholarstown Road in the county of South Dublin and its junction with R117 at Kiltiernan in the county of DunLaoghaire — Rathdown via Edmondstown Road and Cruagh in the county of South Dublin: Tibradden, Glencullen and Ballybetagh all in the county of Dun Laoghaire — Rathdown

and

between its junction with R117 at Glenamuck South and its junction with N11 at Loughlinstown via Ballycorus Road, Rathmichael Road, Stonebridge Road, Mullinastill Road and Cherrywood Road all in the county of Dun Laoghaire — Rathdown.

=== Description ===
East-West: Starts at N11 Cherrywood Road and runs under the old Harcourt Street railway line viaduct and on through Brides Glen where it goes under the M50 and crosses over the Loughlinstown River. Proceeds east along Ballycorus Road to a junction with the R117 in Kilternan. Crosses the R117 at a staggered junction in Kilternan before climbing steeply SW up Ballybetagh Road to Glencullen.

Continues east along the northern side of a deep valley formed by Two Rock Mountain (536 m) and Tibradden Mountain to the north and Glendoo Mountain (586 m) to the south, where it reaches its high point of 287 m (1,263 ft). From the head of the valley it descends steeply through the Pine Forest and continues down through Rockbrook and Edmondstown (where it again passes underneath the M50) to its termination in Ballyboden where it meets the R115.

== Map of the route ==
- R116 Routemap

== See also ==
- Roads in Ireland
- National primary road
- National secondary road
