= Whitechurch, Dublin =

Remote semi-suburban area near Dublin, Ireland

Whitechurch An Teampall Geal (Irish)
- Remote suburban / rural area
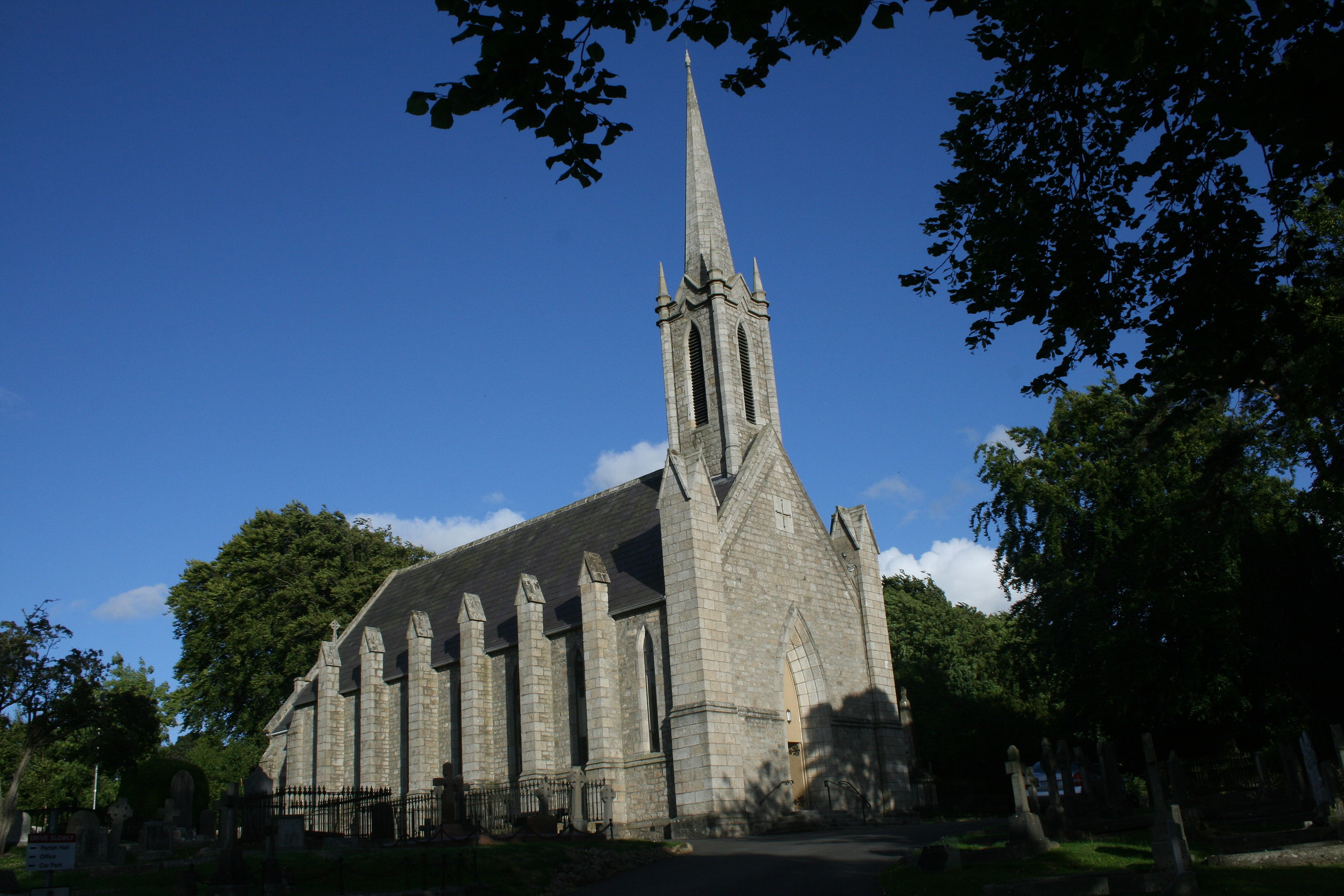
- Whitechurch Church of Ireland church dates from 1827

- Location in Ireland
- Coordinates: 53°10′N 6°10′W
- Country: Ireland
- Province: Leinster
- County: County Dublin
- Local government area: South Dublin
- Elevation: 54 m (177 ft)
- Time zone: UTC+0 (WET)
  - Summer (DST): UTC-1 (IST (WEST))
- Eircode routing key: D16

Whitechurch (Irish: An Teampall Geal) is a small suburban area on the southside of Dublin, in the local government area of South Dublin. It is situated south of Ballyboden, east of Edmondstown and west of Marlay Park. The greater part of the area lies north of the M50 semi-orbital motorway, with some remote parts merging into the mountainous districts of Tibradden and Kilmashogue south of the road, all at the foot of the Dublin mountains. Whitechurch is part of the greater Rathfarnham area. Whitechurch is also the name of a townland and civil parish.

== Name and history ==
The name of the area is derived its name from a small white church in Kilmashogue, built near an ancient cairn (which is a protected monument). Little remains of the church.

The Church of Ireland parish of Whitechurch includes most of wider Rathfarnham, including Tibradden, Larch Hill and Kilmashogue. There is a Moravian cemetery in the area which was the burial ground for the Moravian community, a Protestant sect from what is now the Czech Republic that arrived in Ireland in the 18th century. This community had a church in Kevin Street in central Dublin, but has now died out. A Catholic order, the Augustinian Fathers, have had a presence in the area for many years.

A Carnegie library was built in Whitechurch in 1911 and remains in operation.

There are 3 schools located in Whitechurch: St. Columba's College, a private, mostly boarding, secondary school, and two primary schools, Whitechurch National School (Church of Ireland) and Scoil Mhuire National School Roman Catholic, linked to the Good Counsel Parish, Ballyboden).

== See also ==
- List of towns and villages in Ireland
