= Dalua of Tibradden =

Saint Dalua of Tibradden
- Born: c. 430; Britain
- Died: c. 500; Dromiskin, County Louth
- Honoured in: Roman Catholicism
- Feast: 7 January

Dalua of Tibradden (Irish: Do-Lúe; Latin: Daluanus), also called Dalua of Craoibheach, was an early Irish saint who is said to have been a disciple of St. Patrick. He founded a church that became known as Dun Tighe Bretan (Tibradden) which is located today in the townland of Cruagh, County Dublin.

== Origins ==
Dalua was born in Britain in the early-mid 5th century. Information about his family may be found in the 9th century Book of Armagh, which discusses a 'DuLuae Chroibige'. This passage was interpreted by Professor John Gwynn as saying that Dalua was the brother of a certain Lonan. His father was named Senach and his mother was called Rigell. It has also been suggested that this Rigell was identical to Richella, the 5th sister of Saint Patrick.

== Life ==
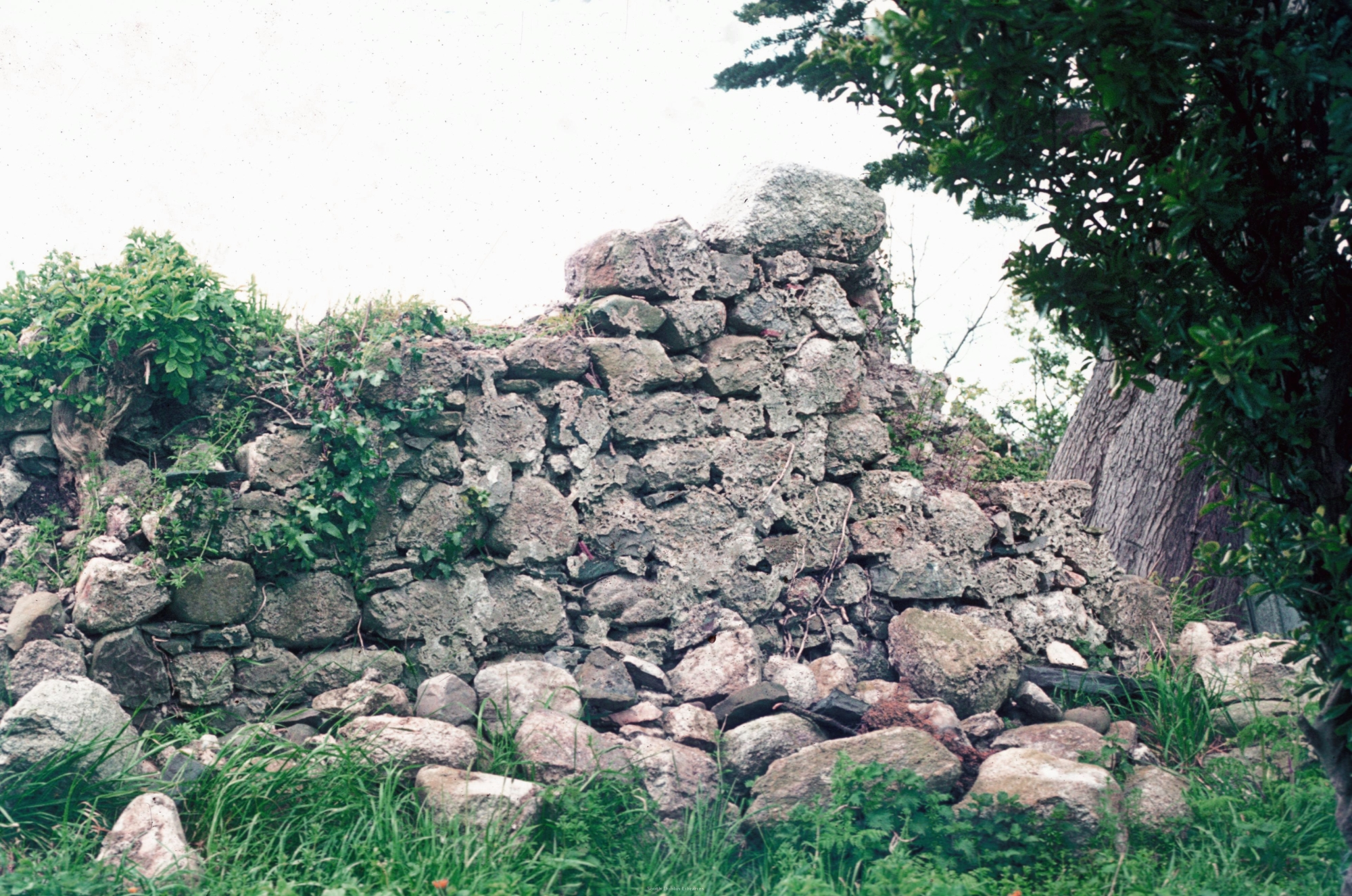
The remains of Dalua's church in Cruagh Cemetery

At some point in his life the saint came to Ireland, and while there he established his church of Tegh Bretan. The ruins of the stone church in the old section of Cruagh Cemetery (which remained active until c.1620) have long been associated with Dalua and it is likely this was the church he made.

Sometime later Dalua became a disciple of Saint Patrick. Patrick placed him and another disciple named Lugaid in Dromiskin, County Louth. Lughaidh was the son of Aengus mac Nadfraoch, the first Christian King of Munster and he later became the first bishop of Dromiskin. There, they established the monastery at Dromiskin; "[St Patrick] also erected a church, afterwards famous, which is called Druim-Inisclainn ... which two of his disciples, Da-luanus de Croebheach and Lugaid ... also made". Lugaidh died in 515 or 516 and Dalua is said to have died in Droimiskin, presumably before that time.

== 'Molua of Creevah' ==
It is possible that a saint named Molua (not to be confused with Mo Lua of Killaloe) of Creevah is identical with Dalua. This possibly arises as a former name of the Tibradden and Cruagh area was Creevagh up until the 19th century. In addition to that, this Molua in question was also called 'a pilgrim of the Britons' in the Vita tripartita Sancti Patricii. Some scholars have considered the two saints identical, although this is not certain even with these indications.
