= Edmondstown =

Townland in County Dublin, Ireland

Edmondstown Baile Éamainn (Irish)
- Townland
- Location in Dublin
- Coordinates: 53°16′29″N 6°17′30″W
- Country: Ireland
- Province: Leinster
- County: County Dublin
- Elevation: 91 m (299 ft)

Edmondstown (Irish: Baile Éamainn), also historically called 'Ballyhamon', is a townland of Rathfarnham in County Dublin, Ireland. It is on the R116 regional road, south of Ballyboden and north of Rockbrook, in the valley of the Owendoher River, and is in the local government area of South Dublin. Edmondstown National School is a Catholic primary school which serves the local area and has an attendance of 103 students. It won an Active Flag and the STEM plaque of excellence in science, technology, engineering and maths.

Edmondstown Golf Course is on Edmondstown Road. The remains of 27 people were discovered in the 1950s at the golf course when work uncovered an Early Bronze Age cemetery.

It is the site of the Mount Venus megalith.
