= Rockbrook =

Area in County Dublin, Ireland

Rockbrook Sruth na gCloch (Irish)
- Area
- Location in Dublin
- Coordinates: 53°15′42″N 6°17′52″W
- Country: Ireland
- Province: Leinster
- County: County Dublin
- Local authority: South Dublin County Council
- Elevation: 54 m (177 ft)

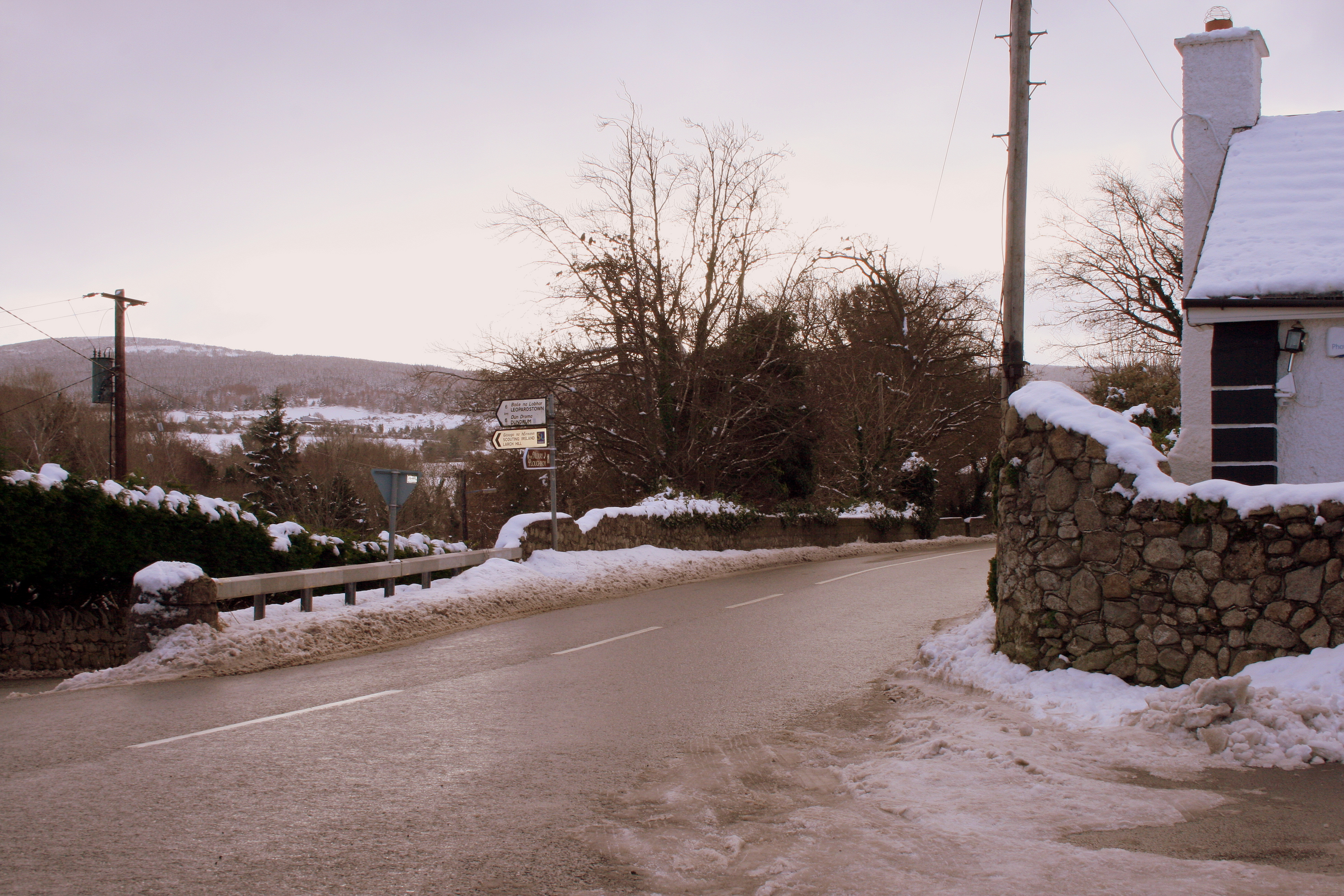
Rockbrook, County Dublin

Rockbrook (Irish: Sruth na gCloch) is a small area, once site of a small settlement, now semi-suburban, in County Dublin, Ireland. It is in the local government area of South Dublin.

== Location ==
Rockbrook is situated approximately 5 kilometres (3 mi) from Templeogue, south of Ballyboden, on the R116 regional road, which is Cruagh Road uphill and Edmondstown Road downhill. The area lies between Edmondstown, Tibradden and Whitechurch, within the civil parish of Whitechurch. The area is traversed by multiple streams within the Owendoher River system, including Glendoo Stream; there were several watermills in the vicinity.

== Amenities ==
Rockbrook Park School, located in the area, is a fee-paying boys secondary school which had an enrollment 167 as of January 2020. The school is located in Rockbrook House, a former country house built c. 1770. The ruin of Rockbrook Mill, a paper mill operated by a Quaker family until the 1830s, is nearby. Also located in the area is the Merry Ploughboy public house.

In and near the area are several cemeteries.
