= Kilternan =

Village in Dún Laoghaire–Rathdown, near Dublin, Ireland

Kilternan Cill Tiarnáin (Irish)
- Village
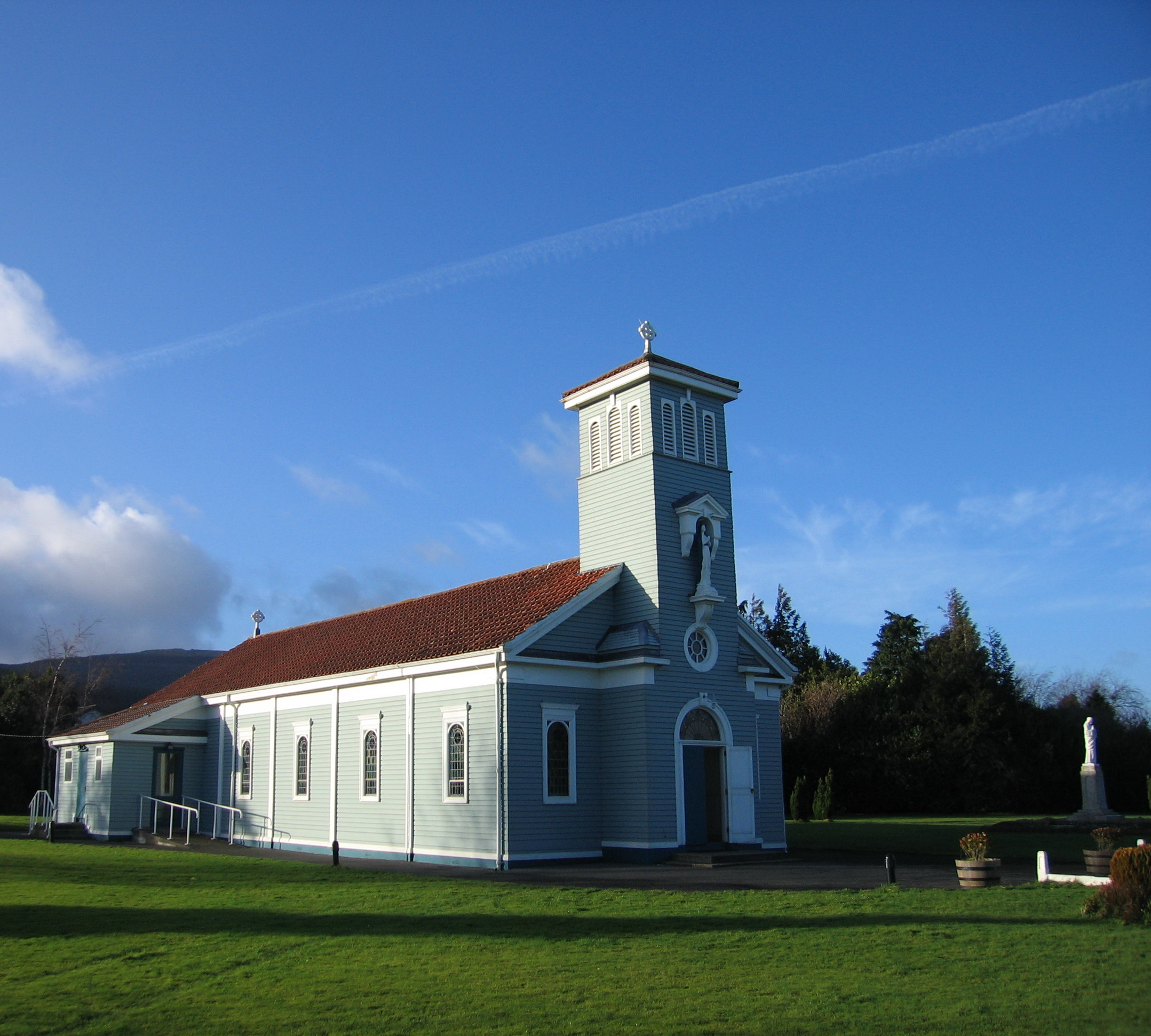
- Our Lady of the Wayside 'The Blue Church' (1929)

- Location in Ireland Kilternan (Ireland)
- Coordinates: 53.2356°N 6.1934°W
- Country: Ireland
- Province: Leinster
- County: Dún Laoghaire–Rathdown
- Time zone: UTC+0 (WET)
  - Summer (DST): UTC+1 (IST (WEST))
- Eircode routing key: D18
- Telephone area code: +353(0)1

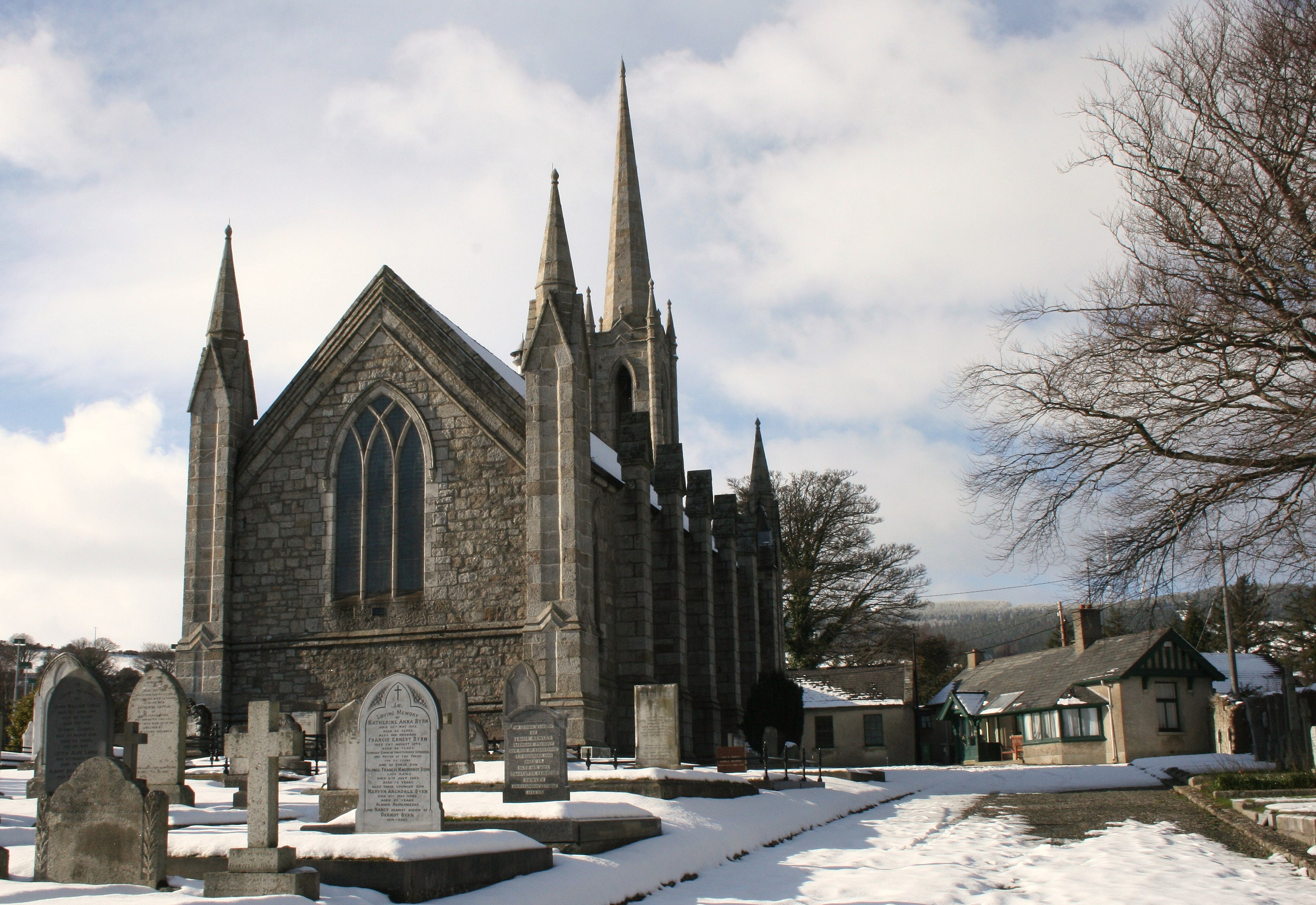
Church of Ireland parish church (1826)

Kilternan (Irish: Cill Tiarnáin, meaning 'Church of Tiarnán'), also known as Kiltiernan, is a village in Dún Laoghaire–Rathdown, in the foothills of the Wicklow Mountains south of Dublin, Ireland, near the border with County Wicklow. Kiltiernan is in a civil parish of the same name, in the barony of Rathdown.

== Location ==
Kilternan is a suburban village in rural surroundings at the crossroads of the R117 and R116 regional roads.

== Features ==
Kilternan's most notable buildings are the Church of Ireland Parish Church of Kilternan which dates from 1826, the timber-built Catholic Church of Our Lady of the Wayside (Blessed and Dedicated on 14 July 1929), or 'The Blue Church' as it is known locally after its Marian colour, and the Golden Ball pub. These names are joined at the local soccer club, Wayside Celtic whose ground is known as The Golden Ball. Kilternan is also home to two rugby clubs, De La Salle Palmerston and Old Wesley RFC known locally as Salmo and Wezz whose grounds are located at Kirwan Park (DLSP) and on the Ballycorus road (Wesley). Kirwan Park is located at the northern end of the village, while Ballycorus road is located at the southern end of the village. Kilternan is also home to Carrickmines Equestrian centre which is located on Glenamuck road. Kilternan lacks a traditional village centre or 'Main Street'. It is the location of Ireland's only (artificial) ski slope.

== Spelling of the name ==
Road signs are somewhat confused regarding the correct spelling of the name of the area. For example; signs on the M50 motorway (Junction 15) call it Kilternan while signs at the junction on the adjoining roads refer to "Kiltiernan", even though both sets were erected at roughly the same time. Local government documents and ordnance survey maps refer to Kiltiernan while many local people spell the name without the "i". Locally, Kilternan is the most acceptable form.

== Education ==
Kilternan has an adult education centre, as well as two primary schools located in close proximity to each of the village's two churches. The primary school at the southern end of Kilternan is called "Our Lady of the Wayside NS" while the primary school at the northern end of Kilternan is called the "Kilternan Church of Ireland Primary School." As of 2012, there are over 300 pupils in each of the schools.

== Transport ==
It is served by bus routes 44, L26 and 118.

== See also ==
- List of towns and villages in Ireland
