= Owendoher River =

River, largest tributary of the Dodder, Dublin, Ireland

Coordinates: 53°18′N 6°17′W

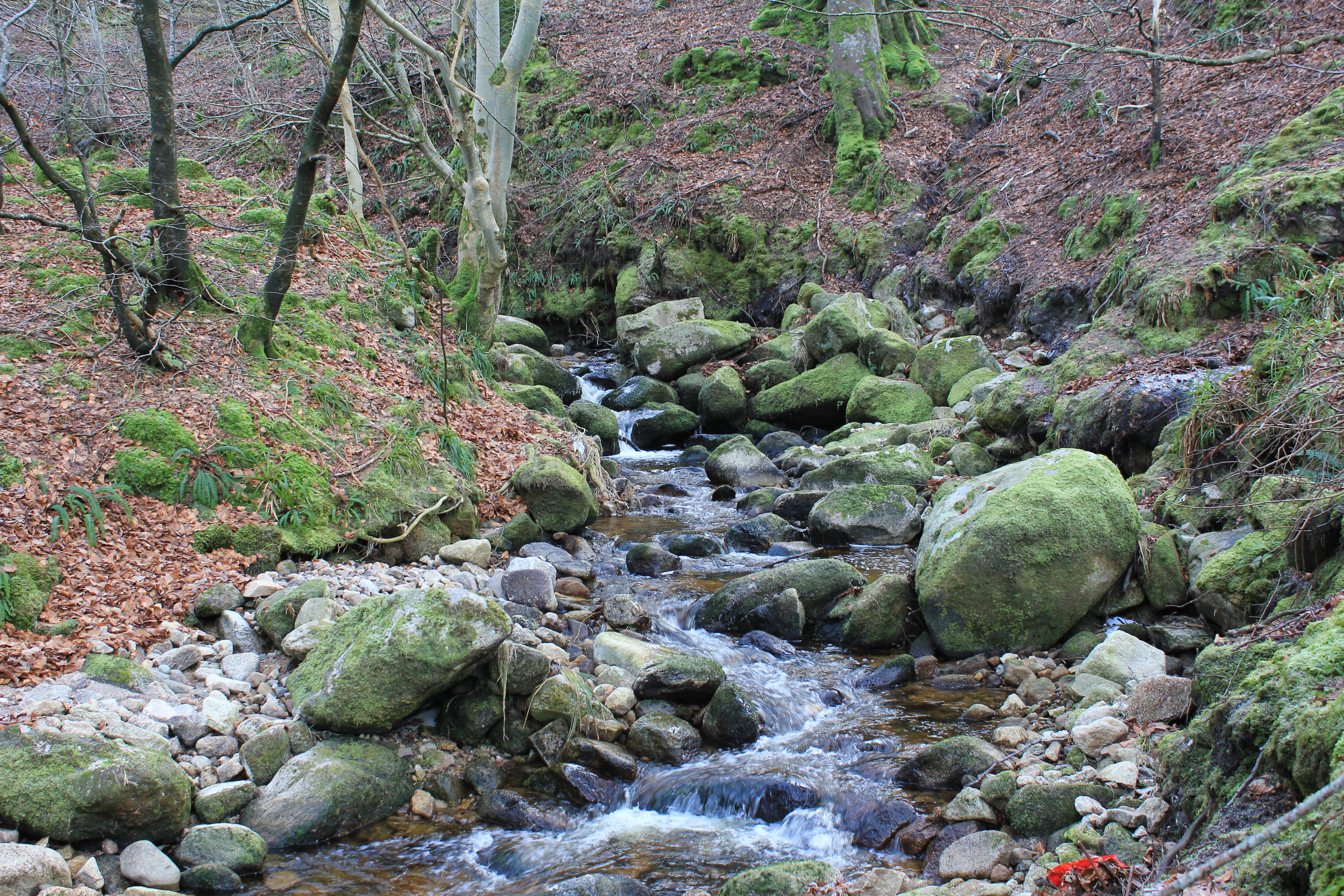
- Owendoher River near Cruagh Wood

Physical characteristics
- Source
  - location: Glendoo Mountain and Kilakee Mountain, County Dublin
- Mouth
  - location: River Dodder near Rathfarnham, ultimately Dublin Bay (River Liffey)

Basin features
- River system: River Liffey via River Dodder system
- Tributaries
  - right: Whitechurch Stream

The Owendoher River (Irish: An Dothra Bheag, i.e. "The Little Dodder") is a small river in southern County Dublin, Ireland, the largest tributary of the River Dodder, and a part of the River Liffey system.

== Course ==
The Owendoher rises in two main branches. The larger branch flows from Glendoo / Glencullen valley, and meets the second, in turn formed from two streams, one sometimes called Kilakee Stream, from the slopes of Killakee Mountain, and the other Glendoo Stream, from west of Glendoo Mountain. The two branches merge near Rockbrook Cemetery, along with another small stream from Woodbrook and Piperstown, and the Owendoher flows north to Ballyboden, and on to Rathfarnham, receiving the Whitechurch Stream.

The Owendoher joins the River Dodder south of Bushy Park near the former settlement of Butterfield, just south west of Rathfarnham village.

There were historically a number of mills on the Owendoher and its tributaries; none now operate.

=== Bridges ===
As the Owendoher now passes, in its lower reaches, through heavily developed areas, it features many bridges - from where the river joins with the River Dodder to its source in the south:

- Road bridge - Dodder View Road - R112
- Road bridge - Butterfield Avenue - R114
- Pedestrian bridge - Glenbrook Park to Willbrook Road
- Service road bridge - Otterbrook housing development
- Pedestrian bridge - Fairbrook Lawn to Willbrook Road
- Road bridge - Fairbrook Lawn to Willbrook Road/Ballyboden Road
- Service road bridge (gated) - beside Boden Wood housing development to Ballyboden Road
- Service road bridge - Boden Wood housing development to Ballyboden Road
- Service road bridge - Edenbrook Court housing development to Ballyboden Road
- Pedestrian bridge - Willowbank Drive to Ballyboden Road
- Road bridge - Ballyroan Road to Ballyboden Road - R817
- Abandoned bridge
- Service road bridge - Hillside Park housing development to Ballyboden Road
- Service road bridge - Owendoher Lodge housing development to Ballyboden Road
- Service road bridge - Private residence
- Service road bridge - Owendoher Haven housing development to Ballyboden Road
- Road bridge - Ballyboden Way to Taylors Lane/Ballyboden Road - R113
- Road bridge - Scholarstown Road to Ballyboden Road - R115
- Service road bridge - Springvale housing development to Edmonstown Road
- Pedestrian bridge - Springvale housing development to Edmonstown Road
- Pedestrian bridge (wooden) - Crossing at old clothes mill
- Pedestrian bridge (wooden) - 2nd crossing at old clothes mill
- Road bridge - M50
- Service road bridge - Private residence
- Service road bridge - Edmonstown national school to Edmonstown Road
- Road bridge - Edmonstown Road - R116
- Service road bridge - Kilmashogue Cemetery
- Service road bridge - Private residence
- Road bridge - Tibradden Road
- Road bridge - Cruagh Road (lower end) - R116
- Road bridge - Cruagh Road (upper end) - R116
- Road bridge - Pine Forest Road - R116

== See also ==
Rivers of Ireland

== Gallery ==
Photos of the Owendoher River
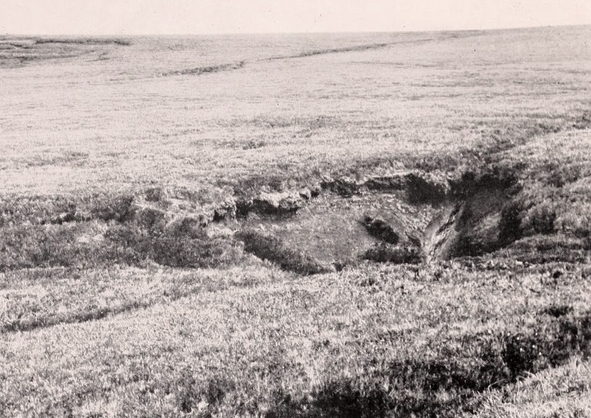
The river's source on Glendoo Mountain.

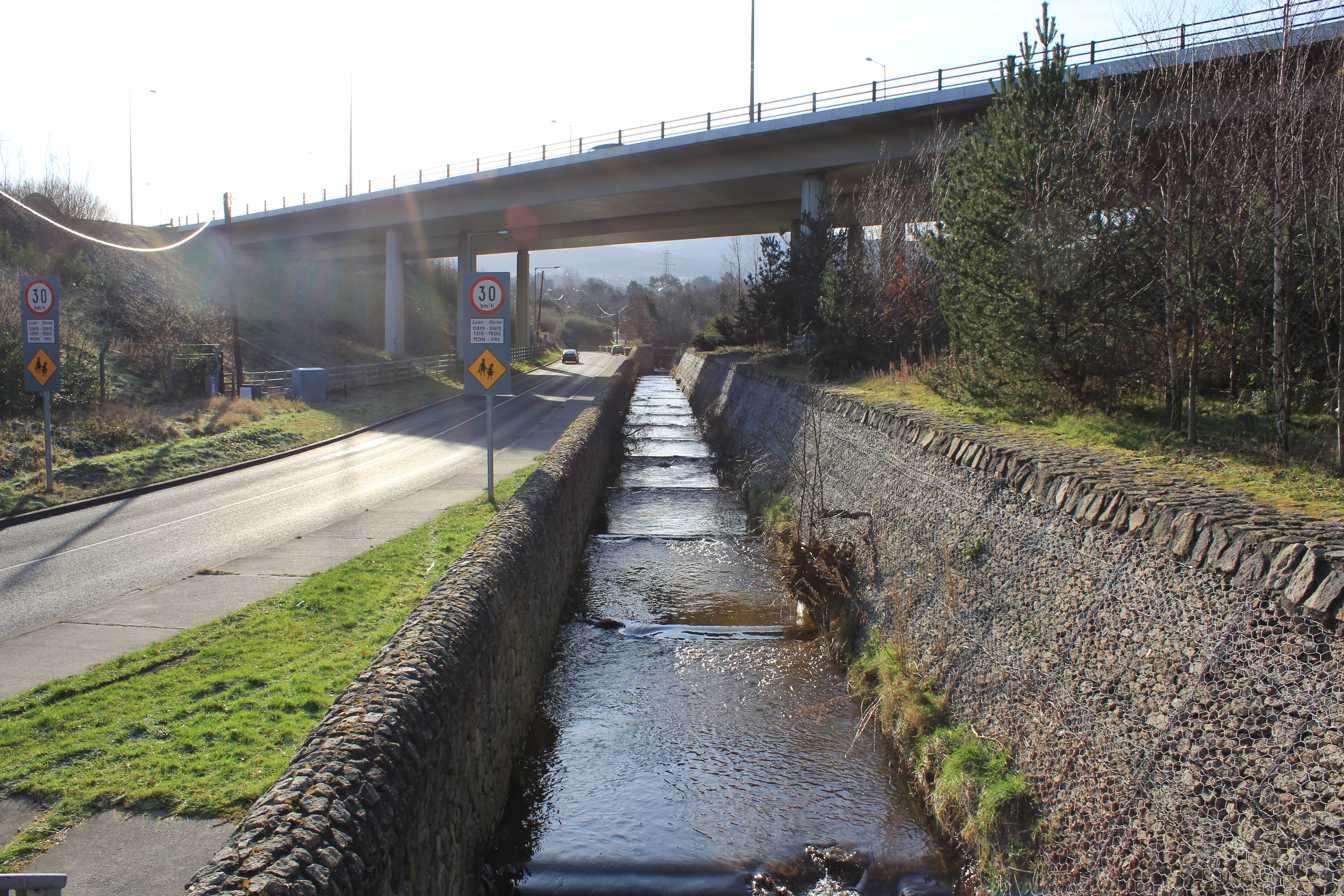
The Owendoher running under the M50 motorway.

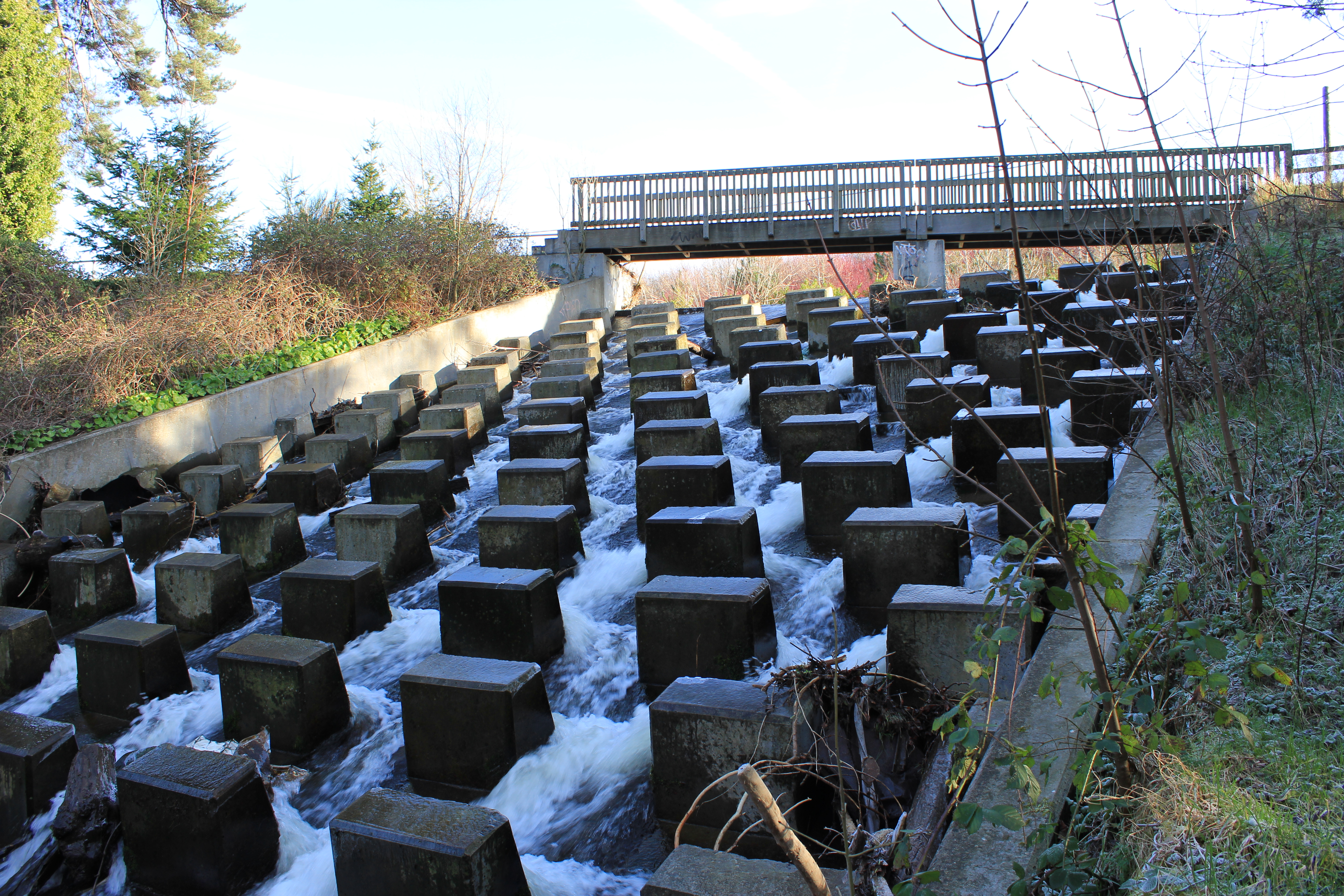
Stone structures in the Owendoher near the M50.

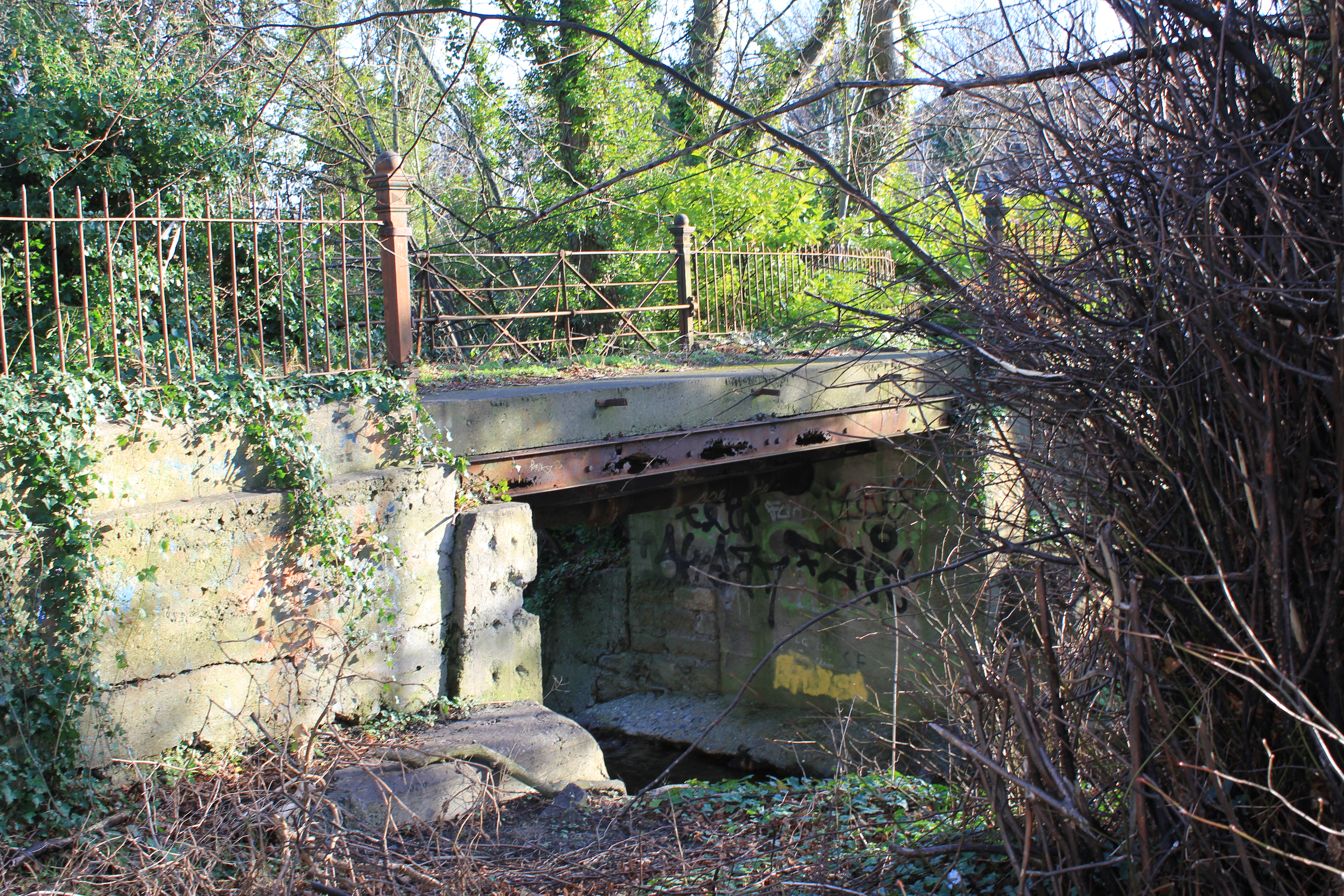
Abandoned bridge near Ballyroan.

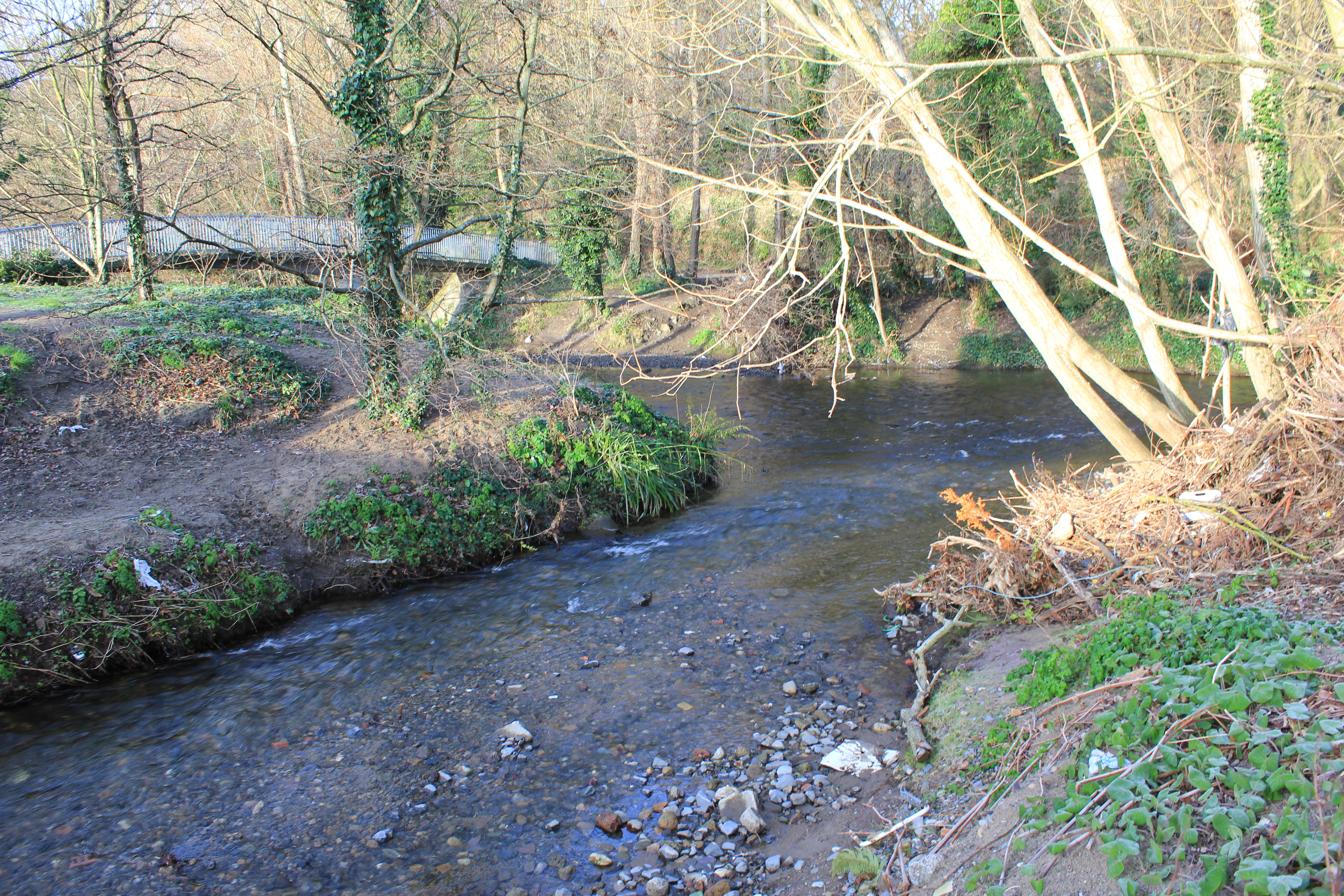
The Owendoher meets the River Dodder.
