= Mount Venus =

Megalithic site in Edmondstown, County Dublin, Ireland

Coordinates: 53°15′38.5″N 6°18′39.33″W

Mount Venus (or Cill an Véineas in Irish) is a megalithic site on the Mount Venus Road in Edmondstown, County Dublin, Ireland. It is a national heritage site.

It has been described by Borlase as one of the most magnificent in the world. It encompasses a massive capstone weighing in at 44 tons. It is partly collapsed on its supports and overgrown, and it has been suggested that this was a result of the 1755 Lisbon earthquake, as well as the 1690 Caernarfon earthquake. The capstone lies against a single large upright megalith.

When it was complete it would have been a 15 ft (4.6 m) high chamber entrance. Only one of the two great portal stones survives upright. The capstone has fallen and leans on this portal stone. The other portal stone (15 feet long) lies next to the monument. A third dressed stone 4 metres long by 1 metre wide lies in front. Borlase believed this to be a distinct class of tomb - an earth-fast dolmen, so-called from the capstone's contact with the ground at the back (another example being Aideen's Grave in Howth).

Access to this megalith is through a gap in a hedge beside the Dublin Society for Prevention of Cruelty to Animals on a site which was once a golf course.
