= Ballyroan, Dublin =

Suburban area in Dublin, Ireland

Ballyroan Baile Uí Ruáin (Irish)
- Suburb
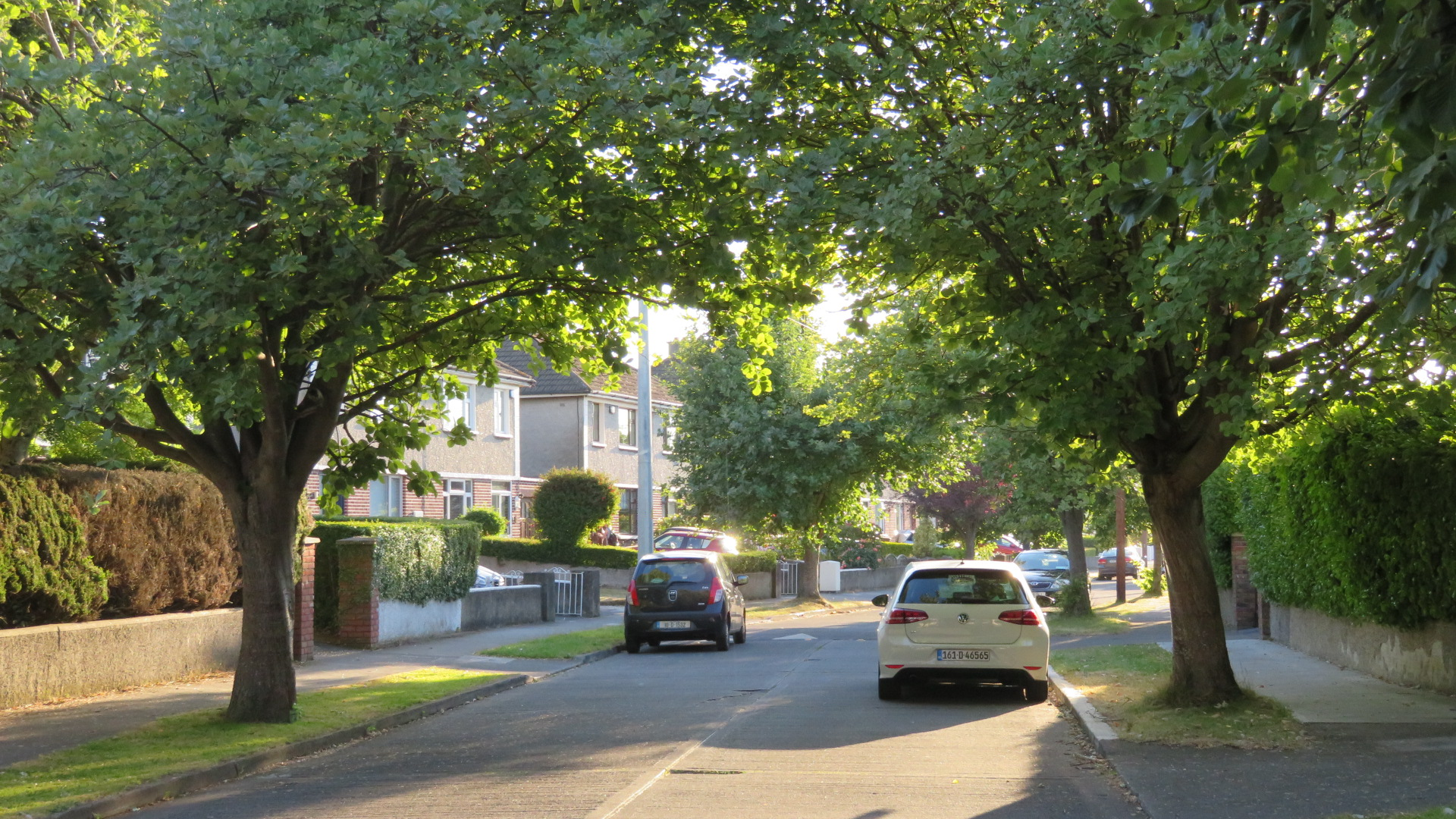
- Silverwood Road, located just outside Ballyroan

- Location in Dublin
- Coordinates: 53°17′21″N 6°18′07″W
- Country: Ireland
- Province: Leinster
- County: County Dublin

Government
  - Dáil Éireann: Dublin South-West
  - EU Parliament: Dublin
- Time zone: UTC+0 (WET)
  - Summer (DST): UTC-1 (IST (WEST))
- Eircode routing key: D16

Ballyroan (Irish: Baile Uí Ruáin, meaning 'O'Rowan's town') is a suburban area of Dublin, Ireland. It is within the suburb of Rathfarnham and lies at the foot of the Dublin Mountains, alongside Ballyboden, Butterfield, Knocklyon, Old Orchard, and Scholarstown.

The townland of Ballyroan crosses civil parish and barony boundaries with roughly 114 acres of the historical townland in the civil parish of Tallaght in the barony of Uppercross, and nearly 10 acres in the civil parish of Rathfarnham in the barony of Rathdown. The modern suburb of Ballyroan has extended somewhat beyond the traditional townland boundaries. The area is administered by South Dublin County Council.

== Amenities ==
The centre of Ballyroan contains the Ballyroan Community & Youth Centre, the Rosemount Shopping Centre, the parish church which opened in December 1967 and which possesses two murals inside by the artist, Seán Keating, and the Ballyroan public library which opened in 1986. The library closed in September 2011 and was demolished. A new library twice the size of the original was built at the same site at a cost of €2.6 million and opened on 18 February 2013.

There are two secondary schools, Sancta Maria College and Coláiste Éanna, and a local Scout group.

== Transport ==
Ballyroan is served by the 15B bus route.

== Gallery ==
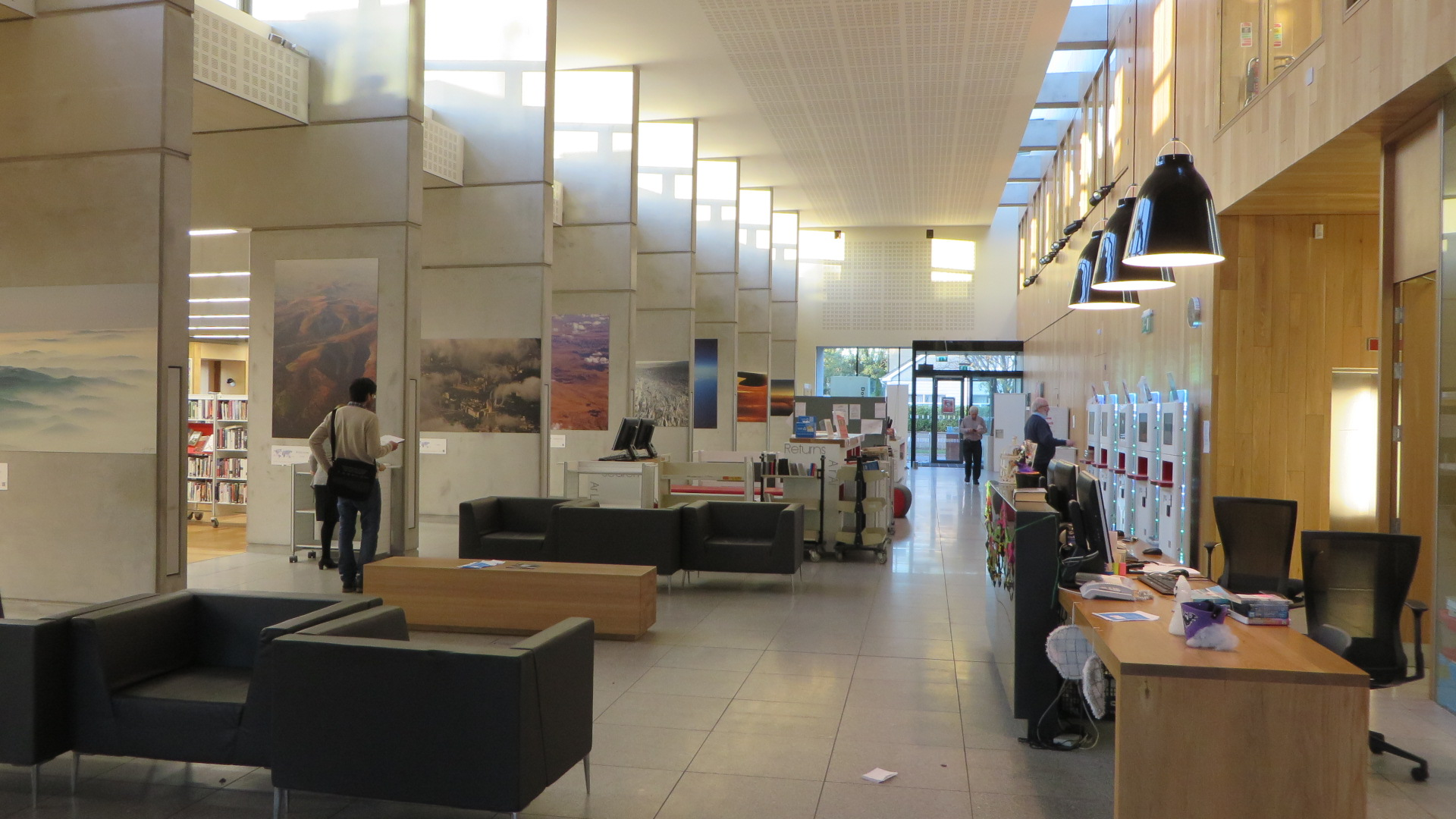
Public library on Orchardstown Villas

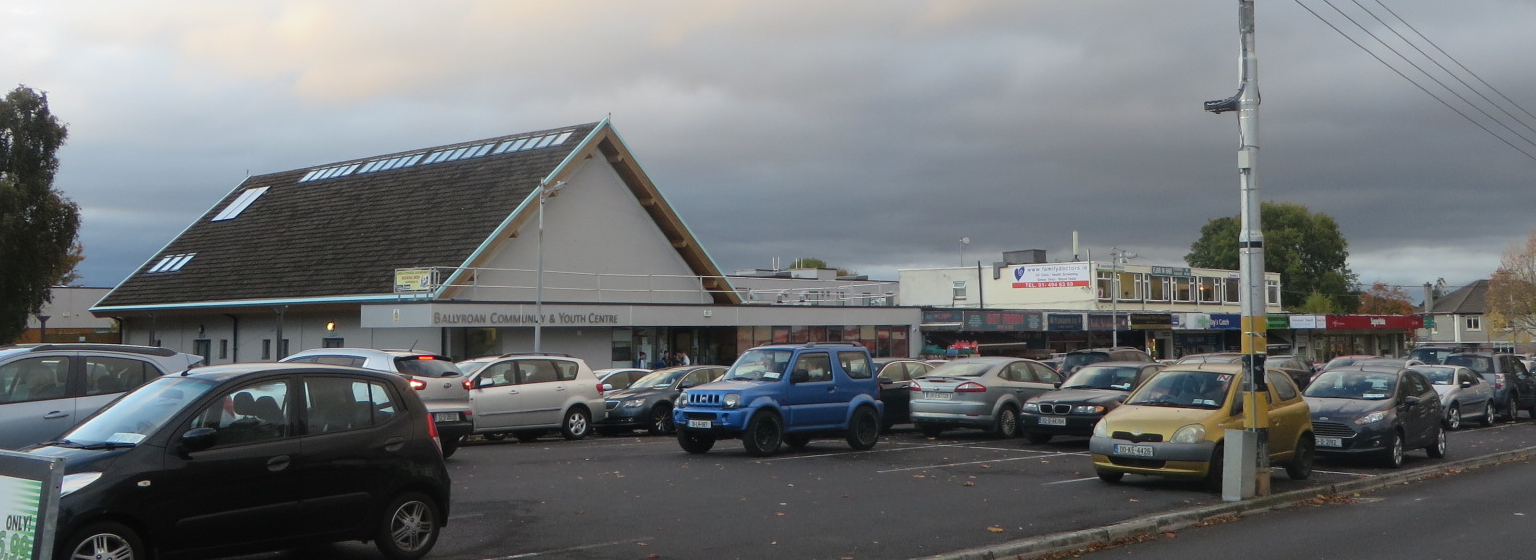
Ballyroan Community & Youth Centre (left) and Rosemount Shopping Centre (right)

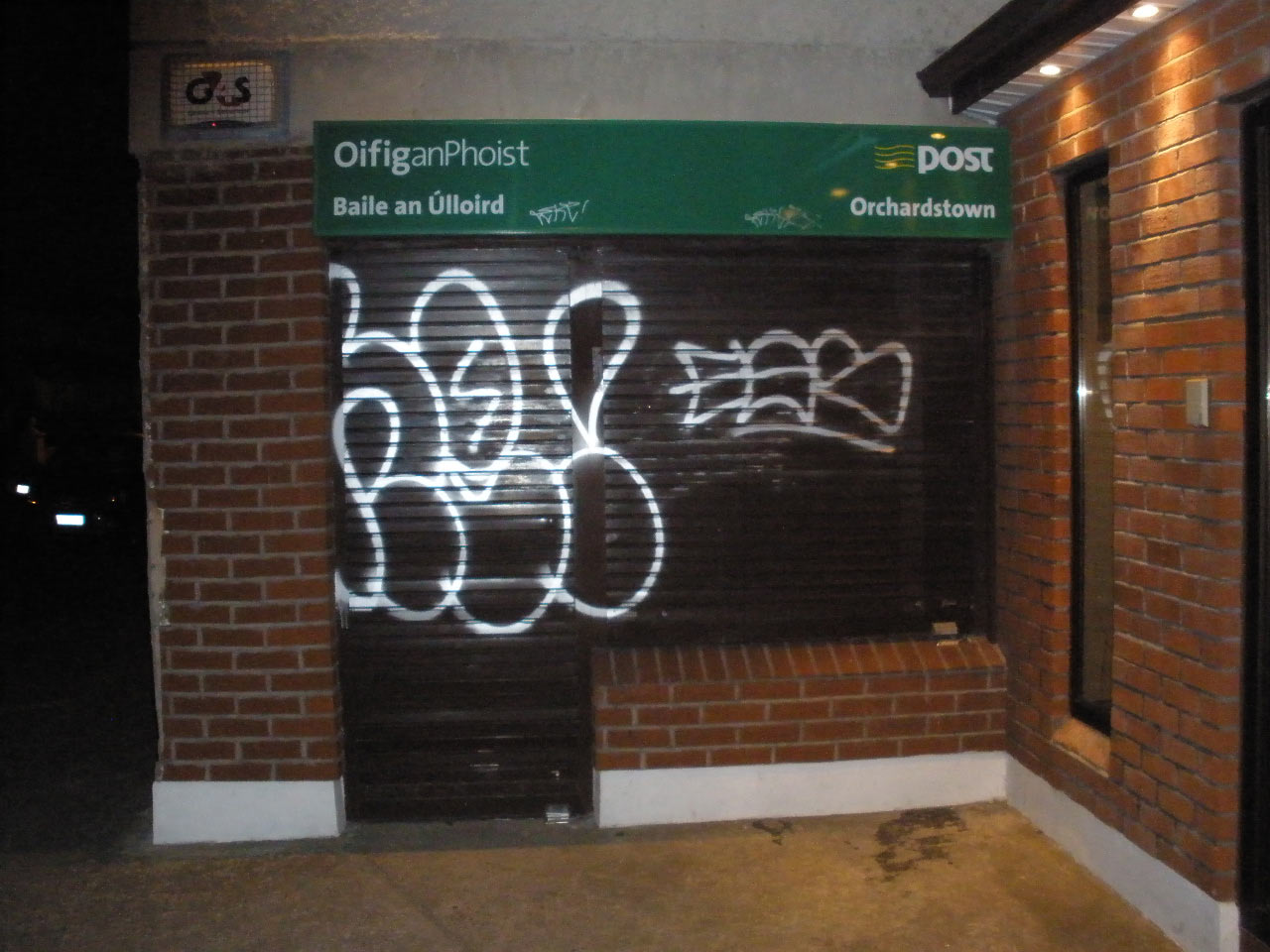
Former post office on Marian Road
