= South Dublin =

County in Ireland

Coordinates: 53°18′28″N 6°24′47″W

South Dublin Baile Átha Cliath Theas (Irish)
- County
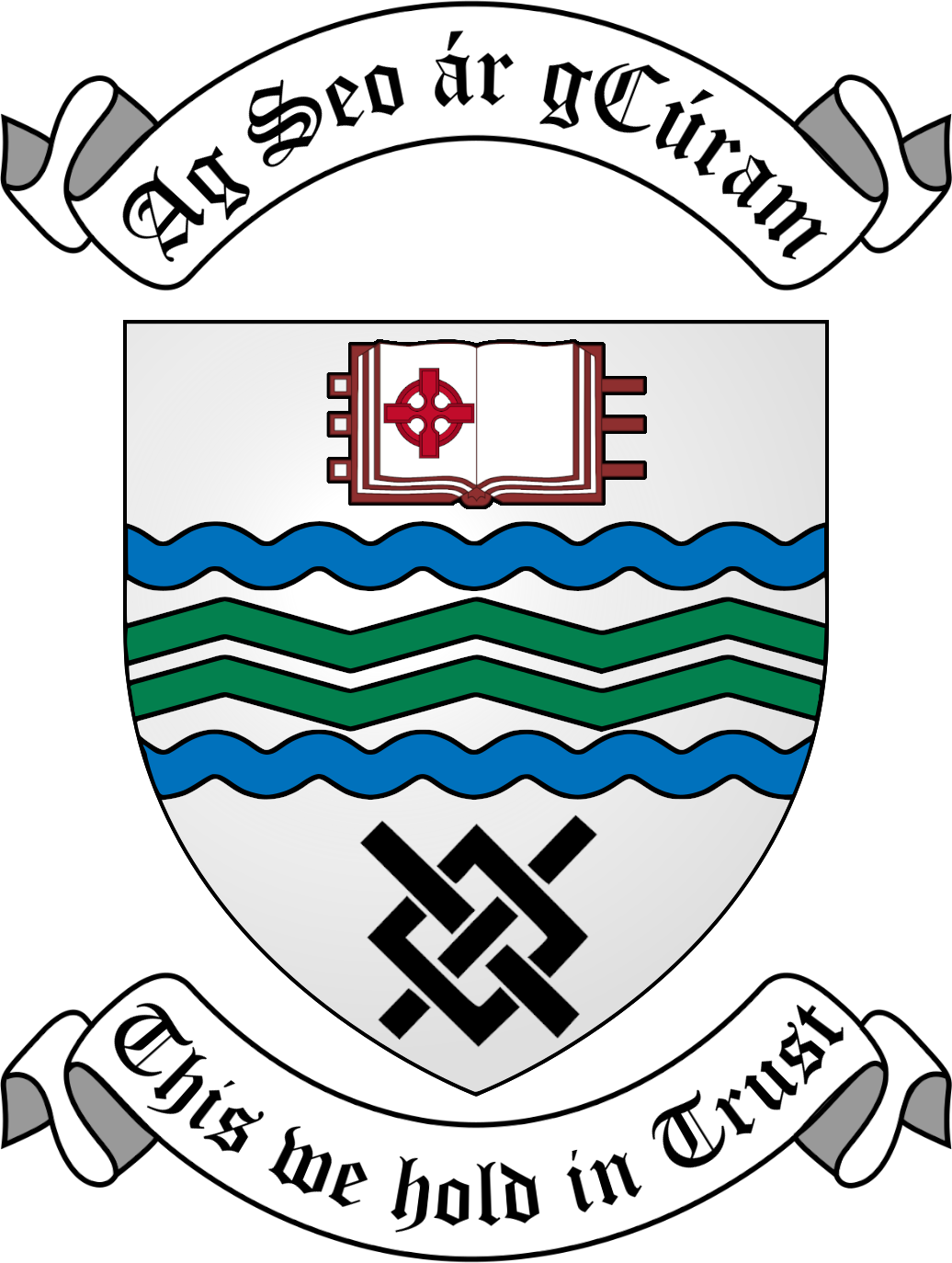
- Coat of arms
- Mottoes: This We Hold in Trust; Irish: Ag Seo Ár gCúram
- Interactive map of South Dublin
- Country: Ireland
- Province: Leinster
- Region: Eastern and Midland
- Established: 1994
- County town: Tallaght

Government
  - Local authority: South Dublin County Council
  - Dáil constituencies: Dublin Mid-West; Dublin South-Central; Dublin South-West
  - EU Parliament: Dublin

Area
  - Total: 222.74 km^{2} (86.00 sq mi)
- Highest elevation (Kippure): 757 m (2,484 ft)

Population (2022)
  - Total: 301,075
  - Density: 1,351.7/km^{2} (3,500.9/sq mi)
- Time zone: UTC±0 (WET)
  - Summer (DST): UTC+1 (IST)
- Vehicle index mark code: D
- Website: Official website

South Dublin (Irish: Baile Átha Cliath Theas) is a county in Ireland, within the province of Leinster and the Eastern and Midland Region. It is one of three successor counties to County Dublin, which was disestablished for administrative purposes in 1994. South Dublin County Council is the local authority for the county. The county contains both dense suburbs of Dublin and stretches of unpopulated mountains. In 2022 it had a population of 301,075, making it the fourth most populous county in the state.

== Geography and population ==
South Dublin has an area of 222.74 square kilometres (86 sq mi), making it the second-largest of the four local government areas in Dublin. It is bounded by Dublin City (15 km, 9.3 mi to the northeast), the River Liffey (separating it from Fingal to the north), Dún Laoghaire–Rathdown (to the east), County Kildare (to the west) and its hills adjoin the mountains of County Wicklow to the south.

The county town is Tallaght. Other important centres of population are Lucan and Clondalkin. Much of the county is heavily urbanised but small rural settlements exist in the southern and western parts. South Dublin's population increased from 278,767 in 2016 to 301,075 in 2022, according to the latest census.

=== Towns and villages ===
Several urban areas in South Dublin County are also traditionally suburbs of Dublin city. For the purposes of planning and management, the County Council designates the status of towns, villages and suburbs in three tiers – 'town', 'district centre' and 'local centre'. In the 2022 development plan, the towns and district centres are listed as:

- Tallaght, the county seat and the location of The Square Shopping Centre which was opened in October 1990
- Clondalkin ("to be facilitated and developed as a Town Centre ... including northward development")
- Lucan (with notes on the Liffey Valley Centre, and the developing Adamstown area – a future "district centre" – and a stated aim to avoid Lucan merging with Leixlip)
- and with a proposal to develop a Town Centre around the Liffey Valley Centre at Quarryvale

while the more local centres are noted in three groups:

- 'city suburbs' including at least Rathfarnham, Ballyroan, Palmerstown, Terenure, Templeogue, Knocklyon, Firhouse, Ballycullen and Greenhills
- 'villages' such as Rathcoole, Newcastle(-Lyons), and Saggart
- 'new neighbourhoods', some within bigger, older areas – including such as Kilnamanagh, Ballyowen, Finnstown, and, in development, Adamstown (mentioned in the county plan as an extension of Lucan).

=== Residential areas ===
- Adamstown
- Ballyboden
- Ballycullen
- Ballyroan
- Belgard
- Citywest
- Clondalkin
- Edmondstown
- Firhouse
- Greenhills
- Jobstown
- Kingswood
- Kilnamanagh
- Knocklyon
- Lucan
- Newcastle
- Palmerstown
- Rathcoole
- Rathfarnham
- Rockbrook
- Ronanstown
- Saggart
- Tallaght
- Templeogue
- Walkinstown, southernmost part

== Terminology ==
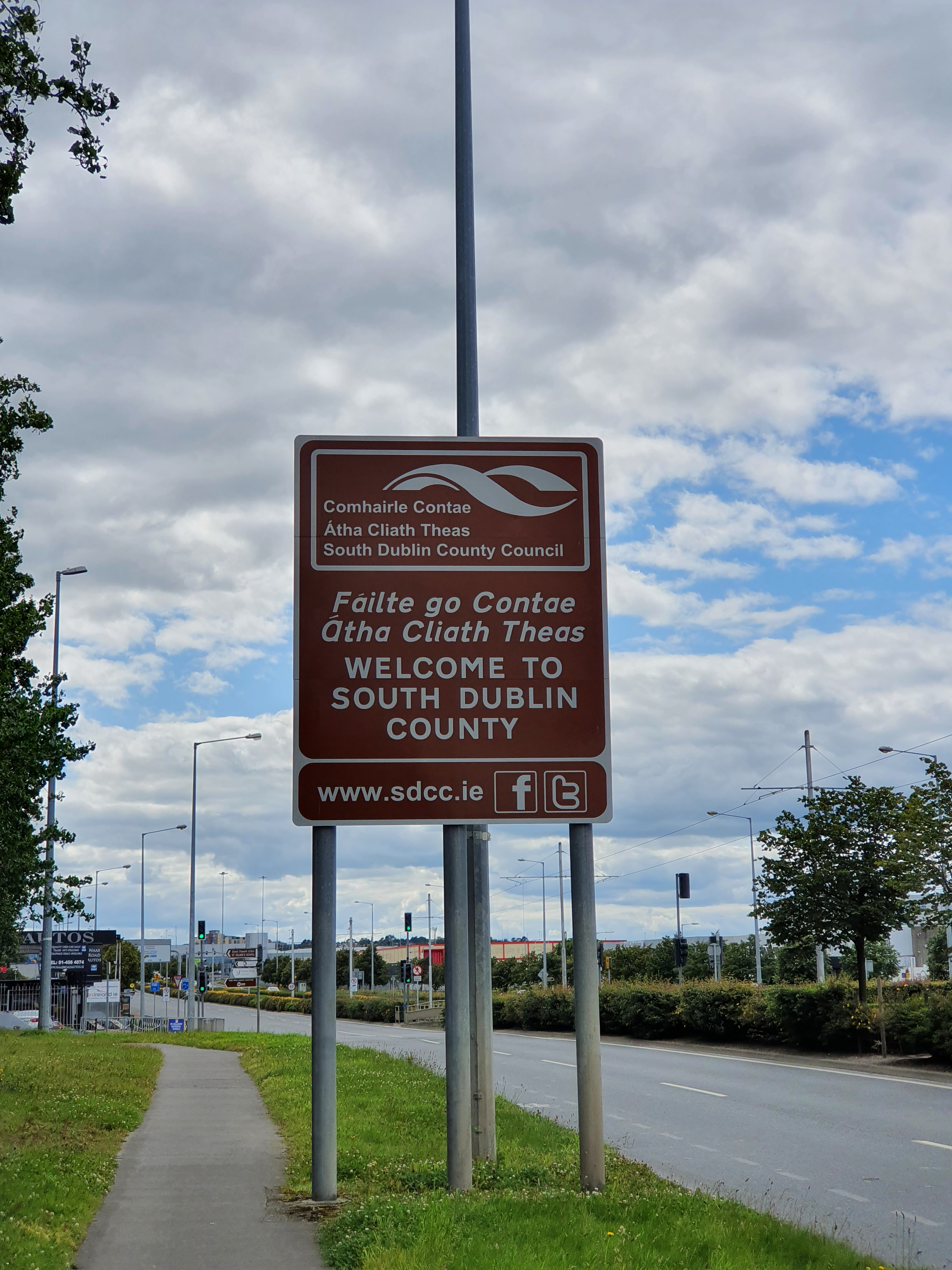
Signposted boundary between Dublin City and South Dublin County on the Naas Road in Inchicore

In Ireland, the usage of the word county nearly always comes before rather than after the county name; thus "County Clare" in Ireland as opposed to "Clare County" in Michigan, USA. In the case of those counties created after 1994, they often drop the word county entirely, or use it after the name; thus for example internet search engines show many more uses (on Irish sites) of "South Dublin" than of either "County South Dublin" or "South Dublin County". The 2003 placenames order lists South Dublin without any modification.

== History ==
In 1985, County Dublin was divided into three electoral counties: Dublin–Fingal, Dublin–Belgard, and Dún Laoghaire–Rathdown. At the 1991 local election, the area of Dublin–Belgard was renamed as South Dublin. The name Belgard did have a historical association with the area, being the designation of one of the border fortresses of the Pale that existed in that area. It was altered due to a view that the name Belgard might create associations with areas of modern development in Tallaght that now also uses that name.

On 1 January 1994, under the provisions of the Local Government (Dublin) Act 1993, County Dublin ceased to exist, and was succeeded by the counties of Fingal, Dún Laoghaire–Rathdown and South Dublin in the areas of the electoral counties. Under the act, South Dublin County Council (together with Dún Laoghaire–Rathdown County Council and Fingal County Council) became one of the three "successor" councils to Dublin County Council. The boundaries of South Dublin were finalised in 1993, to accommodate the M50 motorway.

Various organs of state use alternative subdivisions of Dublin for administrative reasons, for example, the Dublin postal codes.

== Local government and politics ==
The island of Ireland, showing location of South Dublin.

South Dublin County Council is the local authority for the county. It was established on 1 January 1994 with the establishment of the county. It is one of local authorities in County Dublin. The county is divided into seven local electoral areas: Clondalkin (7 councillors), Firhouse–Bohernabreena (5 councillors), Lucan (5 councillors), Rathfarnham–Templeogue (7 councillors), Tallaght Central (6 councillors), and Tallaght South (5 councillors).

The Dáil constituencies of Dublin Mid-West (4 seats) and Dublin South-West (5 seats) are wholly within South Dublin, and the constituency of Dublin South-Central is partially within South Dublin.

In 2015, South Dublin became part of the Eastern and Midland Region. South Dublin County Council sends three members to the Eastern and Midland Regional Assembly.

== Demographics ==
Main immigrant groups, 2016
Nationality	Population
United Kingdom	9,159
Poland	7,988
Romania	3,235
Lithuania	2,726
Nigeria	2,644
India	2,620
Pakistan	1,499
Philippines	1,434
China	999
Latvia	971

== Symbols ==
The heraldic crest for South Dublin has the inscription "This We Hold in Trust" in both English and Irish, while incorporating elements relating to the history, geography and present day infrastructure of the area.

== Sport ==
The League of Ireland club Shamrock Rovers plays at Tallaght Stadium. The stadium hosted the 2009 FAI Cup final and the Setanta Sports Cup final in 2010 & 2011.

The National Basketball Arena in Tallaght is the home venue for both the Ireland national basketball team and Ireland women's national basketball team. The arena also hosts various National Cup & League matches.

== Flora and fauna ==
In 2024, South Dublin County Council managed 195 hectares of meadows across the entirety of South Dublin including 175 hectares of long-flowering meadows and 20 hectares of short-flowering meadows.

== Twinning ==
South Dublin is twinned with the London Borough of Brent, United Kingdom.
