= Ballyboden =

Locality in Dublin, Ireland

Ballyboden Baile Buadáin (Irish)
- Electoral division
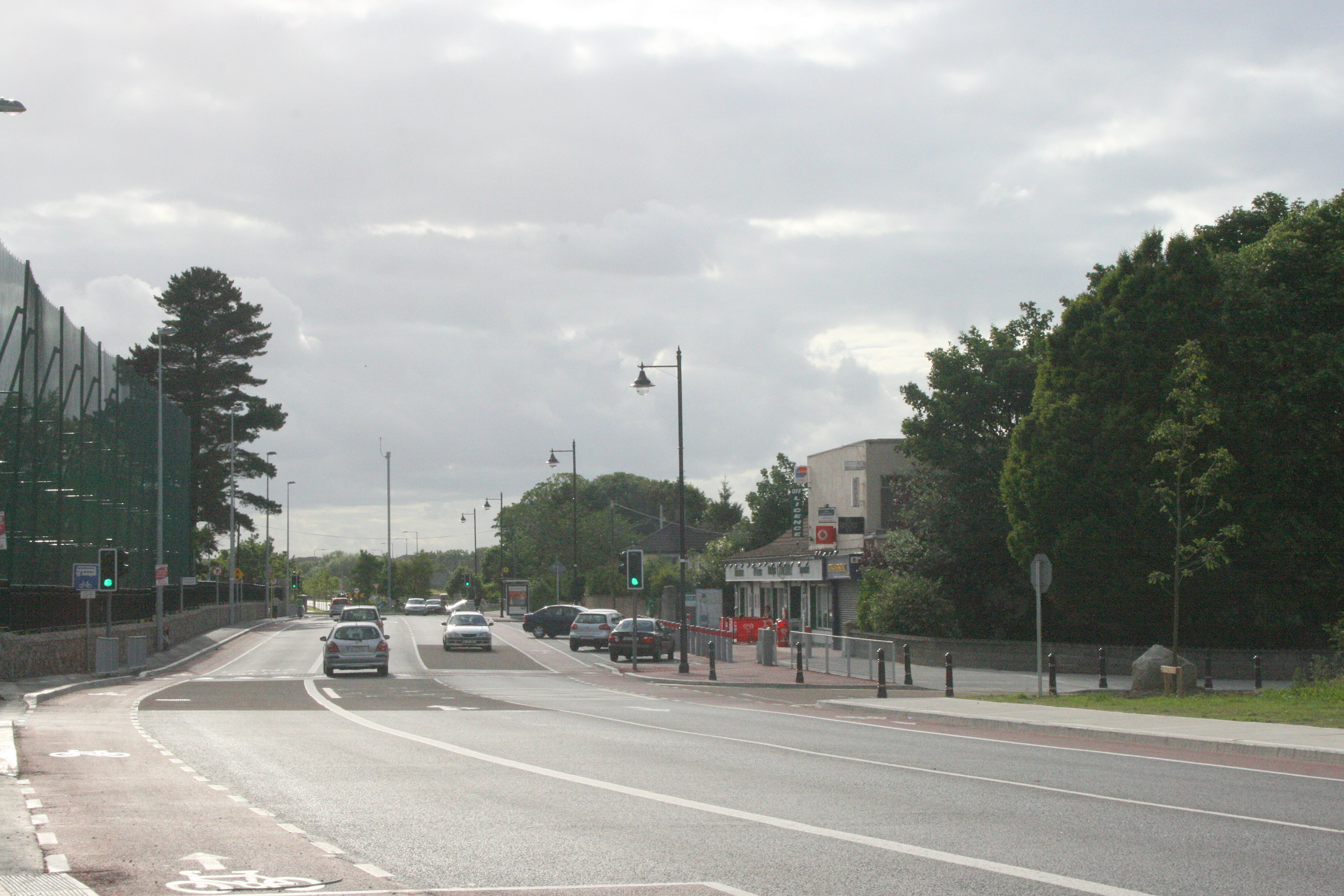
- Taylor's Lane, Ballyboden

- Location in Ireland
- Coordinates: 53°16′55″N 6°17′24″W
- Country: Ireland
- Province: Leinster
- County: County Dublin

Government
  - Dáil constituency: Dublin South-West
  - EP constituency: Dublin

Population (2006)
  - Urban: 5,193
- Time zone: UTC+0 (WET)
  - Summer (DST): UTC-1 (IST (WEST))
- Eircode routing key: D16
- Irish Grid Reference: O144289

Ballyboden (Irish: Baile Buadáin) is a townland and electoral division in Dublin, Ireland. It is within the suburb of Rathfarnham, at the foot of the Dublin Mountains between Whitechurch, Ballyroan and Knocklyon. Ballyboden ED is in the local government area of South Dublin County Council, while Ballyboden townland is the civil parish of Whitechurch in the historical barony of Rathdown.

== Population ==
According to the 2006 census, the electoral division of Ballyboden had a population of about five thousand. This figure was 5,246 in the 2022 census.

== Religion ==
The Catholic parish of Ballyboden was established in 1973. It is managed by the Order of Saint Augustine. Within the Archdiocese of Dublin, Rathfarnham parish is the parent of several local parishes. To accommodate the increasing need for ministry to the residential development of the Rathfarnham area over the last century, Terenure was developed in 1894, Churchtown (1965), Ballyroan (1968), Tallaght (1972), Ballyboden (1973) and Knocklyon (1974).

There had been an Augustinian house of studies in Ballyboden since 1955. It was the home of students of the Augustinian Order following the two-year course in philosophy. When the new church in Ballyroan was opened in 1966, the Augustinians took an active part. The order had acquired 'Orlagh' as a novitiate in 1872. When University College Dublin moved from Earlsfort Terrace in Dublin 2 to the campus at Belfield in south County Dublin in the 1960s and 1970s, the order acquired 'St. Catherines' in Ballyboden, previously a private residence.

The Church of Ireland parish is centred on the pre-Reformation parish at Whitechurch.

== Amenities ==
Ballyboden is home to the Ballyboden Water Treatment Plant, located on Stocking Lane. The facility is operated by Dublin City Council and Uisce Éireann. The plant itself is within the county of South Dublin.

The Pearse Museum is 700 metres east of Ballyboden centre.

== Sport ==
Ballyboden is home to two Gaelic Athletic Association clubs. Ballyboden Wanderers, first founded in 1910, are based on Mount Venus Road, while Ballyboden St. Enda's has its clubhouse and main pitch on Firhouse Road.

Republic of Ireland football player Damien Duff is from the locality as was League of Ireland Premier Division player and Brownlow Medallist Jim Stynes.

== Transport ==
Ballyboden is served by Dublin Bus routes 15B, 15D and 15, along with local connecting services.

== See also ==
- List of towns and villages in Ireland
- Mount Venus
