= Dublin Mountains Way =

Hiking trail in the Dublin Mountains in Ireland

Dublin Mountains Way (Slí Shléibhte Bhaile Átha Cliath)
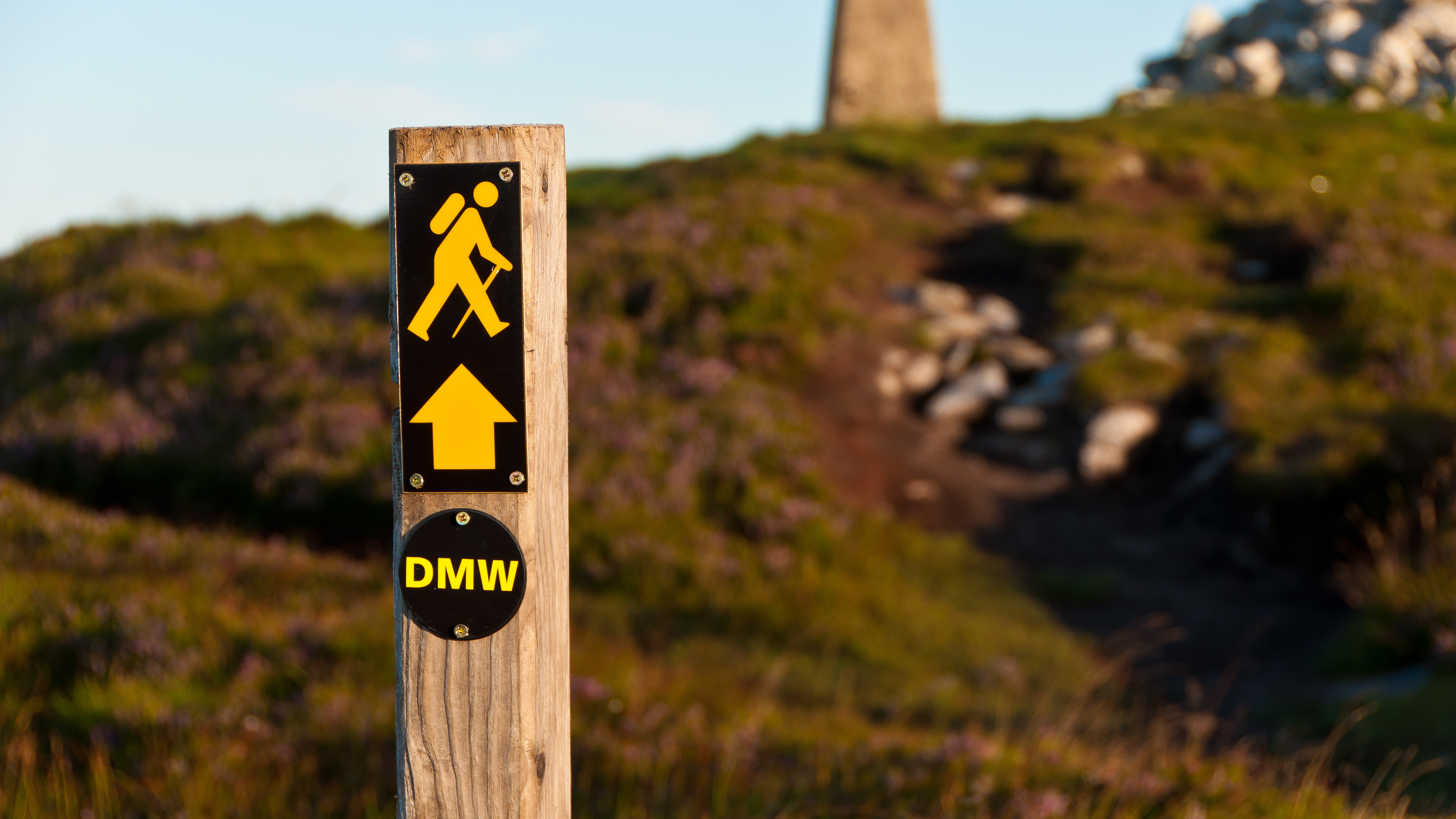
- Waymarker on the Dublin Mountains Way at Fairy Castle with yellow man symbol and "DMW" sign
- Length: 42 km (26 mi)
- Location: South Dublin; Dún Laoghaire–Rathdown, Ireland
- Designation: National Waymarked Way
- Trailheads: Shankill, Dún Laoghaire–Rathdown; Tallaght, South Dublin
- Use: Hiking
- Elevation change: 1,140 m (3,740 ft)
- Highest point: Fairy Castle, 536 m (1,759 ft)
- Lowest point: Shankill, 20 m (66 ft)
- Difficulty: Strenuous
- Season: Any
- Sights: Dublin Mountains; Carrickgollogan; The Scalp; Glencullen; Three Rock; Two Rock; Tibradden Mountain; Featherbed Forest; Bohernabreena waterworks
- Hazards: Some sections on busy roads
- Surface: Road and forest and mountain tracks and trails
- Website: dublinmountains.ie

The Dublin Mountains Way (Irish: Slí Shléibhte Bhaile Átha Cliath) is a waymarked long-distance trail in the Dublin Mountains, Counties South Dublin and Dún Laoghaire–Rathdown, Ireland. The route is approximately 42 kilometres (26 miles) long and runs from Shankill in the east to Tallaght in the west. It has been developed by the Dublin Mountains Partnership, an umbrella group of relevant state agencies and recreational users working to improve recreational facilities in the Dublin Mountains.

Work on the trail began in 2008 and the first section officially opened in June 2009. The task of upgrading and building paths and waymarking the route has been carried out to a large extent by volunteers working under the direction of the Dublin Mountains Partnership. It was opened in October 2010.

Travelling from east to west, the route of the Dublin Mountains Way starts on the Main Street of Shankill and passes through Rathmichael, Carrickgollogan, Barnaslingan, Glencullen, Ballyedmonduff, Three Rock, Two Rock, Tibradden Mountain, Cruagh Wood, Featherbed Forest, Glenasmole and Kiltipper before ending at Seán Walsh Memorial Park in Tallaght. The Way visits several sites of historical interest including the prehistoric monuments at Ballyedmonduff and on Two Rock and Tibradden Mountains. It also visits several places of scientific interest such as The Scalp, an important example of a glacial lake overflow, and the Glenasmole Valley, a Special Area of Conservation. The route passes through a variety of terrain from urban parks to forest to open mountainside and is on a mixture of roads and forest and mountain tracks and trails.

== History ==
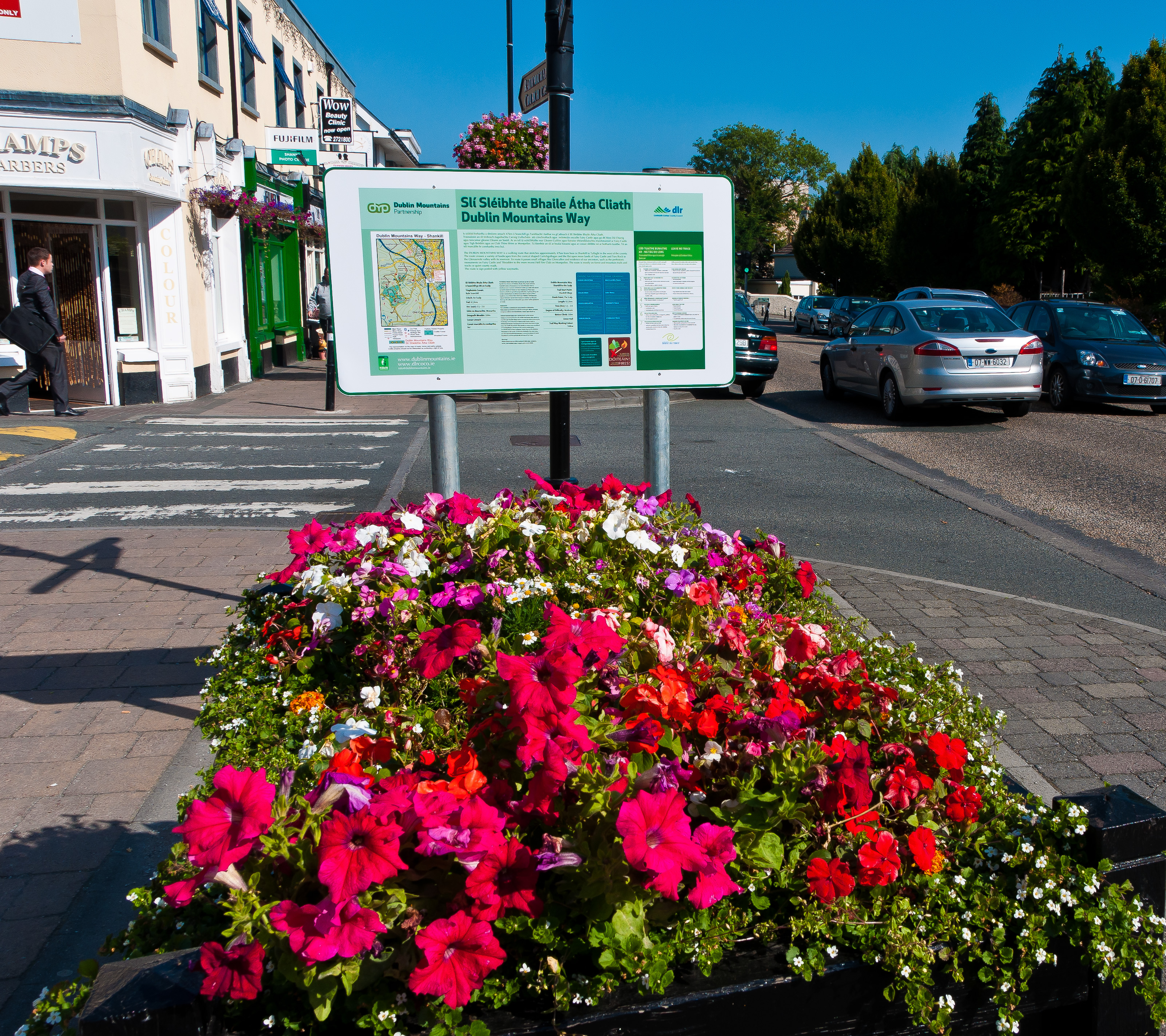
Shankill

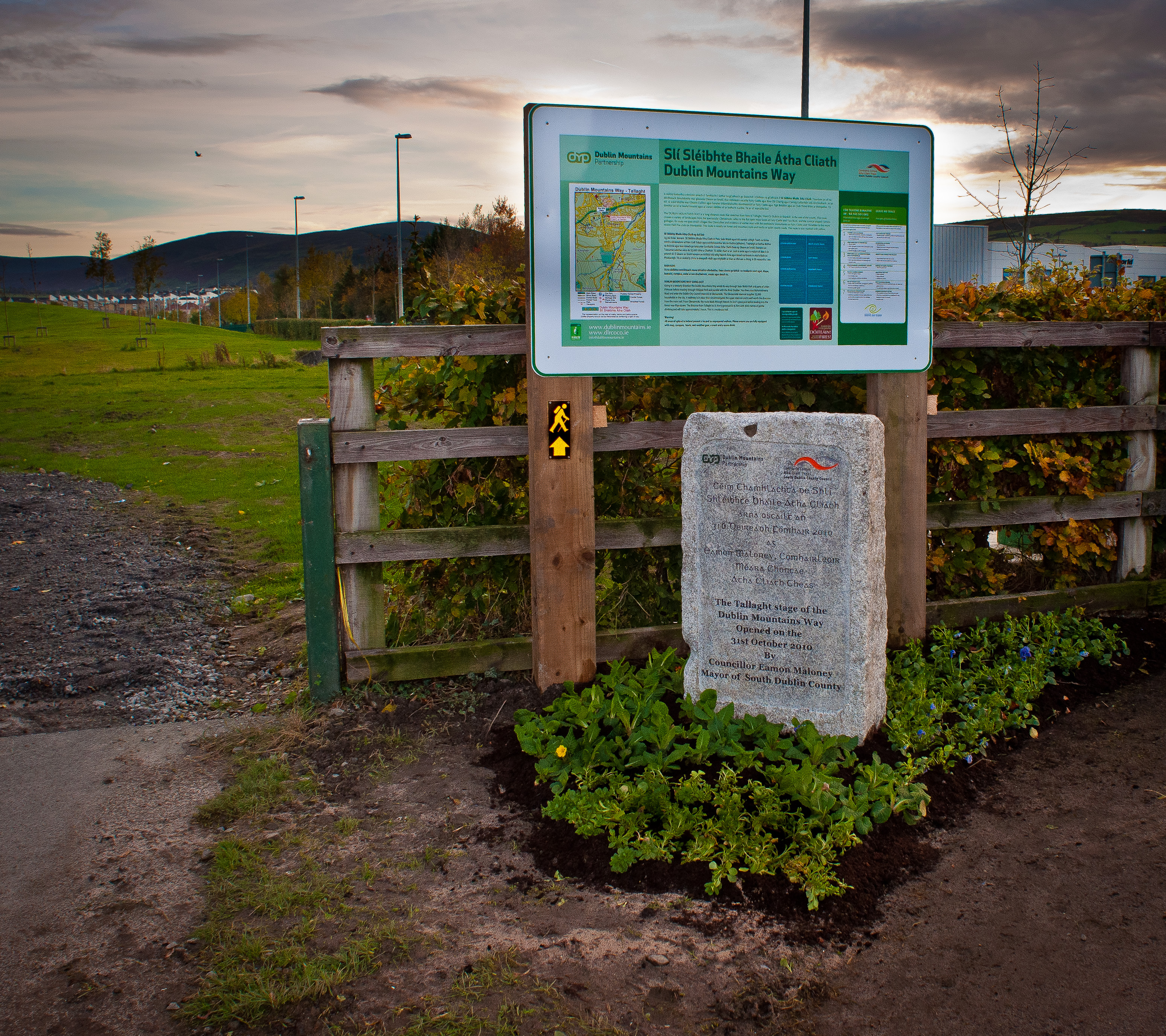
Tallaght

Trailheads of the Dublin Mountains Way

The Dublin Mountains Way has been developed by the Dublin Mountains Partnership (DMP), which was established in May 2008 with the aim of improving the recreational experience for users of the Dublin Mountains. Its members include representatives from Coillte, the State-owned forestry company; South Dublin County Council; Dún Laoghaire–Rathdown County Council; the National Parks and Wildlife Service and the Dublin Mountains Initiative, an umbrella group of recreational users of the mountains. The trail has been an objective of the local authorities since the 1980s; an attempt to develop the Way in 1988 was thwarted when the Department of Energy vetoed the routing of the trail through state-owned forests due to the risk of public liability claims, even though £10,000 had been spent on equipment, including waymarks. With the formation of the DMP in 2008, the trail began to be realised. The DMP was set up as a result of pressure from the Dublin Mountains Initiative arising from clear felling of forests in the area. The vision document published in 2006 by the Dublin Mountains Initiative included a proposal for a "Dublin Way", similar to what has now been developed.

Work commenced on the Dublin Mountains Way in September 2008 with the upgrade of the trail at Tibradden Mountain. A sleepered bog bridge was constructed at the summit to protect the surrounding heathland and a stone staircase and water management features were added to other parts of the trail. The work was carried out with support from Comhairle na Tuaithe at a cost of €100,000. The first section of the Way – from Tibradden to Cruagh Wood – was officially opened on 19 June 2009 by Éamon Ó Cuív, TD, Minister for Community, Rural and Gaeltacht Affairs. Other sections have been completed with assistance from over 300 volunteer workers. The section linking Cruagh Wood and Massy's Estate was built by volunteers from the trail conservation group Mountain Meitheal with funding from the Irish Ramblers Club. Mountain Meitheal's work on this section of trail was awarded second prize in the European Ramblers' Association 2011 Eco Awards, in recognition of achievements in environmental protection and sustainable outdoor recreation. Volunteers from Google have upgraded trails and waymarked the route at Barnaslingan and Carrickgollogan. The full route was officially opened on 31 October 2010 by the Dublin Mountains Partnership at a ceremony in Ticknock forest. In November 2011, the Dublin Mountains Way won a Chambers Ireland Excellence in Local Government Award in the Joint Local Authority Initiative section.

A number of alterations were made to the route in 2012. The Way originally passed through St Ann's graveyard in Glenasmole to reach the Bohernabreena Waterworks but now follows the road to Castlekelly Bridge, entering the Waterworks at its southern end. Following an agreement with a local landowner, some 2 kilometres (1.2 miles) of trail has been taken off-road by facilitating access to Three Rock Mountain via private forestry at Ballyedmonduff.

A further major change occurred in 2013: originally the route included an optional looped route around Massy's Estate and the Hell Fire Club on Montpelier Hill; this part of the route was removed to comply with the international classification rules for walking trails, which require trails to be continuous and without detours or loops.

== Route ==
=== Shankill and Rathmichael ===
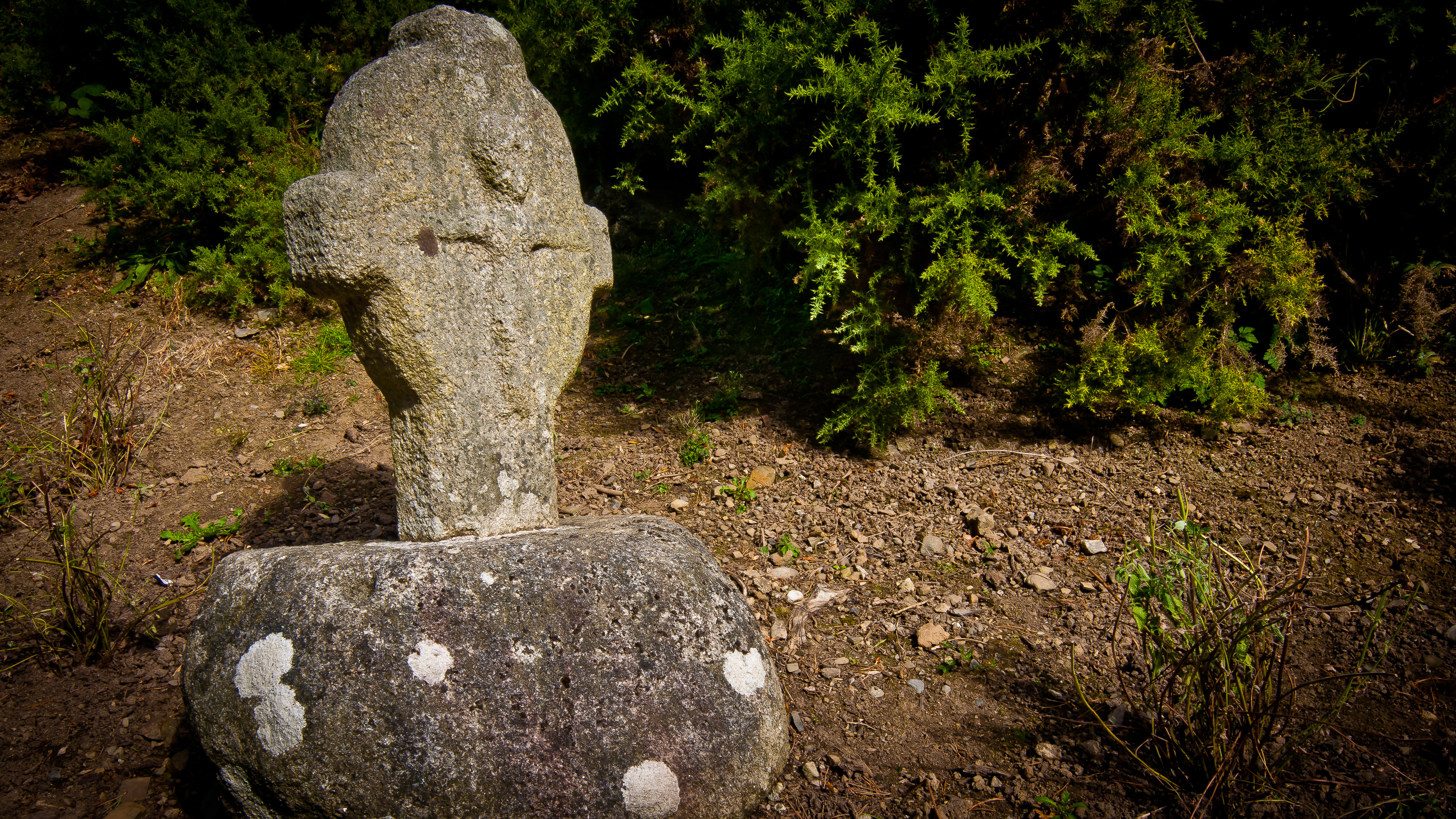
The twelfth century Fassaroe Cross at the entrance to Rathmichael Wood

Heading from east to west, the Dublin Mountains Way starts in the village of Shankill at Brady's pub. The trailhead is marked by a mapboard erected by the Dublin Mountains Partnership. The Way is marked with the standard yellow "walking man" symbol used by long-distance trails in Ireland. Sections where the Dublin Mountains Way crosses other trails are also signed "DMW". The trail follows a series of lanes behind the pub, through the Tillystown area of Shankill, crossing the M11 motorway via a pedestrian bridge, following the line of an old mass path to Rathmichael. It then follows Lordello Road and emerges onto Ferndale Road where it soon turns onto a lane leading into Rathmichael Wood. Along this lane is a twelfth-century cross set in a granite boulder base. This is one of a series of crosses – known as the Fassaroe Crosses – found in the locality, all of which are believed to have been the work of the same stonemason. The base is in its original location but the cross itself was found in the remains of the church in neighbouring Kiltuck and reunited with its base in 1910. The cross is unusual in that there is a crucifixion scene on both faces. Competing theories for the purpose of the cross are that it marked a route between the churches at Rathmichael and Kiltuck or that it marked the site of another church, now long gone. Local folklore tells a tale of a series of misfortunes that once befell a group of men sent to take the cross at the behest of a local collector of antiquities. The trail passes through Rathmichael Wood and emerges onto Puck's Castle Lane.

=== Carrickgollogan and Barnaslingan ===
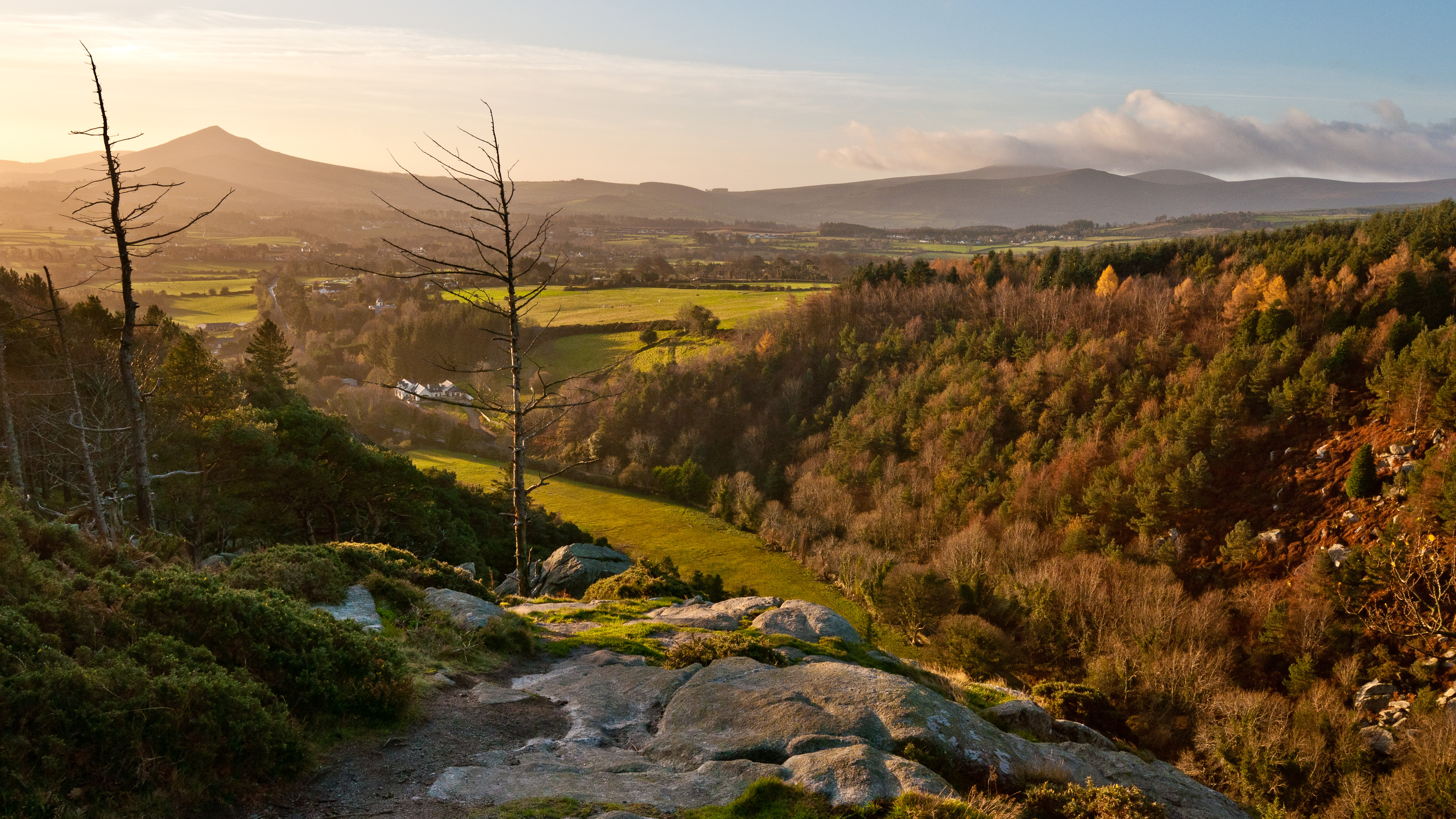
The Scalp as seen from the summit of Barnaslingan

From Puck's Castle Lane, the trail enters Carrickgollogan Wood. These woods consist of 85 hectares (210 acres) of mixed woodland including Lodgepole pine, Noble fir, Japanese larch, Lawson cypress, Scots pine, birch and beech. The ruin of the flue chimney of the former Ballycorus Leadmines, with its distinctive external spiral staircase becomes visible as the trail climbs the hillside. The route passes close to but does not ascend the summit of Carrickgollogan Hill (276 m or 906 ft), which can be reached by a short detour along the waymarked Lead Mines Way. The trail emerges from Carrickgollogan onto Murphy's Lane and thence to Barnaslingan Lane where it enters Barnaslingan Wood.

The trail passes through dense pine woods as it ascends the summit of Barnaslingan Hill (238 metres (781 feet)). The summit looks over The Scalp, a narrow glacial valley created during the last ice age. This slender channel was gouged out by escaping meltwater draining from a glacial lake. These glacial origins are evident from the granite outcrops and boulders that litter the hillside. The Scalp is an important example of a glacial lake outflow and is listed as an Area of Scientific Interest. The trail descends through the woods and emerges onto the R117 (Enniskerry) Road.

=== Kilternan and Glencullen ===
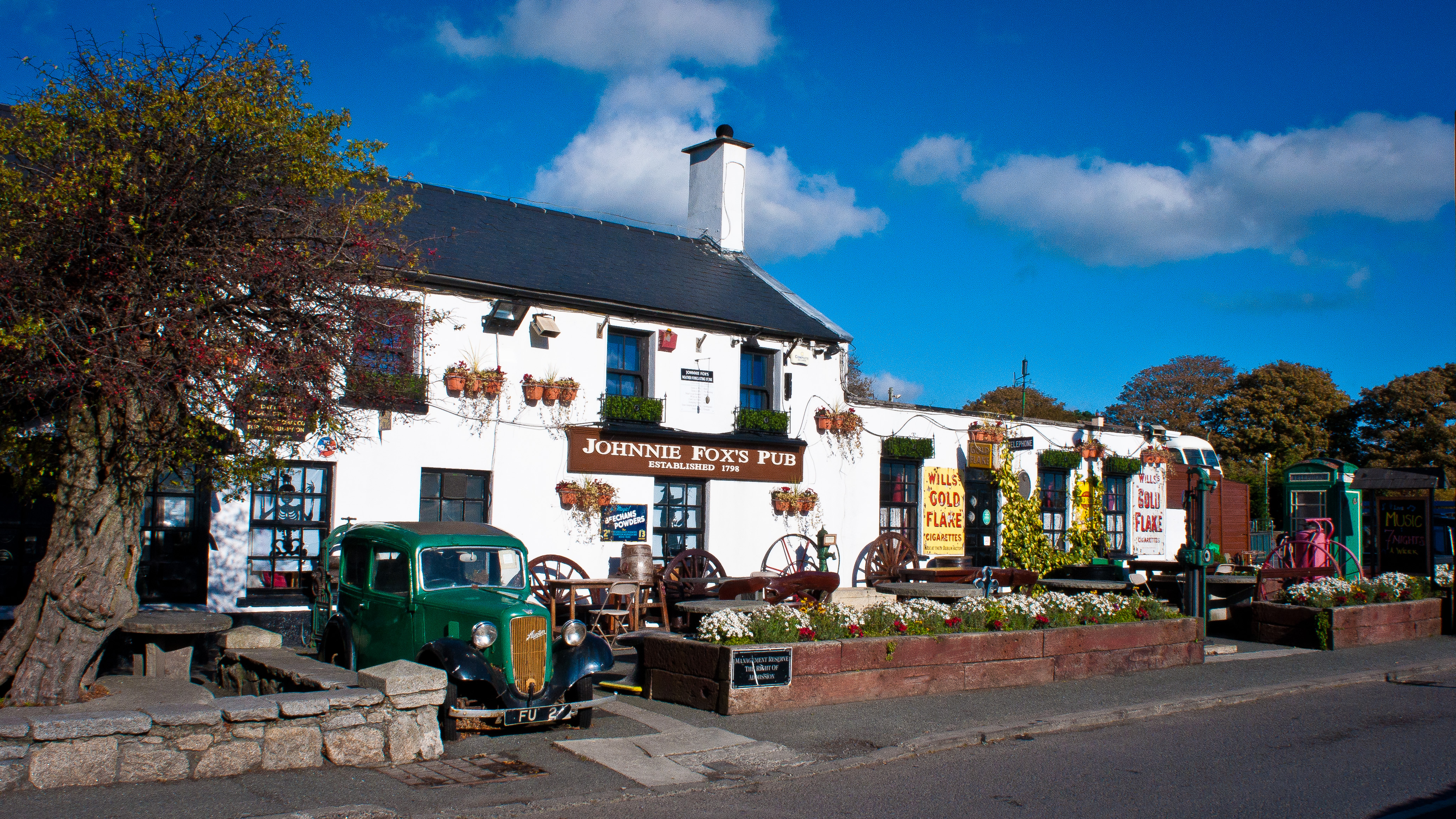
Johnnie Fox's Pub, Glencullen

The trail follows the R117 road to the village of Kilternan. Along the way, it passes the partially completed Kilternan Golf and Country Club, built around a nineteenth-century house called Springfield which was once the home of the poet and mathematician George Darley. Reaching Kilternan village, the route turns onto the R116 road at the Church of Our Lady of the Wayside, a distinctive wooden structure built in 1929.

From Kilternan, the Way follows the R116 road to Glencullen, built on the crossroads where the R116 meets the Ballyedmonduff Road. The Glencullen area has long been a centre for granite quarrying and stonecutting and stone from here has been used in many notable Dublin buildings such as the GPO and the Industry and Commerce Building on Kildare Street. Passing through the village, the route takes in the ruins of the old church, built in 1824; the Carnegie library, built in 1907; and the new church, built in 1909, all of which were built with support from the O'Connell-Fitzsimon family who owned the lands around Glencullen for many years. The focal point of the village is Johnnie Fox's pub which was established in 1798.

=== Three Rock and Two Rock Mountains ===
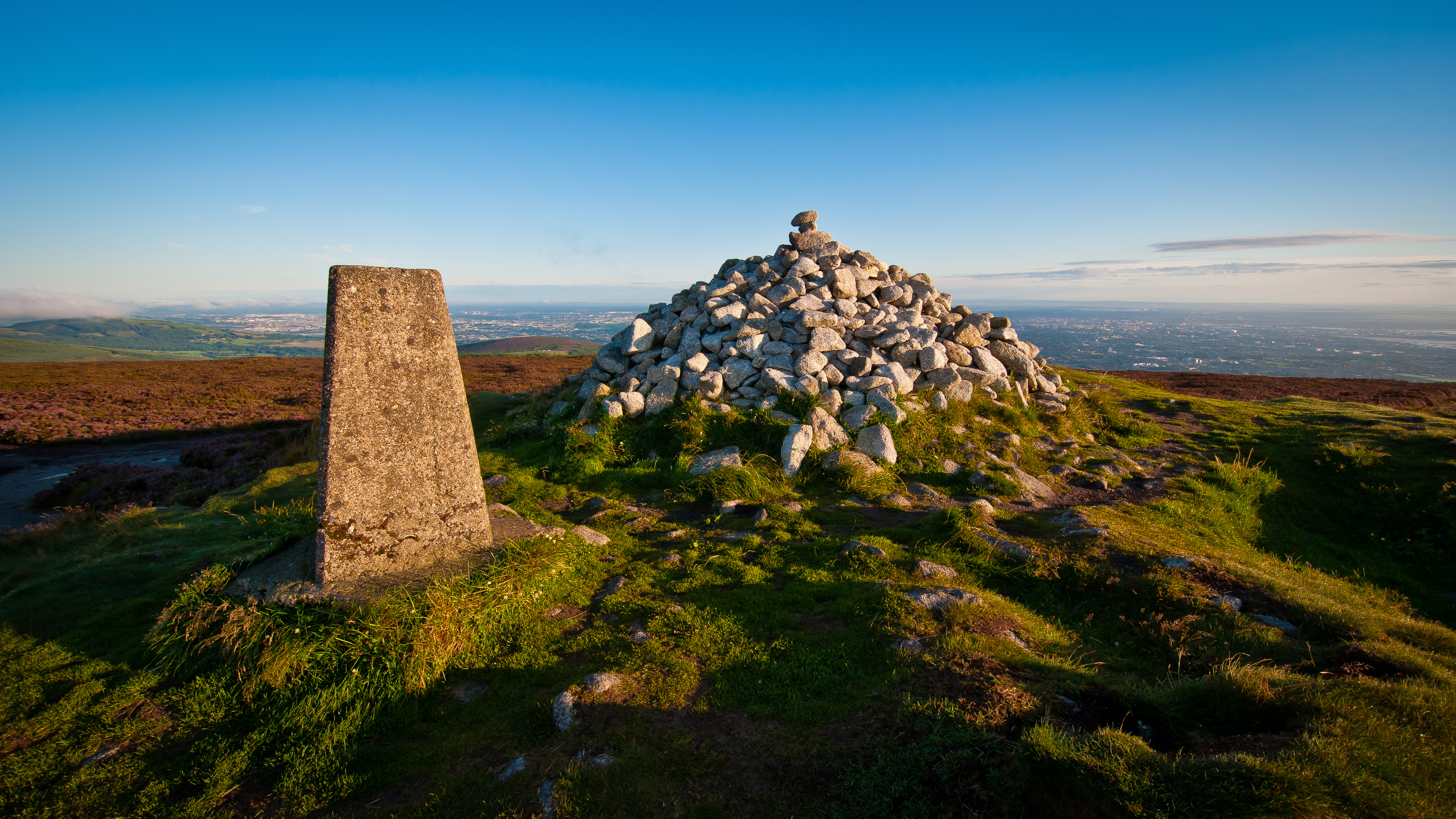
Cairn on Fairy Castle, the summit of Two Rock

Leaving Glencullen, the Way enters forestry at Ballyedmonduff, passing the site of Ballyedmonduff wedge tomb. This Bronze Age wedge-shaped gallery grave consists of three chambers surrounded by a horseshoe arrangement of stones. It was excavated in 1945 and sherds of Beaker pottery, a polished hammer, a possible polishing stone and a flint scraper were found. The trail ascends through the spruce, larch and pine woods of Ticknock forest to reach the summit of Three Rock (449 m or 1,473 ft). This area is dominated by the masts used by RTÉ and other broadcasters for the transmission of radio and television services. The mountain takes its name from the three groups of rocks visible from much of Dublin city and suburbs. It was once believed that these features were man made: for example, in 1780 Gabriel Beranger speculated that they were altars on which sacrifices were offered. In fact, the rocks are granite tors formed naturally over many years by the process of weathering. The middle tor contains a series of bowl-shaped depressions known as bullauns which were used for grinding in early Christian times.

From Three Rock, the trail ascends to the summit of Two Rock Mountain (536 m or 1,759 ft). Known as "Fairy Castle", this is the highest point on the Dublin Mountains Way. The summit is marked by a cairn and a trig pillar. These two features lie upon a raised mound, approximately 25 metres (82 feet) across and 2 metres (7 feet) high and covered in turf and heather: this is the remains of a passage tomb. Due to the collapse of the edges of the cairn, the entrance to the passage can no longer be seen.

=== Tibradden Mountain and Cruagh Wood ===
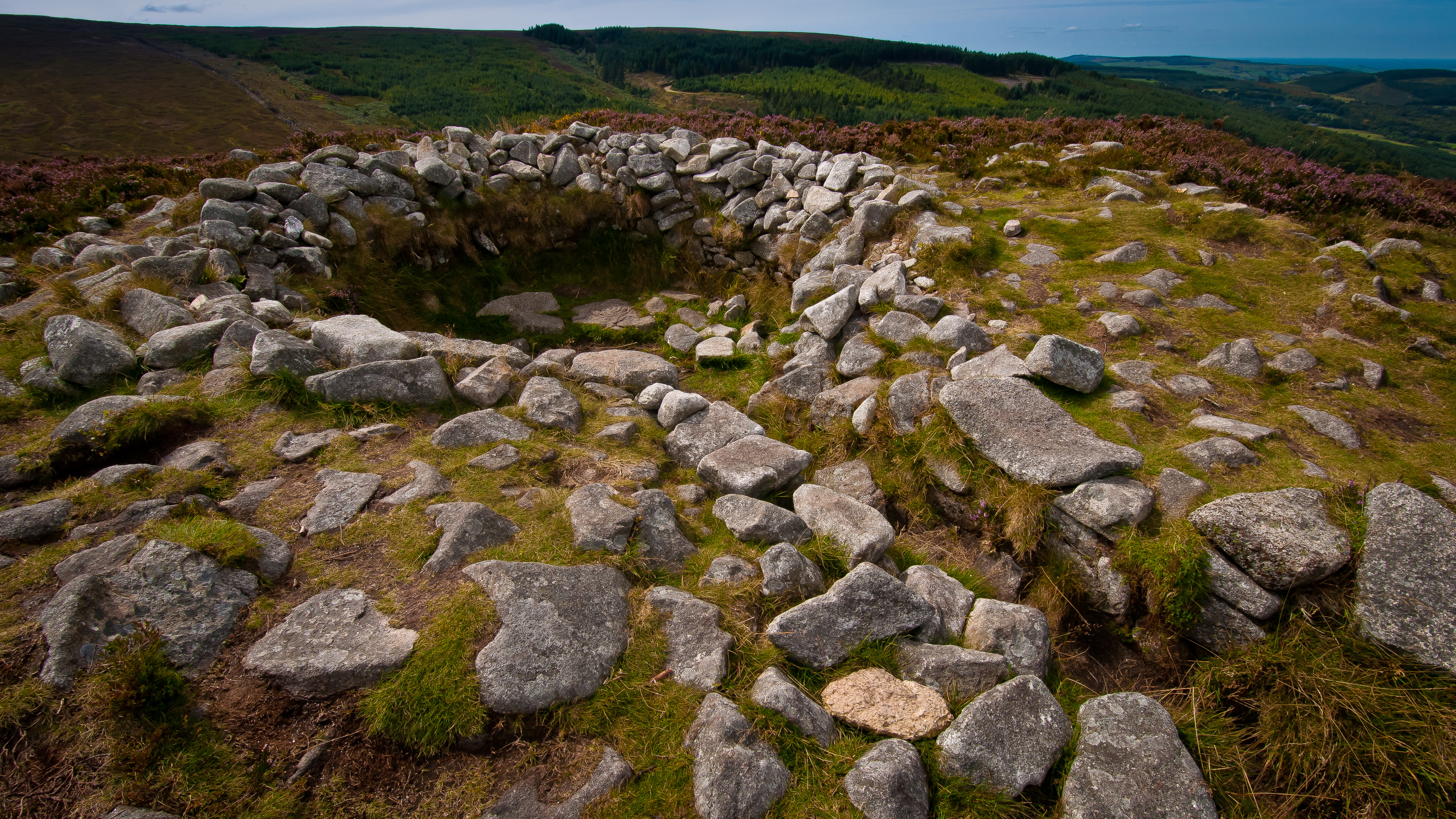
The remains of the chambered cairn at the summit of Tibradden Mountain

From Fairy Castle, the Way follows a ridge to the summit of Tibradden (467 m or 1,532 ft). The geology of the mountain is granite and the southern slopes of the site are strewn with granite boulders. Close to the summit lies the remains of a prehistoric site which was excavated in 1849 by members of the Royal Irish Academy. The burial urn that was found within the monument was removed and now resides at the National Museum of Ireland in Dublin. Following the 1849 excavation, the centre of the cairn was removed to create a circular chamber with a pseudo passage leading to the centre. As a result, the site was for many years thought to be a passage grave. However, conservation works carried out in 1956 revealed it to be a chambered cairn with a cist burial at the centre. Within the chamber itself lies a stone with a spiral pattern.

The trail descends from the summit of Tibradden through the Pine Forest, a mixed woodland area of Scots pine, Japanese larch, European larch, Sitka spruce, oak and beech. Crossing the R116 road and the Owendoher River, it enters Cruagh Wood. The route crosses the wood along the northern slopes of Cruagh Mountain (520 m or 1,710 ft) but does not ascend to the summit. The wood is a mixture of Sitka spruce and larch. As the trail exits Cruagh Wood it passes a stone memorial to the botanist H. C. Hart who, in 1886, made, and won, a bet that he could walk from Terenure in Dublin to the summit of Lugnaquilla in Wicklow in 24 hours. Leaving Cruagh Wood, walkers have the choice of either following a circular spur route via Massy's Estate and the Hell Fire Club or to continue direct to Glenasmole via the Featherbed Forest.

=== Glenasmole and Tallaght ===
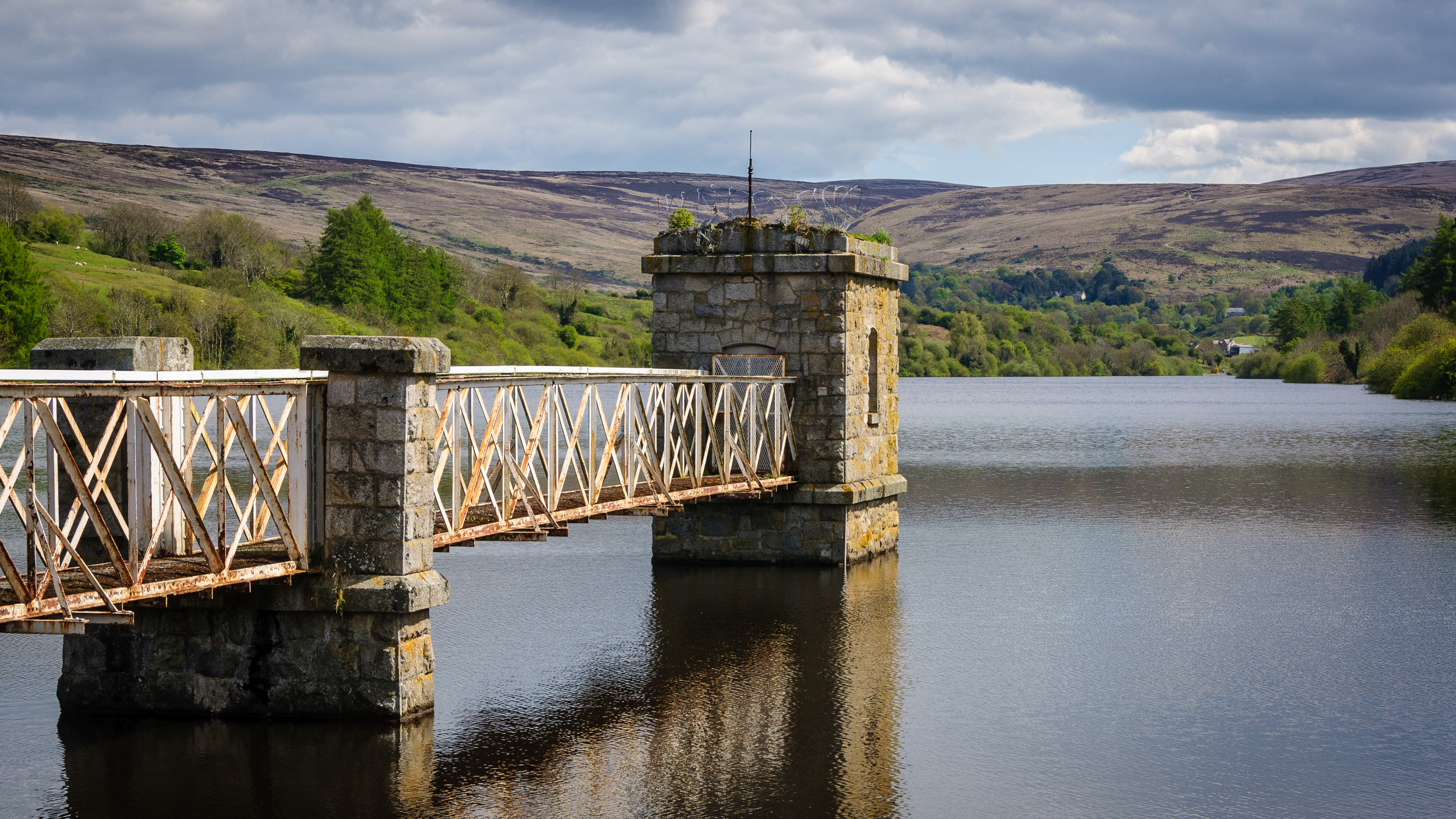
The Upper Reservoir, Bohernabreena waterworks

Emerging from Cruagh Wood, the way follows the R116 to the junction with the R115 known as Viewing Point. From Viewing Point, it briefly follows the R115 before entering Featherbed Forest, emerging onto the Piperstown Road in front of Piperstown Hill. The Way follows a series of minor roads, descending into the Glenasmole Valley, a slender gorge carved out by the River Dodder. The valley is a Special Area of Conservation containing three important habitats: petrifying springs, orchid-rich grassland and Molina meadow. It is a habitat for four endangered floral species: Green-winged Orchid, Small-white Orchid, Yellow Archangel and Yellow Bird's-nest.

The trail follows the road to Castlekelly Bridge after which it enters the Bohernabreena Waterworks. The waterworks were constructed between 1883 and 1887 to provide the townland of Rathmines with drinking water and to supply water for the mills along the Dodder. The Upper Reservoir collects the clear water from the upper end of the valley for use as drinking water. The lake has a surface area of 0.23 km^{2} and a capacity of 1.56 million m^{3}. It is a habitat for whooper swans, moorhens and little grebes. The Way follows the Upper Reservoir, crossing its dam and following the watercourse of the Dodder to the Lower Reservoir. An iron bridge connects the dam to a valve house which controls the flow of water from the reservoir into the water supply pipes. The Lower Reservoir collects the peaty water from the bogland around the valley. It has a surface area of 0.12 km^{2} and a capacity of 0.5 million m^{3}. It was originally built to provide water for the mills along the Dodder but is now used to assist in controlling flooding on the river.

From the waterworks, the trail follows the Dodder through Kiltipper Park and then, after skirting past the housing estates at Ellensborough and Marlfield, enters Sean Walsh Park in Tallaght where the Way finishes at a mapboard with a stone marking the opening of the Tallaght section of the Way by Councillor Eamon Maloney, Mayor of South Dublin County, on 31 October 2010.

== Intersecting and connecting paths ==
The Dublin Mountains Way shares part of its route with the Wicklow Way between Fairy Castle and Tibradden. The Way also shares its route with sections of shorter trails in the forest recreation areas it passes through such as the Lead Mines Way at Carrickgollogan, the Scalp Lookout Trail at Barnaslingan and the nature trail at Massy's Woods.

== Public transport ==
Shankill is served by frequent Dublin Bus and Go-Ahead Ireland services and by the DART rail line. Tallaght is also served by frequent Dublin Bus and Go-Ahead Ireland services as well as the Luas light rail red line. The infrequent Dublin Bus route 44B serves Glencullen. The Dublin Mountaineer bus, operated by the Dublin Mountains Partnership, served several of the forest recreation areas along the Dublin Mountains Way but was discontinued in 2012.
