= Carrickgollogan =

Hill in County Dublin, Ireland

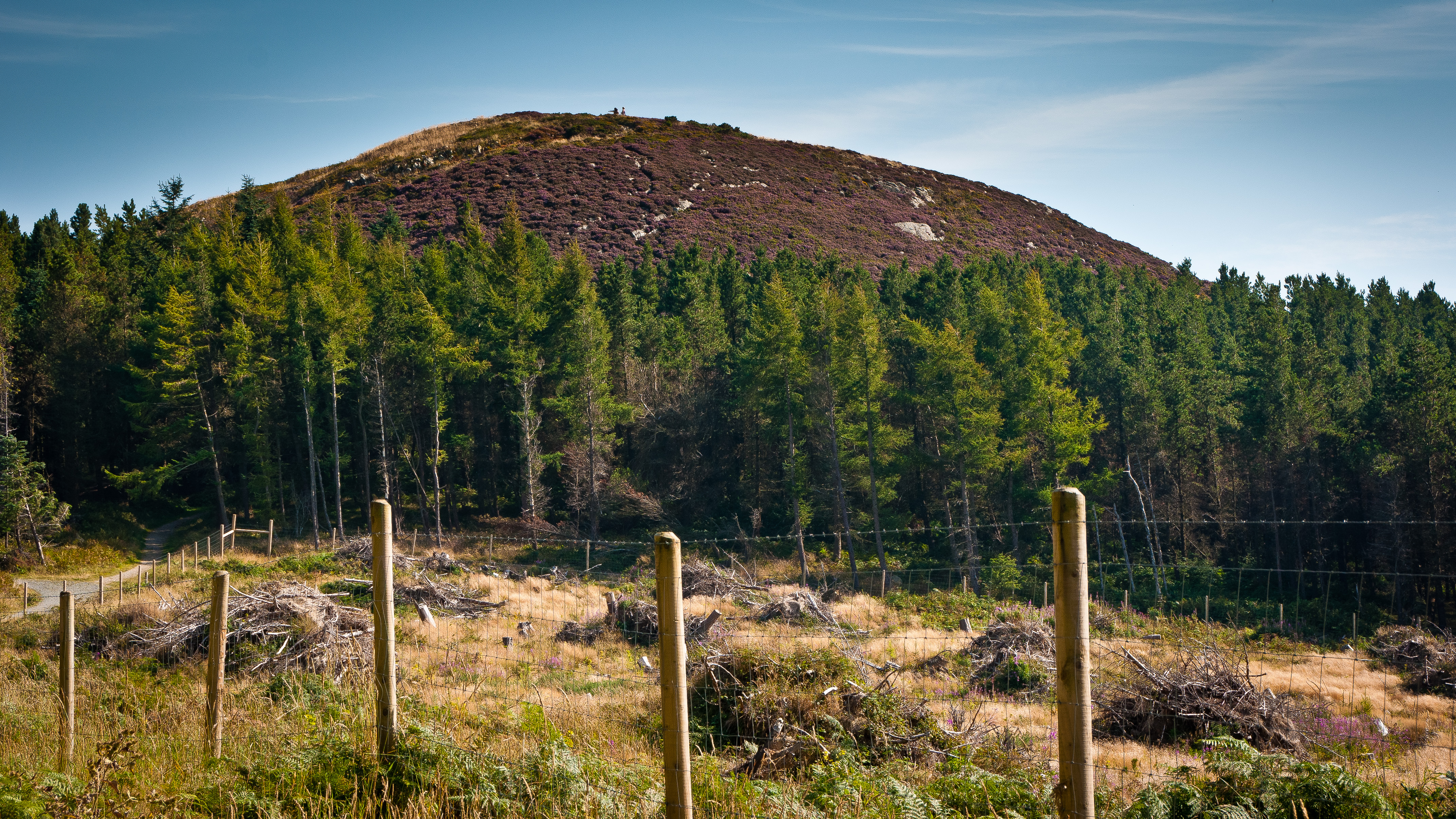

Highest point
- Elevation: 276 m (906 ft)
- Prominence: 118 m (387 ft)
- Coordinates: 53°13′1.37″N 6°9′27.91″W

Naming
- Native name: Carraig Uallacháin (Irish)

Geography
- Location within island of Ireland
- Location: Dún Laoghaire–Rathdown, Ireland
- Parent range: Dublin Mountains
- OSI/OSNI grid: O23142005
- Topo map: OSI Discovery No. 50

Carrickgollogan (Irish: Carraig Uallacháin, meaning 'rock of Uallachán') is a hill in Dún Laoghaire–Rathdown in Ireland, towards the southern border of the traditional County Dublin. It is 276 metres (906 feet) high, on the eastern edge of the Dublin Mountains, rising above the districts of Rathmichael and Shankill. Its summit is noted for the panoramic views it offers of south Dublin and north Wicklow.

== Geography and geology ==
The geological composition of the summit is predominantly quartzite. The high ground is a mixture of heathland and commercial forestry while the lower slopes are mainly farmland. The forest on the mountain is mixed woodland including Lodgepole pine, Noble fir, Japanese larch, Lawson cypress, Scots pine, birch and beech trees and is a habitat for badgers, rabbits and a variety of birds. The area around the summit includes a number of sites of historical interest including the former lead works at Ballycorus and the ruined church and round tower at Rathmichael.

Some of the branches which form the Wood Brook or Crinken Stream rise on the south-western slopes, and, merging with others from near Shankill Castle and south of there, flow under the M11, past Allies River Road and on to the sea just north of Bray.

== Views ==
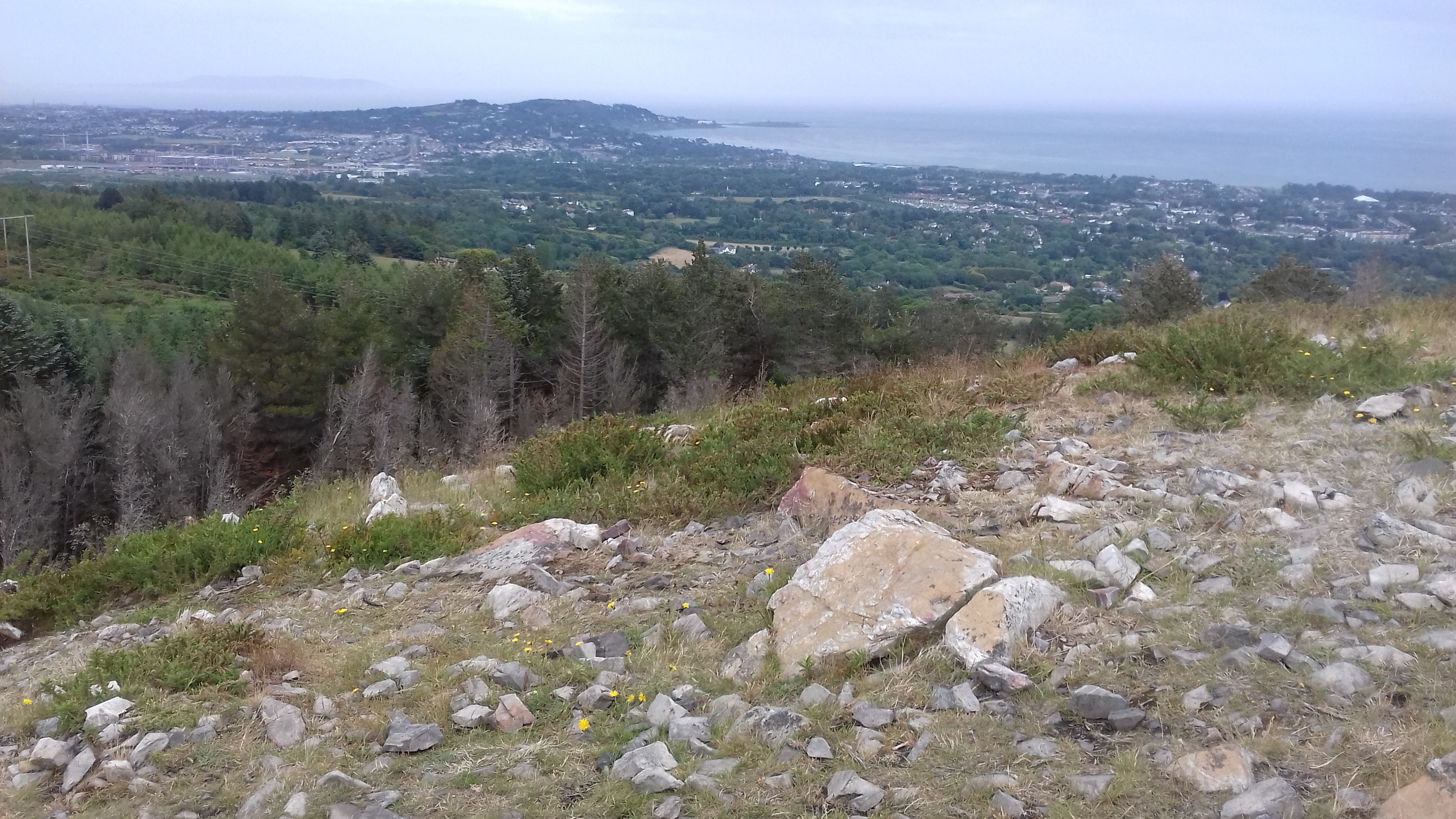
Viewing Dublin Bay to the east from the summit of Carrickgollogan hill

The author Weston St. John Joyce, writing in The Neighbourhood of Dublin (1912), described the vista as "a fine view is obtained of Bray, Howth, Dalkey, and Killiney, the vale of Shanganagh, and Bray Head and town. Between the observer and the sea will be seen Loughlinstown, looking very closely built from this point, like the towns of medieval times, which were built within as small an area as possible, so as to reduce the circuit of the enclosing wall. To the westward will be seen the wooded hill of Barnaslingan, forming the eastern side of the Scalp, beyond that the Two and Three Rock Mountains, and south of these the higher Wicklow hills – War Hill, Djouce, and Duff Hill".

== History ==
=== Ballycorus leadmines ===
The most distinctive landmark to the north of the summit is the ruins of the flue chimney of the former lead works at Ballycorus. Open-cast mining began at this site, just below the western side of the flue chimney, around 1807 and the site was taken over by the Mining Company of Ireland (MCI) in 1826 who undertook underground mining in the area intermittently up until 1863. Two veins of lead and a vein of silver were worked during this period. However, most of the activity at Ballycorus occurred at the smelting facility constructed by MCI in the valley below the mine workings. Here, lead from Ballycorus, as well as lead from mines in counties Donegal, Wicklow and Wexford, was processed using a reverberatory furnace. After the mine was exhausted in the 1860s, the smelting facilities continued to receive and process ore from MCI's mines at Glendalough, County Wicklow. In the 1880s it was no longer commercially viable to process Irish ores and the smelter was put to work processing ore from the Great Laxey mine in the Isle of Man up until closure in 1913.

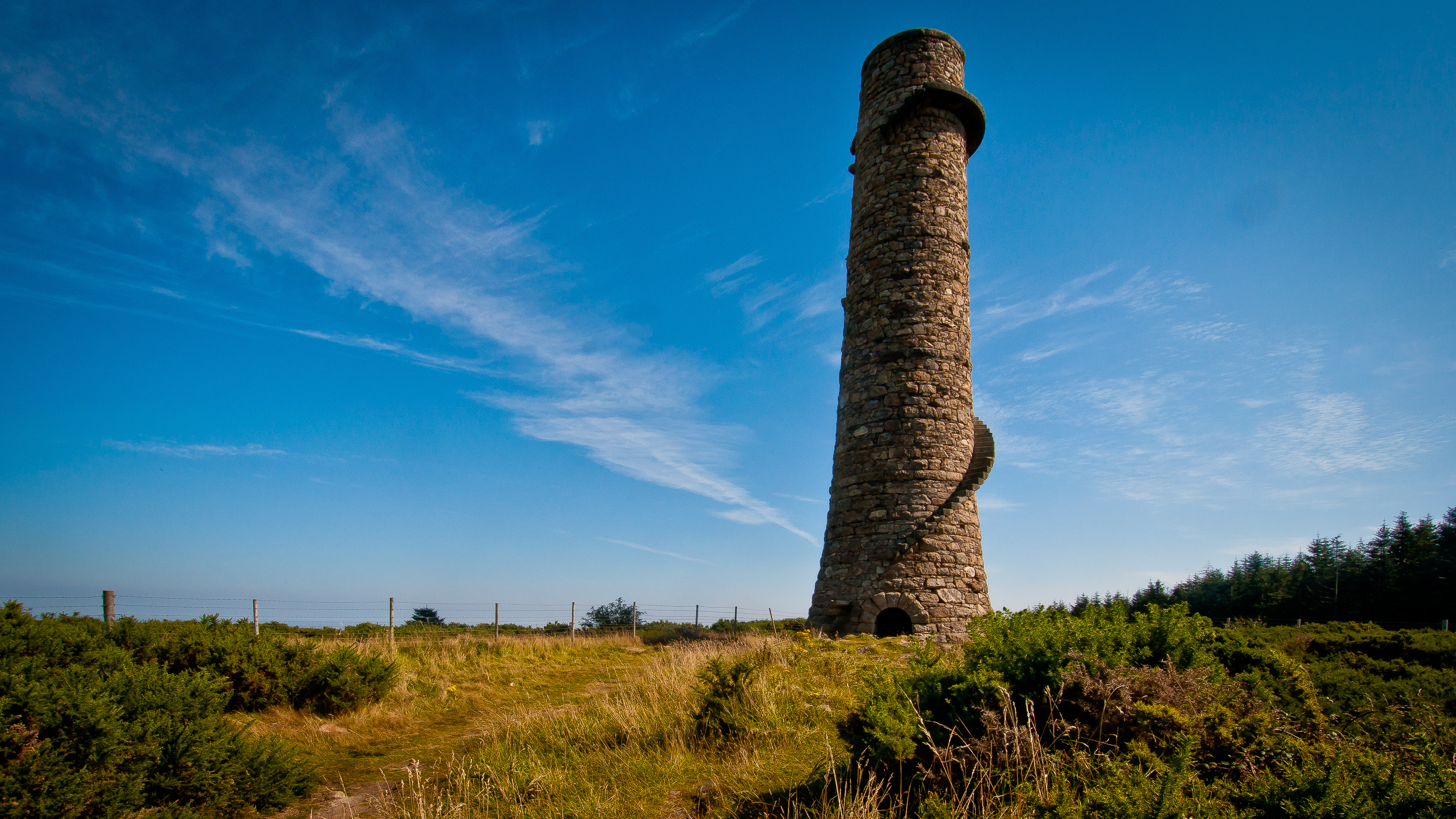
The ruin of the flue chimney at Ballycorus Leadmines

A process had been discovered in the 1770s whereby lead could be extracted from the fumes emitted by reverberatory furnaces if the vapours could be trapped long enough to precipitate the lead. To this end a flue 1 1/4 miles (2.01 kilometres) long running from the lead works and terminating at a chimney near the summit of Carrickgollogan was constructed in 1836. The distinctive granite flue chimney with its external spiral staircase and viewing platform quickly became a noted landmark and was marked on Admiralty charts as a point of reference for mariners. Photographic records show that the flue chimney was originally much taller with an extra brick section, now dismantled, rising above the viewing platform. It is the only example of such a flue and chimney to have been built in Ireland. Weston St. John Joyce noted that the flue was "stated to be one of the best constructed in the United Kingdom". The precipitated lead deposits were scraped out of the flue by hand and many of the workers subsequently died of lead poisoning, giving the surrounding area the nickname "Death Valley".

As well as the remains of the flue chimney, a number of buildings from the smelting works situated in the valley below also survive to the present day. These industrial buildings, all built from granite, include furnaces, purification tanks, lime kilns, stores, workers' cottages and manager's house. Many of these buildings are now private residences. A shot tower, built in 1857, has also survived. An earlier shot tower – described by Joyce as "a handsome and substantial structure, having a spiral stairs within, terminating in an artistic iron veranda on the outside" – built in 1829 no longer survives.

=== Rathmichael old church and round tower ===
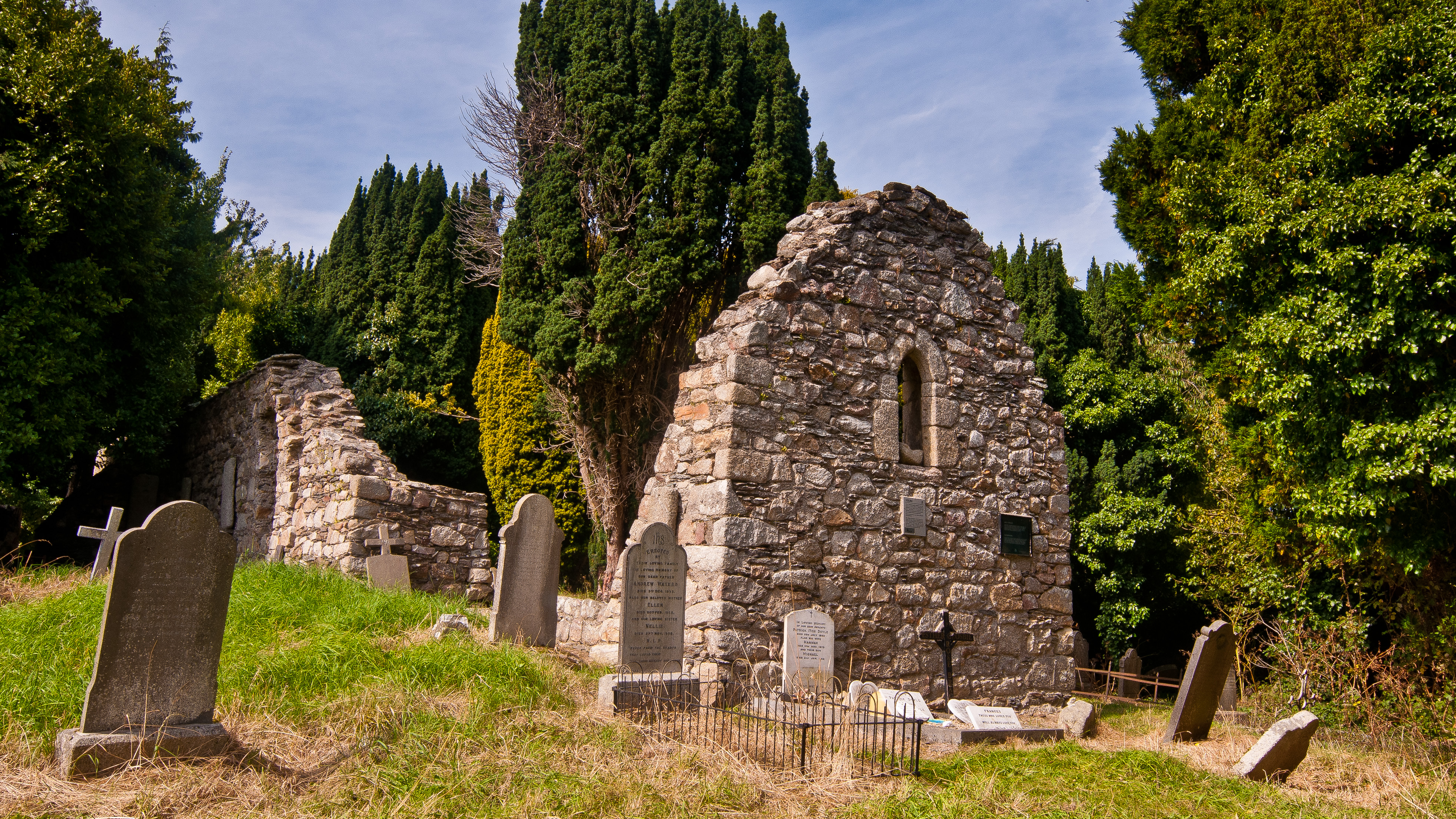
Rathmichael old church

Further down the slopes to the north of the summit lies Rathmichael where the ruins of a church and round tower are found enclosed within the remains of what would once have been one of the largest ringforts in Ireland. The church dates from Norman times but the presence of the round tower and ringfort indicates that the site dates back to early Christian times. Its dedication is believed to be to a saint called MacTail (later corrupted as "Michael") which would date the foundation of the monastery and church to the mid-seventh century. The site also lies close to the route of the pilgrimage route from St. Mary's Church, Dublin to Glendalough. The entrance to the ringfort was 8 feet (2.4 metres) in width and had an arched gateway. The ring wall and mound is approximately 350 feet (110 metres) in diameter and its size suggests the site was the base for an important chieftain. Within the enclosure would have lain a small quadrangular church and a number of monastic huts.

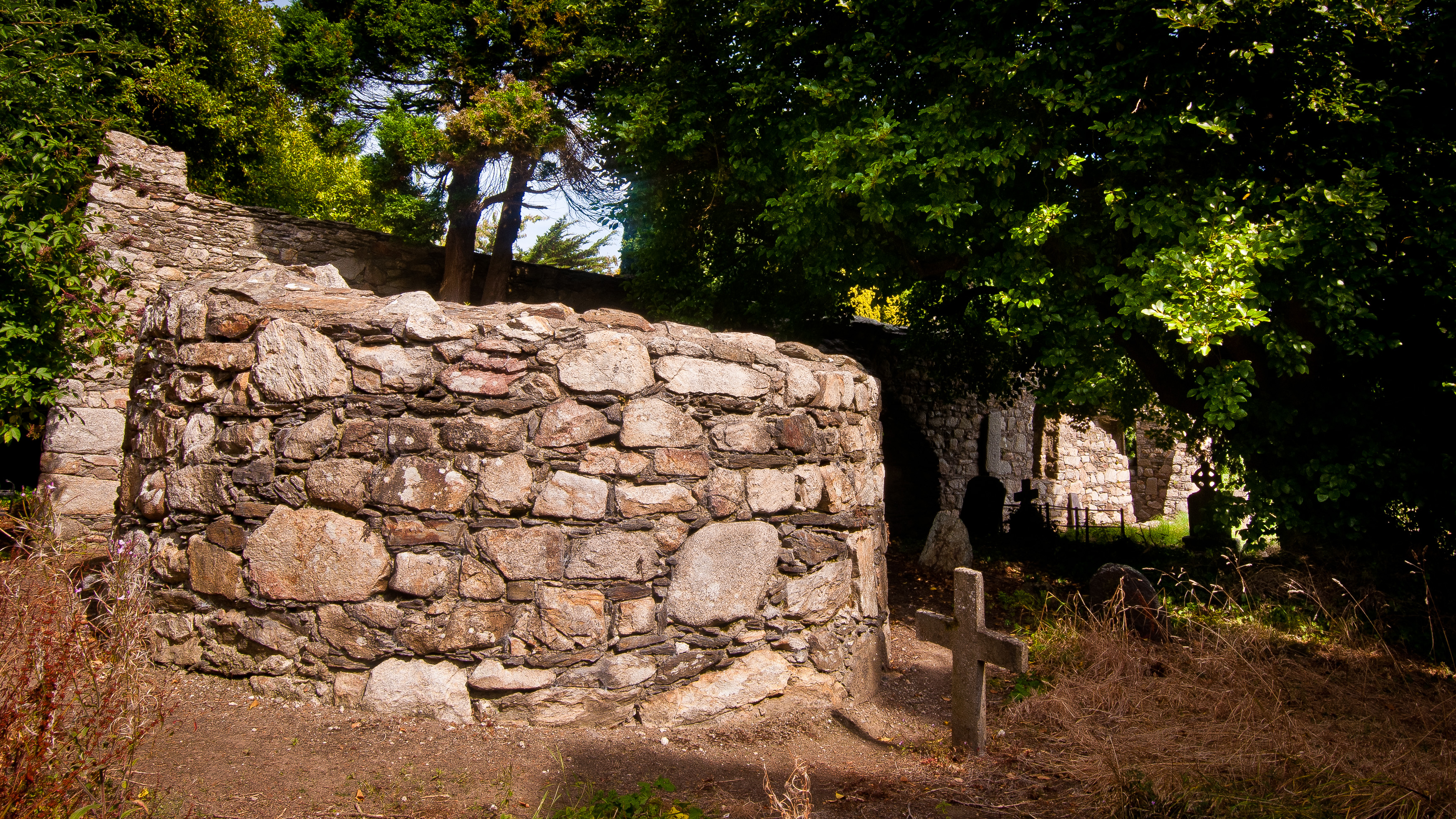
The remains of the round tower

Only the base of the round tower, 2 metres (6.6 feet) high, remains. It has a circumference of 51 feet (16 metres). The tower is known locally as "The Skull Hole", a reference to the occasion when skulls and bones from the adjoining burial ground were deposited there rather than being re-interred when the graveyard was cleared to create additional space. There is a story of an underground passage that leads from the round tower to the sea and of a piper who descended into the passage playing his instrument, never to be seen again. The remains of a passage – possibly a souterrain – have been found close to the tower.

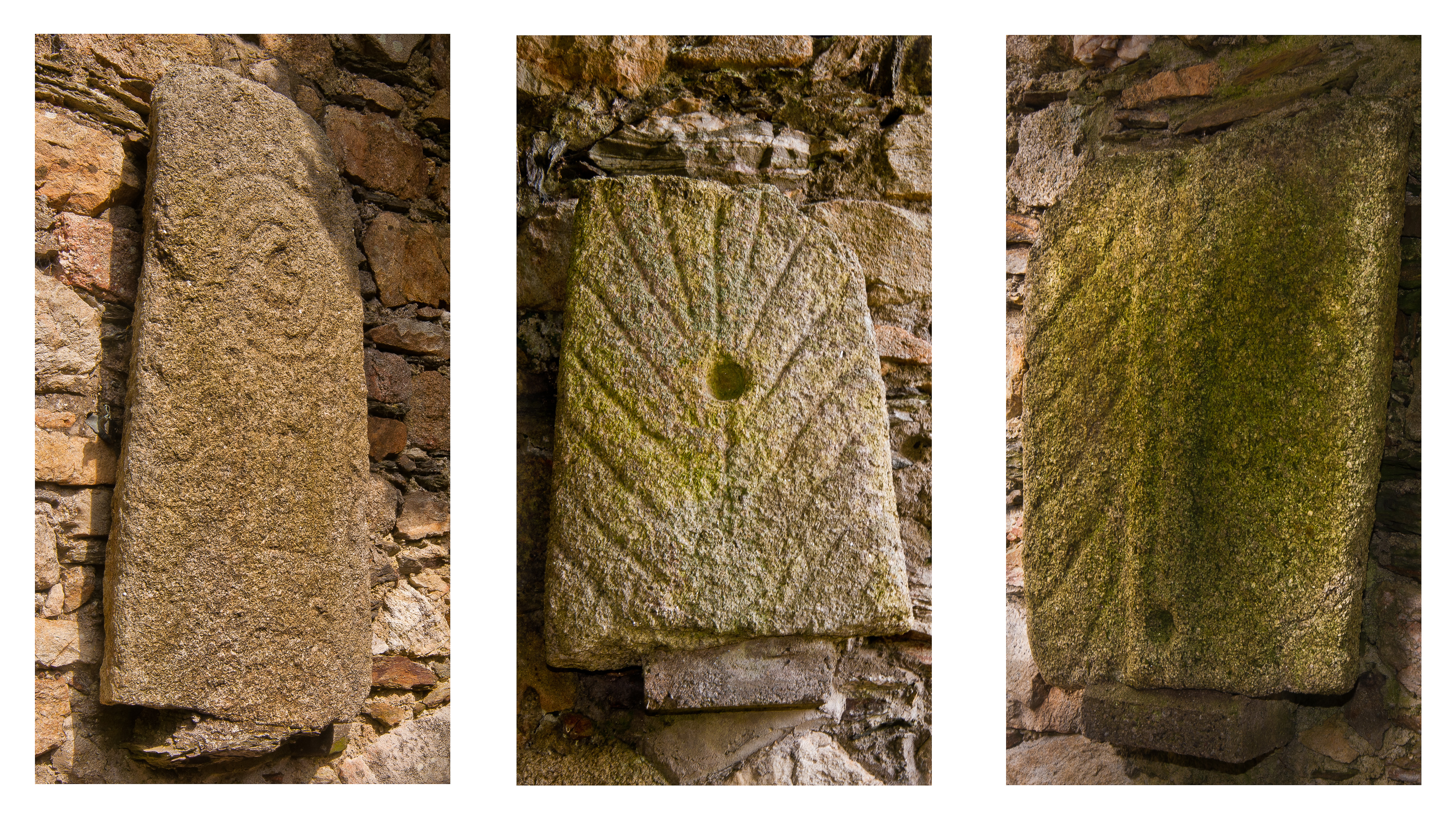
Three examples of the Rathdown slabs at Rathmichael

All that remains of the church is the east gable of a thirteenth-century chancel and the south wall of a twelfth-century nave. The church has lain in ruins since the end of the seventeenth century. It is noted for its collection of grave slabs or leacs known as the Rathdown stones, nine examples of which can be found at the old church in Rathmichael attached to the south wall. Thirty-two examples of these slabs are known around the Rathdown area and are found nowhere else in Ireland. No two stones are the same but share similar types of decoration in the form of concentric circles, cup marks and herring-bone patterns. It was once thought that these slabs dated to pre-Christian times but subsequent research has shown them to have been influenced by Norsemen art styles and they are now believed to be gravemarkers of Norsemen Christians.

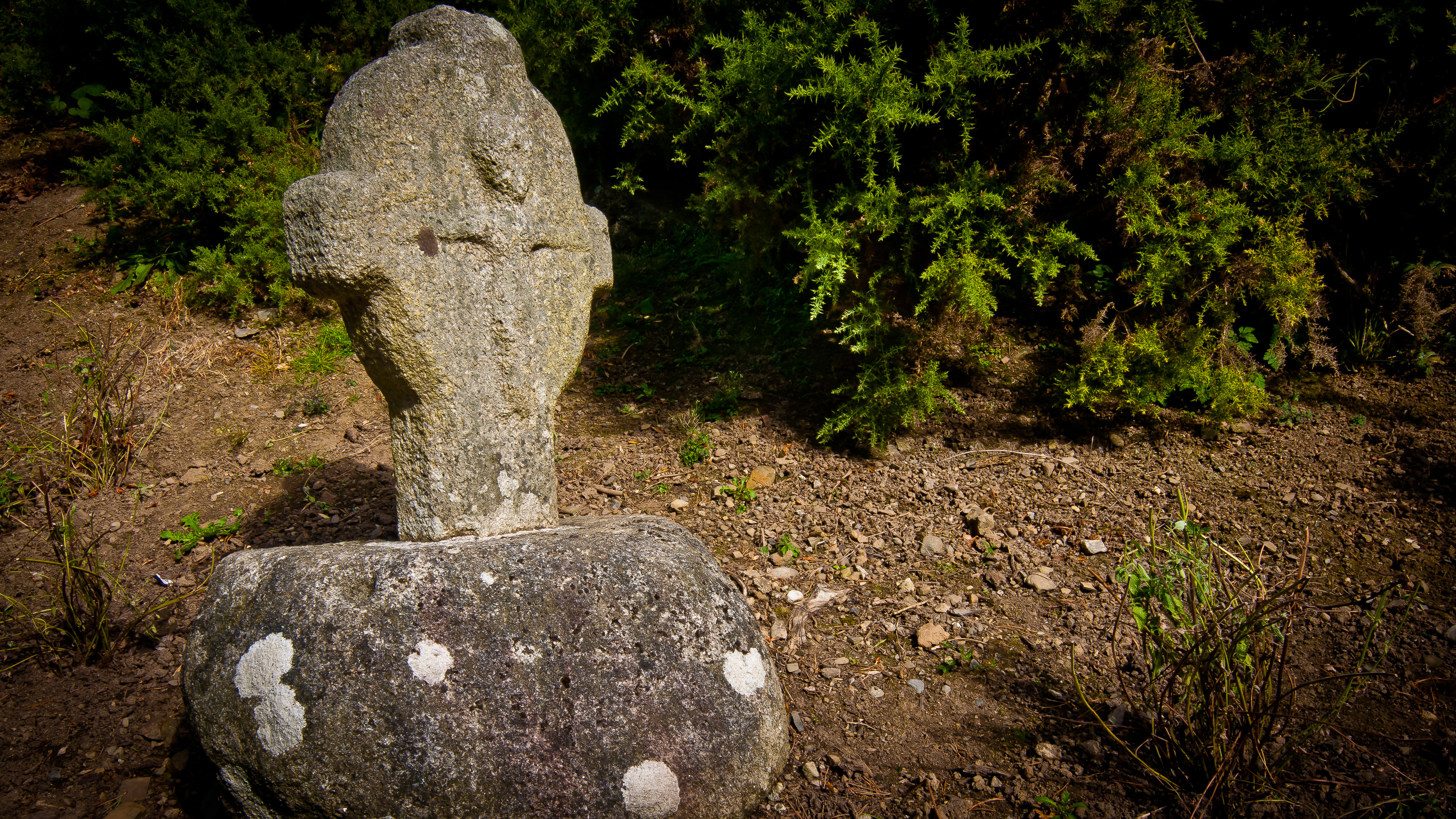
The Little Cross, one of the Fassaroe crosses, at Rathmichael Lane

Along Rathmichael Lane, which once would have led to the old Rathmichael Church, is a twelfth-century cross with a Crucifixion scene in high relief set in a granite boulder base. This is one of a series of crosses – known as the Fassaroe Crosses – to be found in the locality, all of which are believed to have been the work of the same stonemason. The base is in its original location but the cross itself was found in the remains of the church in neighbouring Kiltuck and reunited with its base in 1910. The cross is unusual in that there is a Crucifixion scene on both faces. Competing theories for the purpose of the cross are that it marked a route between the churches at Rathmichael and Kiltuck or that it marked the site of another, now long gone, church. There is a story associated with this cross involving General George Cockburn of Shanganagh Castle who was a noted collector of antiquities. Cockburn coveted the cross and dispatched two men to retrieve it for his collection. When they attempted to move the artefact a great wind blew up and heavy rain fell. They succeeded in loading it onto their cart but then their horse bolted and they had to pull the cart themselves. Finally, a serious accident occurred to one of the men while unloading the cross and further misfortune befell his family.

=== Puck's Castle ===
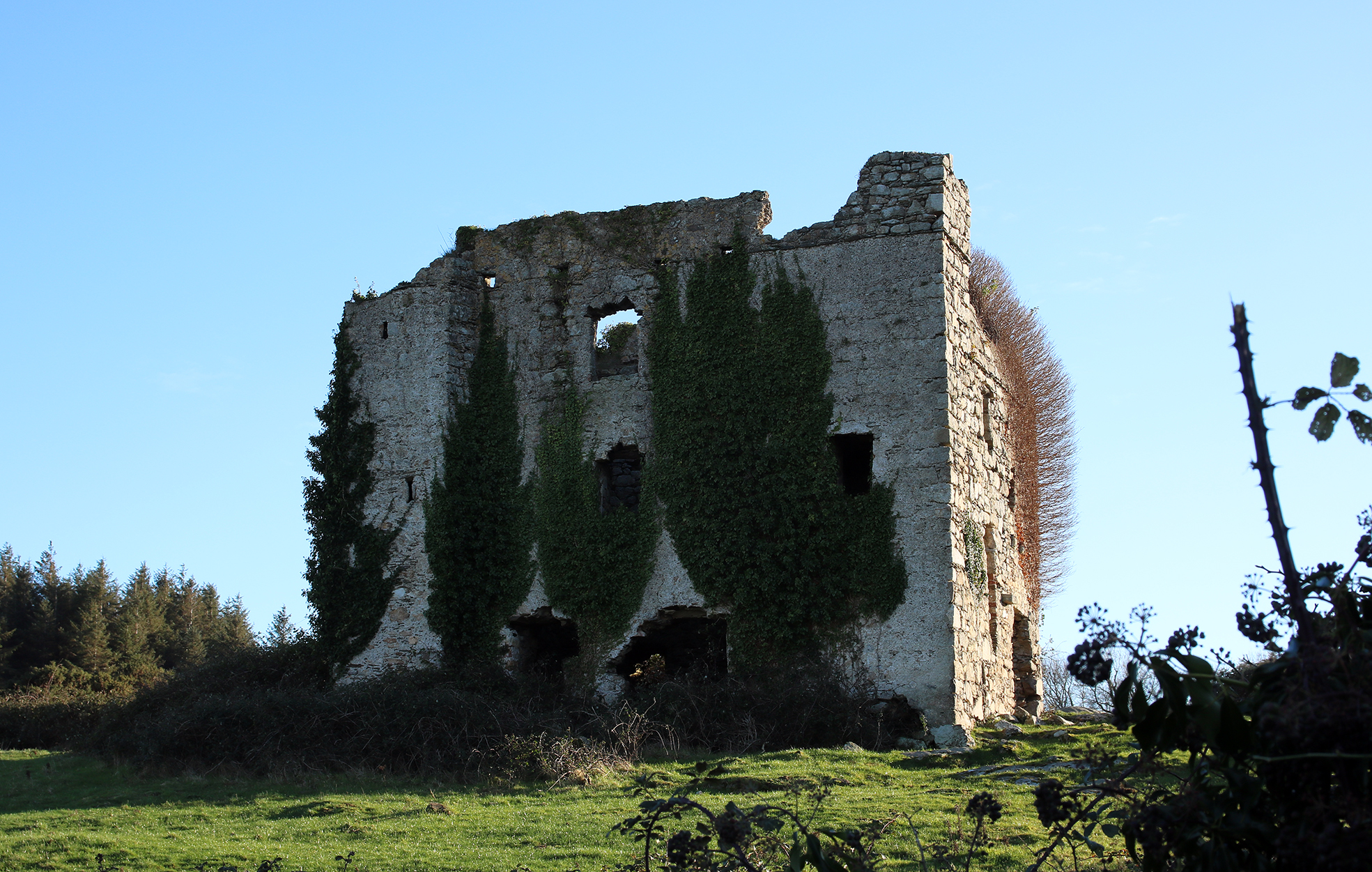
Puck's Castle

Also to the north is the ruins of a fortified dwelling known as "Puck's Castle". The origin of the name may be related to the story of a fairy (or púca) piper said to hop from rock to rock playing his pipe or it may refer to the feral goats that inhabit the hills. Francis Erlington Ball in A History of the County Dublin suggests that the building was erected around 1537 by Peter Talbot to defend the lands from incursions by the O'Toole clan. It is a small rectangular building, 6.7 metres (22 feet) by 4.5 metres (15 feet) internally, two stories high with 1.3 metres (4.3 feet) thick walls. James II visited the castle following the Battle of the Boyne in 1690 while his army was camped at nearby Lehaunstown and left a gift of silver for his host, Peter Lawless. Some alterations were made to the building in the eighteenth century including a fireplace and chimney. An engraving by George Petrie around 1819 shows two thatched cottages built onto one side of the castle.

=== Alcock memorial ===
The Alcock memorial on the slopes of Carrickgollogan

To the south of the summit is a plaque embedded in the rockface containing a memorial to a Doctor Nathaniel Alcock erected by his daughters in 1914. The inscription reads, "To the Memory of One who Worshipped Here. Doctor Nathaniel Alcock Died 4 April 1904 in His 65th Year. "A Wise Man is Never so busy as in the Solitary Contemplation of God And the Worship of Nature" Seneca. Erected by his Two Friends".

=== Prehistoric monuments ===
Fieldwork carried out by the Ordnance Survey in the nineteenth century indicates that there were several prehistoric monuments on or near Carrickgollogan. Little evidence of them remains today. A structure of three stones in a trilithon arrangement lies in a field to the south of the summit and it is uncertain as to whether this is the remains of a wedge tomb or a portal tomb. On the east side of the mountain a wedge tomb with a 2.35 metres (7.7 feet) long gallery was discovered during the laying of a gas pipeline. It has since been reburied.

== Access and recreation ==
Carrickgollogan lies within a Coillte-owned forest recreation area which is managed by the Dublin Mountains Partnership. There are approximately 8 kilometres (5.0 miles) of trails in the recreation area, including a waymarked trail called the Lead Mines Way. There is also a permanent orienteering course. Carrickgollogan is also traversed by the Dublin Mountains Way.
