= Rathmichael =

Southern suburb of Dublin, Ireland

Rathmichael Ráth Mhichíl (Irish)
- Suburb
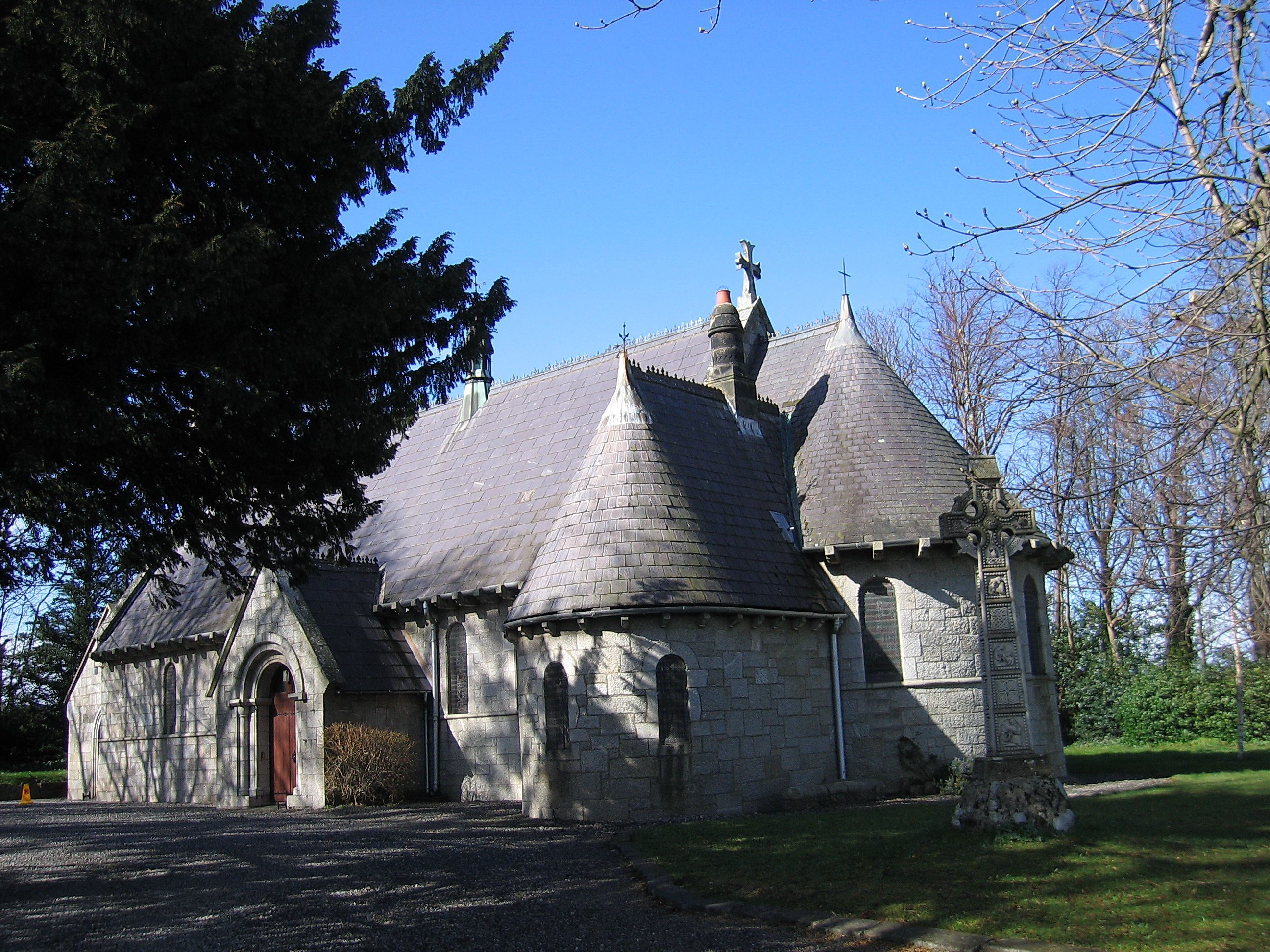
- Church of Ireland Parish Church

- Location in Dublin
- Coordinates: 53°13′53″N 6°09′23″W
- Country: Ireland
- Province: Leinster
- County: County Dublin
- Local authority: Dún Laoghaire-Rathdown County Council
- Elevation: 113 m (371 ft)

Rathmichael (Irish: Ráth Mhichíl) is a suburb on the southside of Dublin, in the local government area of Dún Laoghaire–Rathdown, near the southern border of County Dublin with County Wicklow. It is situated west of Shankill from which it is, roughly, separated by the M50/M11 motorways. It is also a civil parish in the barony of Rathdown.

== Etymology ==
The modern Irish name Ráth Mhichíl appears to be derived from an English corruption. Thus, Rathmichael is likely to have come from Ráth Mhic Táil, meaning "Mac Táil's Ringfort".

== Location and nature ==
Rathmichael is an affluent suburb, characterised by extensive tracts of low-density dwellings, with large houses and gardens interspersed with open areas. It rises to the west towards the hill of Carrickgollogan in the foothills of the Dublin Mountains. The chimney of the disused lead mines and the ruins of Puck's Castle on the northern flank of Carrickgollogan overlook the area. Multiple small streams come together to form the Wood Brook or Crinken Stream in the area, flowing to the sea north of Bray.

== History ==
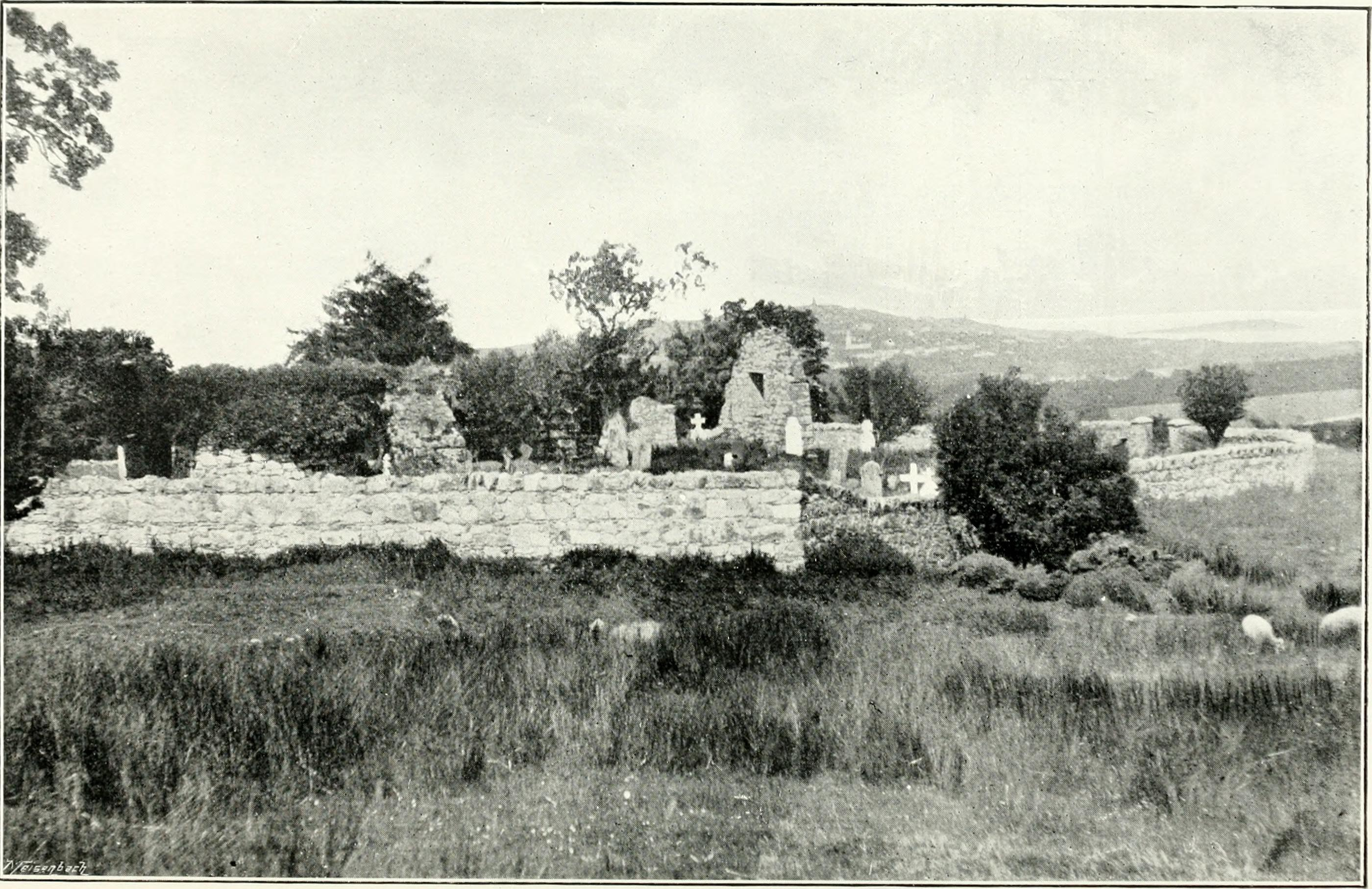
The ruined church at Kilmichael (1902 photograph)

The ruins of a church are found near the remains of what would once have been one of the largest ringforts (ráth) in Ireland. According to a Historic Landscape Character Assessment which was conducted for nearby Barnacullia, "At Rathmichael, there is evidence of a later Bronze Age hillfort, which encloses a ringfort with a souterrain (underground tunnel or chamber). This may have been a ceremonial site, and suggests social organisation of the inhabitants of this period". The church is believed to be dedicated to a saint called Mac Táil, which was later corrupted as "Michael".

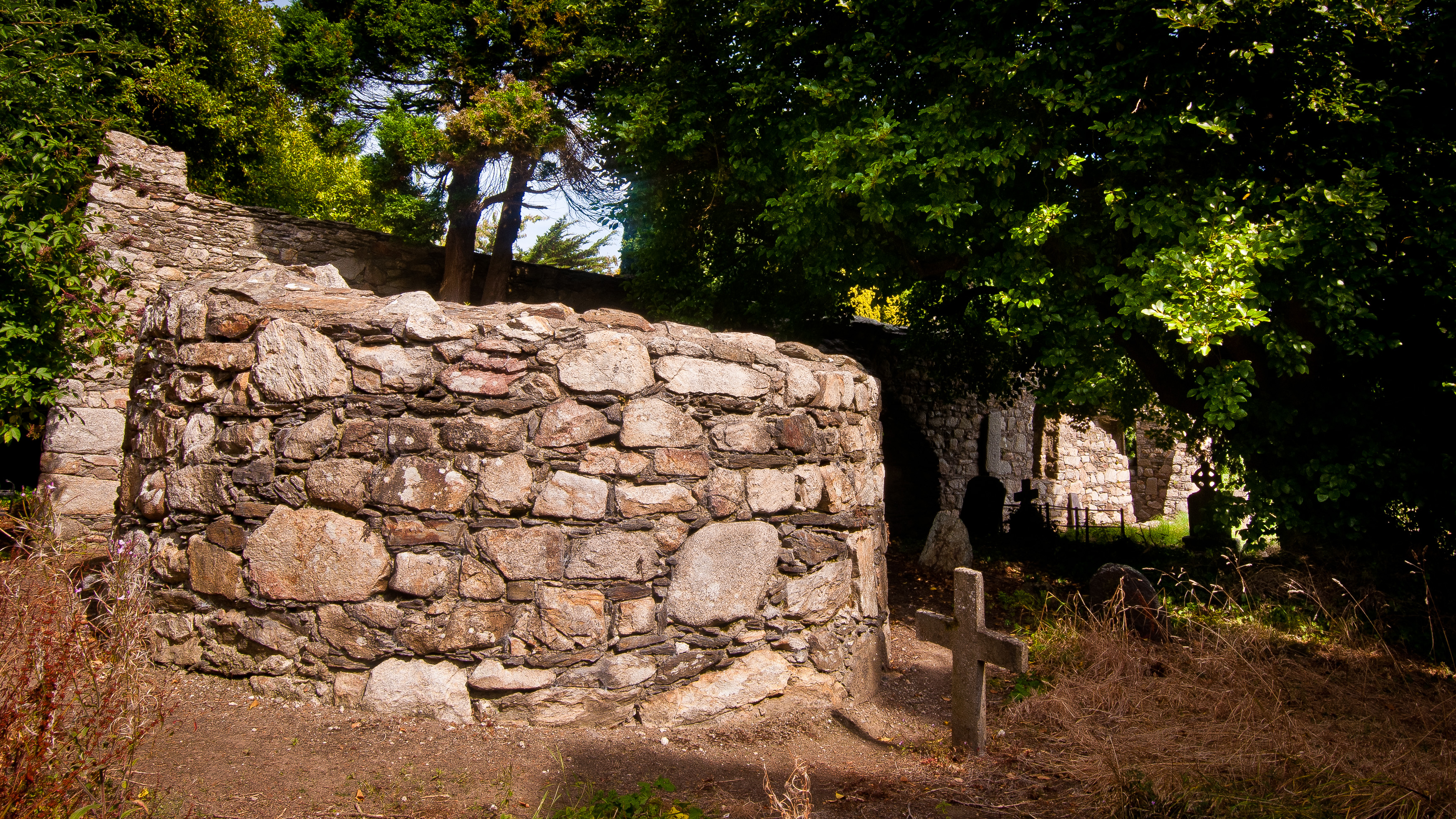
The remains of the round tower

At the west end of the church are the remains of a round tower, 2 metres (6.6 feet) high. It has a circumference of 51 feet (16 metres). The tower is known locally as "The Skull Hole", a reference to the occasion when skulls and bones from the adjoining burial ground were deposited there rather than being re-interred when the graveyard was cleared to create additional space. There is a story of an underground passage that leads from the round tower to the sea and of a piper who descended into the passage playing his instrument never to be seen again. The remains of a passage – possibly a souterrain – have been found close to the tower. The site is a National monument.

== Amenities ==
Rathmichael Parish National School is attached to the Church of Ireland Parish of Rathmichael. Aravon Preparatory School, which closed in 2013, was the oldest school of its kind in Ireland, being 151 years old.

Also present are Old Conna Golf Club (on Ferndale Road), Rathmichael Church and graveyard (Church of Ireland), and the oldest house in southern County Dublin, The Old Glebe House; Jonathan Swift may have written part of Gulliver's Travels while staying here.

== People ==
- Michael Fingleton, former chief executive of Irish Nationwide Building Society lives in Rathmichael with his wife Eileen.
- Pádraig Harrington, international golfer and winner of the 2007 and 2008 British Open and the 2008 USPGA tournaments, lives in Rathmichael.
- Ireland men's field hockey internationals, Kyle Good and Alan Sothern, both attended Rathmichael Parish National School.

== See also ==
- List of abbeys and priories in Ireland (County Dublin)

== Sources ==
- Corlett, Christiaan (1999). Antiquities of Old Rathdown. The archaeology of south County Dublin and north County Wicklow. Bray, County Wicklow: Wordwell. ISBN 1-869857-29-1.
- Ball, Francis Erlington (1905). A History of the County Dublin (PDF). Vol. Part 3. Dublin: Alex Thom & Co.
- Pearson, Peter (1998). Between the Mountains and the Sea. Dun Laoghaire-Rathdown County. Dublin: O'Brien Press. ISBN 0-86278-582-0.
- Donnelly, Most Rev. N. (1977) [first published 1905 as A Short History of Some Dublin Parishes]. Short Histories of Dublin Parishes. Part V: Parishes of Sandyford; Glencullen; Killiney; Little Bray; Cabinteely. Dublin: Carraig Chapbooks.
