= Mining Company of Ireland =

The Mining Company of Ireland (MCI) was a mining company which operated in Ireland, starting in 1824.

== History ==
Mining Company of Ireland Act 1824
- Act of Parliament
- Parliament of the United Kingdom
- Long title: An Act to enable the Mining Company of Ireland to sue and be sued in the Name of their Secretary, or of One of the Members of the said Company.
- Citation: 5 Geo. 4. c. clviii

Dates
- Royal assent: 24 June 1824

The Mining Company of Ireland (MCI) was formed in 1824 by an act of Parliament, the Mining Company of Ireland Act 1824 (5 Geo. 4. c. clviii) following an inaugural meeting of interested philanthropic gentlemen in Dublin on 5 February 1824 in the Dublin Chamber of Commerce. The company initially offered four thousand £25 shares, at a maximum of 25 shares per person.

MCI purchased Luganure Mine, County Wicklow, and worked it for 66 years. Over this time it yielded 50,000 tonnes of lead and 25,000 ounces of silver. The company also prospected at the copper mine at Ballydehob, County Cork in the 1850s. It leased an iron ore mine at the Glen of Imaal in 1859, but this endeavour was not successful. From 1826, MCI mined lead at Ballycorus, County Dublin. At the Mardyke, Killenaule, County Tipperary, the MCI leased land for 21 years to mine coal, and it was the mining operations that resulted in a village developing around it.

The MCI operated at a loss at a number of their mines, including the Mardyke, during the Great Famine. The mining industry in Ireland grew until the 1860s, when the events surrounding the American Civil War led to the collapse in mineral prices and the Irish mining industry.
