= Barnaslingan =

Hill in County Dublin, Ireland

- Barr na Slinneán
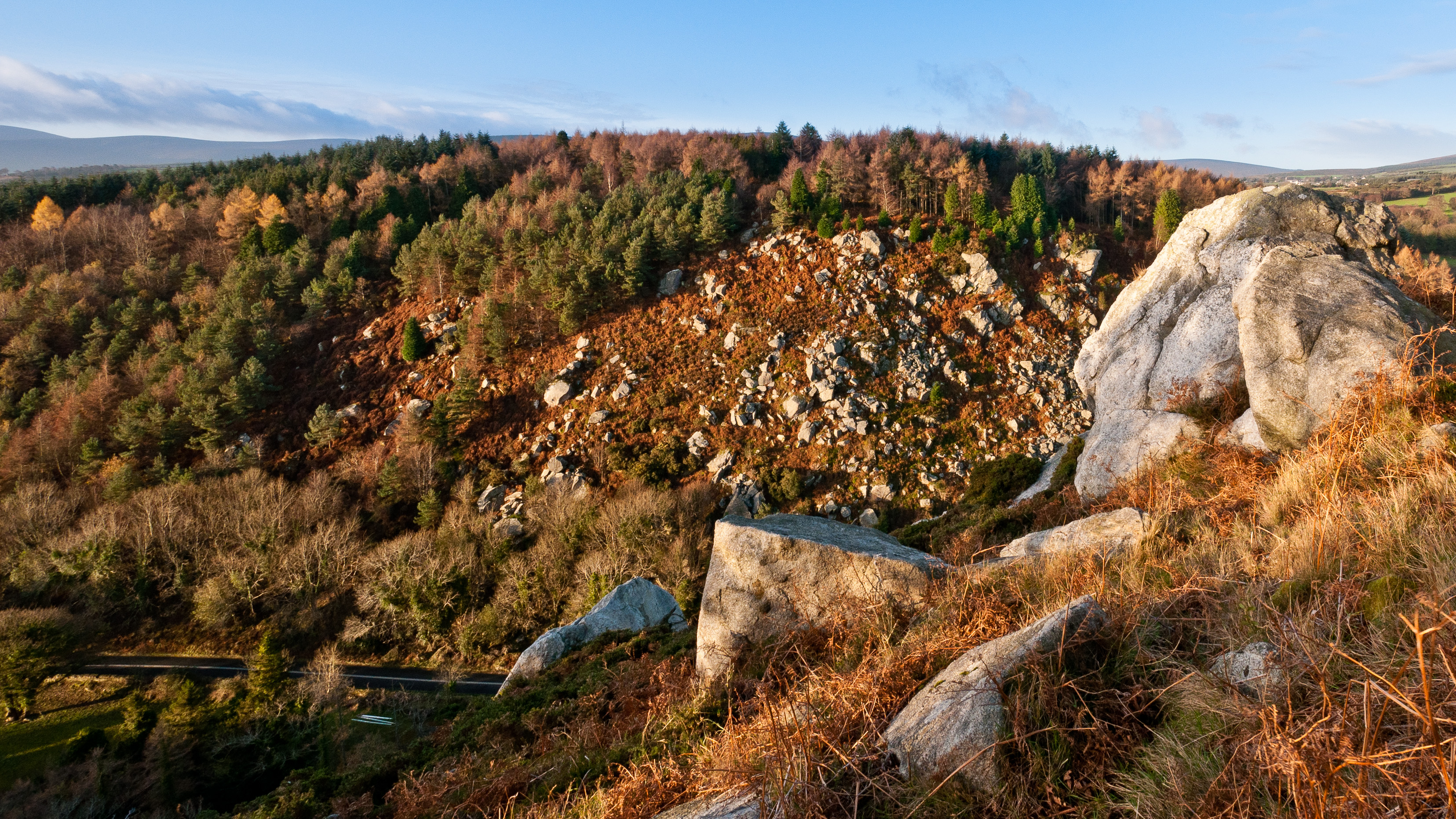
- Looking across The Scalp from the summit of Barnaslingan

Highest point
- Elevation: 238 m (781 ft)
- Coordinates: 53°13′10.04″N 6°10′35.9″W

Geography
- Location within island of Ireland
- Location: County Dublin, Ireland
- Parent range: Dublin Mountains
- OSI/OSNI grid: O2191620294
- Topo map: OSI Discovery #50

Barnaslingan (Irish: Barr na Slinneán, meaning 'summit of the shoulder blades') is a 238 metres (781 feet) high hill in County Dublin, Ireland. It is most noted for the geological feature known as The Scalp (Irish: An Scailp, meaning 'the chasm' or "cleft") that lies to the west of the summit.

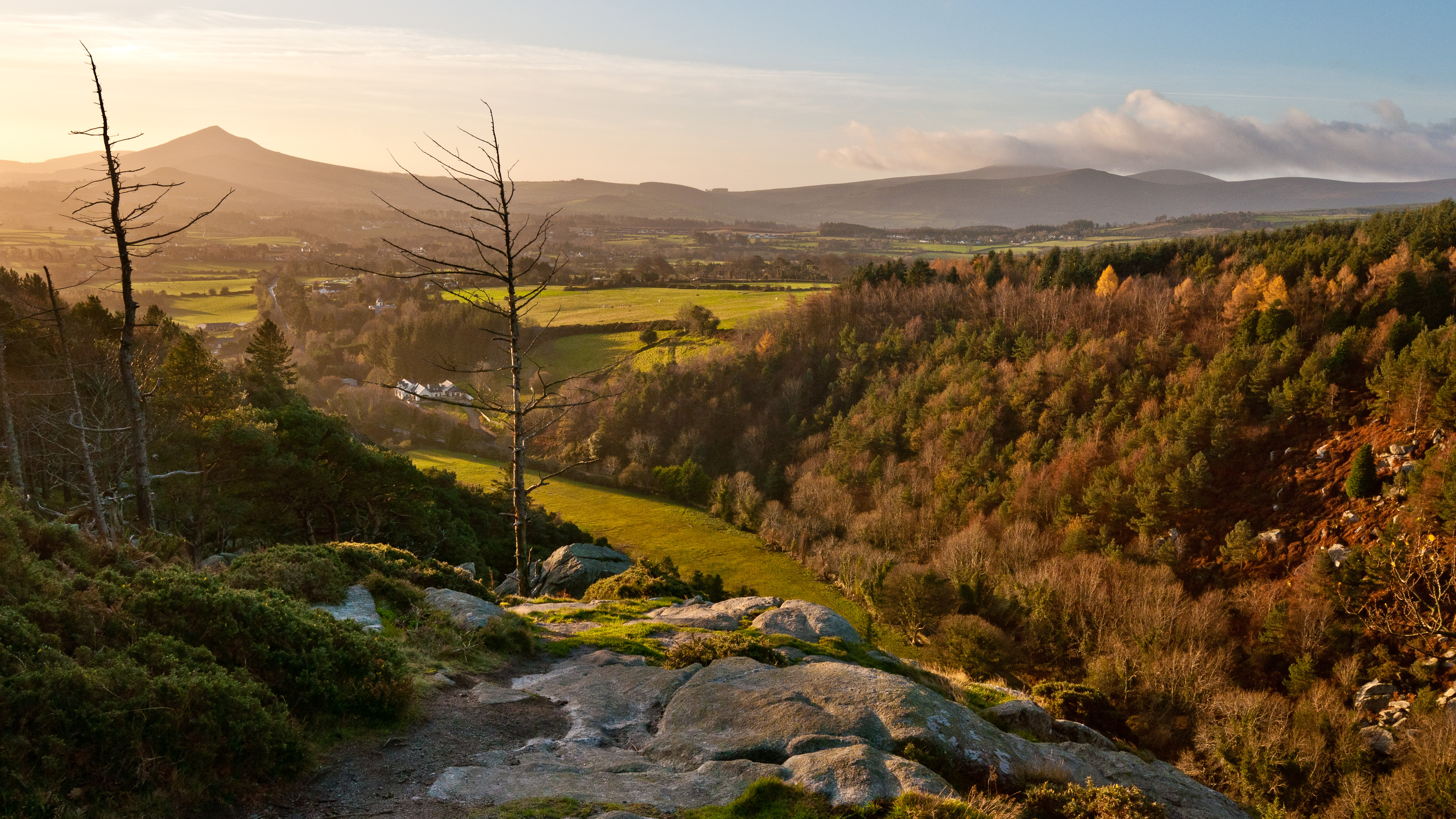
The Scalp, KIlternan, Dublin, looking south

The Scalp comprises a deep channel that was formed by meltwater erosion during deglaciation towards the end of the last Ice Age, approximately 12,000 years ago. Initially the Scalp was a subglacial channel, formed under the ice. It later carried surface glacial outwash from the north into Glacial Lake Enniskerry, draining the ice sheet which covered the Irish Midlands close to its zone of convergence with Irish Sea Glacier. The channel carried huge amounts of subglacial meltwater resulting in a very high energy meltwater flow. This is the basis for the Scalp’s unusual depth and size. The Scalp is oriented north–south, and extends for a distance of approximately 700m. As a site of geological/geomorphological significance, it is listed as an Area of Scientific Interest. The steep, rocky slopes are home to a herd of feral goats and the area is also a habitat for deer and badgers.

The route of the R117 road passes through The Scalp between Kilternan and Enniskerry. Even though the floor of the valley is quite narrow, a small number of buildings are situated along the roadside. The most prominent of these is the Scalp Service Station; prior to 1963 this was a ballroom called “The New Era”. Another house, now a private residence, was a tea room called “Butler's Tea House”.

Overlooking the area is the Kilternan Golf and Country Club which first opened as a hotel in 1970. It is built around a nineteenth-century house called Springfield which was once the home of the poet and mathematician George Darley (1795-1846). In 2001 the hotel was purchased by the hotelier and developer Hugh O'Regan who commenced a major redevelopment and expansion of the property. Although the work is 90 percent complete, Mr O'Regan's companies went into liquidation in 2009 and its future is uncertain. The land around the hotel is also the site of a dry ski slope and headquarters of the Ski Club of Ireland; it continues to operate.

Barnaslingan lies within a Coillte-owned forest recreation area which is managed by the Dublin Mountains Partnership. There are a number of waymarked walking trails in the woods as well as a permanent orienteering course. Barnaslingan is also traversed by the Dublin Mountains Way.

== Appraisals ==
Samuel Lewis, in A Topographical Dictionary of Ireland (1837), described the Scalp thus: "A deep natural chasm in the mountain, forming a defile with lofty and shelving ramparts on each side, from which large detached masses of granite many tons of weight have fallen, on each side large masses of detached rock are heaped together in wild confusion, apparently arrested in their descent, and threatening at every moment to crush the traveller by their fall."

Approximately 50 years later, M. J. B. Baddeley, writing of the attraction for a tourist guidebook, summarised the location thus: "The view from the defile is good but not of particular interest, and the excursion is not one to be recommended to people whose time is limited."
