= Ski Club of Ireland =

Coordinates: 53.22018°N 6.18388°W

The Ski Club of Ireland owns and runs the largest artificial ski slope in Ireland. It is located in County Wicklow close to the village of Kilternan (County Dublin).

== History ==
The Ski Club of Ireland was founded in 1963 and a few years later ran its first ski slope in Knockrabo in Goatstown, south County Dublin.

In the mid-1970s the club moved from Goatstown to its present location close to Kilternan.

== Facilities ==
The ski club has four ski slopes: a main slope (180 meters long), an intermediate slope (130 meters long) and two nursery slopes. The slopes' surfaces are covered in Dendix, a by-product of brush manufacturing which is similar to a short haired brush with the bristles sticking upwards. Dendix is manufactured in Chepstow in the United Kingdom; however, it can be found on slopes throughout the world. A water misting system lubricates the main and intermediate slopes, which helps increase speed and reduce friction.

The ski club has a clubhouse located beside the slopes, which houses an office and equipment dispensing area. Rental equipment is included in the price of class tickets or practice passes.

== Ski school ==
The club offers ski lessons for all abilities. Instructors in the ski school include IASI-qualified instructors. Most of the instructors' qualifications have been obtained through the Irish Association of Snow sports Instructors (IASI) or the British Association of Snow sports Instructors (BASI). There are, however, a few native Austrian, German, and Spanish skiers among the instructors.

The Ski School runs clinics on Wednesday and Friday nights for more advanced skiers. These clinics focus on high-end skiing and adult race training, including slalom and GS race courses through gates. One-day courses are also run on Saturdays through the ski season.

There is a snowboarding school on Tuesday and Thursday nights, with a Sunday evening jam for boarders only.
