= Ballycorus Leadmines =

Lead mining/smelting centre in County Dublin, Ireland

Ballycorus
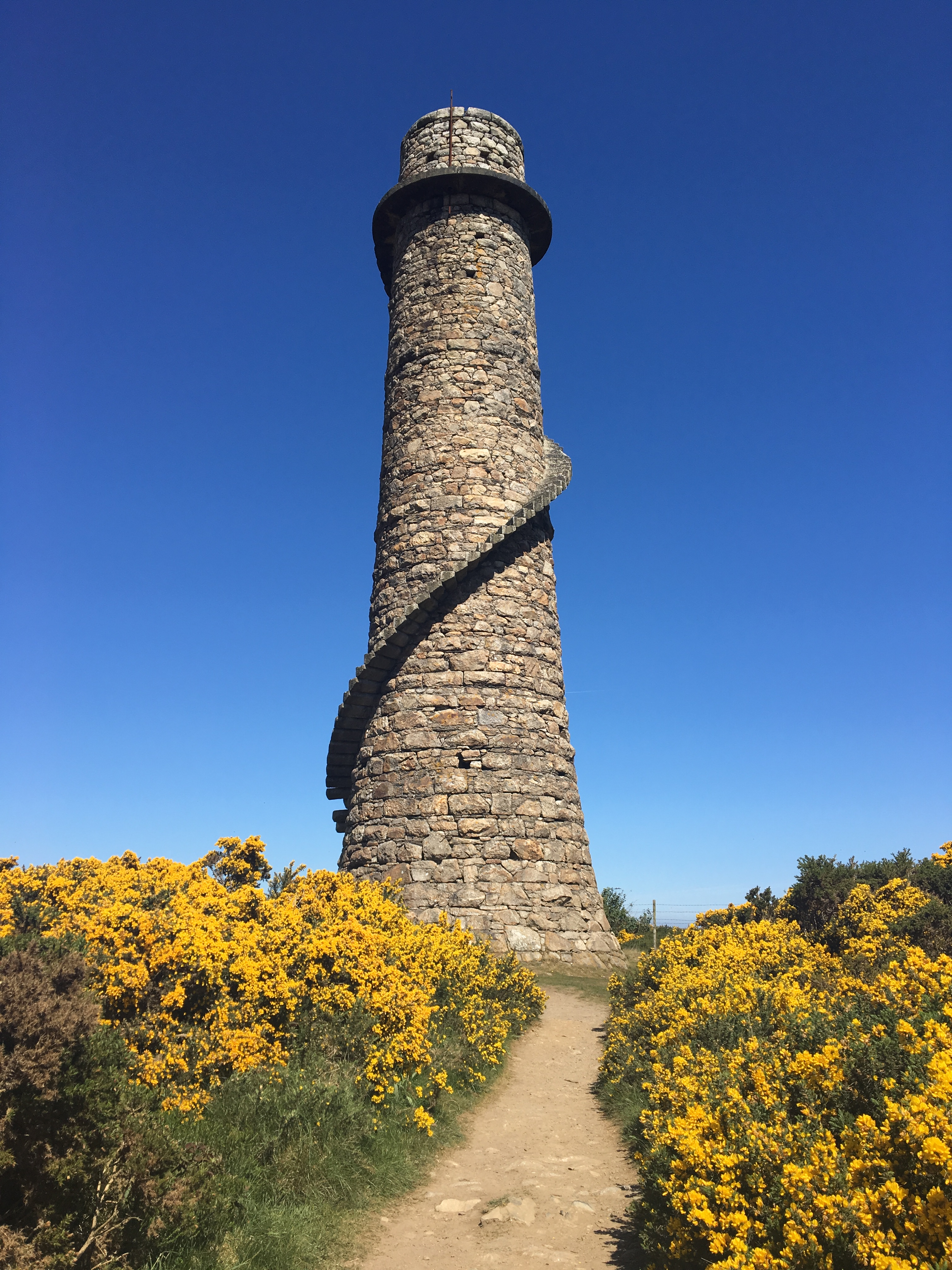
- The ruin of the flue chimney at Ballycorus

- Location in Ireland
- Location: Ballycorus, Dublin, Ireland; 53°13′28″N 006°09′50″W
- Products: Lead; Silver
- Opened: 1807
- Closed: 1913
- Company: Mining Company of Ireland

Ballycorus leadmines is a former lead mining and smelting centre located in the townland of Ballycorus (Irish: Baile Mhic Fheorais, meaning 'town of the Pearse family') near Kilternan in County Dublin, Ireland. The mine opened around 1807 and was taken over by the Mining Company of Ireland (MCI) in 1826 who owned and operated the site up until closure in 1913. After the mine was exhausted in the 1860s, Ballycorus continued to operate as a smelting facility receiving ore from other MCI sites such as the mines in Glendalough, County Wicklow. The most distinctive surviving remnant of the site is the ruin of the flue chimney that lies close to the summit of Carrickgollogan hill. Further down the slopes of the hill, many other former buildings and structures from the leadworks can also be found.

== History ==
Open-cast mining began at Ballycorus around 1807 on the western side of Carrickgollogan hill, close to the later site of the flue chimney. The site was taken over by the Mining Company of Ireland (MCI) in 1826 who undertook underground mining in the area up until 1863. This activity was carried out on an intermittently on the basis of the discontinuous nature of the vein and of the variation in lead prices. A vein of silver was discovered in 1843 but production was limited.

Most of the activity at Ballycorus occurred at the smelting and rolling facility constructed by MCI in the valley below the mine workings. This facility received ore not only from Ballycorus but also from MCI's mine at Luganure, in Glendalough, County Wicklow for processing. The ore from Luganure was carried by horse and cart to the railway station at Rathdrum where it was transferred to a train and brought to Shankill. A siding on the Harcourt Street railway line was built near Shankill station to receive the trains. From Shankill the ore was carted to Ballycorus. Lead ore was also received from MCI mines in counties Donegal and Wexford. By the 1880s it was no longer commercially viable to process Irish ores and the smelter was put to work processing ore from the Great Laxey mine in the Isle of Man up until closure in 1913.

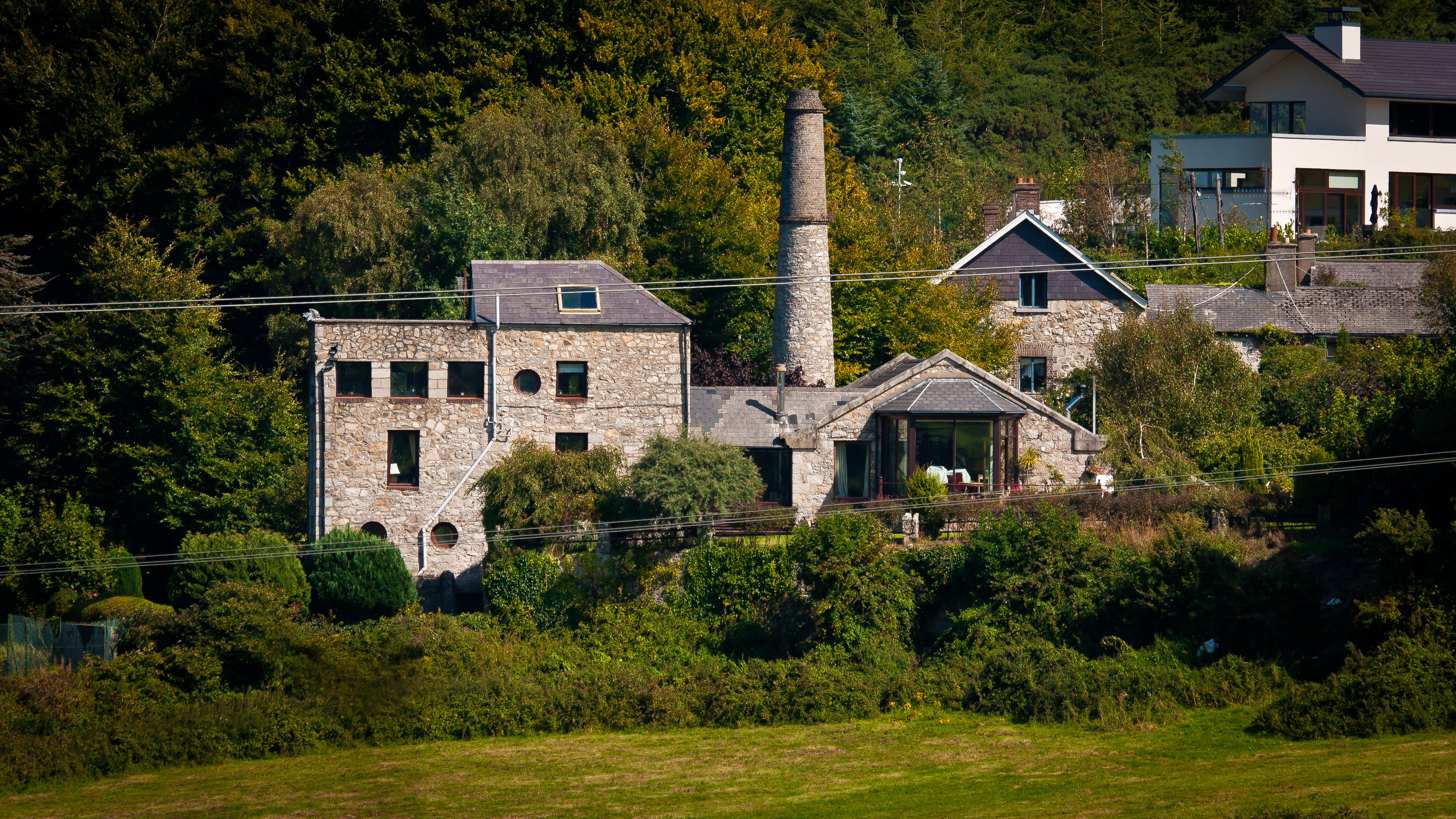
The 1857 shot tower surrounded by some of the surviving buildings from the leadworks

The lead ore was processed using a reverberatory furnace, the bed of which was dished so that the molten lead would trickle down the sides to the centre from which it was run off into moulds. Silver was also extracted during processing by means of a process known as cupellation. The lead, which was used to manufacture pipes and roofing, found a ready market in the Dublin building trade as the city's suburbs began to expand. Lead shot was also manufactured: the first shot tower was built in 1829 and was described by Weston St. John Joyce in The Neighbourhood of Dublin (1912) as “a handsome and substantial structure, having a spiral stairs within, terminating in an artistic iron veranda on the outside”. A second shot tower was built in 1857. A mill stream was used to power much of the machinery in the smelter.

A process had been discovered in the 1770s whereby additional quantities of lead could be extracted from the fumes emitted by reverberatory furnaces if the vapours could be trapped long enough to precipitate the lead. To this end a flue 1 1/4 miles (2 kilometres) long running from the lead works and terminating at a chimney near the summit of Carrickgollogan was constructed in 1836. The precipitated lead deposits were scraped out of the flue by hand and many of the workers subsequently died of lead poisoning, giving the surrounding area the nickname “Death Valley”. The distinctive granite flue chimney with its external spiral staircase and viewing platform quickly became a noted landmark and was marked on Admiralty charts as a point of reference for mariners. Photographic records show that the flue chimney was originally much taller with an extra brick section, now dismantled, rising above the viewing platform. It is the only example of such a flue and chimney to have been built in Ireland. Weston St. John Joyce noted that the flue was “stated to be one of the best constructed in the United Kingdom”.

== Present day ==
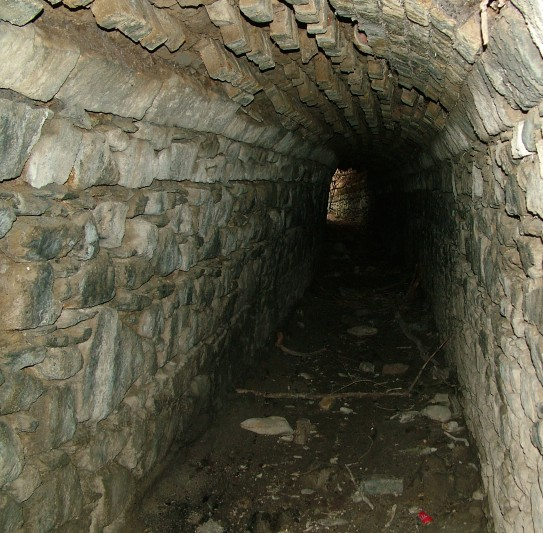
Inside the Flue

The most prominent surviving remnant of the leadworks is that of the flue chimney. The land around the chimney is owned by the State forestry company Coillte and managed by the Dublin Mountains Partnership. A waymarked walking trail around the forest, called “The Lead Mines Way”, leads to the ruin of the chimney. The top third of the chimney has been removed as it was deemed unsafe as has the lower section of the external stairs. Much of the flue, along with many of its inspection hatches still exists and can be explored. In addition, a number of buildings from the smelting works situated in the valley below also survive to the present day. These industrial buildings, all built from granite, include furnaces, purification tanks, lime kilns, stores, workers' cottages and the manager's house. Many of these buildings are now private residences while the smelter site itself is now a solvent factory. The 1857 shot tower is also extant. However, the 1829 shot tower admired by Joyce no longer survives. The former mill pond is now part of a concrete plant.

A joint investigation in 2009 by the Environmental Protection Agency and the Geological Survey of Ireland into the potential risk posed by historic mines sites in Ireland into human and animal health found high concentrations of lead waste at Ballycorus. The report graded the site as Class IV: a site “requiring specific monitoring on particular waste piles, discharges or stream sediments on a five-yearly basis”.
