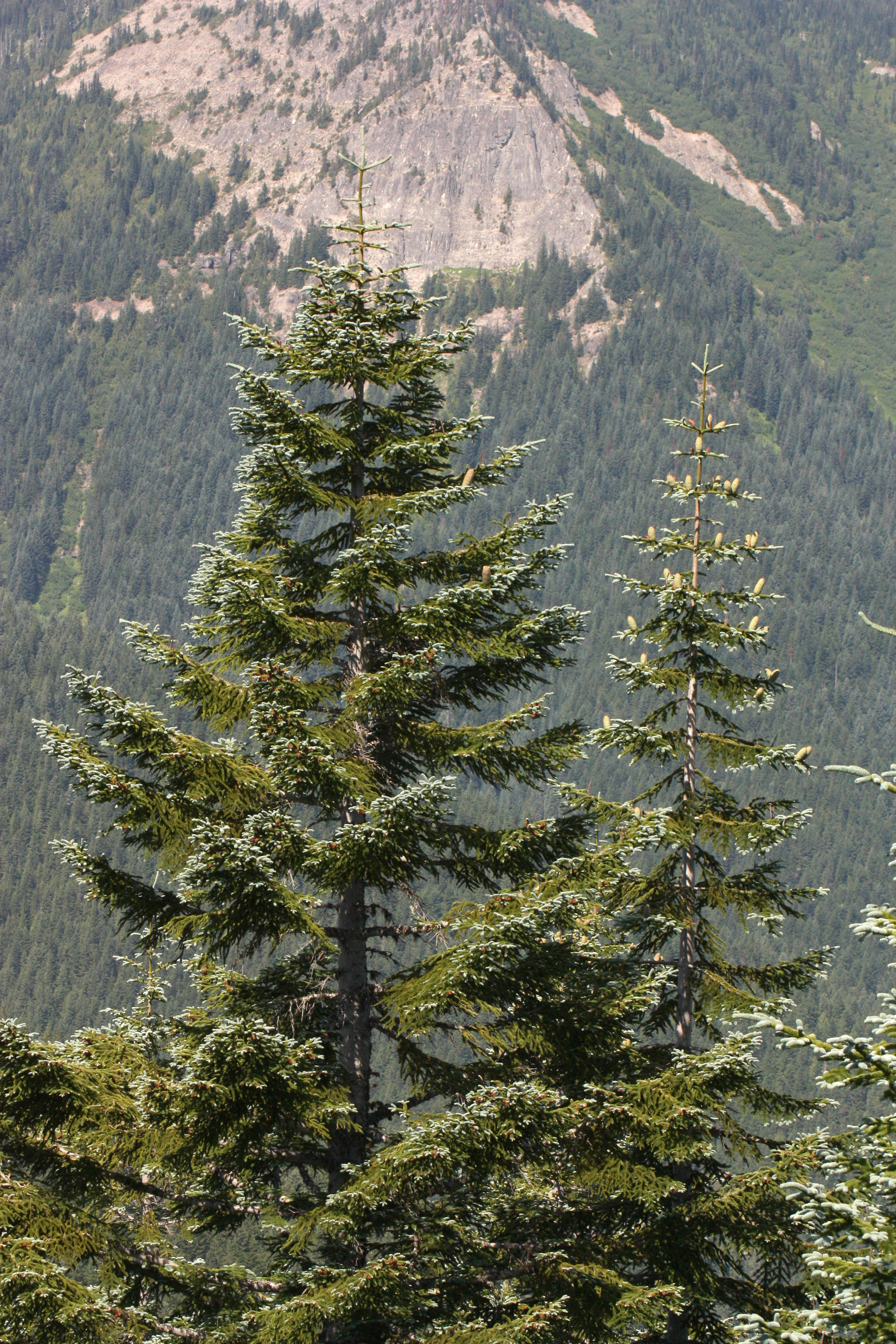
- Noble firs in Gifford Pinchot National Forest, Washington

Conservation status
- Least Concern (IUCN 3.1)

Scientific classification
- Kingdom: Plantae
- Clade: Tracheophytes
- Clade: Gymnosperms
- Division: Pinophyta
- Class: Pinopsida
- Order: Pinales
- Family: Pinaceae
- Genus: Abies
- Species: A. procera

Binomial name
- Abies procera Rehder
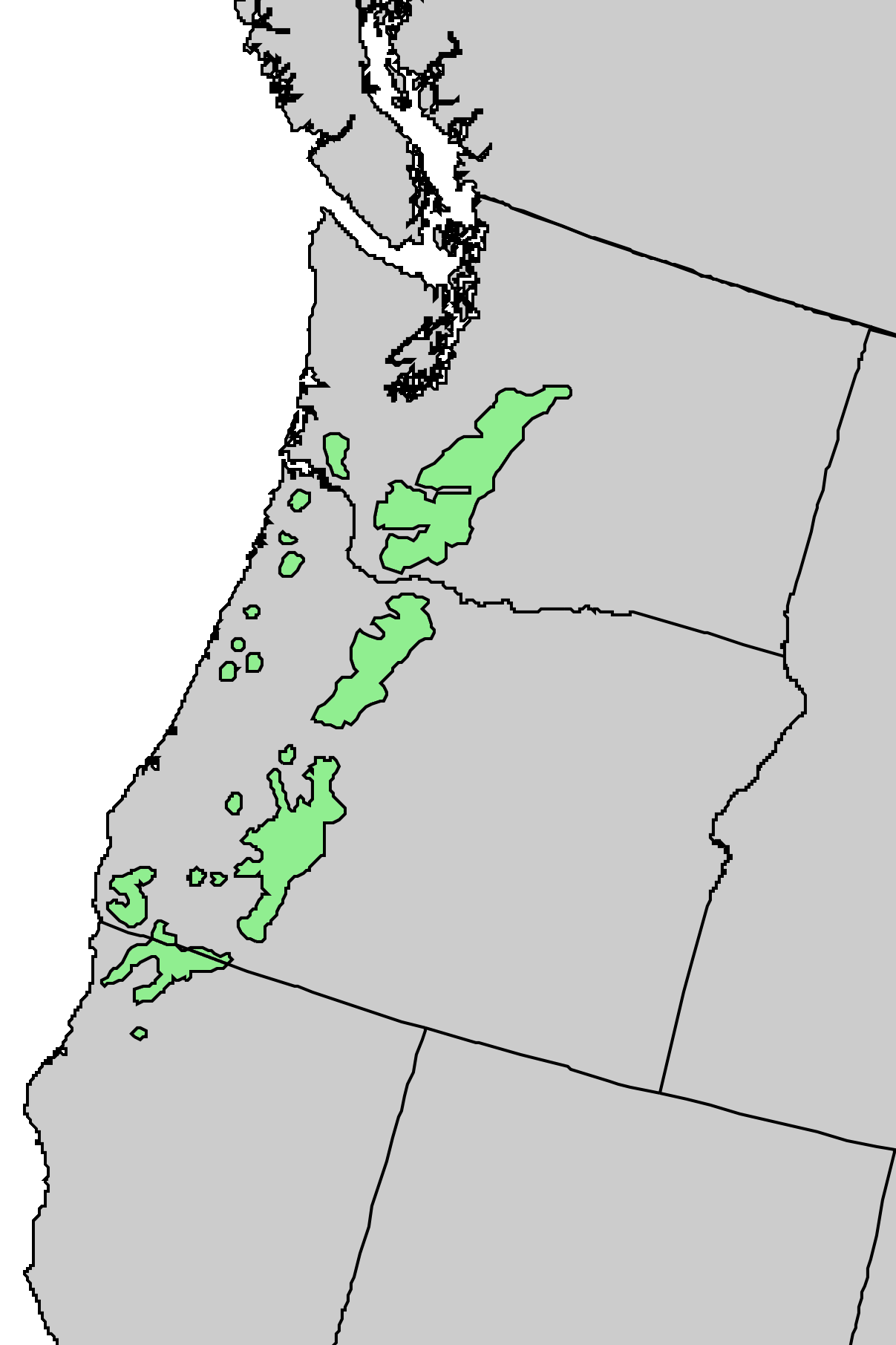
- Natural range

Synonyms
- Pinus nobilis Douglas ex D.Don; Abies nobilis (Douglas ex D.Don) Lindl., nom. illeg.; Picea nobilis (Douglas ex D.Don) Loudon; Pseudotsuga nobilis (Douglas ex D.Don) W.R.McNab

= Abies procera =

Species of conifer

Abies procera, the noble fir, also called red fir, is a species of fir native to the Cascade Range and Pacific Coast Ranges of the northwestern Pacific Coast of the United States. It occurs at altitudes of 300–1,500 meters (980–4,920 ft).

== Description ==
A. procera is a large evergreen conifer with a narrow conic crown, growing up to 70 meters (230 ft) tall and 2 m (6 ft 7 in) in trunk diameter, rarely to 90 m (295 ft) tall and 2.7 m (8 ft 10 in) thick. The bark on young trees is smooth and gray with resin blisters, becoming red-brown, rough and fissured on old trees, usually less than 5 centimeters (2 in) thick; the inner bark is reddish. The leaves are needle-like, 1–3.5 cm (1/2–1 1/2 in) long, glaucous blue-green above and below with strong stomal bands, and a blunt to notched tip. They are arranged spirally on the shoot, but twisted slightly S-shaped to be upcurved above the shoot. The cones are upright, 11–22 cm (4 1/4–8 3/4 in) long and 6 cm (2 1/4 in) thick, with the purple scales almost completely hidden by the long exserted yellow-green bract scales; they ripen brown and disintegrate to release the winged seeds in fall. Viable seeds are only produced every few years.

The species can grow for up to 200 years, and is the world's tallest true fir.

== Taxonomy ==
David Douglas discovered the species in the Cascade Range in the early 19th century, calling it "noble fir" and naming it Pinus nobilis. This name however could not be used in the genus Abies, as the same name had already been used several years earlier by Albert Dietrich for a different species (Abies alba); thus, Alfred Rehder gave it the new name Abies procera in 1940. His chosen specific epithet procera means "tall".

== Distribution ==
The species is native to the Cascade Range and Pacific Coast Ranges of western Washington and Oregon, as well as the extreme northwest of California. It is a high-altitude tree, typically occurring at altitudes of 300–1,500 m (980–4,920 ft), often above 600 m (2,000 ft), and only rarely reaching the tree line.

== Ecology ==
The species is closely related to Abies magnifica (red fir), which replaces it further southeast in southernmost Oregon and California, being best distinguished by the leaves having a groove along the midrib on the upper side; red fir does not show this. Red fir also tends to have the leaves less closely packed, with the shoot bark visible between the leaves, whereas the shoot is largely hidden in noble fir. Red fir cones also mostly have shorter bracts, except in A. magnifica var. shastensis (Shasta red fir); this variety hybridizes with noble fir and is itself a hybrid between noble fir and red fir. As opposed to Shasta red fir, noble fir is shade-intolerant, leaving its lower trunk branchless.

Noble fir occurs with Douglas-fir and western hemlock at middle elevations, and with Pacific silver fir and mountain hemlock at higher elevations. It occurs in cool, humid areas similar to those occupied by Pacific silver fir. While it benefits from occasional disturbances (e.g. the 1980 eruption of Mount St. Helens), it is very susceptible to fire but is usually protected by its moist environment. It is relatively resistant to damage from wind, insects or diseases. Although the roots grow slowly, it can survive in rocky soil as long as it is moist.

== Cultivation and uses ==
The Paiute used the foliage to treat coughs and colds.

The superior light and strong wood was recognized early by loggers, who called it "larch" to avoid conflating it with inferior firs. The wood is used for specialized applications such as ladders, general structural purposes and paper manufacture. It may have been used for the frames of the Royal Air Force's Mosquito bombers during World War II.

David Douglas sent noble fir seeds to Britain in 1830, introducing it to horticulturalists. It is a popular and favored Christmas tree. The prostrate gray cultivar A. procera (Glauca Group) 'Glauca Prostrata' has gained the Royal Horticultural Society's Award of Garden Merit.

Noble fir has become naturalized in Britain (particularly in Scotland) and Denmark.

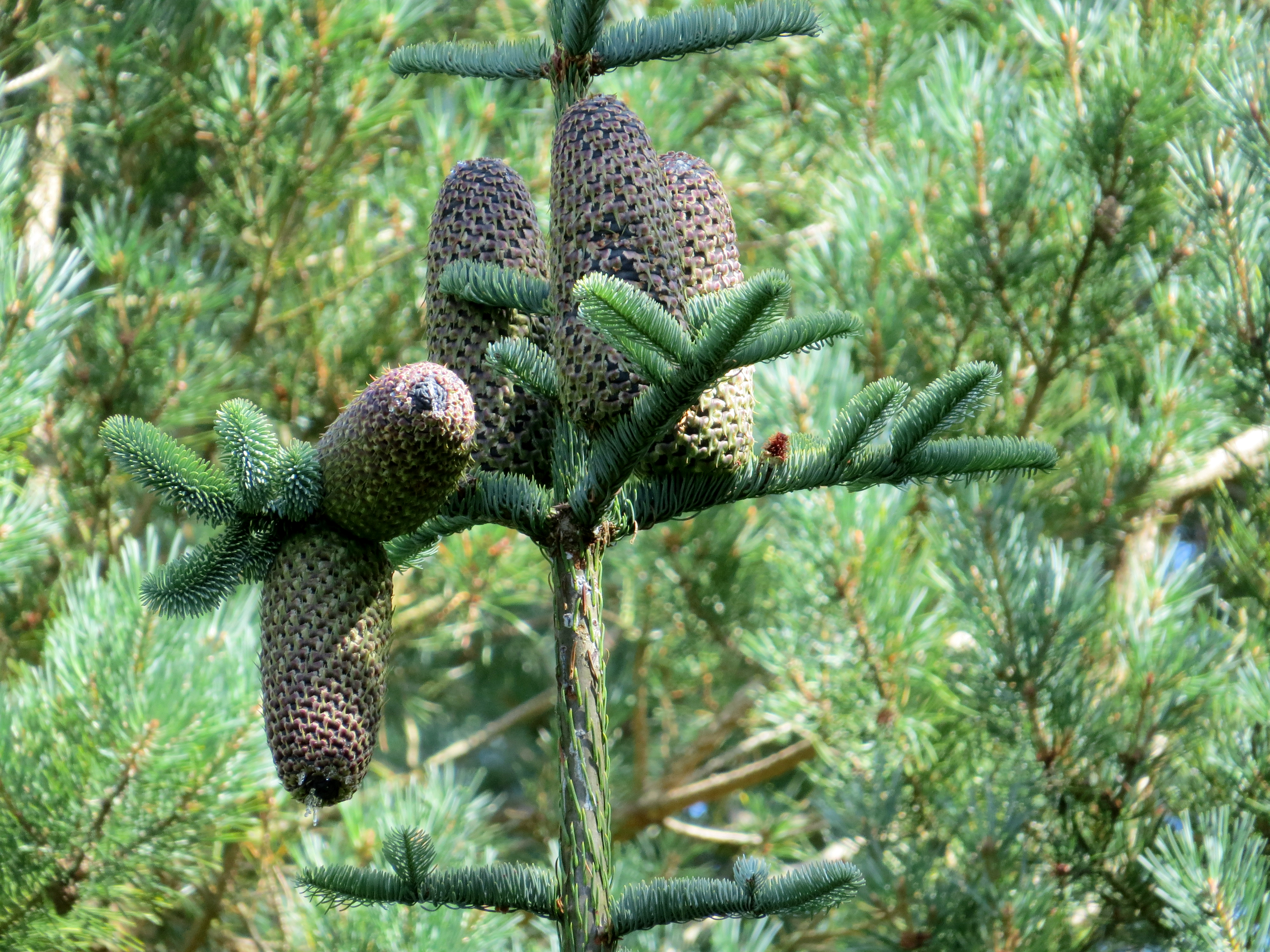
The large cones are heavy enough that the branch bearing them can twist under their weight

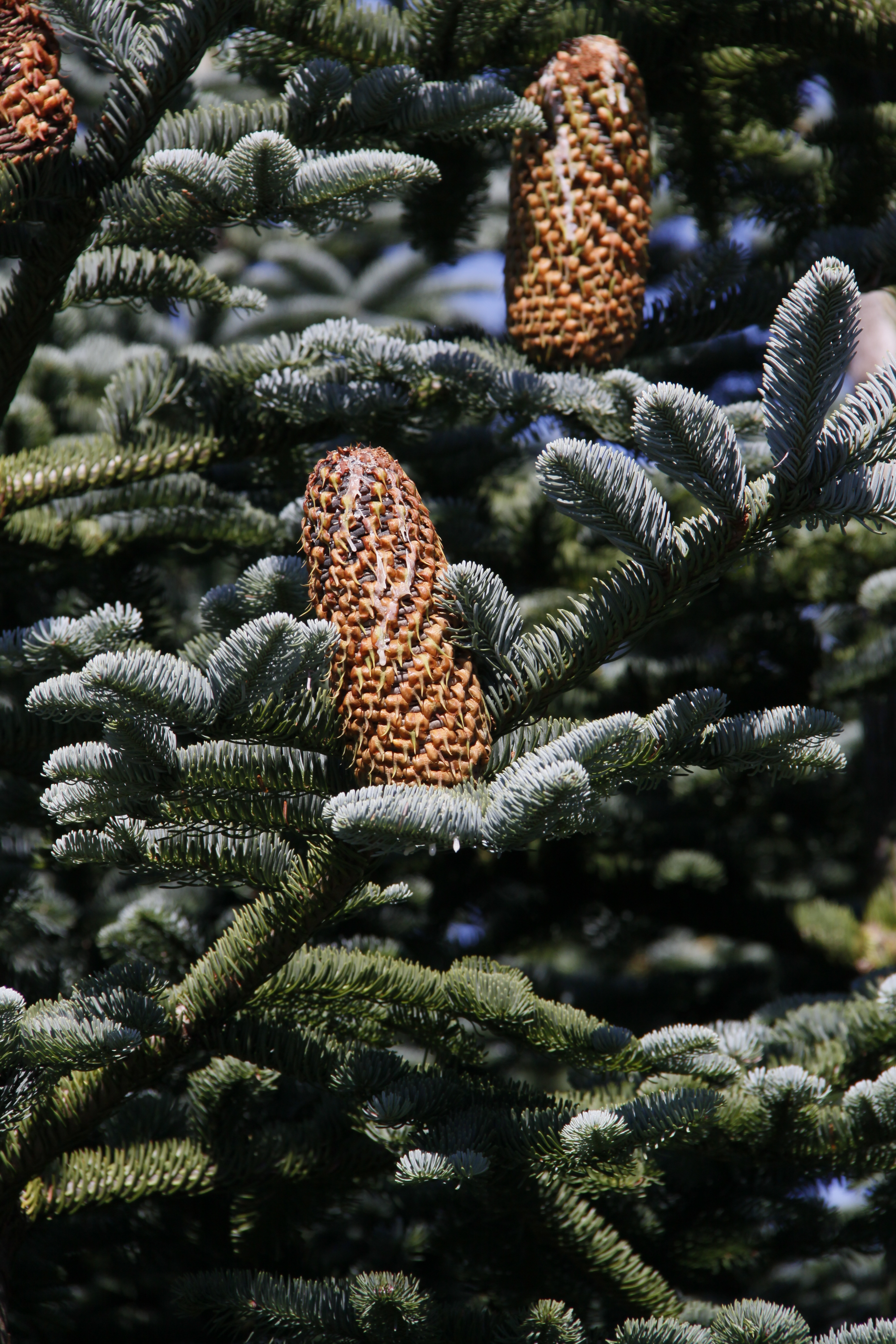
Cones

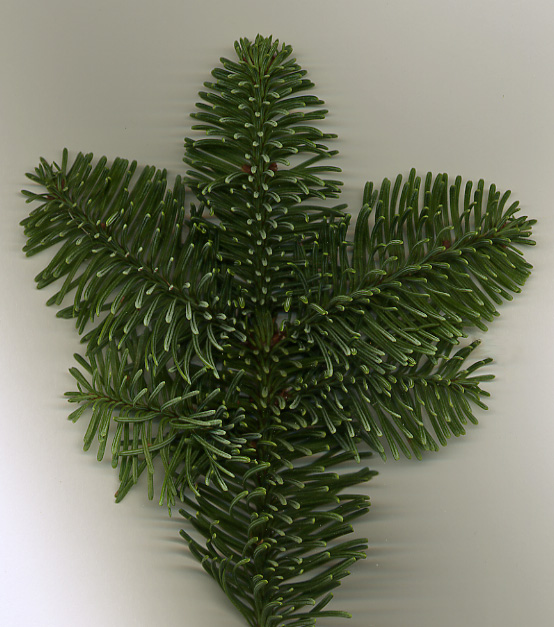
Foliage
