= Two Rock =

Mountain in County Dublin, Ireland

Two Rock Mountain
- Black Mountain
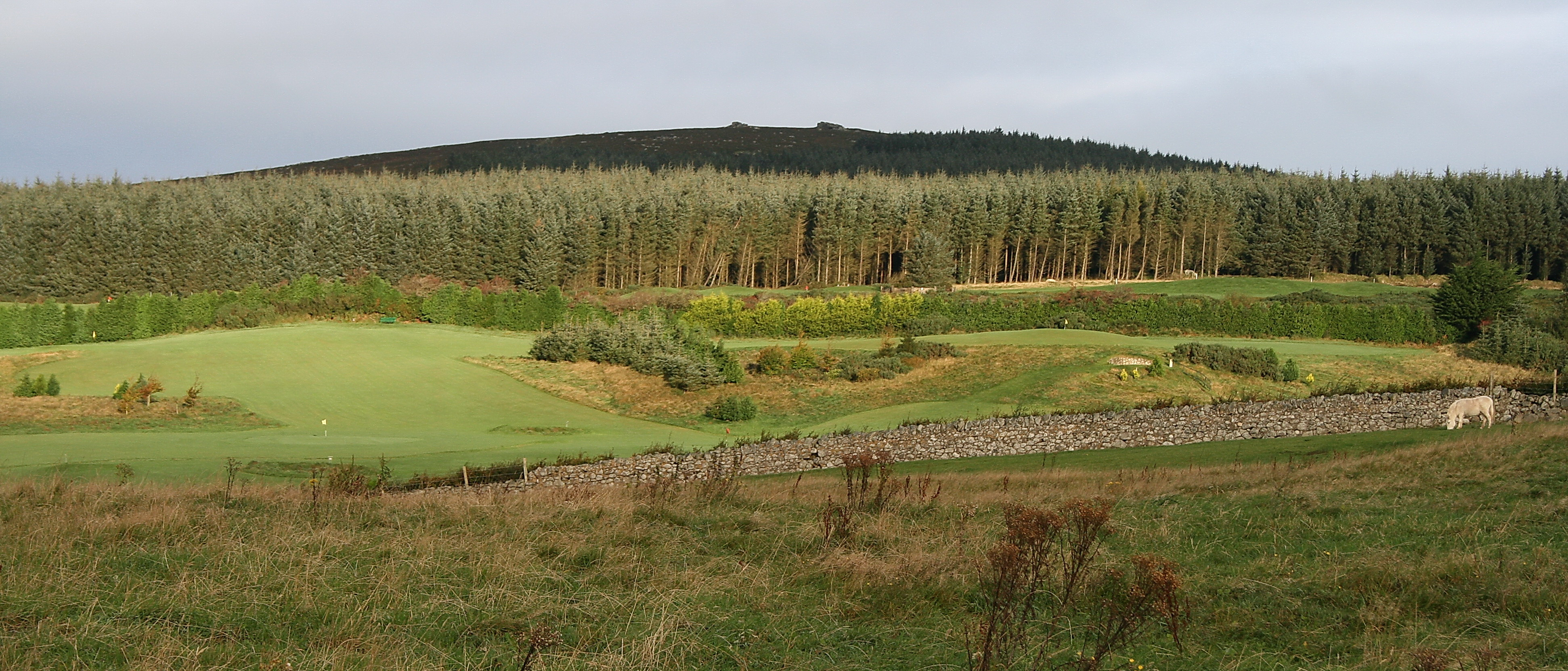
- Two Rock Mountain from the south

Highest point
- Elevation: 536 m (1,759 ft)
- Prominence: 171 m (561 ft)
- Listing: Marilyn (hill)
- Coordinates: 53°14′10″N 6°14′30″W

Naming
- Native name: Binn Dá Charraig; Sliab Lecga

Geography
- Location within Dublin Location within island of Ireland
- Location: Dún Laoghaire–Rathdown, Ireland
- Parent range: Dublin Mountains
- OSI/OSNI grid: O1721922374
- Topo map: OSi Discovery Series No. 50

Two Rock (archaic: Black Mountain; Irish: Binn Dá Charraig, meaning 'Two Rock Mountain' or Sliab Lecga, 'Mountain of Flagstones') is a mountain in Dún Laoghaire–Rathdown, Ireland. It is 536 metres (1,759 feet) high and is the 382nd highest mountain in Ireland. It is the highest point of the group of hills in the Dublin Mountains which comprises Two Rock, Three Rock, Kilmashogue and Tibradden Mountains. The mountain takes its name from the two granite tors that lie to the south-east of the summit. From the summit, which is called Fairy Castle, there are views of much of the Dublin area from Tallaght to Howth to the north while Bray Head, Killiney Hill, the Great Sugar Loaf and the Wicklow Mountains are visible to the south. The summit area is mostly shallow bog while ferns and gorse cover the lower slopes. The mountain is also an important habitat for red grouse.

A number of prehistoric monuments can be found on the mountain including a passage tomb on the summit and a wedge tomb on the slopes near Ballyedmonduff.

== Points of interest ==
=== Fairy Castle ===
Fairy Castle, as the summit is known, is marked by a stone cairn and an Ordnance Survey trig pillar. These both sit on top of a circular structure of granite and quartz blocks 25 metres (82 feet) across and 2 metres (6.6 feet) high and covered by turf and vegetation. This is the remains of a passage tomb, the easternmost of a series of such tombs that stretches across the Dublin and West Wicklow Mountains. The entrance to the tomb – once described by locals as a "cave" – can no longer be seen due to the collapse of the edges of the cairn. There is no evidence that the tomb has ever been opened but archaeologists believe that the interior contains a small burial chamber.

=== Ballyedmonduff wedge tomb ===
In an area of forest to the southeast of the summit, near Ballyedmonduff, at grid reference O 185 213, there is a Bronze Age wedge tomb, known as the "Giant's Grave". It is considered one of the finest examples of a wedge tomb in Ireland: the antiquarian John O'Donovan said of it, "I doubt I have met so perfect a pagan grave in any other counties hitherto examined". Its appearance has changed since the time of its first discovery: sketches made in the 1830s by the Ordnance Survey show a grass-covered tumulus. A drawing by George Du Noyer indicates that the roof was partially intact at that time. In addition, the pine forest that now surrounds the site obscures the views of the Great Sugar Loaf mountain and the twin tors of Two Rock that would have been possible from this location in the past. The tomb was first opened in 1832 by Alderman Blacker of St Andrew Street, Dublin but no record of this excavation survives. However, when John O'Donovan visited on behalf of the Ordnance Survey, the locals told him that ashes had been found when the grave was opened. After the tomb was opened, many of the larger stones were removed by local stonecutters. The site was excavated again in 1945 by Seán P. Ó Riordáin and Rúaidhri de Valera who found sherds of decorated Beaker pottery, a polished hammer, a possible polishing stone and a flint scraper. A small amount of cremated human bone was also found. Following the excavation the monument was rebuilt in the form it appears in today. The tomb consists of a burial gallery over 6 metres (20 feet) long divided into three chambers surrounded by a horseshoe-shaped arrangement of stones with a straight façade at the western end. At the southern end is a long stone with seven cupmarks on one surface. This form of rock art is usually associated with earlier Neolithic culture and is generally found on natural rock outcrops. The stone may have come from a natural boulder brought to the site during construction.

=== Other points of interest ===
There was once another megalithic tomb – known as The Greyhound's Bed – on the southern slopes of Two Rock near the R116 road between the villages of Glencullen and Brockey. This was described in 1836 by the antiquarian Eugene O'Curry as a long stone 10 feet (3.0 metres) long by 7 feet (2.1 metres) wide. A sketch was made by the Royal Society of Antiquaries of Ireland in 1855 before the monument was destroyed.

There is also a triangular-shaped standing stone, 1 metre (3.3 feet) high approximately 400 metres (1,300 feet), north-northeast of Fairy Castle on the slope leading to Three Rock.

== Access and recreation ==
Two Rock can be reached via the Coillte-owned forest recreation areas of Ticknock, Kilmashogue and Tibradden, which are managed by the Dublin Mountains Partnership. The mountain is traversed by the Dublin Mountains Way hiking trail that runs between Shankill and Tallaght while the Wicklow Way hiking trail runs to the west of the summit.

== Images ==
Two Rock Mountain
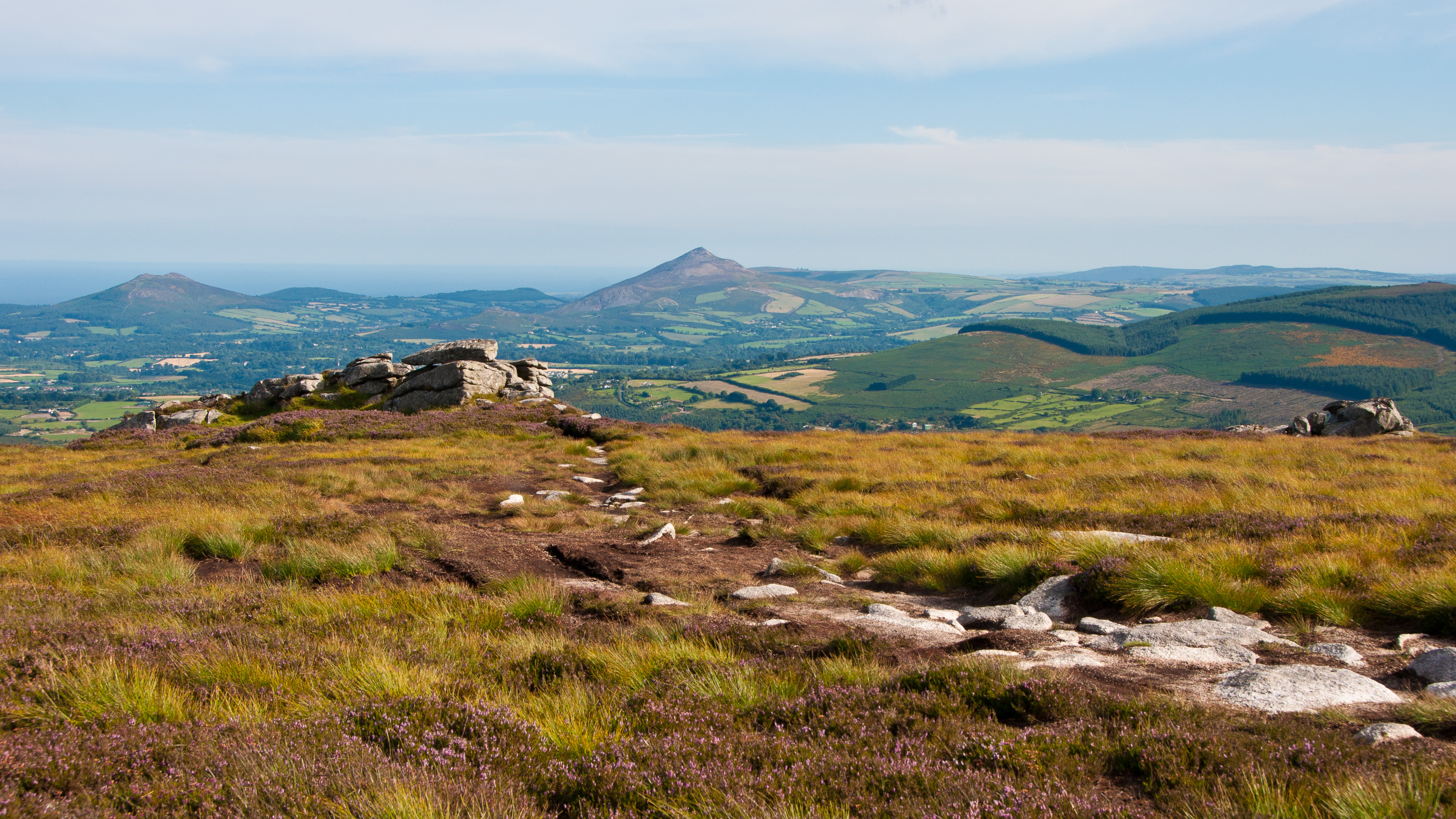
The two tors that give Two Rock its name

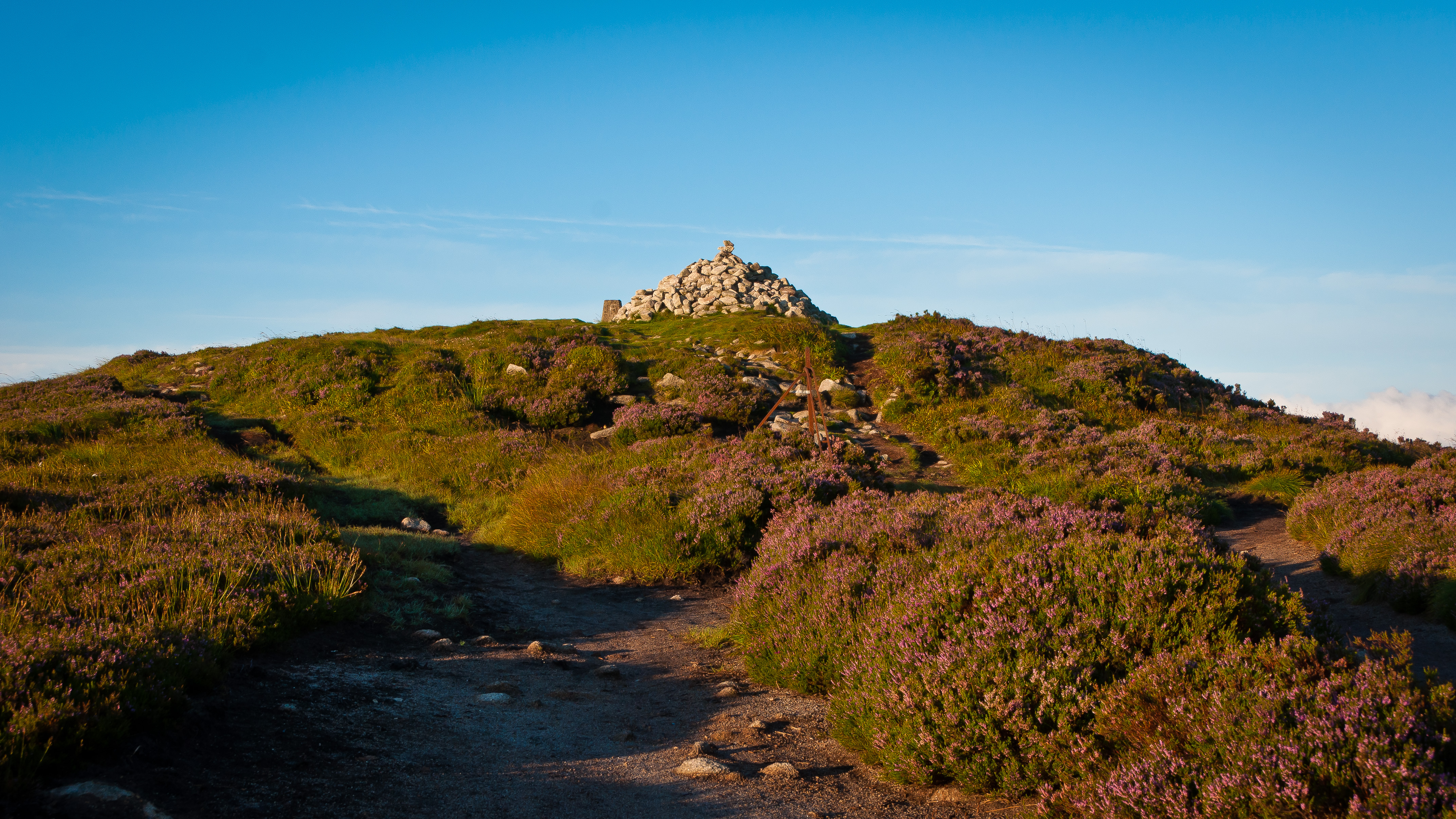
Fairy Castle: the mound on which the cairn and trig pillar sit is a passage grave

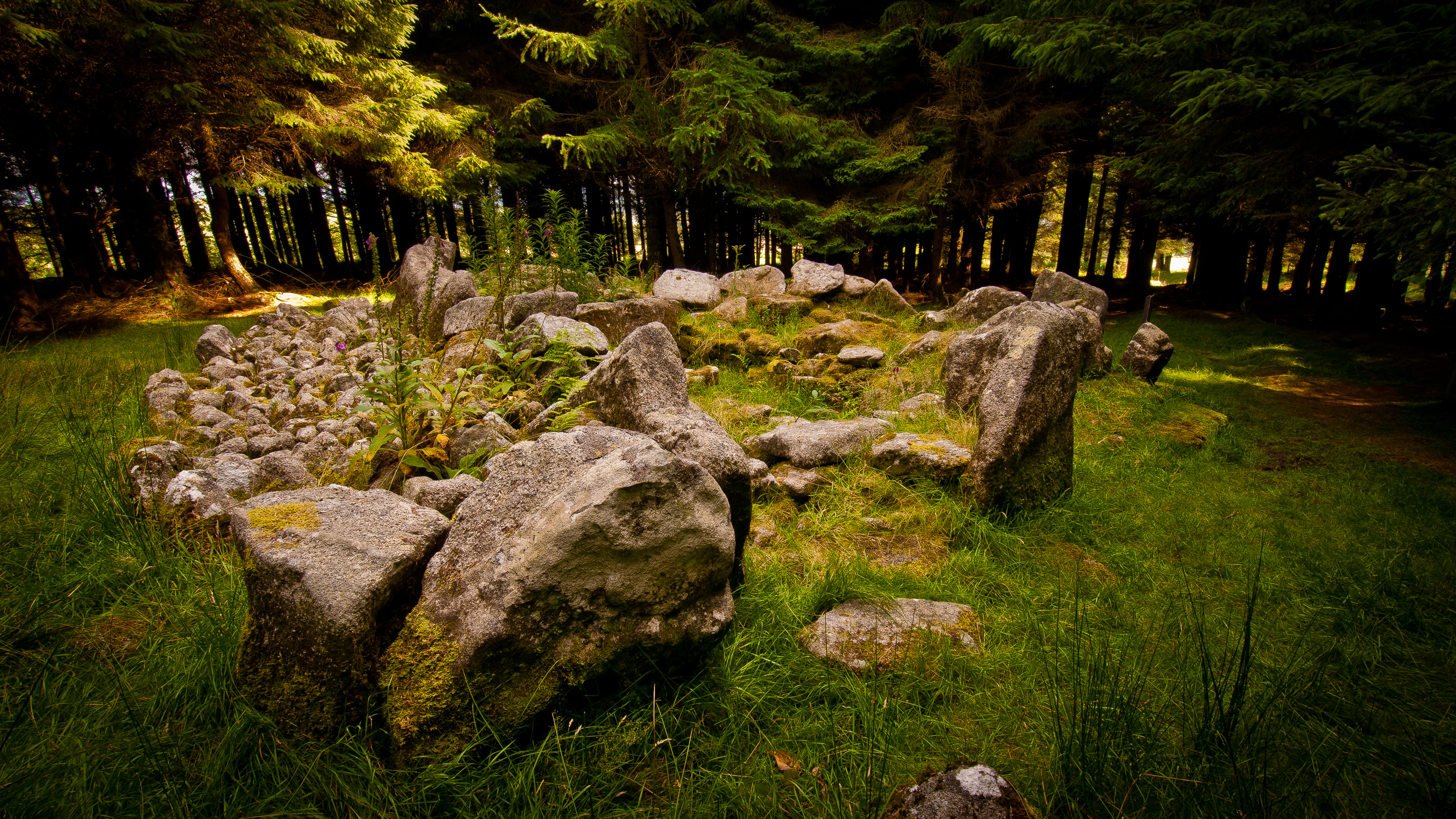
Ballyedmonduff wedge tomb

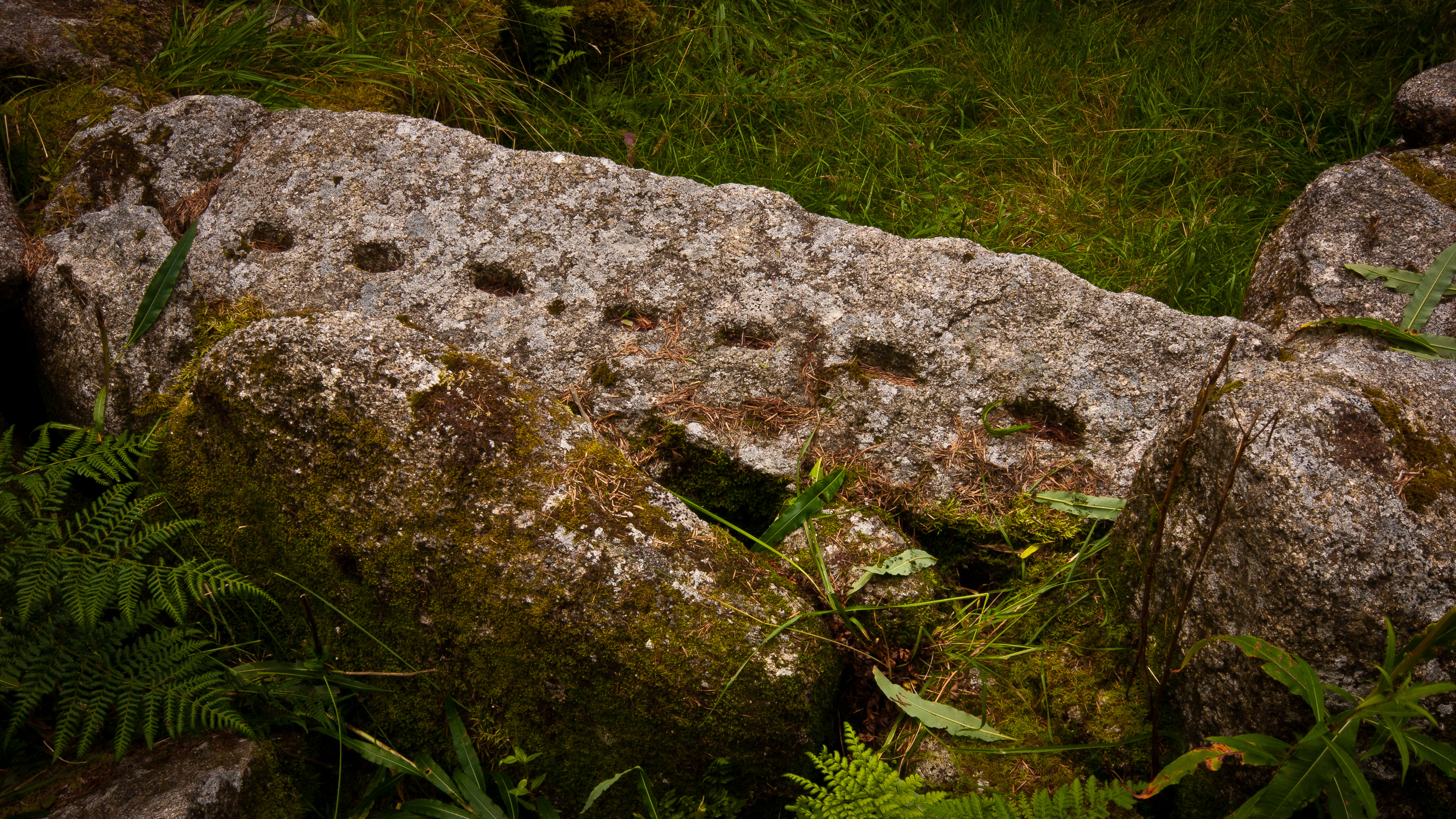
Rock art at Ballyedmonduff wedge tomb

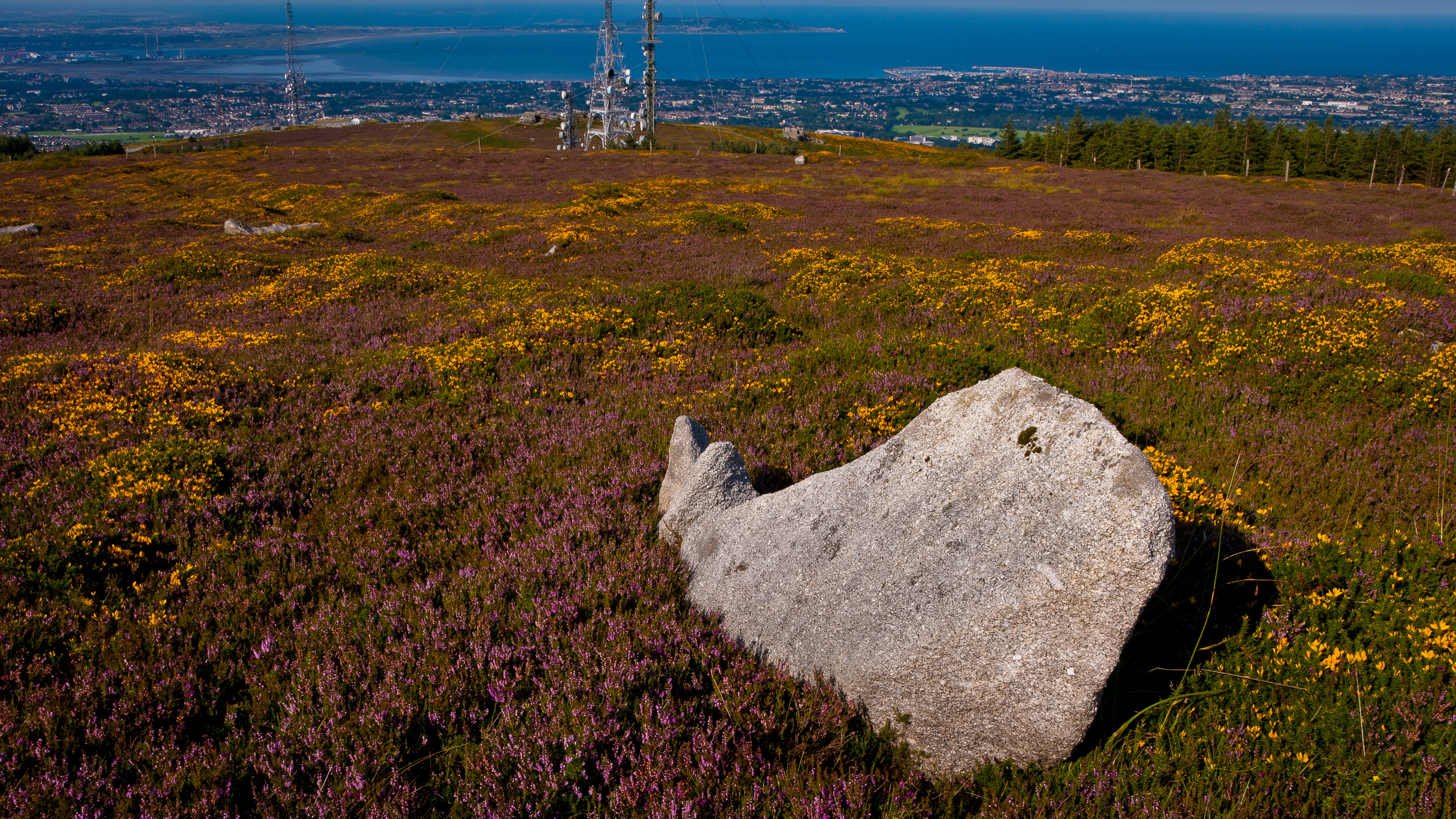
Standing stone on the north-northeast slopes
