= John Moloney =

John Moloney may refer to:

- John Moloney (Irish politician) (born 1953), Irish Fianna Fáil politician
- John Moloney (Australian politician) (1885–1942), Western Australian state MP
- John Moloney (rugby union) (born 1949), Irish international rugby union player
- John Moloney (comedian), British comedian
- John Moloney (businessman) (born 1954), Irish businessman
- John Moloney (Australian footballer) (1881–1948), Australian rules footballer
- John Moloney (referee) (1935–2006), Irish Gaelic football and hurling referee
- John Moloney (musician)

== See also ==
- John Maloney (disambiguation)
- John Molony (1927–2018), Australian historian
