= Three Rock Mountain =

Mountain in County Dublin, Ireland

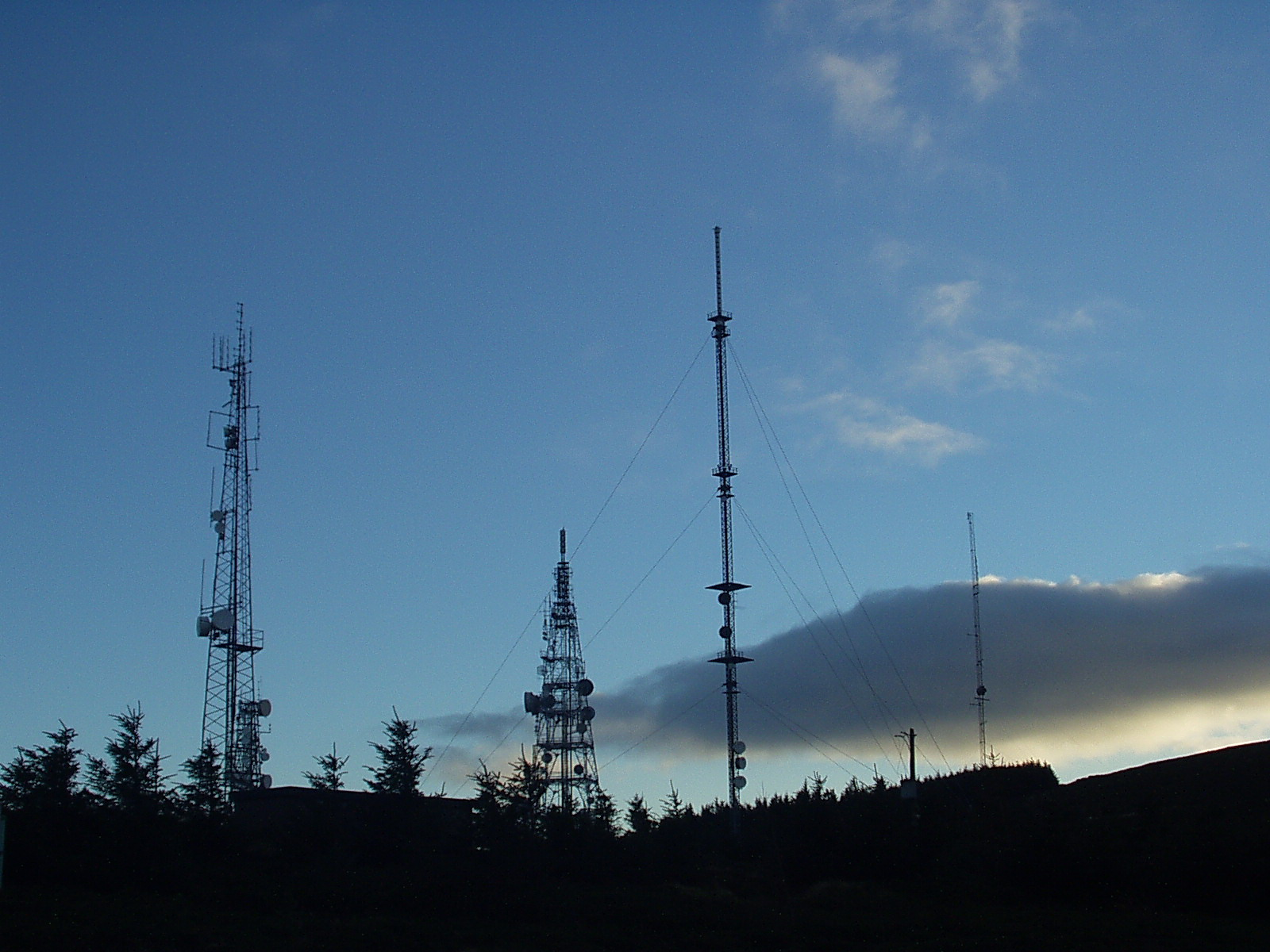
- Masts on Three Rock Mountain

Highest point
- Elevation: 448 m (1,470 ft)
- Coordinates: 53°14′43″N 6°14′21″W

Naming
- Native name: Binn Trí Charraig / Sliabh Ruadh

Geography
- Location within Dublin Location within island of Ireland
- Location: Dún Laoghaire–Rathdown, Ireland
- Parent range: Dublin Mountains
- OSI/OSNI grid: O176231
- Topo map: OSI Discovery No. 50

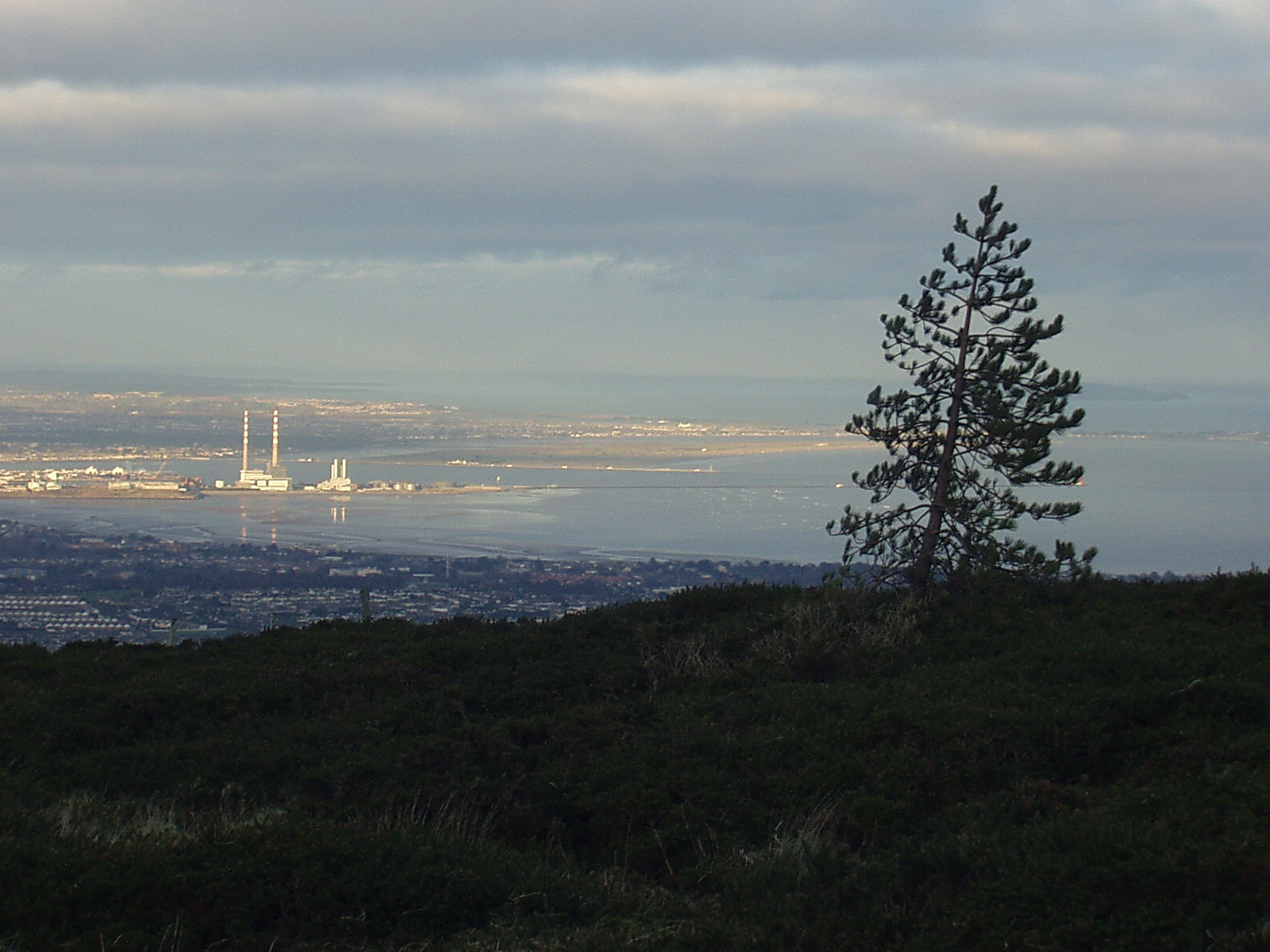
Dublin Bay from Three Rock Mountain

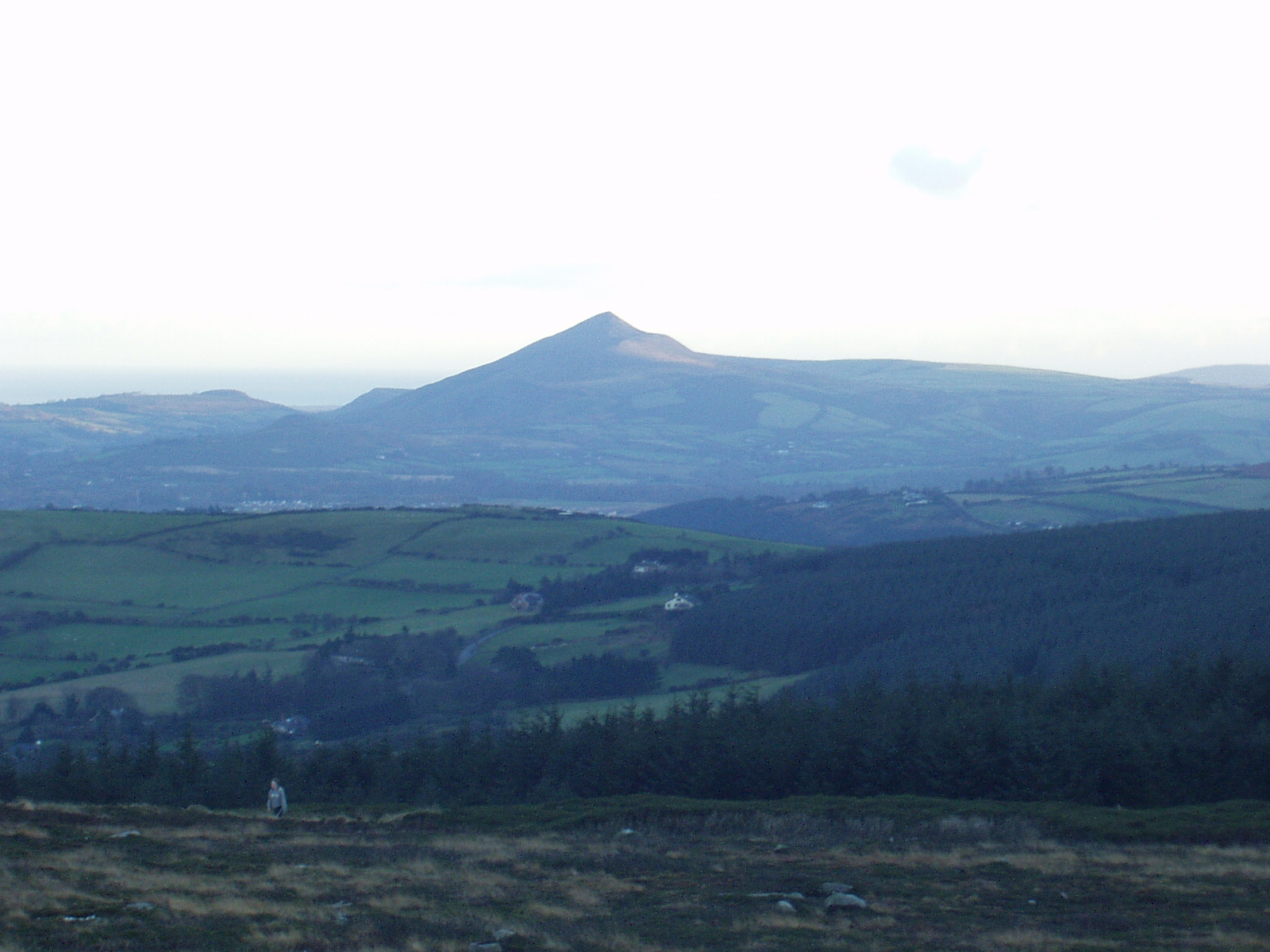
The Great Sugar Loaf from the summit of Three Rock Mountain

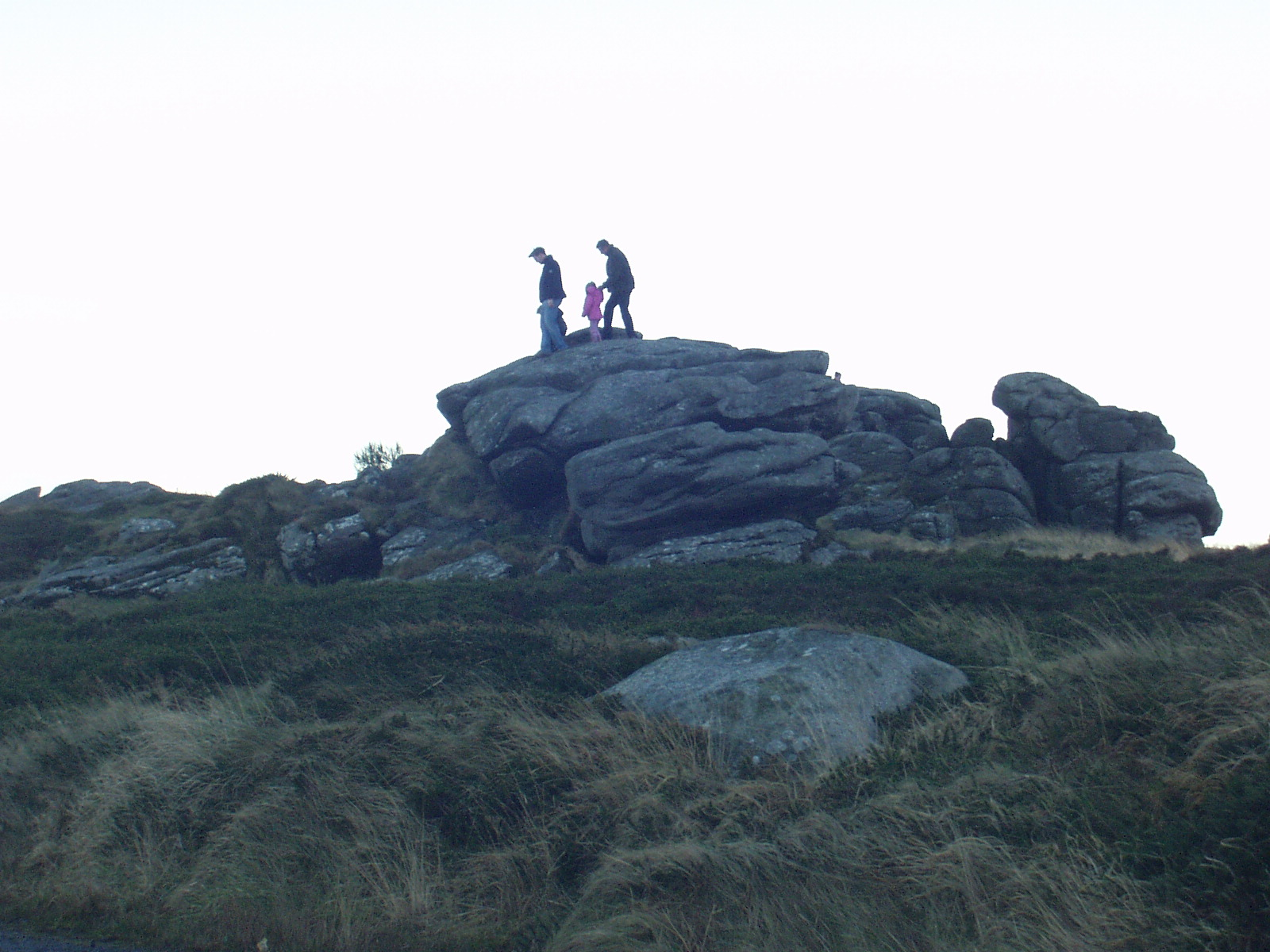
On top of the big rock

Three Rock Mountain (Irish: Binn Trí Charraig; archaic: Sliabh Ruadh) is a mountain in County Dublin, Ireland. It is 444 metres (1,457 feet) high and forms part of the group of hills in the Dublin Mountains which comprises Two Rock, Three Rock, Kilmashogue and Tibradden mountains.

The mountain takes its name from the three groups of granite rocks at the summit. It was once believed that these features were man-made: for instance, Gabriel Beranger wrote of them in 1780, "I take them to be altars upon which sacrifices were offered […] the regularity which is observed in piling them convinces me they are the work of man, as they could not grow in that position". In fact, the three outcrops are tors: natural geological features produced by the gradual process of weathering.

Today, the summit is dominated by the many radio masts and towers that use the site to broadcast their signals across the Dublin area below. The forestry plantations on the slopes consist mainly of Sitka spruce, Japanese larch, Scots pine, Monterey pine and lodgepole pine.

== Access and recreation ==
The views from the summit are extensive and have attracted visitors for many years. The writer Weston St. John Joyce described the vista thus: "The view from this commanding height, 1,479 feet over sea-level, extends over a vast tract of mountain, sea, and plain, comprising, to the north, the blue waters of Dublin Bay, with Clontarf and Howth, the Naul or Man-of-War hills, and the Mourne Mountains; eastward, Kingstown, Dalkey, and Killiney, and then in succession the fertile vale of Shanganagh, Carrickgollogan, the Scalp, Bray Head, the Sugar Loaves, and the slopes of Prince William's Seat. In clear weather Holyhead and the Welsh mountains may frequently be discerned, Snowdon and the Llanberis Pass being usually the most conspicuous, but occasionally the elongated outline of Cader Idris may be observed some distance to the right". By way of contrast, Gabriel Beranger said of Three Rock, "The extensive summit of this mountain, the parched ground and its solitude, make it the most awful spot I had ever seen".

Access to the mountain is possible via the Coillte-owned forest recreation areas of Ticknock and Kilmashogue. The route via Kilmashogue follows the Wicklow Way hiking trail for part of the way. Three Rock is also traversed by the Dublin Mountains Way hiking trail that runs between Shankill and Tallaght. In 2007 a concept was submitted to Dún Laoghaire–Rathdown County Council to create a cableway from the Sandyford Luas stop to Three Rock Mountain and to open up the views to touristic and easier access.

Several local sports clubs take their name from the mountain such as the Three Rock Orienteering Club has mapped the area and run orienteering competitions there since 1981 as well as Three Rock Rovers Hockey Club (field hockey) and Three Rock Rovers association football club.

== History ==
On the top of the central tor at the summit are four bowl-shaped depressions: these are bullauns which were used in early Christian times for grinding. At one time, to the east of central tor was the remains of an abandoned public house.

Close to the summit is the ruins of an old army shooting range which closed in the 1970s. The targets were raised and lowered by 12 men using levers in a concrete dugout. A red flag was raised along the forest road to alert visitors that firing exercises were in progress.

The remains of several hill forts, ring forts and other enclosures are to be found on the slopes of the mountain though they have largely disappeared under the forestry plantations.

During the nineteenth century, much of the lower slopes of Three Rock were covered with small quarries, especially around the village of Barnacullia, which supplied paving stones for Dublin Corporation for many years. Close to Barnacullia was a cottage that was occupied for many years by the Countess Markievicz up until the 1916 Easter Rising. The children of James Connolly stayed at the cottage during the week of the Rising. During the Irish War of Independence (1919–21) the 6th Battalion of the Dublin Brigade established a camp at Barnacullia.

Further down the slopes, near the Ticknock Road, is a holy well, known as Grumley's Well, reputed to cure eye ailments.

== Transmission site ==
The main transmission site on Three Rock is owned and operated by 2RN a subsidiary of the Irish national broadcaster RTÉ, its 140-metre (460 ft) cable-stayed mast is close to the peak, which is 448 metres (1,470 ft) above Ordnance Datum.

This site, and Cairn Hill in County Longford, were the first UHF television transmitters built by RTÉ to facilitate the introduction of their second television channel (RTÉ 2) in 1978. Both transmitters also helped improve television reception in their respective service areas. Since 1961 Dublin city had been served by the Kippure VHF television transmitter in County Wicklow which did not cover some Eastern and Southern parts of the city very satisfactorily. A low-power VHF TV relay transmitter (now defunct) had broadcast from the links tower at the RTÉ campus in Donnybrook to serve most of the districts not reached by Kippure. The original transmission tower on the site was superseded by the present 140m mast in 2002, but the tower remains as a microwave link facility carrying service feeds for broadcast and telecoms.

Today the Three Rock transmitters provide the Irish digital television service, Saorview, to Dublin city and county, as well as FM and DAB radio networks. Other masts at the site carry the majority of Dublin's local radio stations.

== Current transmissions ==
=== Digital television ===
Frequency	UHF	kW	Multiplex	Pol
546 MHz	30	125	Saorview 1	H
570 MHz	33	125	Saorview 2	H

=== FM radio ===
Frequency	kW	Service
88.5 MHz	5	RTÉ Radio 1
90.7 MHz	5	RTÉ 2fm
96.7 MHz	5	RTÉ lyric fm
92.9 MHz	5	RTÉ Raidió na Gaeltachta
94.9 MHz	1.5	Classic Hits 4FM
98.1 MHz	5	Dublin's 98FM
100.3 MHz	12.5	Radio Nova 100
101.8 MHz	0.5	Today FM
102.2 MHz	2	Q102
103.2 MHz	1	Dublin City FM
103.8 MHz	5	SPIN 1038
104.4 MHz	5	FM104
106.0 MHz	10	Newstalk
106.4 MHz	0.5	Raidió Na Life
106.8 MHz	0.5	Sunshine 106.8

=== Three Rock relay transmitters ===
DTT Relay	County	Mux 1	Mux 2	kW	Pol
Greenore	Louth	41	44	0.2	V
Greystones	Wicklow	42	45	0.5	V

== Bibliography ==
- Dún Laoghaire-Rathdown County Council (2009). Did You Know...? Forgotten Aspects of our Local Heritage. Dublin: Dun Laoghaire Rathdown County Council. ISBN 978-0-9557829-2-3.
- Healy, Patrick (April 2005). Rathfarnham Roads (PDF). Dublin: South Dublin Libraries. ISBN 0-9547660-3-2.
- Joyce, Weston St. John (1994) [first published 1912]. The Neighbourhood of Dublin. Dublin: Hughes and Hughes. ISBN 0-7089-9999-9.
- Discovery Series No. 50: Dublin, Kildare, Meath, Wicklow (Map) (6th ed.). 1:50,000. Discovery Series. Ordnance Survey Ireland. 2010. ISBN 978-1-907122-17-0.
- Pearson, Peter (1998). Between the Mountains and the Sea. Dún Laoghaire–Rathdown County Council. Dublin: O'Brien Press. ISBN 0-86278-582-0.
