= Prince William's Seat =

Mountain in Counties Dublin/Wicklow, Ireland

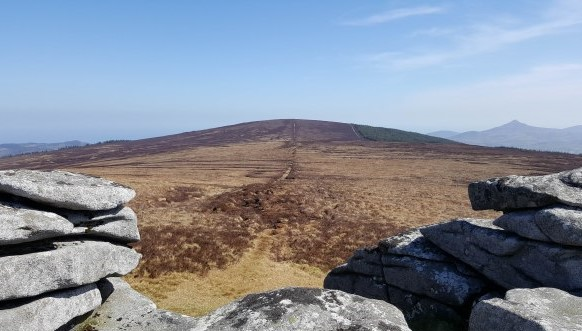
- Summit of Prince William's Seat from a large granite Tor near Knocknagon

Highest point
- Elevation: 555 m (1,821 ft)
- Prominence: 63 m (207 ft)
- Listing: Arderin
- Coordinates: 53.202179°N 6.239552°W

Geography
- Location within island of Ireland
- Location: County Wicklow, Ireland
- Parent range: Wicklow Mountains
- OSI/OSNI grid: O176182
- Topo map: OSi Discovery 56

Geology
- Mountain type: Pale grey fine to coarse-grained granite Bedrock

Prince William's Seat at 555 metres (1,821 ft), is the 296th–highest peak in Ireland on the Arderin scale, however, it does not have the elevation to quality as a Vandeleur-Lynam. Prince William's Seat is on the border of the Wicklow Mountains and Dublin Mountains in Ireland, and lies on the northern side of the Glencree valley, positioned at its entrance. Prince William's Seat is separated by a small col from neighbouring Knocknagun, which is also 555 metres (1,821 ft) in height. Prince William's Seat and Knocknagun are popular peaks with hill-walkers.

== Naming ==
According to Irish academic Paul Tempan, the peak was probably named after William, brother of King George IV, following a royal visit to Ireland in 1821. Tempan has not been able to find any evidence of an Irish native name prior to "Prince William's Seat" (historical maps such as Wright's Guide to the County of Wicklow (1827), simply list the area as the "Commons of Ballynulty", a local townland).

Tempan wondered whether the neighbouring peak of Knocknagun (Irish: Cnoc na gCon, meaning 'hill of the dogs'), which is of equal height and only separated by a small saddle, was the name given to both peaks. There is a granite Tor near the summit of Knocknagun, which would have served as a resting place (or "seat") for the hunting parties of the Fitzwilliam family, who owned the lands from the mid-16th century to the late 17th century.

== Hill walking ==
Prince William's Seat is described as a popular hill walking location for families given its ease of access and proximity to Dublin City. A recommended route is the 10.5-kilometre 3-4 hour "loop route" that starts from a forest car park at the Boranaraltry Bridge in Glencullen, rises up to the summit of Knocknagon through the Glencullen Forest, and then crosses to the summit of Prince William's Seat, before returning to the bridge.

== Fitzwilliam's Seat ==
Near the summit of Knocknagon is a large granite Tor known as Fitzwilliam's Seat, which stands out amongst the flat boggy terrain of the area.

== Bibliography ==
- Fairbairn, Helen (2014). Dublin & Wicklow: A Walking Guide. Collins Press. ISBN 978-1848892019.
- Fairbairn, Helen (2014). Ireland's Best Walks: A Walking Guide. Collins Press. ISBN 978-1848892118.
- MountainViews Online Database (Simon Stewart) (2013). A Guide to Ireland's Mountain Summits: The Vandeleur-Lynams & the Arderins. Collins Books. ISBN 978-1-84889-164-7.
- Dillion, Paddy (2005). The Irish Coast to Coast Walk: Dublin to Bray Head. Cicerone. ISBN 978-1852844332.

== Gallery ==
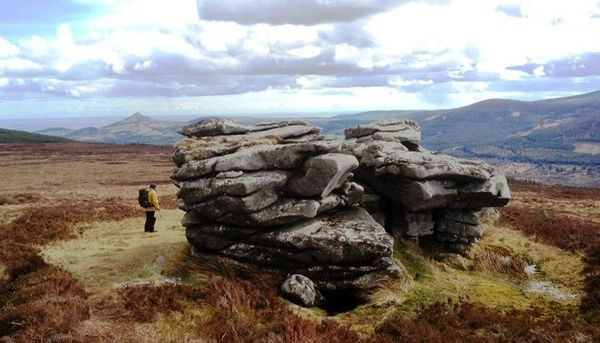
Granite Tor of Fitzwilliam's Seat near the summit of Knocknagun

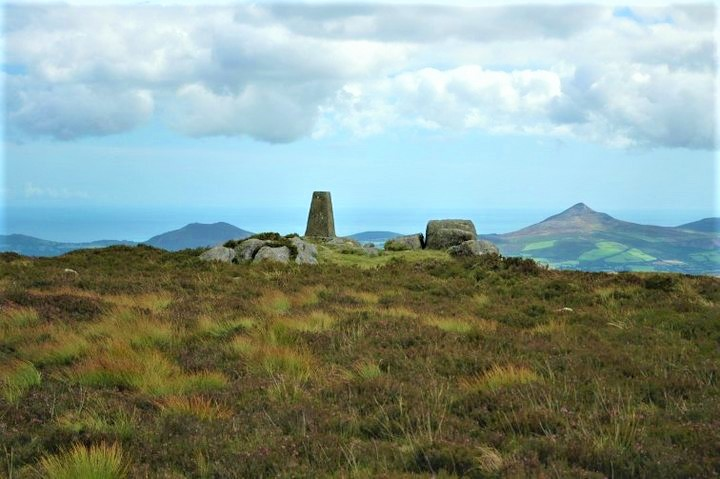
Summit triangulation pillar. In the distance is the Great Sugar Loaf (right), and Little Sugar Loaf (left)

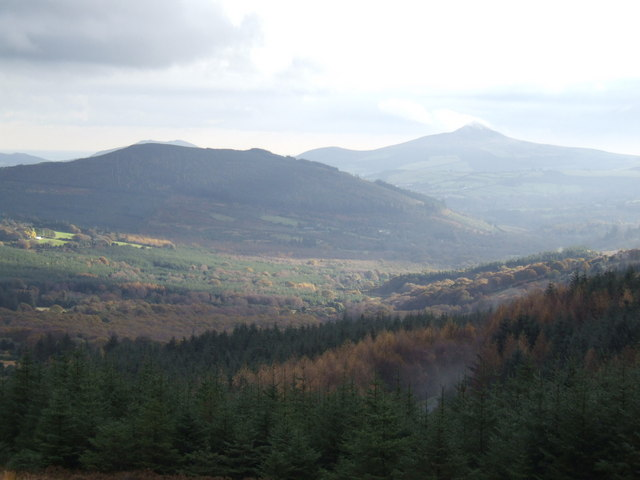
Knocknagun and Prince William's Seat from Glencree; Great Sugar Loaf is back right.

== See also ==
- Wicklow Way
- Wicklow Round
- Wicklow Mountains
- Lists of mountains in Ireland
- List of mountains of the British Isles by height
