= John Malone (disambiguation) =

John Malone is an American businessman and philanthropist.

John Malone may also refer to:

== Musicians ==
- J.J. Malone (1935-2004), American blues musician
- J.D. Malone, American singer-songwriter

== Fictional characters ==
- John Malone, a character in Baby (2000 film)

== Others ==
- John R. Malone, inventor of Unifon
- John Joseph Malone, Canadian flying ace
- John Grover Malone, American football player
- John Malone, American voice actor
- J. B. Malone, Irish hillwalking enthusiast

== See also ==
- Johnny Malone (disambiguation)
- Jack Malone (disambiguation)
- John Maloney (disambiguation)
