= Jack Malone =

Jack Malone may refer to:

- Jack Malone (Without a Trace), fictional character in the CBS crime drama Without a Trace
- Jack Malone (rugby union) (1912–1947), Australian rugby union international
- Jack Malone (footballer) (1919–1984), Australian rules footballer for Footscray in the 1930s
- Jack J. Malone (1919–2001), Australian rules footballer for Footscray in the 1940s
