= Ticknock =

Townland in County Dublin, Ireland

Ticknock Tigh an Chnoic (Irish)
- Townland
- Location in Dublin
- Coordinates: 53°15′05″N 6°14′55″W
- Country: Ireland
- Province: Leinster
- County: County Dublin
- Local authority: Dún Laoghaire-Rathdown County Council
- Elevation: 270 m (890 ft)

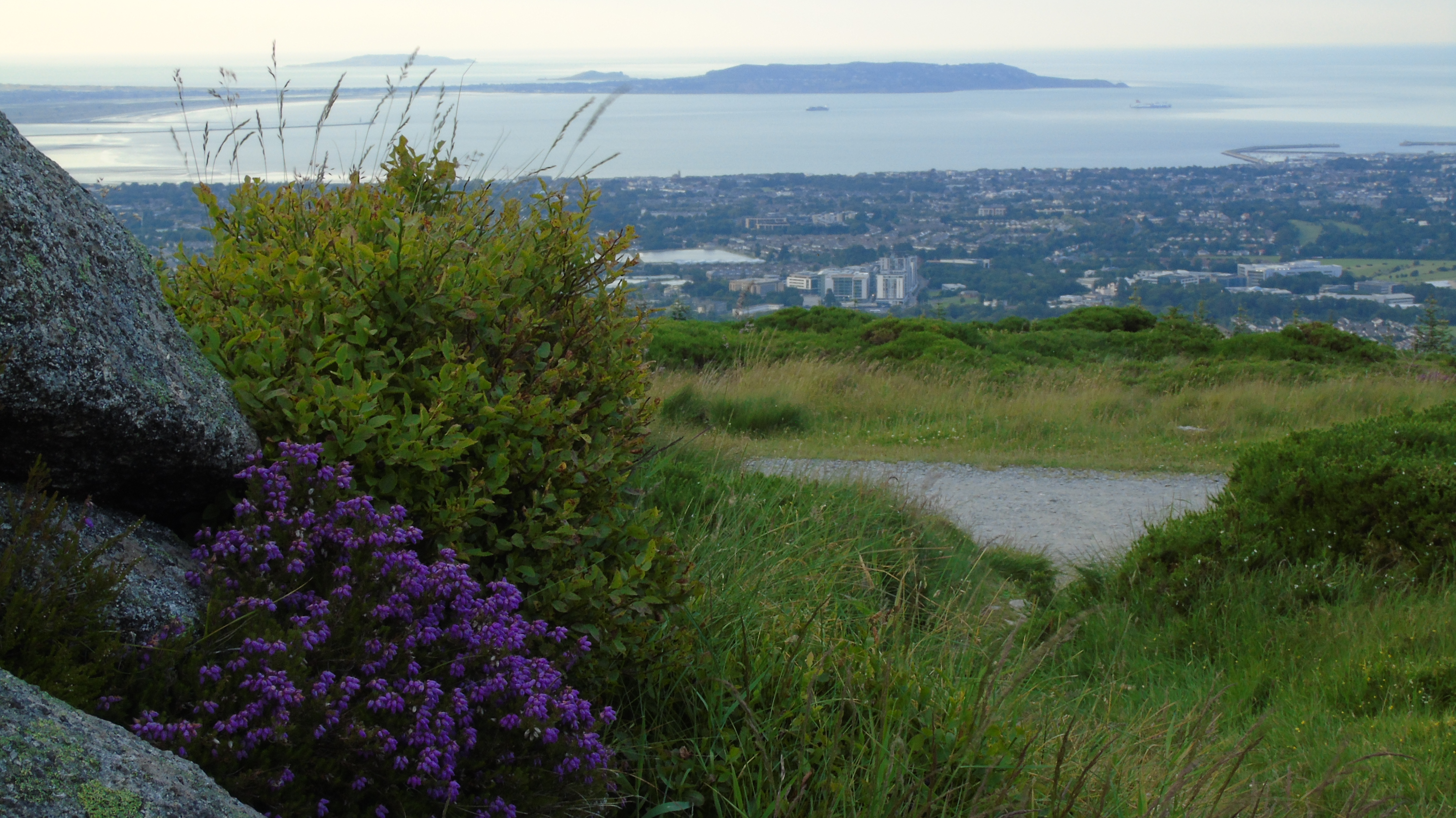
View of Dublin Bay from Ticknock area

Ticknock or Tiknock (Irish: Tigh an Chnoic, meaning 'house of the hill') is a townland in Dún Laoghaire–Rathdown, Dublin, Ireland. It is southwest of Sandyford, at the northeastern foothills of the Dublin Mountains. The townland of Tiknock is in the electoral division of Dundrum, and has an area of approximately 2.6 square kilometres (1.0 sq mi).

There are a number of walking and biking trails in the locality, including in the Ticknock Forest amenity which is managed by Coillte. Described as one of Coillte's "most popular" and most visited sites, during 2020 Coillte replanted a number of sections of the commercial coniferous woodland at Ticknock with native deciduous trees.

Originally a largely rural area at the foot of Three Rock Mountain, a number of housing developments were built in the area (between the townland and the M50 motorway to the north) in the early 21st century.

== See also ==
- List of towns and villages in Ireland
- Kilmashogue (mountain to the west)
