= John Moloney (businessman) =

Irish businessman (born 1954)

- Born: November 1954 (age 71)
- Education: Summerhill College
- Alma mater: University College Dublin; National University of Ireland, Galway
- Occupation: Businessman
- Children: 2 sons

John Joseph Moloney (born November 1954) is an Irish businessman. He was the group managing director of Glanbia from 2001 to 2013. He is the chairman of DCC plc.

== Early life ==
John Joseph Moloney was born in November 1954. He was educated at Summerhill College. He graduated from University College Dublin, and earned an MBA from the National University of Ireland, Galway in 1988.

== Career ==
Moloney began his career at the Waterford Foods Group (now known as Glanbia) in 1987. He served as its group managing director from 2001 to 2013.

Moloney has served as the chairman of DCC plc since 2009. He has been a non-executive director of Smurfit Kappa and Coillte since 2013, and of Greencore from 2013 to January 2019.

== Personal life ==
Moloney is married, and has two sons. He resides in Dungarvan.
