= Johnny Malone =

Johnny Malone may refer to:

- Johnny Malone, character in Ed played by Jacob Pitts
- Johnny Malone, character in Society Girl played by James Dunn (actor)
- Johnny Malone (musician), see 1967 in music

== See also ==
- John Malone (disambiguation)
