= Kilmashogue =

Mountain in Ireland

- Cill Mochióg
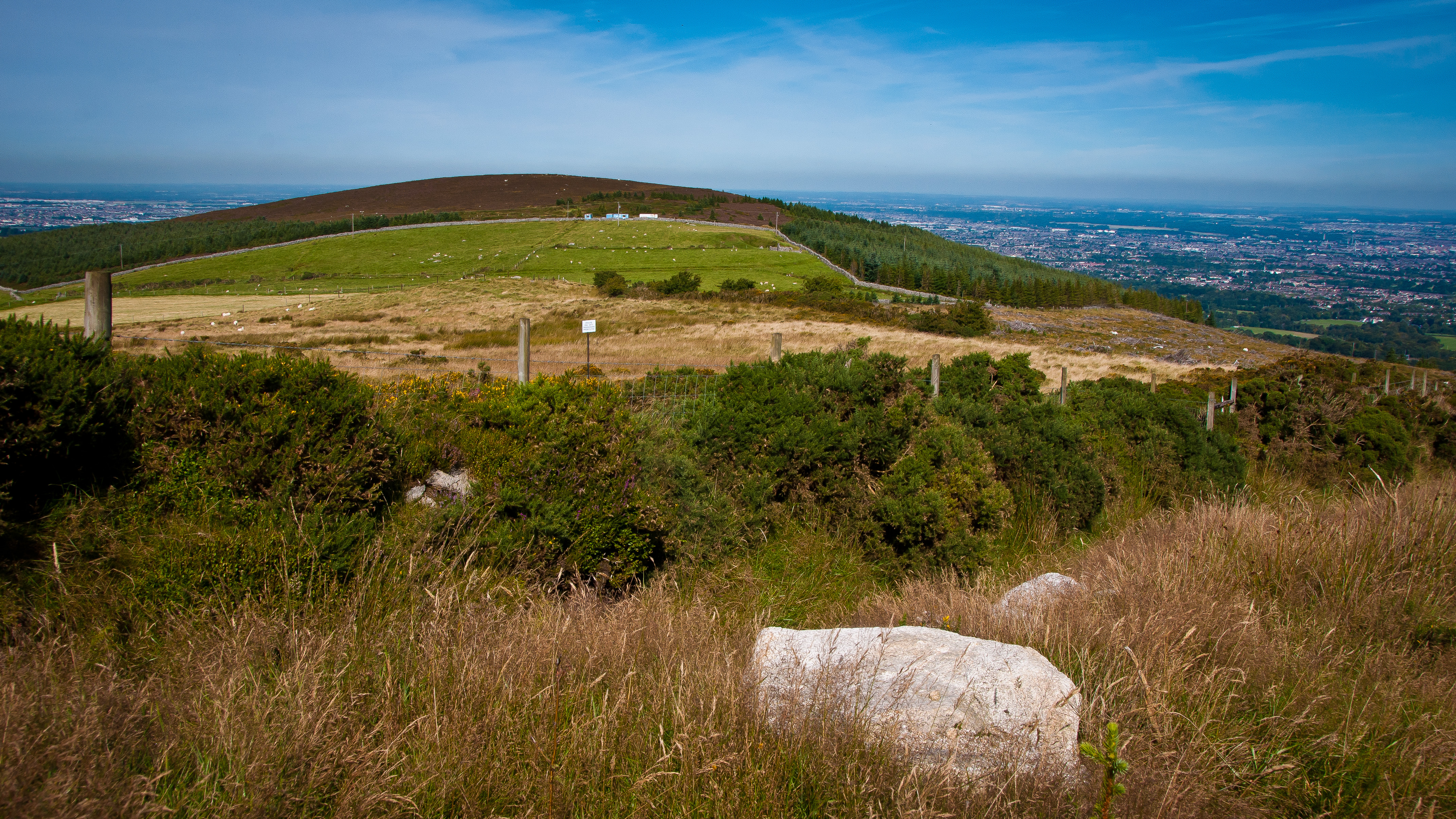
- Kilmashogue Mountain viewed from the southeast

Highest point
- Elevation: 408 m (1,339 ft)
- Coordinates: 53°15′2.01″N 6°16′2.03″W

Geography
- Location within Dublin Location within island of Ireland
- Location: Dún Laoghaire–Rathdown, Ireland
- Parent range: Dublin Mountains
- OSI/OSNI grid: O157236
- Topo map: OSI Discovery #50

Kilmashogue or Kilmashoge (Irish: Cill Mochióg) is a mountain in Dún Laoghaire–Rathdown county in Ireland. It is 408 metres (1,339 feet) high and forms part of the group of hills in the Dublin Mountains which comprises Two Rock, Three Rock, Kilmashogue and Tibradden Mountains. The forest plantation on its northern slope, which is composed mainly of Sitka spruce, Scots pine and beech, is a habitat for Sika deer, hares, rabbits and foxes. A number of prehistoric monuments can be found on the slopes of the mountain.

Coillte, the state-owned enterprise that manages the forestry on the mountain's slopes, suggest that the name Kilmashogue is a corruption of coill na fumsaoige, which means "wood of the ash", or coill na fuiseoige, which means "wood of the lark".

== History ==
It was once believed that Kilmashogue was the site of a battle between the Irish and the Vikings, described in the Annals of the Four Masters, that took place in AD 917. Subsequent research has shown that this event took place near the River Liffey.

=== Kilmashogue wedge tomb ===
On the northern slopes, close to the forest recreation area car park, is the remains of a wedge tomb. It was excavated in 1953 by H. E. Kilbride-Jones, aided by Rúaidhrí de Valera and Seán Ó Nualláin, of the Royal Irish Academy. The tomb consists of two chambers which were originally covered by a cairn of stones. Some of this material can be seen scattered around the tomb area. However, many of the stones were used as material for the stone walls built nearby. The main chamber is 4 metres (13 feet) long and 1.5 metres (4.9 feet) wide and is formed by a triple-walled gallery. This triple-walling is an unusual feature; most wedge tombs are double-walled. It faces towards the summit of Montpelier Hill where there once stood a passage tomb. At some point during the Bronze Age, parts of the chamber were dismantled and used for the construction of three stone-lined cists which were inserted into the cairn material. One cist has had its capstone moved aside so that its chamber is visible. Two middle Bronze Age food vessels and a late Bronze Age cinerary urn were found in the cists during the excavation.

=== Calbeck's Castle ===
Between Kilmashogue and Tibradden Mountains lies Kelly's Glen. A spa was discovered here around 1748 but its distance from the city and the difficulty in getting to it meant it never became popular. On the south-eastern slopes of Kilmashogue, in the saddle between Two Rock Mountain, is a ruin known as Calbeck's Castle. Despite its name, it is a small dwelling house built to accommodate visitors to the spa. Built around 1800, it had fallen into ruin as early as 1821. The lands around this area were owned by Councillor Charles Calbeck, a landowner who made considerable investments in his lands, planting trees, building roads and bridges and improving drainage. The two bridges built by Calbeck have inscriptions dedicated to his sister Sophannie.

=== Larch Hill ===
Also in Kelly's Glen is the estate of Larch Hill. This was built at the end of the eighteenth century by Councillor Calbeck. It is reputed to be the first place in Ireland where the British larch tree was planted. It was taken over in 1939 by the Catholic Boy Scouts of Ireland and has since been used by them as a camp and training centre. In one of the fields is a portal tomb. The supporting stones on one side have fallen inwards causing the monument to collapse. Only one portal stone, 3.5 metres (11 feet) tall, remains standing. Around the monument, almost completely buried, is a series of large boulders that probably formed a ring of standing stones.

=== Standing stones ===
On the northwestern slopes, in a field near the village of Rockbrook, are two standing stones, square in section and approximately 1.8 metres (5.9 feet) tall. Another standing stone, 1.4 metres (4.6 feet) tall, lies nearby.

=== The Brehon's Chair ===
Further down the northern slopes, lying in a housing estate near Marlay Park, is another portal tomb, known as the "Brehon's Chair". All that remains are three large stones, originally the door stone and portal stones of the monument, one of which is 3 metres (9.8 feet) tall. The name Brehon's Chair was given to the monument in the late eighteenth or early nineteenth century when all such monuments were being ascribed to the Druids. Excavations carried out in the area during the construction of the M50 motorway revealed cooking areas and hut sites as well as a food vessel inserted as a secondary burial. Located nearby was a similar monument which was destroyed in 1876.

=== St Columba's College ===
On Kilmashogue Lane is St Columba's College, a Protestant boarding school. It was originally known as Hollypark and was built near the end of the eighteenth century by Gerald Foot, a wealthy snuff merchant. The school, which was founded in 1843 at Stackallen House, County Meath, moved there in 1849. In the chapel is an early Christian cross found on the mountain near the college. In his A History of the County of Dublin (1905), Francis Erlington Ball states that the barrier of The Pale ran along the northern slopes of Kilmashogue near the college and that the remains of a castle, held by the Harold clan who owned the lands for many years, could be found nearby. Opposite the college is the ruins of a woollen mill which was operated by Thomas Thorncliff until 1880.

== Access and recreation ==
The summit is on privately owned land. There is a Coillte-owned forest recreation area on the northern slopes, along Kilmashogue Lane, which is managed by the Dublin Mountains Partnership. The Wicklow Way passes through this recreation area. It is also possible to access Three Rock and Tibradden Mountains from the recreation area. The wedge tomb can be reached via a trail leading uphill from the recreation area car park. The portal tomb at Larch Hill and the Brehon's Chair are on privately owned land.

== Images ==
Kilmashogue Mountain
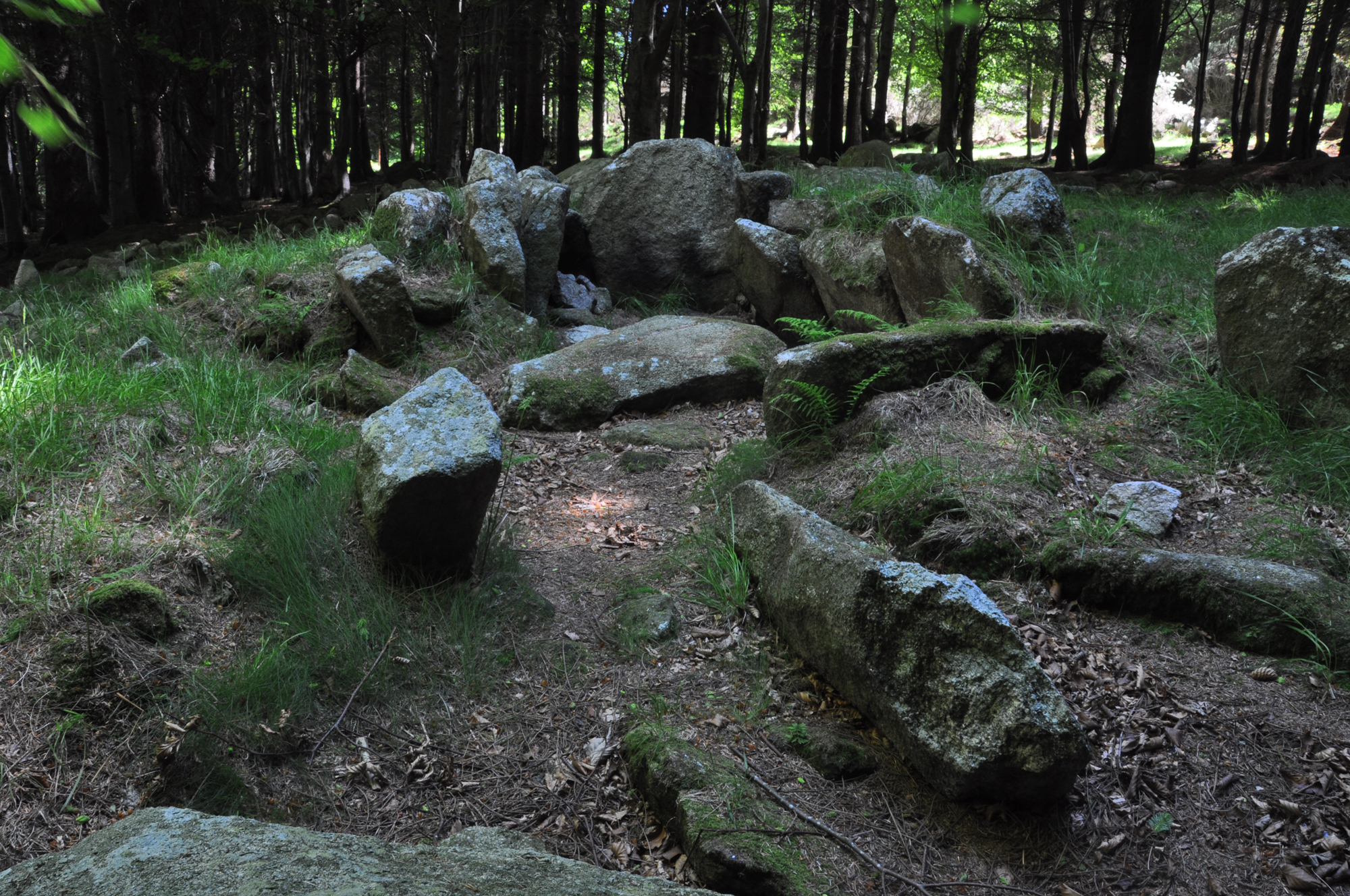
Kilmashogue wedge tomb

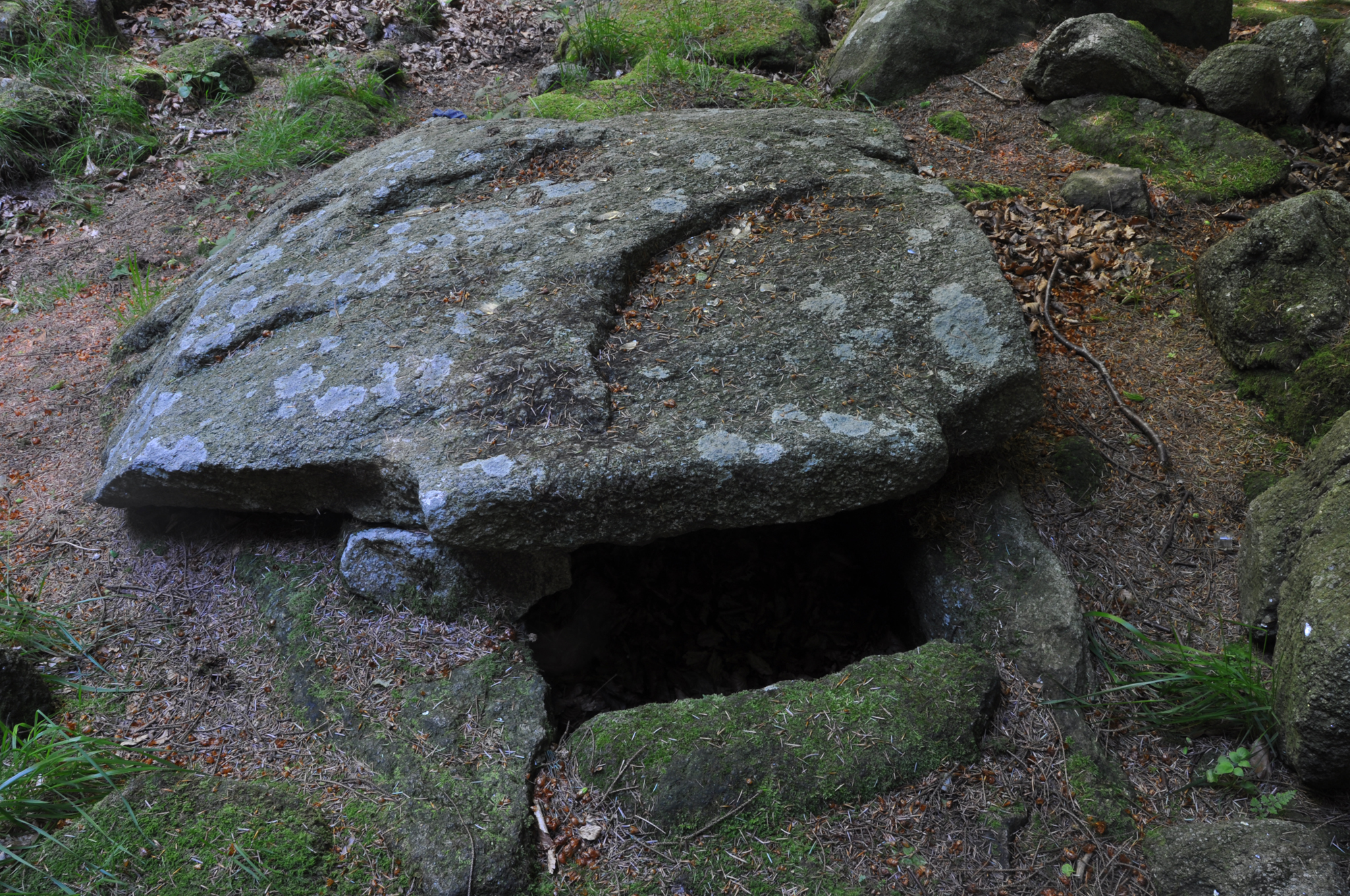
Detail of a cist at Kilmashogue wedge tomb

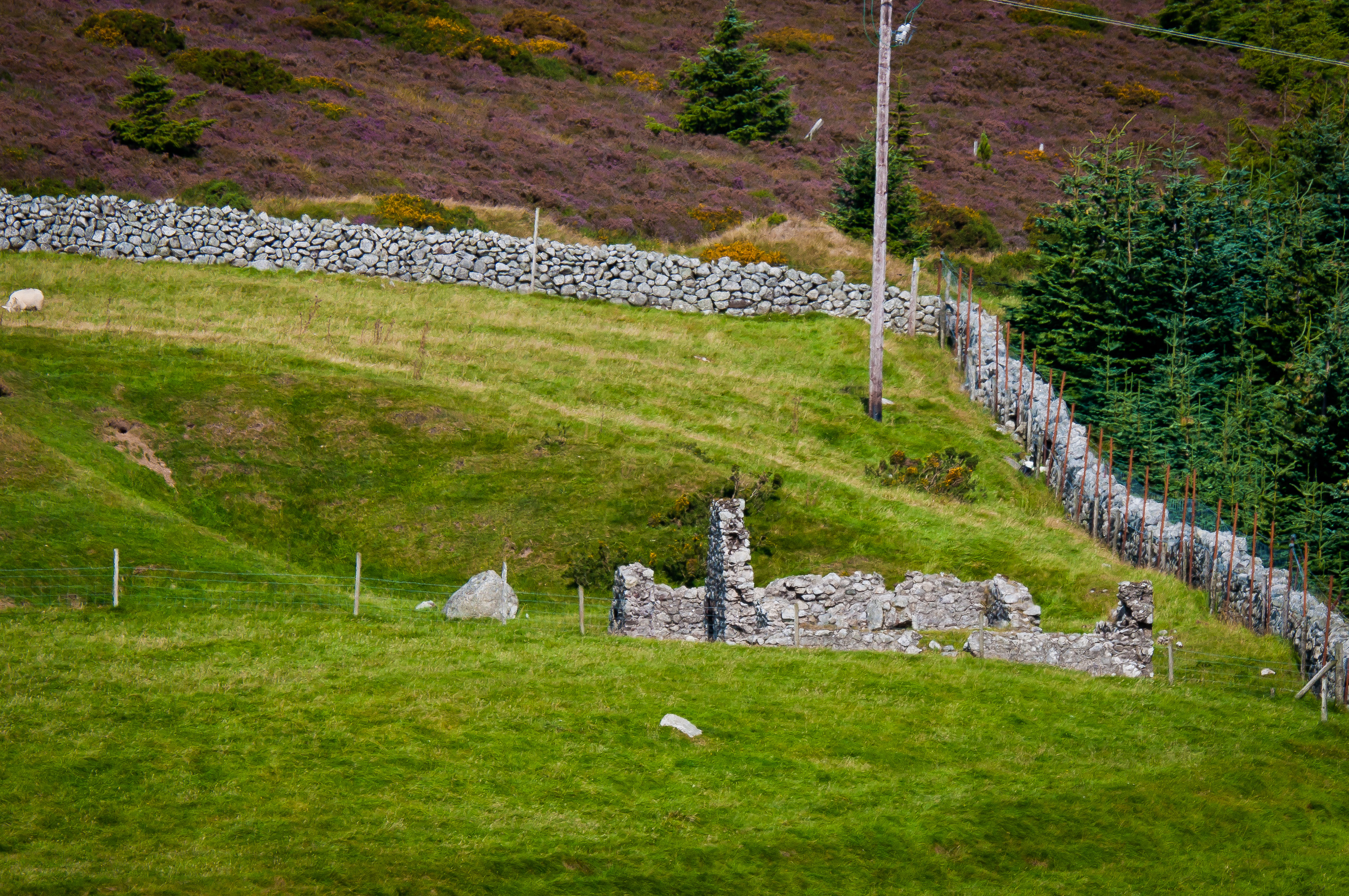
Calbeck's Castle

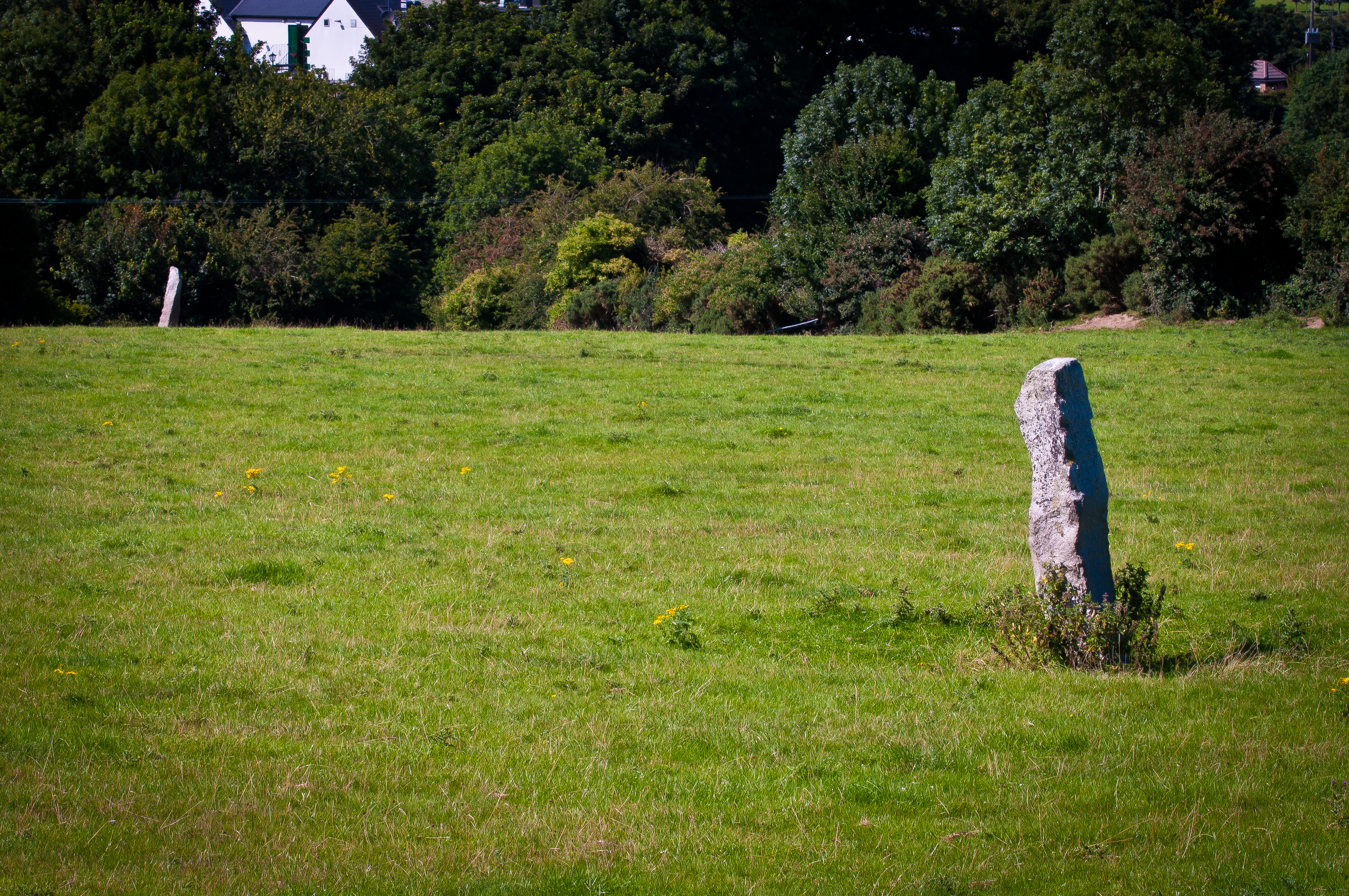
Kilmashogue standing stones
