= Jack Malone (footballer) =

Australian rules footballer, born 1919

Personal information
- Full name: Jack Malone
- Born: 28 April 1919; Carlton, Victoria
- Died: 16 September 1984 (aged 65); Hampton, Victoria
- Original team: North Footscray
- Height: 178 cm (5 ft 10 in)
- Weight: 76 kg (168 lb)

Playing career^{1}
Years	Club	Games (Goals)
1939	Footscray	1 (0)
- ^{1} Playing statistics correct to the end of 1939.

Jack Malone (28 April 1919 – 16 September 1984) was an Australian rules footballer who played with Footscray in the Victorian Football League (VFL).
