= Jack J. Malone =

Australian rules footballer, born 1919

Jack Malone

Personal information
- Full name: John Joseph Malone
- Born: 22 December 1919; Maldon, Victoria
- Died: 11 December 2001 (aged 81)
- Original team: North Footscray
- Height: 168 cm (5 ft 6 in)
- Weight: 77 kg (170 lb)

Playing career^{1}
Years	Club	Games (Goals)
1941, 1943	Footscray	6 (0)
- ^{1} Playing statistics correct to the end of 1943.

John Joseph Malone (22 December 1919 – 11 December 2001) was an Australian rules footballer who played with Footscray in the Victorian Football League (VFL).

He served in the Royal Australian Air Force during World War II.
