= John Maloney =

John Maloney may refer to:

- John David Maloney (born 1945), former Canadian Member of Parliament for Welland, current mayor of Port Colborne, Ontario
- John William Maloney (1883–1954), Canadian Member of Parliament for Northumberland
- John Maloney (baseball), Major League Baseball center fielder
- John H. Maloney (1918–2001), Canadian politician and physician
- John W. Maloney (1896–1978), American architect
- Jon Maloney (born 1985), English footballer
- Johnny Maloney (1932-2004), British Olympic boxer

== See also ==
- John F. Malony (1857–1919), American businessman and politician
- John Mahoney (disambiguation)
- John Moloney (disambiguation)
