= Little Sugar Loaf =

Mountain in County Wicklow, Ireland

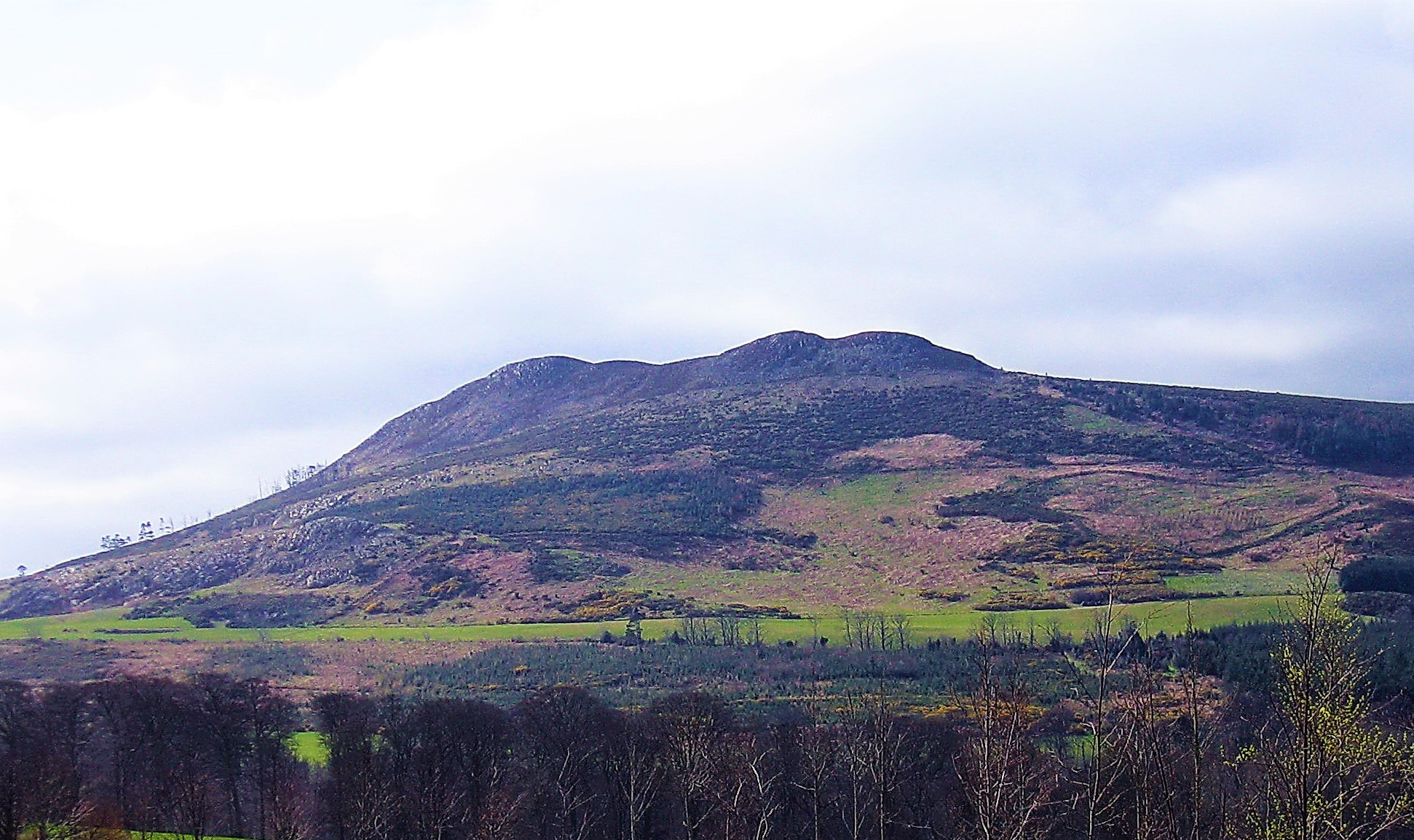
- Little Sugar Loaf, from the east

Highest point
- Elevation: 342 m (1,122 ft)
- Prominence: 247 m (810 ft)
- Listing: Marilyn
- Coordinates: 53°10′8″N 6°7′12″W

Naming
- Native name: Giolspar
- English translation: Giltspur

Geography
- Location within Ireland
- Location: County Wicklow, Ireland
- Parent range: Wicklow Mountains
- OSI/OSNI grid: O2606514480
- Topo map: OSi Discovery 56

Geology
- Mountain type: Quartzite Bedrock

Little Sugar Loaf (Irish: Giolspar, meaning 'Giltspur') is a 342 metres (1,122 ft) hill in the far northeastern sector of the Wicklow Mountains in Ireland. It does not have the elevation to rank on Arderin, Hewitt, or Vandeleur-Lynam scales, however, its prominence of 247 metres (810 ft) ranks it as a Marilyn.

The Little Sugar Loaf is situated northeastwards from the Great Sugar Loaf, but separated by the N11 dual carriageway. The northern side of Little Sugar Loaf directly overlooks the town of Bray; the eastern side (see photo) looks across the R761 between Bray and Greystones to the western slope of Bray Head. Little Sugar Loaf has a distinctive profile of a rocky double summit. Like the Great Sugar Loaf, it consists of Cambrian Period quartzite bedrock.

Irish academic Paul Tempan notes that the Irish name Giolspar is likely a translation of the English "gilt spur", based on a record of a 12th-century transaction by Diarmait Mac Murchada of land in the area which involved the payment of a pair of "gilt spurs" to him and his heirs on an annual basis.

== Bibliography ==
- Fairbairn, Helen (2014). Dublin & Wicklow: A Walking Guide. Collins Press. ISBN 978-1848892019.
- Fairbairn, Helen (2014). Ireland's Best Walks: A Walking Guide. Collins Press. ISBN 978-1848892118.
- MountainViews Online Database (Simon Stewart) (2013). A Guide to Ireland's Mountain Summits: The Vandeleur-Lynams & the Arderins. Collins Books. ISBN 978-1-84889-164-7.

== See also ==
- Wicklow Way
- Wicklow Mountains
- Lists of mountains in Ireland
- List of mountains of the British Isles by height
- List of Marilyns in the British Isles
