= John Moloney (Australian footballer) =

Australian rules footballer

Personal information
- Full name: John Bergin Moloney
- Born: 15 November 1881; Williamstown, Victoria
- Died: 20 June 1948 (aged 66); Fitzroy, Victoria
- Original team: Port Melbourne

Playing career^{1}
Years	Club	Games (Goals)
1904	St Kilda	3 (0)
- ^{1} Playing statistics correct to the end of 1904.

John Bergin Moloney (15 November 1881 – 20 June 1948) was an Australian rules footballer who played with St Kilda in the Victorian Football League (VFL).
