= Great Sugar Loaf =

Mountain in County Wicklow, Ireland

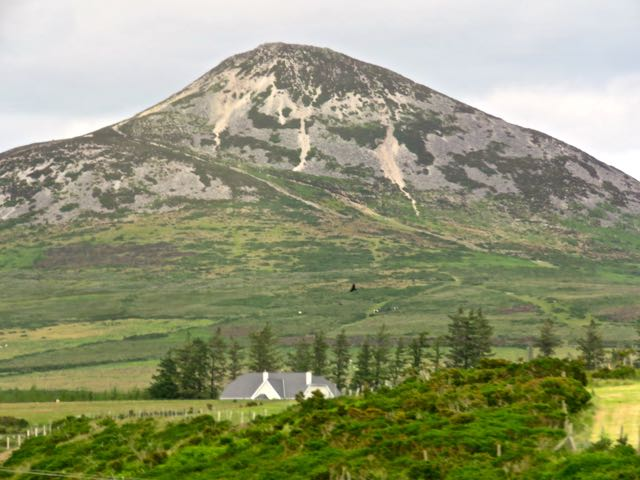
- Great Sugar Loaf, from the south

Highest point
- Elevation: 501 m (1,644 ft)
- Prominence: 216 m (709 ft)
- Listing: Marilyn, Arderin
- Coordinates: 53°9′18″N 6°9′0″W

Naming
- Native name: Ó Cualann
- English translation: lump of Cualu

Geography
- Location within island of Ireland
- Location: County Wicklow, Ireland
- Parent range: Wicklow Mountains
- OSI/OSNI grid: O2377613088
- Topo map: OSi Discovery 56

Geology
- Mountain type: Quartzite bedrock

Climbing
- Easiest route: Red Lane car-park

Great Sugar Loaf (Irish: Ó Cualann, meaning 'lump of Cualu') at 501 metres (1,644 ft), is the 404th–highest peak in Ireland on the Arderin scale, however, being below 600 m it does not rank on the Vandeleur-Lynam or Hewitt scales. The mountain is in the far northeastern section of the Wicklow Mountains, in Ireland, and overlooks the village of Kilmacanogue. The profile of the mountain means it can be mistaken for a dormant volcano. It owes its distinctive shape, however, to the erosion-resistant metamorphosed deep-sea sedimentary deposit from which its quartzite composition was derived.

== Naming ==
According to Irish academic Paul Tempan, the term "sugarloaf" is widely applied in Britain and Ireland to hills of conical form, in much the same way that the name pain de sucre is used in France. Tempan also notes that there is a widespread misconception that the term refers to a kind of bread, when it refers in fact to the stalagmite-like form in which sugar was sold up until the 19th-century, prior to the advent of granulated sugar. The traditional method for making a sugarloaf was complex, involving repeated purifications, moulding and a leaching process gradually to refine the mass of sugar, by ridding it of its associated molasses and eventually all trace of colour, leaving it a glistening white. This form of sugar is still used in the German alcoholic drink, Feuerzangenbowle.

Tempan notes that a 1935 article by Eoin MacNeill in the Journal of the Royal Society of Antiquaries of Ireland (JRSAI), on placenames mentioned in the Togail Bruidne Dá Derga, suggested that Irish: Ó Cualann could refer to "sheep of Cualu", but considered it unlikely.

== Geography ==
The Great Sugar Loaf overlooks villages of Kilmacanogue and Delgany, and is just north of the Glen of the Downs. The mountain sits apart from the main nearby peaks of the Wicklow Mountains, such as Maulin 570 metres (1,870 ft) and Djouce 725 metres (2,379 ft), and it is circled by roads on all sides.

The two small northern and southern shoulders of the Great Sugar Loaf are often confused as being the Little Sugar Loaf, however, this mountain lies to the east on the other side of the N11 road motorway at Kilmacanogue.

Though only 501 metres (1,644 ft) in elevation, the Great Sugar Loaf's isolation from other hills gives it a large proportional prominence of 216 metres (709 ft), and qualifies it as a Marilyn. In addition, the steep slopes and volcanic appearance of the Great Sugar Loaf add to the distinctiveness of its profile.

== Geology ==
The Great Sugar Loaf is composed of Cambrian Period quartzite bedrock (called the Bray Head Formation), in contrast to the rounded Wicklow Mountains to the west, which are mostly made of Devonian Period granite. The Great Sugar Loaf is also popularly mistaken for a dormant volcano, however, it is instead an erosion-resistant metamorphosed sedimentary deposit from the deep sea. Cambrian quartzite metamorphosed from sandstone at the bottom of deep oceans is extremely resistant to weathering.

The Kilmacanogue valley, which the Great Sugar Loaf overlooks, was part of a regional north-south subglacial meltwater drainage route that included the Scalp (to the north) and the Glen of the Downs (to the southeast).

== Hill walking ==
The Great Sugar Loaf is popular with hill walkers given its proximity to Dublin, access from the N11 motorway, and relatively worn pathways that do not require full hiking boots or extensive navigation skills. In addition, the mountain also offers some mild scrambling up rocky gullies which adds to its appeal.

The easiest route is from the south, starting from an established large car-park (O235119) situated off the middle of the Red Lane road (also known as the L1031 road) that runs along the southern boundary of the mountain; the car-park is already at an elevation of circa 290 metres (950 ft), and thus the total climbing elevation required is only 210 metres (690 ft). The 3.5-kilometre route from the car-park to the summit and back takes between 1–1.5 hours, and includes a walk over flat moorland paths and a final scrambling ascent through some rocky gullies.

A longer route can be done from the east, starting from lower down at the Kilmacanogue GAA car-park (O233141); this 5-kilometre route from the car-park to the summit and back takes 2–2.5 hours, and is mostly on moorland paths with some scree and gravel sections.

== Bibliography ==
- Fairbairn, Helen (2014). Dublin & Wicklow: A Walking Guide. Collins Press. ISBN 978-1848892019.
- Fairbairn, Helen (2014). Ireland's Best Walks: A Walking Guide. Collins Press. ISBN 978-1848892118.
- MountainViews Online Database (Simon Stewart) (2013). A Guide to Ireland's Mountain Summits: The Vandeleur-Lynams & the Arderins. Collins Books. ISBN 978-1-84889-164-7.

== Gallery ==
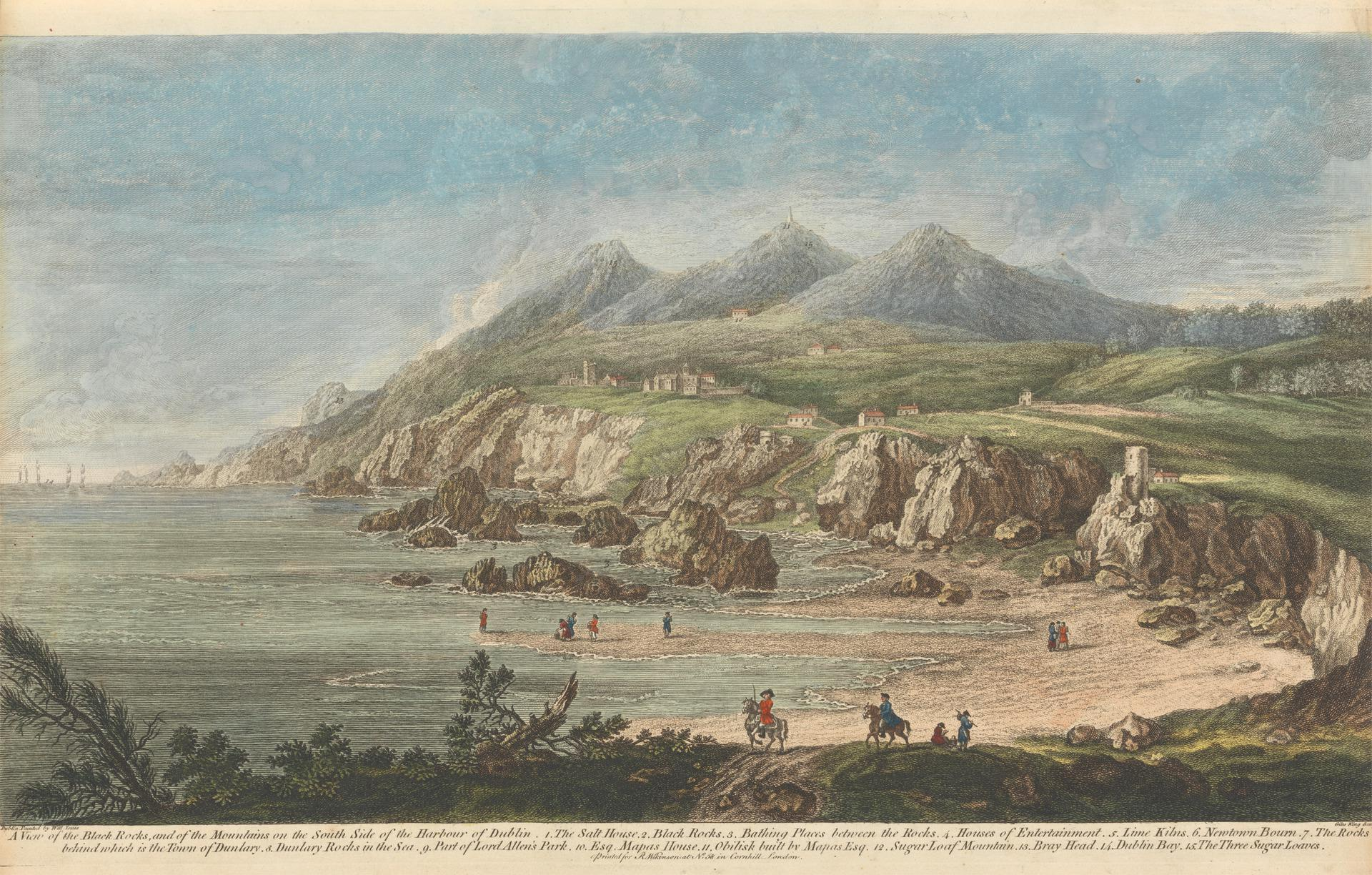
The Great Sugar Loaf as depicted (with other mountains) in an early 18th century engraving by Giles King

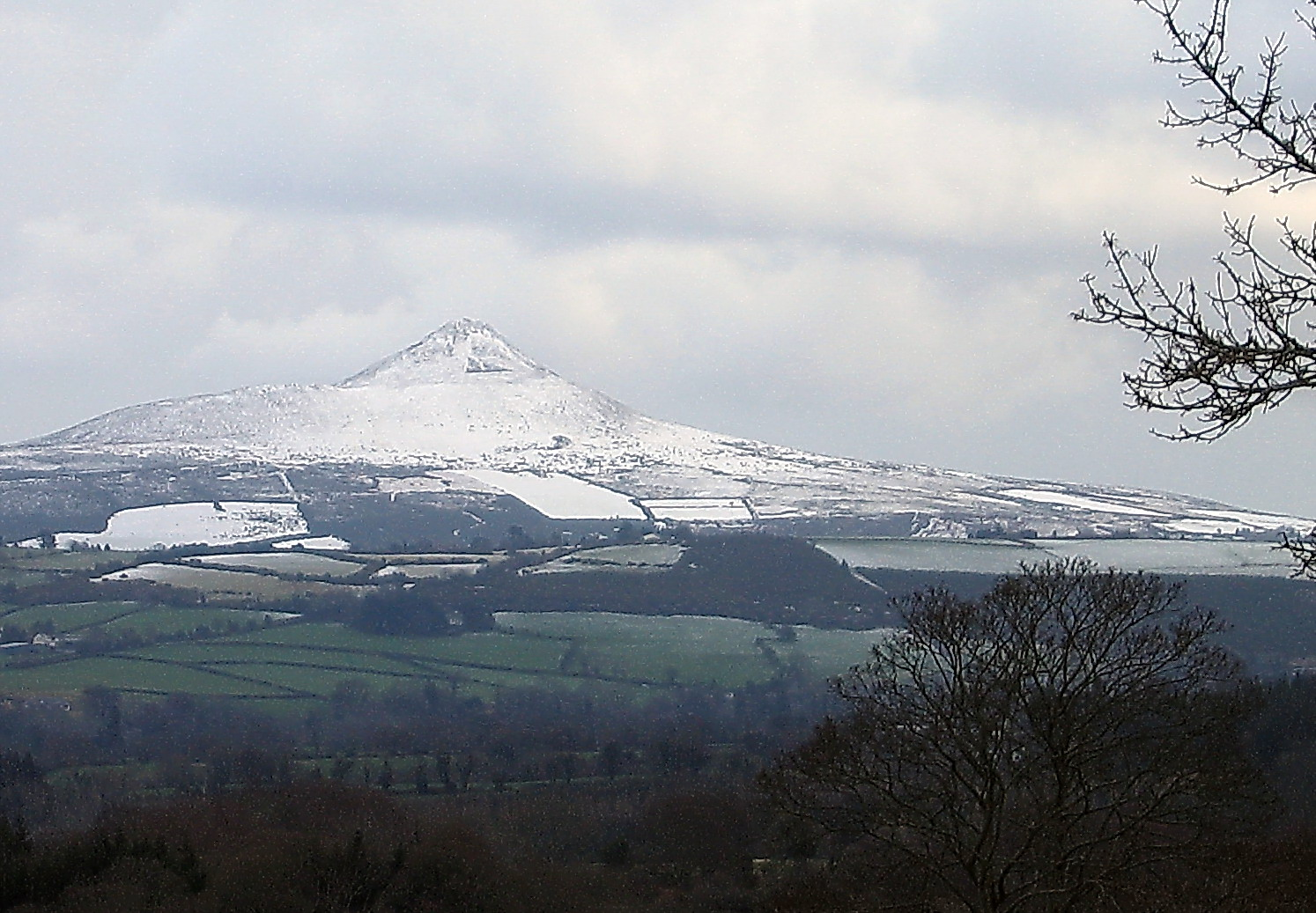
From the west in winter

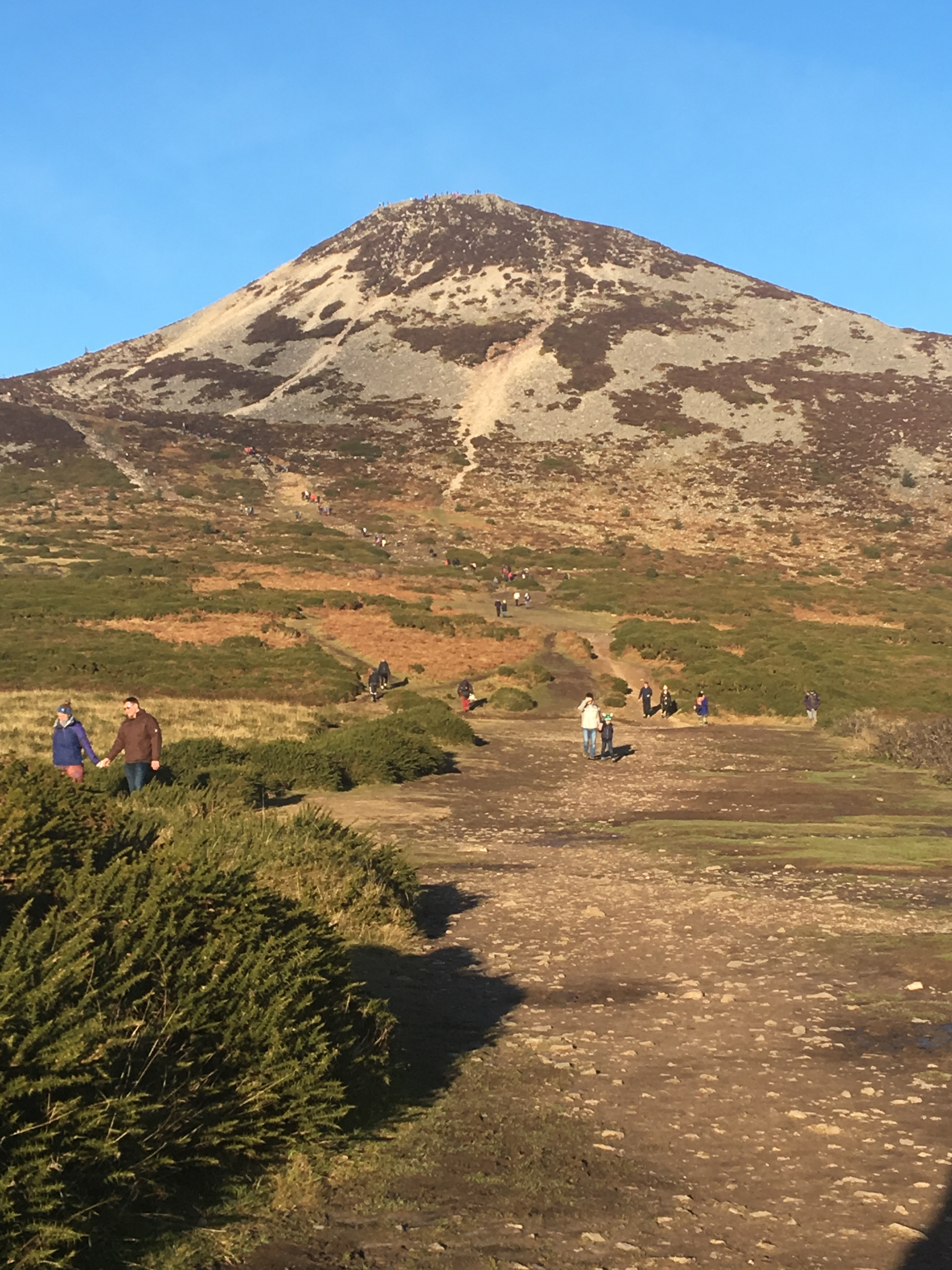
From the Red Lane car-park

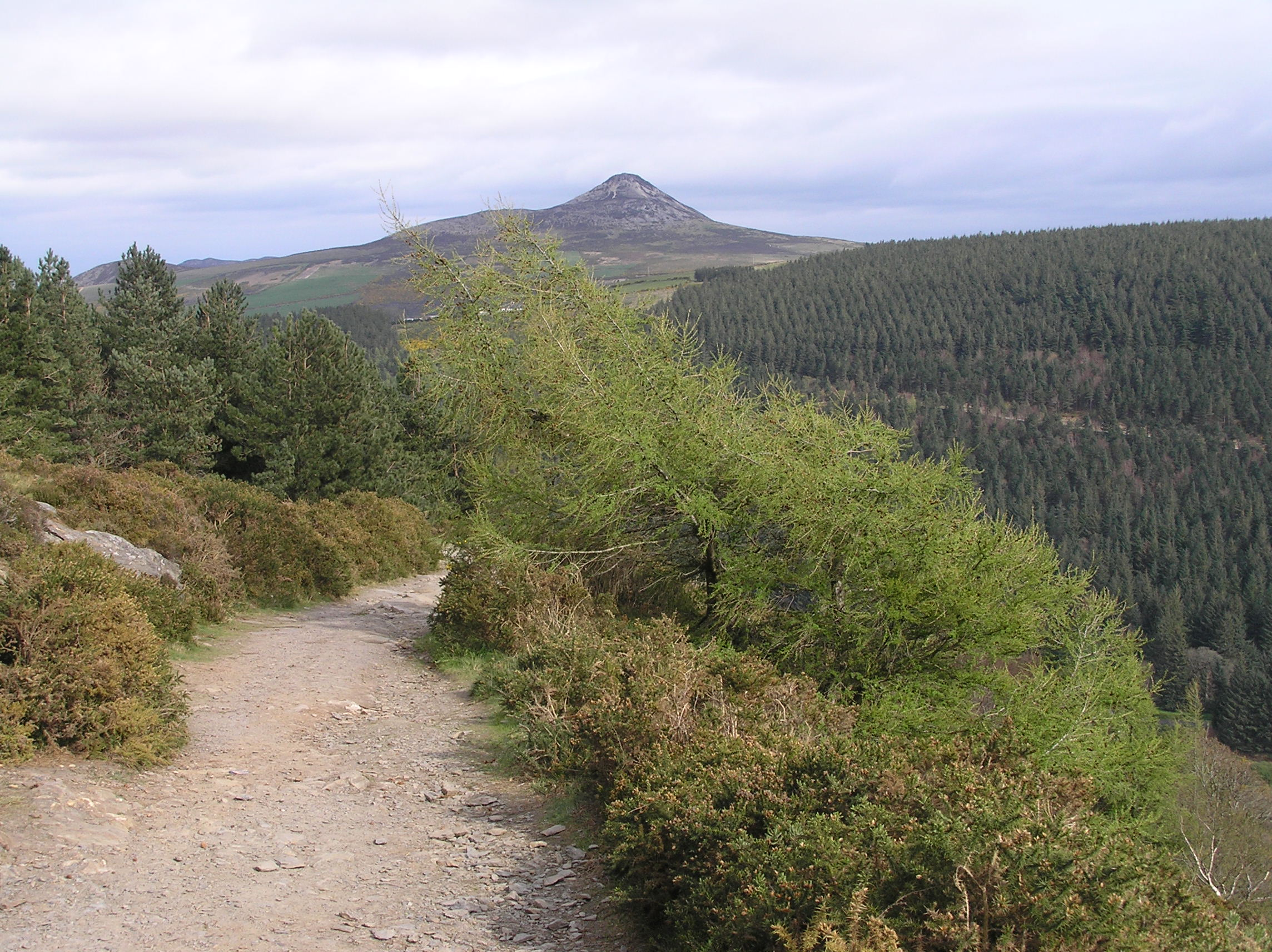
From Maulin

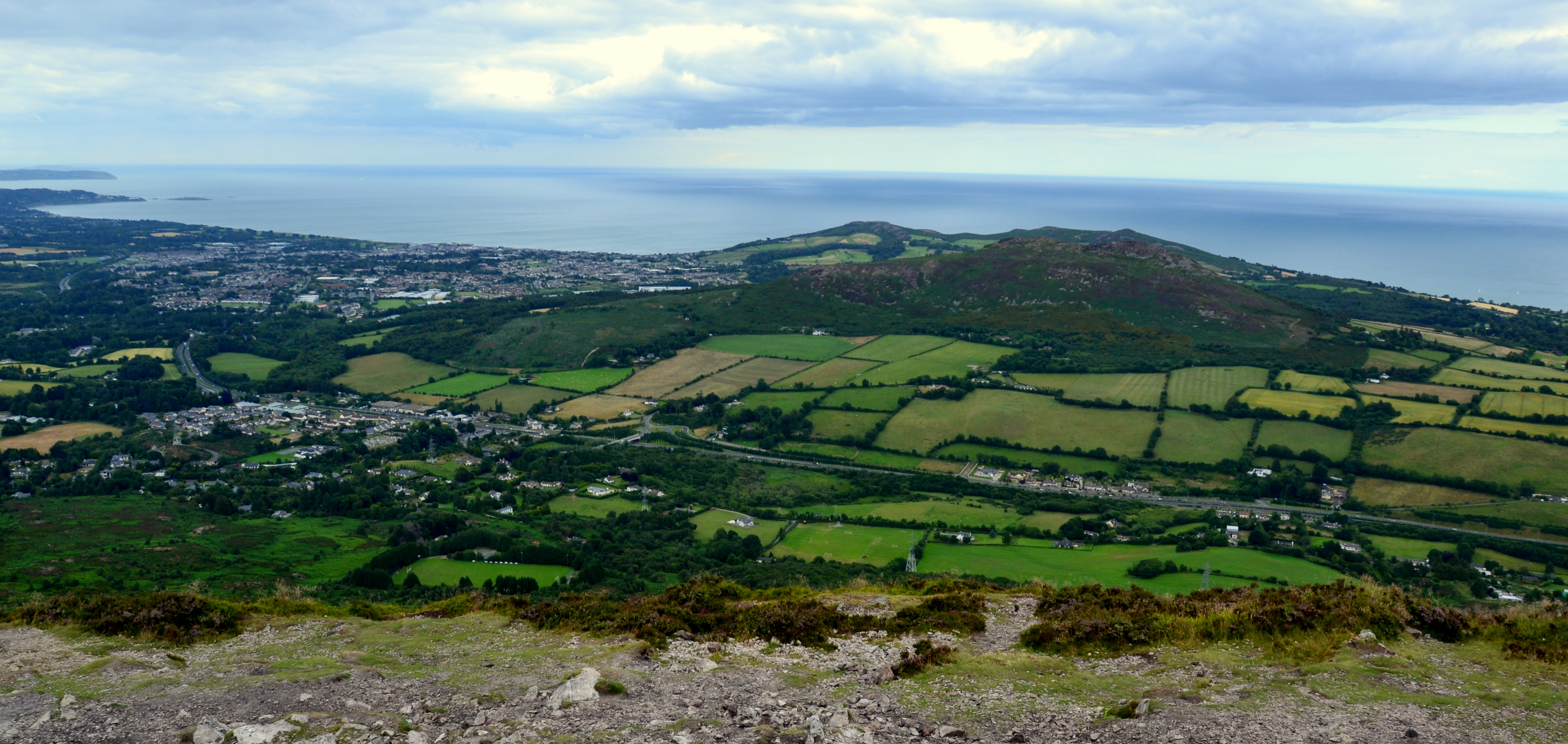
View to Little Sugar Loaf

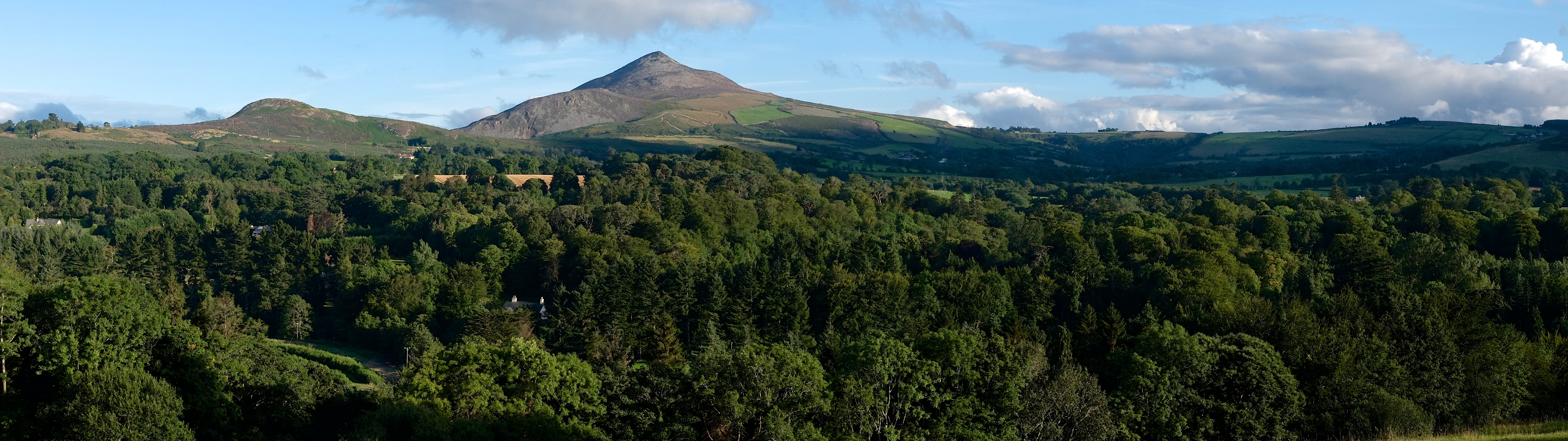
From the Powerscourt Estate

== See also ==
- Wicklow Way
- Wicklow Mountains
- Lists of mountains in Ireland
- List of mountains of the British Isles by height
- List of Marilyns in the British Isles
