= Coillte =

Irish state forestry company

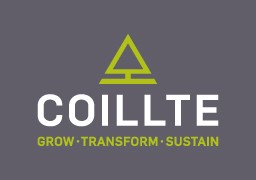
- Type: Statutory Corporation
- Industry: Forestry
- Founded: December 8, 1988; 37 years ago
- Headquarters: Newtownmountkennedy, Ireland
- Owner: Minister for Agriculture, Food and the Marine; Minister for Finance; (on behalf of the Irish state)
- Number of employees: 862 (2016)
- Divisions: Forestry; Land Solutions; Medite Smartply; The Nature Trust
- Website: coillte.ie

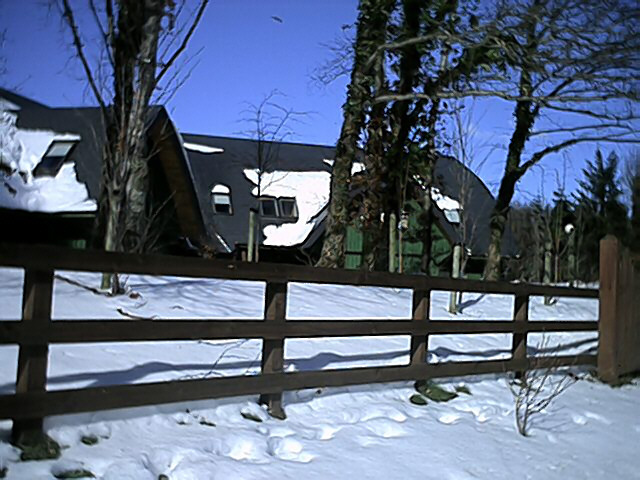
Coillte headquarters, Newtownmountkennedy

Coillte (/ˈkwɪltʃə/; Irish pronunciation: [ˈkəil̠ʲtʲə]; meaning 'forests'/'woods') is a state-owned commercial forestry business in Ireland based in Newtownmountkennedy. Coillte manage approximately 7% of the country's land, and operates three businesses: their core forestry business, a 'land solutions' division and a wood panel manufacturing business called 'Medite Smartply'.

== Operation ==
The company was incorporated in December 1988 and commenced trading in January 1989 when it took over the forestry activities previously carried out by the Department of Agriculture, Food and the Marine. Shares are held by the Minister for Agriculture, Food and the Marine and Minister for Finance on behalf of the Irish Government. During 2016, the organisation had an average of 862 employees. The Coillte estate is 4,450 square kilometres of which 79% is forest; it manages over 50% of forested land in the country.

In its 27 years of operation between 1989 and 2016, Coillte had:

- Grown its forest and land estate from 396,000 hectares to over 440,000 hectares
- Increased operating profits from a loss of €0.4 million to operating profits of €64.9 million (2016)
- Grown turnover from €38.0 million to €287.7 million (2016)
- Increased log sales from 1.5 million cubic metres to 1.6 million cubic metres (2016)

According to the Coillte website, 20% of its estate is managed with biodiversity as the primary objective. Other entities have however questioned Coillte's commercially focused practices and the amount of land afforded to native species.

== Developments ==
In 2011, there was speculation that Coillte could be sold by the Government of Ireland as part of cost-cutting measures. As of 2011, Coillte was also seeking to calculate the aggregate economic value of its 445,000ha of forest estate.

In 2018 the organisation was reportedly criticised for payment and communication issues with some landowners.

In 2019, Coillte set up a not-for-profit entity, "The Nature Trust", as part of a native woodland restoration plan. In 2025, it was announced this would be shutting down.
