= Murder of Jastine Valdez =

24-year-old Ireland-based Filipina who was abducted and murdered in 2018

- Jastine Valdez
- Date: 19 May 2018
- Location: County Dublin, Ireland
- Cause: Strangulation
- Deaths: Jastine Valdez (aged 24 years)
- Burial: Aritao, The Philippines
- Suspects: Mark Hennessy

Jastine Valdez was a Filipina woman living in Ireland, who was abducted on 19 May 2018 near Bray, County Wicklow and whose dead body was thereafter discovered near Puck's Castle in County Dublin. After an intensive manhunt, the prime suspect in her abduction was shot and killed the following day by armed police investigating her disappearance.

The dramatic circumstances of Valdez's abduction and murder caused widespread outrage in Ireland, where non-gangland related violent crime such as kidnapping is a rare occurrence. Valdez's murder was committed soon after the murder of Ana Kriégel, with both cases leading for calls for the Irish Government to conduct a review into violence against women in Ireland.

== Background ==
Jastine Valdez was born in Aritao, on the northern island of Luzon in the Philippines. She was the only child of Danilo and Teresita Valdez. Valdez raised in the Philippines from a young age by her maternal grandparents Marcelina and Alfredo Caluza, after her own parents had emigrated to Ireland in search of work. Valdez herself moved at the age of 20 to Enniskerry in County Wicklow to be reunited with her parents in 2013. The family lived on the grounds of Charleville House, a stately home on the outskirts of Enniskerry, where her father worked as a groundsman and her mother worked as the housekeeper. Valdez was studying accounting and finance at Tallaght Institute of Technology part-time while also working in a bakery in Bray, County Wicklow.

== Abduction in Enniskerry ==
On Saturday, 19 May 2018, Valdez went to the town of Bray to attend an appointment at the Garda station to renew her residency permit. While in Bray she also went to the gym and to a shop to buy bread. Later that afternoon, Valdez boarded the 185 bus from Bray back to her hometown of Enniskerry and arrived there at 6 pm GMT. From there she had a 15- to 20-minute walk home along the R760 Kilcroney Road.

At 6:15 pm a witness called the Irish emergency telephone number to report seeing a female pedestrian being forced into the back of a dark-coloured SVU, with a partial registration of 171-D and which was later identified as a Nissan Qashqai, close to the entrance of Powerscourt Estate. Minutes after this sighting, another driver saw a distressed female passenger in an SUV banging on its back window. Gardaí from Bray quickly dispatched patrol cars to search the area for the suspect vehicle, and the Garda Air Support Unit dispatched a Eurocopter EC135 to help search from the air.

Around half an hour later, a black Nissan Qashqai was observed driving erratically along Puck's Castle Lane area of Rathmichael, which is approximately six kilometres away from Enniskerry.

== Garda search for suspect ==
Valdez was reported missing by her parents at 11:40 pm, who had become anxious after being repeatedly unable to contact her and seeing a Garda helicopter circling the skies above Enniskerry. Gardaí then linked her disappearance to the earlier reported abduction, as it had occurred on Valdez's route home and witness descriptions of the abducted woman being of Asian descent matched her physical appearance. That night Gardaí issued an appeal for information in connection with Valdez's disappearance and provided a description of the suspect vehicle as well as a partial license plate.

Gardaí were able to identify the vehicle used in the abduction from studying the CCTV recordings from Dublin Bus vehicles that had driven through the area surrounding the abduction site and thus identified the vehicle as a Nissan Qashqai with the license plate 171 D 20419 registered to a woman in Bray. The owner was spoken to early on the morning of Sunday, 20 May 2018, and Gardaí learned that her husband, Mark Hennessy, had left in the vehicle on Saturday and had not returned.

At 3 am, Hennessy was identified as the prime suspect in Valdez's abduction. Gardaí then renewed an appeal for the public's cooperation in locating Valdez, the vehicle, and Mark Hennessy. Hennessy's family home was also put under covert surveillance in case he returned home, with members of the Garda Armed Support Unit being deployed in the area and put on standby to intercept him. At around midday, Gardaí made another public appeal to locate a dark coloured Nissan SUV, with a partial registration number of 171-D-2, in relation to the abduction of Valdez. Following this appeal, Hennessy called his wife to inform her he had done “something awful” and would not be coming back.

== Shooting of suspect in Cherrywood ==
At 5:30 pm, Senior Investigating Officer Detective Superintendent Frank Heneghan held a public press conference and announced the full registration number of Hennessy's Nissan Qashqai, asking the public to inform Gardaí immediately if they see it. Following the public appeal, a witness driving home from work, who had heard public appeals regarding Valdez's abduction, noticed she was driving behind Hennessy's Qashqai in the Shankill area of Dublin. She promptly called the emergency services and followed the vehicle to give real-time updates regarding its location, and finally reported seeing Hennessy drive into Cherrywood Business Park.

At approximately 8 pm, two Gardaí driving an unmarked garda car spotted Hennessy's black Nissan Qashqai parked in a secluded area of the industrial estate's car park. A Civil Defence vehicle helping in the search then blocked off the entrance to the car park to prevent Hennessy escaping. As the Gardaí made their way over, Hennessy attempted to drive off, which prompted a Detective Garda in another unmarked car to block its path by parking lengthways in front. Gardaí believed Hennessy had Valdez in the car and witnessed him self-harm with a Stanley knife. As they got closer, the Gardaí observed that Hennessy was covered in blood from self-inflicted slash wounds to his arm and neck.

Gardaí attempted to open the locked driver's door of the Qashqai, and then tried to break the window by kicking it. Ignoring shouted warnings to drop his weapon, Hennessy instead began to bend down into the passenger footwell. In the belief that Valdez was in the car and Hennessy was about to slit her throat, the Detective Garda fired one shot at Hennessy from his service revolver. The bullet hit Hennessy in his left shoulder and thereafter ricocheted off his collarbone into an artery, causing massive internal blood loss.

Gardaí then broke the shattered driver's side window with a telescopic baton to gain access to the car, and after searching the vehicle realized that Valdez was not in the car after all. Despite the prompt intervention of medical staff, Hennessy was pronounced dead at the scene at 8:38 pm, without revealing what had happened to Valdez. However, a blood soaked note found in the car had the words "sorry" and "Puck's Castle" written on it. Garda technical teams then downloaded the satnav history of the Qashqai to determine its whereabouts over the previous 36 hours.

== Discovery of Valdez's body ==
North Wicklow
Locations relevant to abduction & murder of Jastine Valdez
1 abduction site, Enniskerry
2 suspect shot dead, Cherrywood Business Park
3 body discovered, Puck's Castle

On the morning of Monday, 21 May 2018, authorities began to search an area known as Puck's Castle in Rathmichael, and soon discovered Valdez's purse and one of her socks. At around 3:30pm, Valdez's fully clothed body was discovered hidden inside thick gorse bushes. A preliminary autopsy at the scene revealed the cause of her death as manual asphyxiation and that the time of death was within the previous 48 hours, which lead Gardaí to believe that Valdez was murdered almost immediately after she was abducted.

The day after the discovery of Valdez's body, a GoFundMe page was set up by a Filipino community group called Outreach Ireland to allow those who wished to offer support and sympathy to the Valdez family to provide financial donations, with the intention to help pay for her funeral and burial expenses (a Filipino tradition known as abuloy). The memorial fund eventually raised over €150,000 from public donations.

Valdez initially lay in repose at a funeral parlour in Bray to allow members of the Filipino community in Ireland to pay their respects. Her parents later released a statement paying tribute to their only daughter, while also expressing gratitude to the Irish emergency services and the local Filipino community for their support during their most traumatic times.

On 31 May 2018, Valdez's body arrived at Clark International Airport in Pampanga, and was then transported by her parents to her home province of Nueva Vizcaya. On 2 July 2018, after lying in repose in her grandmother's home for several weeks (according to tradition), Jastine Valdez was buried in her hometown of Aritao in the Philippines.

Danilo and Teresita Valdez later gave a radio interview to RTÉ where they thanked the people of Ireland for the kindness and generosity in the aftermath of their daughter's murder, while also revealing they discovered an unsent letter in her possessions addressed to them in which Jastine expressed her love to both her parents.

"To my Mom and Dad,

I don't know how to express the word "I love you" right from the bottom of my heart, 'cause words aren't enough to let you know how much I love and care for you. It's hard for me to express but I hope this simple letter of mine is really appreciated and I just want you to know that those words attached here is real. I really mean it.

I'm so lucky that I have you as a part of my life; because of you I have overcome all the trials in my life. Without you my life now would be mess, You're always here to guide, protect and give all what I want. You sacrifice a let for me to live and to be a part of this world. When I lose hope you where there to remind me that mistakes can make you a better person. And you still accept me despite of my failures and weaknesses. A big thank you for the advices to become a good role model in youth and the encouragement to strive harder even though you keep on comparing me to others, just because they are brave enough to face the challenges..

I can't promise but I will give my very best just to finish my studies and have a stable job in the future. I also want to thank him "up there" for giving me the best parents I've ever wanted in You that I will overcome the challenges that will come my way. my life. I will my inspiration aside from God. You were the best parents throughout the whole wide world.

Absolutely "the best", Thank you for everything... I love you so much... But I tell you, I will make you really proud of me, "the worst I can get now, the best I can get in the future."

Your loving daughter,

Jastine"

— contents of an unsent letter from Jastine Valdez addressed to her parents, Danilo and Teresita

== International reactions ==
The tragic circumstances of the murder of Valdez caused widespread shock and revulsion in Ireland, where the abduction of a young woman in broad daylight by a stranger was almost unheard of. A candle lit vigil in her memory was attended by hundreds of people in Enniskerry, while a book of condolence was also opened for people to express their solidarity with the Valdez family. Her murder occurred just days after the murder of another young woman named Ana Kriégel, a 14-year-old who was killed by two other teenagers, who would later become the youngest people ever convicted of murder in Ireland. These deaths led to the Women's Council calling for the government to conduct a review into femicide in Ireland.

Taoiseach of Ireland Leo Varadkar expressed sympathies and condolences on behalf of the Government, as did Fianna Fáil leader Micheál Martin and Sinn Féin president Mary Lou McDonald, to the families of both victims. In response to the attacks on Valdez and Kriégel, Straight Blast Gym owner John Kavanagh, a 4th dan black belt in Brazilian jiu-jitsu who previously trained Conor McGregor, announced he would be providing weekly free women's self-defence classes to anyone who wanted to take part.

Philippines Foreign Affairs Secretary Alan Peter Cayetano released a statement confirming Valdez's death, while also expressing sympathies and offering prayers to family. Valdez's death also caused much anguish and shock in her hometown of Aritao, where many residents followed the case closely on social media. Residents of the town also expressed bewilderment at the randomness of her abduction and murder by a stranger in what was viewed as a traditionally safe Western European country. Hundreds of mourners also visited the family home to view her body lying in an open casket and express sympathy with Valdez's family.

== Subsequent investigations ==
=== Garda enquiries ===
An inquiry determined Hennessy had been shot once in the shoulder which entered his torso, killing him. The Garda Síochána Ombudsman Commission (GSOC) conducted an investigation into the shooting of Mark Hennessy. No prosecution was recommended by the Director of Public Prosecutions. Gardaí investigated Hennessy in relation to other unsolved crimes in Ireland, but his DNA did not match any profiles within the Irish DNA database.

Gardaí sources believed that Hennessy had accumulated debts in the run-up to the murder from binging on alcohol and illegal drugs, and the pressure of hiding his addictions from his unsuspecting family might have tipped him over the edge. Hennessy was also before the courts charged with drunk-driving and leaving the scene of an accident a few days before the murder, adding to the emotional stress he was under. Shortly after the abduction of Valdez, it was reported that Hennessy bought €200 worth of cocaine and then spent the rest of the evening drinking in a pub in Ballybrack. As no previous links between Hennessy and Valdez were ever discovered, Gardaí later theorized that Hennessy was in the middle of a drug-induced manic episode when he spotted Valdez walking on her own, and she was murdered at random as the result of simply being in the wrong place at the wrong time.

=== Coroner's inquest ===
The official inquest into the death of Valdez opened at Dublin Coroner's Court in December 2018. A statement from her father Danilo Valdez was read out to the court, where he described travelling to Dublin City Morgue with his wife Teresita on 22 May 2018 to identify their daughter's remains. The court also heard that the cause of her death was determined to be asphyxia due to manual strangulation after a post-mortem autopsy was conducted by the Deputy State Pathologist. Evidence of bruising and abrasions to the genital area was also discovered, as was a trace amount of cocaine in the toxicology report. The pathologist estimated the time of her death to be sometime on the evening of Saturday, 20 May 2018. Valdez's boyfriend, Joseph Squire, submitted a sworn statement to the inquest stating that she never took drugs and even detested people smoking cigarettes, which raised the possibility that Hennessy had forced her to consume cocaine against her will during her abduction.

Susan Forsyth testified that on the day of Valdez's abduction, she passed a car parked at the side of the road near the Powerscourt Estate shortly after 6 pm, and as she did so she heard the sound of a woman screaming and a man shouting angrily, as well as seeing a woman of Asian appearance making eye contact with her from the boot of the car. As the car drove away at speed she dialed the emergency services to report what she had witnessed. Gareth Thompson also testified that around 10 minutes later on the same day he was driving behind a black Nissan Qashqai, and saw what he thought was a little girl waving to him out the back window with a look of concern on her face. Gardaí based in Bray were immediately dispatched to the scene of the abduction as reported by Susan Forsythe, and discovered a loaf of bread and a smashed mobile phone.

A deposition by Mark Hennessy's wife was read to the court, where she stated that he went to work at 7:30 am as normal in her car on Saturday 20 May 2018, returning in the afternoon before leaving again at 5:25 pm, telling her he was going to the pub to meet a cousin of his. He did not return home that night, and finally answered his phone at 8 am the following morning, stating that he slept in his car at the seafront and would return home soon. She later send a text message to inform him the Gardaí were looking to speak to him in relation to an abduction, but he never replied to her.

The court heard how Gardaí in unmarked cars were conducting searches of car parking areas within a five-mile radius of Bray in an effort to locate the vehicle Valdez was suspected of being abducted in. Two such Garda cars were directed to the Cherrywood Business Park after an alert from a member of the public, arriving shortly after 8 pm. They then spotted Mark Hennessy's black Nissan Qashqai and moved in to detain him. As a Garda tried to open the locked driver door, Hennessy held up a box cutter type knife and suddenly plunged it into his left forearm, slashing it open from the wrist to his elbow in one motion. Seconds later, an armed Garda detective fired a single shot at Hennessy, who then slumped over into the front passenger seat. The Gardaí then quickly opened the doors and searched the vehicle, but did not find Valdez inside.

The Garda detective who opened fire testified that the call he got via police radio reported there was in fact a second occupant in the car, and when he arrived on scene Hennessy was in a very jumpy and agitated state, and it appeared to him that he was struggling with something on the floor of the front passenger seat. The Garda detective stated that he shouted "Armed police, drop the fucking knife !" several times as his colleague tried to open the locked door of the Qashqai, and a few seconds later discharged his weapon at Hennessy as he was convinced Valdez was on the floor of the car and Hennessy was about to slit her throat with the knife. From the angle he was viewing the inside of the car, the Garda detective could see the knife being lowered onto skin, but did not realize Hennessy was actually cutting his own arm. The split second decision to take decisive action was justified in his opinion, as Hennessy was non-compliant to all of the Gardaí demands and the Garda detective believed Valdez was at imminent risk of death; therefore he was left with no other option but to open fire.

== See also ==
- List of kidnappings
