= Tread Softly in This Place =

1972 novel by Brian Cleeve

Tread Softly in this Place
- First edition (US)
- Author: Brian Cleeve
- Language: English
- Publisher: Cassell & Co. (UK); John Day (US)
- Publication date: 1972
- Publication place: United Kingdom
- Media type: Print (Hardback)
- Pages: 316 pp (hardback edition)
- ISBN: 0-304-29090-4
- OCLC: 633168
- Dewey Decimal: 823/.9/14
- LC Class: PZ3.C583 Tp PR6053.L43

Tread Softly in this Place is a novel set in the town of Ross, located in a remote part of rural Ireland, and written over the course of 1970/71 by the Irish-based author, Brian Cleeve. The narrative takes place over four days and charts the interconnecting lives and loves of a disparate collection of characters. Tread Softly in this Place is a further exploration of Irish themes following Cleeve's successful Cry of Morning, although it did not sell as well as the latter.

== Plot summary ==
A year before the novel opens, Peadar and Matty Power, two elderly bachelor brothers, sold a portion of their land to Norwegian fish farmers. However, they resent no longer being able to use the land in question and, one night, they release the entire stock of fish into the sea. In doing so, they set in train a series of events that lead to tragic consequences.

For several years, rumours have been rife in the locality that a major industrial project might be located in Ross. This would be very welcome as there is little local employment there. Now, as news of the act of sabotage at the fish farm spreads through the community, fears grow that subversive elements were behind it and that outside investors will be discouraged.

The local policeman, Sergeant McMenamin, suspects that the Powers released the fish. However, as concern among the locals about a Republican plot develops into virtual paranoia, he is pressured into changing the focus of his investigation. He turns his attention to a small band of local extremists known as The Sons of Ireland. Their leader is a young man who, for patriotic reasons, has Gaelicised his name from Johnny Conroy to Seagrun Ó Maelchonaire.

Several years earlier, Ó Maelchonaire had been part of another Republican group along with a school friend, Michael Carmody. When their activities began to attract police attention, Michael fled to England where he became involved in radical student politics. Now, older and wiser, he has returned to Ross to live a quiet life. He has found a job as a handyman at a local hotel owned by Hubert Kershaw, one of the diminishing number of Protestants still living in Ross. Jenny Kershaw, Hubert's daughter, is in love with Michael and they are developing a relationship, much to her parents' disapproval. The day after the fish were released, Ó Maelchonaire visits Michael at the hotel to persuade him to join The Sons of Ireland. Michael refuses and the two part on bad terms.

Sergeant McMenamin arrests Michael on suspicion of involvement in the fish release. Anxious to establish his credentials as a serious Republican, Ó Maelchonaire and his followers stage an attack on the local gaol in order to free Michael. They take the reluctant escapee to a hiding place in a local wood. As darkness falls, it is clear that Ó Maelchonaire has no idea what to do next and everyone's nerves become fraught. In the late evening, Sir Philip Eagan, a local Protestant aristocrat, stumbles upon the small group while out walking his dog. Thinking that the police have found them, Ó Maelchonaire fires his gun into the darkness, mortally wounding Sir Philip.

Michael manages to escape and makes his way to the hotel and Jenny's room. He tells her what has happened and explains that he must flee Ireland.

In the final chapter, a year has passed, and we learn how the events of those few days have affected all involved. Michael is living in Paris and earning a living as a folk-singer. Ó Maelchonaire is dead, shot by a British soldier on the streets of Belfast. The hotel has been sold to Benedict Mulcahy, a local politician and Government minister. Sir Philip Eagan's estate has been turned into a stud farm.

== Characters in "Tread Softly in this Place" ==
Michael Carmody: Son a local roadmender and former radical student activist who has returned to his home place from England. He works as a general handyman at The Old House Hotel.

Jennifer Kershaw: Young daughter of the proprietor of The Old House Hotel, who is in love with Michael Carmody.

Aloysius "Gombeen" Mulcahy: Aged head of a powerful Catholic family, whose younger son Benedict is a government minister.

Sir Philip Eagan: The leading figure among the remnants of the former Anglo-Irish aristocracy still living in the locality.

Seagrun Ó Maelchonaire: Leader of The Sons of Ireland, a local Republican paramilitary group

== Major themes ==
In Tread Softly in this Place, Cleeve explores the effect of economic and political change on the various strands within the Irish population. The residual Anglo-Irish community, once powerful, try to retain a semblance of their former lives in post-independence Ireland. They fear that the eruption of Republican violence in Northern Ireland will spill into the South and affect their stability and security.

The Catholic majority have risen from their peasant roots to become prosperous and politically powerful. Resentments against their former English masters have not entirely disappeared and there are those like Seagrun Ó Maelchonaire ready to take up the cause of Irish independence once again.

== Literary significance & criticism ==
According to author and critic, Gina McDonald, "At their best his (Brian Cleeve's) Irish works are novels of manners. As such, they capture shifting Irish scenes, interweaving themes and subplots interspersed with social commentary and drawing a variety of vivid character portraits from fanatical communist and radical priest to itinerant tinker, posing artist, real estate tycoon, television commentator, or even small-town girl made good."

In his review of Tread Softly in this Place, noted man of letters, Benedict Kiely, highlighted the author's key strengths: "He has wit and understanding and a gift of phrase. He moves effortlessly from mood to mood from the tender and true to the comic, from a clear view of the past to a sharp view of the present… He follows Gombeen Murphy and Sir Richard Egan into the shadows of death with a technical tour de force of which I am frankly envious."

== Release details ==
- 1971, United Kingdom, Cassell. ISBN 978-0-304-29090-1, Pub date 23 October 1972, Hardback
- 1973, United Kingdom, Corgi ISBN 978-0-552-09376-7, Pub date 23 November 1973, Paperback
- 1973, USA, John Day Co. ISBN 978-0-381-98247-8, Pub date 1973
