= Brian Cleeve =

English writer

- Brian Cleeve in 1962
- Born: Brian Brendon Talbot Cleeve; 22 November 1921; Southend, Essex, England
- Died: 11 March 2003 (aged 81); Shankill, Dublin, Ireland
- Occupations: Writer broadcaster
- Years active: 1945–2001

Brian Brendon Talbot Cleeve (22 November 1921 – 11 March 2003) was a writer, whose published works include twenty-one novels and over a hundred short stories. He was also a broadcaster on RTÉ television. Son of an Irish father and English mother, he was born and raised in England. He lived in South Africa during the early years of National Party rule and was expelled from the country because of his opposition to apartheid. In his early thirties he moved to Ireland where he lived for the remainder of his life. In late middle age he underwent a profound spiritual experience, which led him to embrace mysticism. He developed a model for the spiritual life based on the principle of obedience to the will of God.

== Life and work ==
=== Childhood ===
Brian Cleeve was born in Southend-on-Sea, Essex, the second of three sons to Charles Edward Cleeve and his wife Josephine (née Talbot). Josephine was a native of Essex, where her family had lived for generations. Charles Cleeve, who was born in Limerick, Ireland, was a scion of a famous and wealthy family that ran several successful Irish enterprises in the late-nineteenth and early twentieth centuries. The Cleeves came from Canada originally and emigrated to Ireland in the mid-nineteenth century. As a result of labour troubles and the effects of the Irish Civil War, the Cleeve business failed and Charles moved with his family to England, where Brian was born in 1921.

When he was two-and-a-half, Brian's mother died and his maternal grandparents, Alfred and Gertrude Talbot, took over responsibility for his upbringing. At age eight, Cleeve was sent as a boarder to Selwyn House in Kent, followed at age 12 by three years at St. Edward's School in Oxford. He was by nature a free-thinker and he rejected the assumptions and prejudices that were then part and parcel of upper-middle class English life. His unwillingness to conform meant that school life was very difficult for him, and, in the late summer of 1938, Cleeve decided not to return to St. Edward's for his final year. Instead, he ran away to sea.

=== Early life ===
Cleeve led an eventful life during the next fifteen years. He served on the RMS Queen Mary as a commis waiter for several months. At age 17 he joined the Queen's Own Cameron Highlanders as a private soldier, and, because of his age, just missed being sent to Europe as part of the BEF when World War II broke out. In 1940, he was selected for officer training, was commissioned into the Somerset Light Infantry, and sent to Kenya as a Second lieutenant in the King's African Rifles. A year later he was court-martialled as a result of his objections to the treatment by colleagues of an African prisoner. Stripped of his commission and sentenced to three years' penal servitude, he was transferred to Wakefield Prison in Yorkshire. There, through the intervention of Sir Alexander Paterson, he was offered parole if he agreed to work for British Intelligence. For the remainder of the war he served as a counter-spy in neutral ports such as Lisbon and Dublin. As cover, he worked as an ordinary seaman in the Merchant Navy.

In 1945, Cleeve took an Irish passport and came to Ireland where, in the space of three weeks, he met and married Veronica McAdie. A year later, they left Ireland with baby daughter Berenice on a protracted odyssey that took them to London, Sweden, the West Indies, and finally South Africa. In 1948, the family settled in Johannesburg where Cleeve and his wife set up their own perfume business. A second daughter, Tanga, was born to the couple there in 1953. As a result of his friendship with Fr. Trevor Huddleston, Cleeve witnessed the conditions in which the black and coloured population had to live in townships such as Sophiatown. Cleeve became an outspoken critic of Apartheid, and, in 1954, he was branded by the authorities as a 'political intractable' and ordered to leave South Africa. He returned to Ireland where he lived for the remainder of his life.

=== Literary career ===
Cleeve started writing poems in his teens, a few of which were published in his school paper, the St. Edward's Chronicle. During the war he continued to produce poems of a spiritual or metaphysical nature, most of which were never published. In 1945, he turned to novel-writing. After his first two attempts were rejected, his third novel, The Far Hills, was published in 1952. It is a roman à clef about the first few months of his married life in Dublin. It is also an unflattering picture of the drabness and mean-spiritedness of lower middle class Irish life in the mid-1940s. Two further novels about South Africa followed and their unvarnished descriptions of the reality of life for the native population probably contributed to Cleeve's eventual expulsion from the country.

In the mid-1950s, Cleeve began to concentrate on the short story form. During the next 15 years over 100 of his short stories were published in magazines and periodicals across five continents. He sold nearly 30 to The Saturday Evening Post alone. In 1966, his story Foxer was honoured with a scroll at the annual Edgar Awards.

During the 1960s and 70s, Cleeve returned to writing novels with considerable success. He produced a series of well-received mystery and spy thrillers that did not sacrifice character to plot. One of these, Dark Blood, Dark Terror, was reviewed in the following terms by The Sunday Express: "Dublin author's exciting novel overshadows a man of genius. I am afraid Graham Greene comes off second best". (This was a reference to Greene's The Comedians.)

In 1971, Cleeve published Cry of Morning, his most controversial and successful novel up to that point. It is a panoramic depiction of the economic and social changes that affected Ireland during the 1960s as seen through the eyes of a disparate collection of well-drawn characters. Cleeve subsequently achieved even greater commercial success, especially in the United States, with a number of historical novels featuring a strong female character as protagonist. The first of these, Sara, is set in England during the Napoleonic era and was published in 1975.

Cleeve also wrote several works of non-fiction, principally the Dictionary of Irish Writers. This was a 20-year project to provide to scholars and the general public alike a comprehensive resource on Irish writers at an affordable price. It was a labour of love that consumed a great deal of his time and was effectively subsidised by his more commercial pursuits. The last edition was published in 1985.

=== Television career ===
On 31 December 1961, Telefís Éireann was launched as the Republic of Ireland's first indigenous television station. Cleeve joined the station as a part-time interviewer on the current affairs programme, Broadsheet. In 1964, a new documentary series, Discovery, began with Cleeve as scriptwriter and presenter. The series covered all aspects of Irish life and Cleeve won a Jacobs' Award for his contribution.

In January 1966, Telefís Éireann announced that Cleeve was being dropped as presenter of Discovery because his voice was deemed to be "too light in tone". Many suspected that the real reason was political. Cleeve was told by a colleague that his English accent was felt to be similar to that of the "ascendancy class". This was a reference to the Protestant Ascendancy elite which had governed Ireland up to 1800. An evening newspaper mounted a campaign on Cleeve's behalf and he was soon reinstated.

In September 1966, he joined the new weekly current affairs programme, 7 Days. There, Cleeve and his colleagues set about exposing issues of public interest, much to the dismay of the traditional power structures of big business, the Catholic Church and the political parties. Eventually, external pressure led to the programme coming under tighter editorial control. Cleeve refused to be subject to the new regime and was moved to other less controversial programmes. Telefís Éireann did not renew his contract when it expired in 1973, ironically, just as his last documentary won two awards at the Golden Prague International Television Festival. The documentary, Behind The Closed Eye, focused on the Irish poet Francis Ledwidge who was killed while serving in the British army in Belgium during World War I.

=== Other interests ===
In addition to his literary and broadcasting careers, Cleeve had a lively interest in many other areas.

- While living in South Africa, he took up épée fencing under the Italian master, Ugo Monticelli. Later, in Ireland, he became prominent in the sport's organisation and went on to become Irish champion in 1957 and 1959.
- Shakespeare's Hamlet fascinated him and his thesis on the origin of the tale of the Danish prince led to him receiving his PhD from University College Dublin.
- His interest in languages drew him to the study of Shelta, the secret language of the Irish Traveller people.

=== Spiritual life ===
Raised as an Anglican, Cleeve converted to Roman Catholicism in 1942. In his thirties he became agnostic but continued to pursue his interest in the spiritual dimension of life. In 1977, he began to experience a deep sense of the presence of God and the effect on his life was profound. He all but abandoned his successful literary career and wrote three mystical works that aroused much debate in Ireland. The first of these, The House on the Rock, contains a series of meditations on a wide variety of topics from the nature of good and evil to more secular matters such as politics and nuclear energy. This was followed by The Seven Mansions, which delves deeper into some of the subjects covered in its predecessor. The third book, The Fourth Mary, was published in 1982 and is an account of a branch of the cult of Dionysus that flourished in first century Jerusalem.

When the clamour caused by his spiritual books died down, Cleeve withdrew from the public gaze. He continued to write for a small audience of those who contacted him following publication of The House on the Rock. In 2001, he published a collection of essays on the Internet summarising his spiritual beliefs. In these, he described the steps he believed were necessary for anyone wishing to pursue a spiritual life. They consist of learning to follow God's guidance as an "inner voice" in one's mind, uncovering the past failures that keep one trapped in a negative cycle of self-absorption, and learning the qualities necessary to live as one of God's servants.

=== Final years ===
Following his wife Veronica's death in 1999, Cleeve moved to the village of Shankill, Dublin. His health deteriorated rapidly following a series of small strokes. In November 2001, he married his second wife, Patricia Ledwidge, and she cared for him during his final months.

On 11 March 2003, he died suddenly of a heart attack and his body now lies under a headstone bearing the inscription, 'Servant of God'.

== Bibliography ==
=== Novels ===
- The Far Hills (1952)
- Portrait of My City (1953)
- Birth of a Dark Soul (1954) (also published as The Night Winds)
- Assignment to Vengeance (1961)
- Death of a Painted Lady (1962)
- Death of a Wicked Servant (1963)
- Vote X for Treason (1964) (also published as Counterspy)
- Dark Blood, Dark Terror (1966)
- The Judas Goat (1966) (also published as Vice Isn't Private)
- Violent Death of a Bitter Englishman (1967)
- You Must Never Go Back (1968)
- Exit from Prague (1970) (also published as Escape from Prague)
- Cry of Morning (1971) (also published as The Triumph of O'Rourke)
- Tread Softly in this Place (1972)
- The Dark Side of the Sun (1973)
- A Question of Inheritance (1974) (also published as For Love of Crannagh Castle)
- Sara (1975)
- Kate (1977)
- Judith (1978)
- Hester (1978)
- A Woman of Fortune (1993)

=== Non-Fiction ===
- Dictionary of Irish Writers – Volume 1 (1967)
- Dictionary of Irish Writers – Volume 2 (1970)
- Dictionary of Irish Writers – Volume 3 (1971)
- W.B. Yeats and the Designing of Ireland's Coinage (1972)
- The House on the Rock (1980)
- The Seven Mansions (1980)
- 1938: A World Vanishing (1982)
- The Fourth Mary (1982)
- A View of the Irish (1983)
- Biographical Dictionary of Irish Writers (1985) (with Anne Brady)

=== Radio/TV Plays and Scripts ===
- The Voodoo Dancer (1961)
- Comeback (1962) (with Veronica Cleeve)
- The King of Sunday (1962)
- A Case of Character (1964) (with John Bowen)
- The Girl from Mayo (1969) (with Carolyn Swift)
- You Must Never Go Back (1971) (with Peter Hoar)
- Cry of Morning (1972) (with Peter Hoar)
- Exit from Prague (1972) (with Peter Hoar)

=== Short stories (selected) ===
- Alibi (1947)
- The Eight Kikuyu (1955)
- Passport to Darkness (1956)
- The Salmon of Knowledge (1957)
- The Medal (1961)
- The Panther (1961)
- The Sergeant (1963)
- Foxer (1965)
- The Horse Thieves of Ballysaggert (1966) (Collection)
- The Devil & Democracy (1966)
- First Love (1968)
- Madonna of Rathmines (1969)
- An Arab was the First Gardener (1970)
