= Condensed Milk Company of Ireland =

Former Irish dairy products manufacturer

- Industry: Food processing
- Founded: 1883
- Defunct: 1974
- Fate: Taken over (Branding still used in confectionery as "Cleeve's")
- Successor: Kerry Group
- Headquarters: Limerick, Ireland
- Key people: Sir Thomas Cleeve, founder
- Products: Condensed milk, butter, cheese, toffee
- Number of employees: 3,000

The Condensed Milk Company of Ireland Limited was an Irish manufacturer of dairy products and, at its peak, the largest company of its type operating in the United Kingdom. The firm became best known for Cleeve's Toffee, a confectionery product that proved highly popular and remained on sale in Ireland until the 1980s.

== Origins ==
The business was established in 1883 by Thomas Cleeve, a Canadian of English extraction. Cleeve first came to Ireland as a teenager to work for J. P. Evans & Co., a Limerick-based supplier of agricultural machinery owned by his uncle. Over the next 20 years Cleeve rose to become managing director of this company.

Through his contacts with Irish farmers, Cleeve saw the potential to process milk and manufacture dairy products for home consumption and export. Together with Edmond Russell, a local businessman, and William Beauchamp, a solicitor, Cleeve acquired Lansdowne, a site on the northern bank of the River Shannon. There, the partners set up a factory to produce condensed milk and butter.

== Early history ==
In 1889, the business was incorporated as a private limited company. Within ten years 60,000 tins of condensed milk were being produced daily at its Limerick headquarters, with 10,000 cows providing the raw material. As the business expanded, Thomas Cleeve was joined by his four younger brothers who moved from Canada to help manage the company. They set up or acquired a chain of smaller creameries and factories throughout Munster. Branches were established in London and Liverpool to facilitate sales into the British market.

By the end of the nineteenth century the Condensed Milk Company had 2,000 employees on its payroll and counted 3,000 farmers as suppliers of its raw material. Its exports reached practically every corner of the British Empire. The company's brands included "The Cup", "The Calf", "The Goat", "The Shamrock", and "Cleeve's Full Cream Milk". A separate factory in Limerick manufactured Cleeve's Toffee.

Following the death of chairman Sir Thomas Cleeve in 1908, his brother, Frederick, became managing director, with William Beauchamp assuming the position of chairman. Business grew significantly following the outbreak of World War I in 1914, and employee numbers rose to 3,000. The Condensed Milk Company became a major supplier to British forces fighting in Europe. It was alleged after the war that company profits reached £1m during this period.

== Industrial and civil strife ==
In 1917, the Irish Transport and General Workers' Union set up three branches in Limerick. Within a year the union had successfully recruited the Cleeve workforce as members. In 1919, the short-lived Limerick Soviet brought the company's headquarters at Lansdowne to a standstill. Even though normal business resumed at the factory, the stoppage was a turning point in the Cleeves' fortunes. Over the course of the next three years, the company faced an unprecedented array of challenges which threatened the continued viability of the business.

Following the resumption of peace in Europe, the price of milk fell dramatically affecting company profits. On top of that, the War of Independence led to considerable damage being inflicted on many of the company's factories and creameries. Some of this damage was caused by Crown forces, despite the Cleeves being staunch Unionists. Other instances were seemingly the work of Irish Nationalists who saw the Condensed Milk Company as a symbol of British rule. The third challenge faced by the company lay in the radicalisation of sections of its workforce.

For instance, in May 1920 at Knocklong, County Limerick, the workers decided to escalate a pay dispute by taking over the company's creamery in the town. They hoisted a red flag over the premises and erected a banner across the entrance which read "Knocklong Soviet Creamery, we make butter not profits." The Cleeves conceded defeat after five days and granted retrospective wage increases to the workers. The success of the workers at Knocklong precipitated similar disputes at other Cleeve factories.

By November 1923, the directors decided they could not continue and announced that the company was going into liquidation. Frederick Cleeve had stepped down as managing director several years earlier and was replaced by Sir Thomas Cleeve's son, Francis. The company was bought as a going concern by a syndicate of local businessmen led by Andrew O'Shaughnessy, a member of Dáil Éireann. Francis Cleeve remained on as managing director for another year to facilitate the transition.

== Decline ==
Lansdowne factory, June 2005

In 1927, the Free State government established a new semi-state body, the Dairy Disposal Company, to regularise and rationalise the industry. The new body took over the Condensed Milk Company, by far the largest producer in the country, as well as other smaller concerns. The company continued to operate under State control until the early 1970s. At that stage, the government decided to break up the Dairy Disposal Company and transfer ownership of the creameries to a number of farmer co-operatives. In 1974, most of what remained of the Condensed Milk Company was sold to one of these, Golden Vale, subsequently a subsidiary of the Kerry Group.

The final remnant of the original family business, Cleeve's Toffee, continued until 1985 when the company which had purchased the brand was liquidated.

== Site redevelopment ==
Kerry Group ceased all production and the 10-acre site was acquired by Limerick 2030 which has appointed a design team to redevelop the site as Cleeves Riverside Quarter. Its tall chimney remains as one of Limerick's most distinctive landmarks.

As at June 2025, the plan is for "230 homes and 270 purpose-built student rooms", plus 300m^{2} of commercial space along with other features.

== See also ==
- Brian Cleeve
