= Judith (novel) =

1978 novel by Brian Cleeve

- Hardback first edition 1978
- Author: Brian Cleeve
- Language: English
- Genre: Historical novel
- Publisher: Cassell & Co. (UK); Coward-McCann (US)
- Publication date: 1978
- Publication place: United Kingdom
- Media type: Print (hardback)
- Pages: 299 pp (hardback edition)
- ISBN: 0-304-30002-0
- OCLC: 4667095
- Dewey Decimal: 823/.9/14
- LC Class: PZ3.C583 Ju 1978b PR6053.L43

Judith is the third in a series of historical novels set in late 18th-century England written by the Ireland-based author Brian Cleeve. Like its predecessors, Judith features as its protagonist a young independent-minded woman who tries to make her way in a largely inhospitable and sometimes terrifying world. First published in 1978, it was among Cleeve's most financially successful novels, especially in the United States.

== Plot summary ==
It is 1799 and eighteen-year-old Judith Mortimer lives with her widowed father, Jonathan, on their 400-acre (1.6 km^{2}) farm in Essex. Jonathan Mortimer has devoted his adult life, and most of his money, to writing and publishing lengthy treatises on various subjects close to his heart. None has found favour with the reading public and, consequently, he and his daughter are close to penury. Several years earlier, Mortimer suffered a stroke and is confined to bed where he works on his latest project, A Treatise on Just Government.

Meanwhile, his increasingly desperate daughter tries to find ways to keep the small household, including two servants, financially viable. She has entered into an agreement with a band of local smugglers to allow them use the farm's outhouses to store their merchandise. In return, the smugglers pay her ten to fifteen guineas each time they use the farm for their illegal purposes.

Jonathan Mortimer is first cousin to a local earl and powerful landowner to whom he is in considerable debt. The debt arises from a legal dispute concerning their mutual grandfather's will. The earl wishes to buy the Mortimers' farm, which adjoins his own larger estate, and thereby clear their indebtedness to him. Under the proposed arrangement, Jonathan Mortimer will be allowed to live out his remaining days on the farm. Furthermore, the earl offers to give Judith a generous dowry so that she can marry. However, the catch is that she must marry the odious Mr. Massingham. She refuses the offer

Robert Barnabas, son of the smugglers' leader, is in love with Judith and, during one of his nocturnal visits to the farm, he makes his feelings clear. Judith's emotions are thrown into turmoil by the handsome young man's directness. She learns that he was studying to be a doctor but abandoned it under pressure from his father to join the family 'business'. Now, as his love for Judith brings meaning to his life, he resolves to turn away from smuggling and complete his medical training.

Not long after her refusal of the earl's offer, Judith's father dies. At the same time, news of her involvement with the smugglers reaches the local militia. She is forced to flee to London with Evergreen, an orphan gypsy girl whom she has taken into her care. There, the two young women unwittingly fall into the clutches of Mrs. Ware, who runs an 'academy' for young girls. Ostensibly set up to teach its occupants how to be ladies, Mrs. Ware's academy is, in reality, a high class brothel.

Robert Barnabas pursues Judith to London and rescues her from Mrs. Ware's establishment. However, Massingham, furious and humiliated at Judith's refusal of his proposal of marriage, has also come to London seeking revenge. Together with his henchmen, he seizes Judith in the street and brings her to a lunatic asylum. There she is incarcerated for months in appalling conditions, naked and shackled in a cold cell. Massingham pays the asylum keeper to hold Judith until he feels she has learned her lesson. Eventually she is released onto the streets of London, her sanity barely intact and with nowhere to go.

She is 'adopted' by a street urchin who takes her back to his filthy hovel. Each day she is forced by her new companion to beg on the streets. After several more months of dreadful hardship, Judith is taken in by a kindly young Christian woman, Miss Westmoreland. Slowly Judith begins to recover her mental and physical health and a strong bond of friendship forms between the two women.

Through Judith, Miss Westmoreland learns of the appalling conditions in which London's poor live. She resolves to set up an orphanage and hospital to care for abandoned children. The two women raise the necessary funds and advertise for a doctor to run their new enterprise. One of the applicants is the now-qualified Dr. Robert Barnabas.

Reunited at last, Barnabas and Judith are soon married. They return to Essex to live on the Mortimer farm. It transpires that the dispute over her great-grandfather's will has been settled in her favour and the farm is now hers.

== Characters in "Judith" ==
Judith Mortimer: A nineteen-year-old girl who struggles to keep her home from falling into the hands of her nefarious relatives.

Jonathan Mortimer: Judith's ailing father who has neglected the family farm to pursue his scholarly writings.

Robert Barnabas: A smuggler who loves Judith and who turns his back on his illegal trade to become a doctor.

Francis Mortimer: Judith's cousin and childhood sweetheart.

Evergreen: A poor orphan gypsy girl whom Judith takes under her wing.

Mr. Massingham: An older man who lusts after Judith and who puts financial pressure on her to marry him.

Miss Westmoreland: A young Christian woman who rescues Judith from the streets.

== Major themes ==
Judith is concerned with the difficulties faced by women in a hierarchical society dominated by men. Because the heroine makes it clear that she will not conform to society's rigid rules, those who enforce those rules try to break her spirit.

Through Judith's experiences in late nineteenth-century London, the reader is confronted with the horrific reality faced by those who lack the privileges of position and money.

The religious hypocrisy of the time is also exposed. Mr. Carteret, the local vicar, arrives at the Mortimer farm to take Evergreen to the workhouse. When Judith refuses to give her up, the vicar loses his temper.

'Do you dare to teach me my task?' Mr. Carteret whispered. 'I am the guardian of my flock, and these people - she is a gipsy, she has been described to me. They are evil! Criminal by birth. They steal and poison. They are like a sickness wherever they go.'

== Literary significance & criticism ==
According to author and critic, Gina McDonald, "Cleeve brings to history and romance a social conscience and raises questions of social justice, national character, and personal responsibility."

== Release details ==
- 1978, United Kingdom, Cassell, Hardback
- 1978, USA, Coward, McCann & Geoghegan, Hardback
- 1979, United Kingdom, Hodder & Stoughton Ltd., Paperback
- 1979, USA, Berkley Publishing Corporation, Paperback
