= Sandy Smith (cricketer) =

Irish cricketer

Personal information
- Full name: Alexander Victor Smith
- Born: 11 May 1945 (age 81); Shankill, Leinster, Ireland
- Nickname: Sandy
- Batting: Left-handed
- Bowling: Right-arm medium

Domestic team information
- Years: Team
- 1978–1979: Ireland

Career statistics
Competition	First-class
Matches	2
Runs scored	11
Batting average	–
100s/50s	0/0
Top score	11*
Catches/stumpings	1/–
- Source: Cricinfo, 2 November 2018

Alexander 'Sandy' Victor Smith (born 11 May 1945) is a former Irish first-class cricketer.

Smith was born at Shanganagh near Shankill, and was educated in Bray at Woodbrook College. Playing his club cricket for Pembroke, he made his debut for Ireland in a minor match against Wales at Swansea in 1977. The following year he made his debut in first-class cricket, when Ireland played Scotland at Glasgow. The following season, he made a second first-class appearance against the touring Sri Lankans at Eglinton. He continued to play club cricket for Pembroke into the 1980s. Outside of cricket, his profession was an accountant.
