= The Far Hills =

Book by Brian Cleeve

- Hardback first edition 1952
- Author: Brian Cleeve
- Language: English
- Genre: Novel
- Publisher: Jarrold's
- Publication date: 1952
- Publication place: United Kingdom
- Media type: Print (hardback)
- Pages: 238 pp (hardback edition)

The Far Hills was the first of Irish author Brian Cleeve's novels to be published. Written when he lived in South Africa, it is a roman à clef about his time in Dublin immediately after World War II. The novel paints an unflattering picture of lower middle-class life in Ireland's capital city in the mid-1940s. Cleeve wrote The Far Hills following his failure to find a publisher for his previous novel on the subject of ancient Crete. Because of its sexual content, The Far Hills was banned in Ireland under the strict censorship laws then in force.

== Plot summary ==
The novel focuses on the McDonald family, who live a hand-to-mouth existence following their abandonment by paterfamilias, the feckless Rory McDonald. Into their lives comes Brendan Courtney O’Brien, scion of a wealthy Irish family, who has fallen in love with the eldest of the McDonald children, Erika. Despite his background, Brendan has even less money than the McDonalds. As the black sheep of his family, he has lived a peripatetic life and scrapes a living buying and selling on the black market.

Through Brendan's eyes we meet a succession of apparently aimless losers who hang around the decrepit hair-dressing salon which is the McDonald's only source of income.

Erika's younger brother, Jimmy, is something of a rebel, always getting into trouble. Eventually, his desperate mother sends him to a boarding school from which he escapes at the first opportunity. He wanders the byroads of rural Ireland before being recaptured.

Soon, Brendan and Erika's wedding takes place, followed by a reception in McDonald's salon. As Brendan surveys the guests, all relatives or friends of his new bride, he imagines how his own estranged family would see them.

The knives held like pencils. The ill-fitting suits. The faces. It was odd how you could tell a man’s background from his face. There was no poise about these faces. No poise and no swagger. None of the swagger of sailors in a fo’c’sle or men driving big trucks. Men who didn’t give a curse for God or man. None of the poise of men born to authority. Only a grey, frightened middleness. Afraid of poverty. Afraid of other people. Even afraid of the wealth they were greedy for. Afraid to spend it. Afraid to enjoy it.

Brendan and Erika set up home in a boarding house run by a malicious old landlady. In a bid to escape the grinding poverty in which they languish, the young couple join a travelling circus. Erika becomes a fortune-teller and Brendan sells small bottles of perfume to which he has added astrological predictions.

Meanwhile, young Jimmy has run away again and, serendipitously, ends up in the same circus in which his sister and brother-in-law are working. The three meet just as Jimmy is about to receive retribution from a hot-dog man whose wares he has stolen. Brendan rescues him and all three return to Dublin.

Erika's mother has sold the hairdressing salon and is about to leave for England with her younger son. Brendan and Erika decide to join her, with Jimmy in tow. The novel ends just as their ship is leaving the dockside. However, one of the party is missing. Jimmy has decided to stay in Ireland and, as the ship sails out into Dublin Bay, he watches from the pier before turning to find his own destiny somewhere in "the far hills".

== Main characters in "The Far Hills" ==
Erika McDonald: Fun-loving eldest daughter of the family who wants to make a better life for herself.

Kathleen McDonald: Erika's mother who tries to keep the family together after her husband leaves her.

Jimmy McDonald: Erika's delinquent younger brother who, even more than his sister, wants to escape the relentless misery of their lives.

Tady Ryan: One of the locals who hangs around the hairdressing salon. He enjoys spreading malicious gossip and needling the others, while conveying an impression of selfless concern.

Brendan Courtney O'Brien: The ex-public schoolboy who is estranged from his family and who has fallen on hard times.

One of the subsidiary characters, Sheila, is a coloured girl who is having an affair with a (white) married man. Such a mixed-race relationship was in breach of South Africa's Apartheid laws, under which the author was living when he wrote the novel.
