= Thomas Cleeve =

Canadian businessman (1844–1908)

Sir Thomas Cleeve
- Sir Thomas Cleeve
- Born: 5 June 1844; Cleveland, Canada East, Province of Canada
- Died: 19 December 1908 (aged 64); Limerick, County Limerick, Ireland
- Occupation: Businessman

Sir Thomas Henry Cleeve (5 June 1844 – 19 December 1908) was a Canadian-born businessman, domiciled in Ireland, who was elected High Sheriff of Limerick City on three occasions.

== Background ==
Thomas Cleeve was born in Cleveland in Canada East, and was the eldest son of Edward Elmes Cleeve, an English immigrant, and Sophia Journeaux, whose family came from Ireland.

== Business career ==
In 1860, Thomas Cleeve travelled to Ireland to stay with his mother's relatives who ran an agricultural machinery business in Limerick known as J.P. Evans & Company. Young Thomas decided to remain in Ireland and eventually assumed control of the business.

In 1883, Cleeve started a new enterprise, the Condensed Milk Company of Ireland, in conjunction with two local businessmen. The company manufactured dairy products, such as condensed milk, butter, cheese and confectionery. Its headquarters were located in Limerick city, on the northern bank of the River Shannon. The business expanded over the next 20 years to become the largest of its type in the United Kingdom.

Cleeve was also senior partner in the Cleeve Canning and Cold Storage Company based in British Columbia.

He was the President of Limerick Chamber in 1908–09.

== Public office ==
In 1899, Cleeve was voted on to Limerick City Council. That same year, his fellow councillors elected him as High Sheriff of Limerick City, the Queen's representative in the city. He held the position again in 1907 and 1908.

In 1900, following a visit to Ireland by Queen Victoria, Cleeve received a knighthood from the Lord Lieutenant of Ireland.

== Final illness ==
In December 1908, Cleeve was taken ill at a public function. Despite undergoing surgery, he died of peritonitis a few days later at the age of 64. According to contemporary newspaper reports his funeral was one of the largest seen in Limerick city, with crowds lining the streets up to an hour before the cortège passed. He is buried in the churchyard of St. Mary's Cathedral in the city.

== Family ==
Cleeve married Phoebe Agnes Dann in 1874 and they had five children. The author and broadcaster Brian Cleeve was a grand-nephew of Sir Thomas Cleeve.
