= Stephen Quin =

Irish merchant and public official

Sir Stephen Byrne Quin DL JP (26 December 1860 – May 1944) was an Irish wine merchant and public official in Limerick.

== Biography ==
Quin was born in Limerick, the son of John Quin (born 1813), the founder of John Quin & Co. wine merchants. Quin was raised as a Roman Catholic and educated at Ushaw College, Durham. He later inherited his father's business and became the company director.

By 1891, he had become a justice of the peace in Limerick. He served two terms as High Sheriff of Limerick City in 1897 and 1898. He was also a deputy lieutenant of Limerick. Politically, he was initially a moderate nationalist supporter of the Irish Parliamentary Party, but became increasingly associated with unionism over the course of his career. He was recorded as the only unionist elected to the Limerick Corporation in 1914. Following the Easter Rising in April 1916, Quin played a leading role in organising the disarmament of Irish Volunteers in Limerick alongside Bishop O'Dwyer. He acted as an intermediary, receiving surrendered weapons from Michael Colivet before passing these on to the British Army garrison in the city. Between 1916 and 1918, he served as Mayor of Limerick. His public role and political position as a pragmatic Catholic unionist resulted in Quin being chosen as a representative to the Irish Convention in Dublin from 1917 to 1918. He was knighted in the 1918 New Year Honours.

Quin moved to England during the Irish War of Independence, purchasing a house at Swinley Forest in South Ascot.
