= High Sheriff of Limerick City =

Sovereign's judicial representative

The High Sheriff of Limerick City was the Sovereign's judicial representative in the city of the City of Limerick. Initially an office for lifetime, assigned by the Sovereign, the High Sheriff became annually appointed from the Provisions of Oxford in 1258. Besides his judicial importance, he had ceremonial and administrative functions and executed High Court Writs. The office was abolished in 1920 on the formation of the Irish Free State.

== High Sheriffs of Limerick City ==
=== 16th century ===
- 1500 John Everard; Richard Fitz-Nicholas Creagh
- 1501 Robert Stackpol; Edmond Comyn
- 1502 Richard Harrold; Thomas Cromwell
- 1503 Robert Roche; Nicholas Bonevyle
- 1504 Nicholas Lawless; Nicholas Fitz-John Arthur; John Lewis or Lawless
- 1505 Nicholas Creagh; Nicholas Rochford
- 1506 Rhicard Whyte; Richard Sergeant
- 1507 Nicholas Harold; Nicholas Ryce
- 1508 Thomas Yong; Richard Sergeant
- 1509 David Comyn; Richard Boneovle
- 1510 Walter Rice; Richard Fanning
- 1511 Patrick Fanning; Thomas Rochfort
- 1512 David Whyte; Peter Comyn
- 1513 James Stretch; Christopher Harrold
- 1514 Christopher Creagh; James Fitz-Edward Arthur
- 1515 William Long; William Arthur
- 1516 Richard Milonis (Fitz-Milo) Arthur; Galfridus Stretch
- 1517 James Harrold; Peter Walter Arthur
- 1518 George Stretch; Peter Fitz-William Creagh
- 1519 Edmond Harrold; Daniel Fitz-John Arthur
- 1520 Stephen Creagh; Thomas Woulfe
- 1521 William Fanning; Andrew Harrold
- 1522 John Ryce; Thomas Arthur
- 1523 James Creagh; Stephen Comyn
- 1524 Peter Creagh; Patrick Everard
- 1525 Richard Comyn; Patrick Everard
- 1526 Nicholas Fitz-Thomas Creagh; John Nangyll
- 1527 John Fitz-Nicholas Arthur; Peter Fitz-Christopher Arthur
- 1528 William Creagh; Leonard Creagh
- 1529 Nicholas Comyn; Patrick Long
- 1530 William Verdun; Richard Stackpol
- 1531 John Harrold; Roland Arthur
- 1532 George Creagh; William White
- 1533 David Ryce; Thomas Long
- 1534 Bartholomew Stretch; John Fitz-John Stretch
- 1535 Dominick Whyte; Oeunepherous Fitz-Christopher Arthur
- 1536 John Comyn; Jasper Fanning
- 1537 William Yong; Patrick Ryce
- 1538 James Fox; James Roche
- 1539 William Stretch; Thomas Creagh
- 1540 David Creagh; James Loftus
- 1541 Walter Harold; Dominick Comyn
- 1542 William Stretch; James Stackpol
- 1543 William Creagh; William Yong
- 1544 Andrew Harrold; Hector Fitz-James Arthur
- 1545 Patrick Long; George Rochfort
- 1546 William Verdun; Myles Stretch
- 1547 Thomas Arthur; John Stackpol
- 1548 Peter Whyte; James Creagh
- 1549 John Harrold; Christopher Creagh
- 1550 James Stretch; Edward Fitz-Daniel Arthur
- 1551 Clement Fanning; Nicholas Harrold
- 1552 Roland Harold; Philip Rochford
- 1553 Nicholas Whyte; John Creagh
- 1554 William Fox; Richard Fanning
- 1555 David Comyn; Thomas Creagh
- 1556 Peter Fitz-Leonard Creagh; George Roche
- 1557 Richard Arthur; John Everard
- 1558 Stephen Whyte; Dominick Creagh
- 1559 Dominick Fanning; Thomas Fitz-Peter Creagh
- 1560 Thomas Fitz-Patrick Creagh; Richard Young
- 1561 Patrick Rochford; David Cromwell
- 1562 Nicholas Woulfe; Patrick Fox
- 1563 John Comyn; John Fanning
- 1564 George Fanning; Thomas Harrold
- 1565 Patrick Creagh; William Creagh
- 1567 James Creagh; John Wolfe
- 1568 Thomas Fitz-Arthur; Richard Cromwell
- 1569 Nicholas Price; Stephen Whyte
- 1570 Dominick Everard; Daniel Fitz-David Arthur
- 1571 George Fitz-Daniel Arthur; George Comyn
- 1572 Philip Comyn; Jordan Roche
- 1573 Thomas Stretch; Milo Fitz-Eustace Arthur
- 1574 George Cromwell; Nicholas Whyte
- 1575 Stephen Fitz-Dominick Whyte; David Rochfort
- 1576 William Fitz-John Arthur; Patrick Fanning
- 1577 Walter Fitz-Patrick Ryan; Nicholas Stretch
- 1578 John Stretch; Peter Stretch
- 1579 Thomas Stretch; Arthur Creagh
- 1580 Andrew Creagh; Edward Fitz-Hector Arthur
- 1581 Thomas Yong; George Harrold
- 1582 Peter Fitz-Dominick Creagh; Peter Oenopherous Arthur
- 1583 Oliver Harrold; Nicholas Bourke
- 1584 Nicholas Harrold; Patrick Midchell
- 1585 Patrick Woulfe; Oliver Bourke
- 1586 Robert Whyte; James Cromwell
- 1587 Stephen Roche; Edmond Comyn
- 1588 Martin Creagh (died); Walter Ryce and Patrick Woulf
- 1589 William Fitz-William Creagh; Thomas Stackpol
- 1590 Thomas Woulf; Nicholas Fox
- 1591 Edmond Fox; Richard Woulfe
- 1592 John Fitz-Andrew Comyn de Parke; David Woulfe
- 1593 Bartholomew Fitz-Jas. Stretch; Ed. Fitz-Stephen Whyte
- 1594 Dom. Fitz-John Arthur; Edward Stretch
- 1595 John Fitz-John Stretch; Clement Fanning
- 1596 Bartholomew Stackpol; Robert Bourke
- 1597 William Fitz-Thos.Arthur; James Fitz-Stephen Whyte
- 1598 Philip Roche; Thomas Bourke
- 1599 David Fitz-Nicholas Whyte; Michael Waters

=== 17th century ===
- 1600 Simon Fanning; Robert Arthur
- 1601 William Fitz-Thomas Stretch; James Fitz-Edward Arthur; David Fitz-Walter Ryce
- 1602 James Fitz-James Whyte; William Myeagh
- 1603 Thomas Fitz-Philip Comyn; Thomas Fitz-Patrick Creagh
- 1604 David Fitz-Milo Comyn; Thomas Fitz Patrick Creagh
- 1605 Dominick Fitz-Peter Creagh; James Woulf
- 1606 Christopher Arthur; P. Creagh
- 1607 Nicholas Whyte; William Hally
- 1608 William Creagh; George White.
- 1609 William Myeagh; Dominick Creagh
- 1610 Walter Whyte; Jasper Whyte
- 1611 David Fitz-Geoffrey Ryce, (2 months); Christopher Creagh
- 1612 Patrick Fitz-Henry Whyte; John Skeolan
- 1613 John FitzJohn Arthur; George Woulfe
- 1614 Nicholas Fitz-Nicholas Stretch; William Roch de Cahiravahalla
- 1614 William Rochford; Peter Fitz-Peter Creagh
- 1614 Thomas Power; Arthur Fanning; Christopher Fitz- D. Arthur
- 1615 James White Fitz-Henry; Walter Fitz-Richard Arthur
- 1615 George Sexten; George Rochford
- 1615 Nicholas Fitz-Henry Whyte; George Rochford
- 1616 James Fitz-John Stretch; George Rochford
- 1616 John Fitz-John Stretch; Richard Lawless
- 1617 George Fitz-James Creagh; Peter Harrold
- 1618 Edward Sexten; David Roch
- 1619 Edward Sexten; Philip Ronane
- 1620
- 1621 James Lawless; Robert Lawless
- 1622 Peter Harrold; Philip Ronane
- 1623 George Fitz-James Creagh; Patrick Lawless
- 1624 James Sexten; Edward Barkley
- 1625 Nicholas Fanning; John Meyeagh
- 1626 James Fitz-Bw. Stackpol; George Bourke
- 1627 Andrew Fitz-Andrew Creagh; Peter Fitz-Oliver Harrold
- 1628 Dominick Fitz-Bw. Whyte; Edward Skeolane
- 1629 Peter Fitz-Andrew Creagh; William Fitz-Stephen Roch
- 1630 Stephen Fitz-James Whyte; Robert Hally
- 1631 Stephen Stretch; Dominick Tyrry
- 1632 James Fitz-Stephen Whyte; Francis Fanning
- 1633 James Fitz-Ed Fox; Peter Fitz-Peter Creagh
- 1634 John Fitz-Thomas Bourk; William Fitz-Peter Creagh
- 1635 Daniel Nihell; James Fitz-Water Ryce
- 1636 Luke Stretch; William Leyseaght
- 1637 James Fitz-John Creagh; James Hackett
- 1638 James Fitz-David Whyte; Nicholas Fitz-Ed. Fox
- 1639 David Fitz-David Whyte; William Fitz-William Stretch
- 1640 John Fitz-Jasper Comyn; Henry Cassy
- 1641 Thomas fitz-James Whyte; George Fitz-Patrick Rochfort
- 1642 Laurence Whyte; Laurence Ryce
- 1643 Thomas Fitz-David Comyn; James Sanfield
- 1644 James Mahowne; Patrick Meyeagh
- 1645 Thomas Fitz-Patrick Stretch; Edmund Fritz-Stephen Roch
- 1646 David Fitz-Peter Creagh; James Fitz-George Sexten
- 1647 Bartholomew Fitz-David Ryce; Patrick Woulfe
- 1648 Patrick Fitz-Oliver Arthur; Andrew Bourk
- 1649 David Rochefort; James Bonefield
- 1650 Martin Fitz-Andrew Creagh; Nicholas Ronan
- 1651 Stephen Fitz-David Skeolan; William Fitz-David Creagh
- 1656 John Comyn; Peter Ash
- 1657 John Comyn; Peter Ash
- 1658 Jeremy Heywood; Christopher Keyes
- 1659 Robert Passy; John Crabb
- 1660 Henry Price; Robert Shutt
- 1661 James Banting; William Pope
- 1662 Henry Salfield; William Joint
- 1663 Thomas Martin; John Burn
- 1664 John Lence; Samuel Foxon
- 1665 Henry Price; John Symmes
- 1666 John Backner; John Arthur
- 1667 William York; Anthony Bartlett
- 1668 Edward Clock; John Bennett
- 1669 Rowland Bonton; Henry Clinton
- 1670 Francis Whittamor; George Bockendoght
- 1671 Daniel Hignett; John Hart
- 1672 John Beer; John Halpin
- 1673 Robert Higgins; Bartholomew Ast.
- 1674 Thomas Rose; Robert Smith
- 1675 George Roche; William Craven
- 1676 Pierce Graham; Edward Waight
- 1677 Richard Lyllis; Wm. Clifford
- 1678 Thomas Long; John Bond
- 1679 William Allen; Moses Woodroff
- 1680 Richard Ingram; Thomas Meagher
- 1681 John Craven; Nathaniel Webb
- 1682 Edward Clark; Giles Spencer
- 1683 Richard Allen; John Ford
- 1684 Daniel Bowman; Simon White
- 1685 Thomas Breveter; Samuel Bartlett
- 1686 John Young; James Robinson
- 1687 Thomas Harrold; Peter Monsell
- 1688 Francis White; Philip Stackpole
- 1689 Thomas Creagh; Richard Harrold
- 1690 James Arthur; Nicholas Morrough
- 1691 John Young; James Robinson
- 1692 Zachary Holland; Bartholomew Lee
- 1693 Wm. Davis; Abraham Bowman
- 1694 Henry Chaplain; Charles Atkins
- 1695 Richard Sexten; George Roche
- 1696 John Vincent; Pierse Piersy
- 1697 Thomas Flaxon; John Higgins
- 1698 Tock Roche; Raudal Holland
- 1699 Richard Craven; Ezechias Holland

=== 18th century ===
- 1700: Walter Parker; George Robinson
- 1701:
- 1708: Francis Sargent;
- 1714: Benjamin Barrington
- 1715:
- 1720: John Graves;
- 1721:
- 1729:Benjamin Barrington
- 1730:
- 1734: Peter Sargent;
- 1735: Richard Graves;James Sargent
- 1736: Henry Long;
- 1737:
- 1743: Henry Ievers;
- 1744:
- 1747: Francis Sargent;
- 1757: William Goggin;
- 1758:
- 1761: Francis Sargent;
- 1765: Francis Sargent;
- 1775: William Fitzgerald; William Gabbett
- 1776: Christopher Knight; Thomas Vincent
- 1777: Charles Sargent; Francis Russell.
- 1778: John Gabbett; Amos Vereker.
- 1779: Hugh Gough, John Harrison.
- 1780: Edward Parker; John Ferrar
- 1781: William Fosbery; John Frederick Furnell
- 1782: Georgc Tomkins; Hugh Brady.
- 1783: John Fitzgerald; William Russell
- 1784: William Wallace; Michael Blood
- 1785: Joseph Sargent; Arthur Vincent.
- 1786: William Piercy; Henry Rose.
- 1787: Robert Wallace; Samuel Hunter.
- 1788: John Cripps; William Hunt.
- 1789: Henry D'Esterre; Thomas Moroney.
- 1790: John Augustine Ievers; Bryan M'Mahon.
- 1791: George Sargeant; David Dwyer.
- 1792; Ralph Westrop; Henry Brady.
- 1793: George Davis; Thomas Edwards.
- 1794: Robert Briscoe; Joseph Cripps.
- 1795: Nicholas Mahon; Frederick Price.
- 1796: Robert Briscoe; Andrew Watson.
- 1797: Francis Lloyd; Richard Webb.
- 1798: Andrew Watson; Henry Pierce Carroll.
- 1799: Francis Lloyd; Richard Webb

=== 19th century ===
- 1800: Philip Russell; Henry Collis.
- 1801: Edward Moroney; Thos. E. Wilkinson.
- 1802: Abraham Russell; Henry Collis.
- 1803: Henry Pierce Carroll; Colclough Stritch.
- 1804: Henry Pierce Carroll; Colclough Stritch.
- 1805: Ab. Colclough Strich; Bryan M'Mahon.
- 1806: Henry Pierce Carroll; D. F. G. Mahony.
- 1807: Edmond Morony; Thomas Westropp.
- 1808: Edmond Morony; Thomas Westropp
- 1809: Edmond Morony; Thomas Westropp
- 1810: Edmond Morony; Thomas Westropp
- 1811: D. F. G. Mahony; Henry Watson.
- 1812: Henry Collis; Arthur Brereton.
- 1813: Henry Collis; Arthur Brereton.
- 1814: Henry Collis; Arthur Brereton
- 1815: Henry Collis; Arthur Brereton
- 1816: Henry Collis; Arthur Brereton
- 1817: Henry Collis; Arthur Brereton
- 1818: W. M. Jackson; J. M'Al. Taverner
- 1819: W. M. Jackson; William Taylor.
- 1820: W. M. Jackson; William Taylor.
- 1821: W. Taylor; Andrew James Watson.
- 1822: W. Taylor; Andrew James Watson
- 1823: John Piercy; Henry Rose
- 1824: William Hunt; William Piercy
- 1825: John Harrison; John Westropp
- 1826: A. J. Watson; Richard Franklin Jnr.
- 1827: John S. T. Piercy; Edmond Moroney Jnr.
- 1828: William Gibson; John Standish.
- 1829: William Piercy; George Lloyd.
- 1830: Andrew James Watson: Henry Mahon.
- 1831: Edmond Moroney; Ralph Westropp Brereton.
- 1832: Richard Franklin; George Sexton.
- 1833: William Piercy; Samuel Moore Watson.
- 1834: George Lloyd: Francis Philip Russell.
- 1835: Edmond Moroney jnr.; Ralph W. Brereton
- 1836: Henry Mahon; Hughes Russell.
- 1837: Richard Franklin; Henry Vereker.
- 1838: George Lloyd; James Sexton.
- 1839: Robert Hunt; Thomas F. G. Sexton.
- 1840: Ralph Westropp Brereton; Thomas Lloyd.
- 1841: Robert Ringrose Gelston; Arthur V. Warson.
- 1842: Dr. Gelston.
- 1843: John Norrls Russell.
- 1844: Samuel Dickson.
- 1845: William Roche.
- 1846: Henry Watson.
- 1847: Richard Russell.
- 1848: Henry Maunsell
- 1849: David Leahy Arthur.
- 1850: William Spaight of Derry Castle.
- 1851: P. A. Shannon.
- 1852: William Gabbett
- 1853: Sir James Spaight, J.P., D.L
- 1854: Major George Gavin.
- 1855: Francis Grene
- 1856: Helenus White.
- 1857: Captain Michael Gavin.
- 1858: Thomas Kane, M.D.
- 1859: Andrew V. Watson.
- 1860: Edward Murphy.
- 1861: Thompson Russell.
- 1862: Robert Hunt.
- 1863: Thorns Boyse
- 1864: H. C. Vereker.
- 1865: John Thomas M'Sheehy.
- 1866: Eugene O'Callaghan.
- 1867: Eugene O'Callaghan.
- 1868: Lawrence Quinlivan.
- 1869: John Quin.
- 1870: John MacDonnell.
- 1871: John MacDonnell.
- 1872: John Howley.
- 1873: Michael Robert Ryan.
- 1874: Robert McDonnell
- 1875: John McDonnell
- 1876: Thomas Enright O'Brien.
- 1877: Charles Dawson
- 1878: William L. Hunt
- 1879: Charles McDonnell.
- 1880: Maurice Lenihan.
- 1881: Octavius Wallace
- 1882: William Boyd.
- 1883: William Boyd.
- 1884: Stephen Dowling.
- 1885: Stephen Dowling.
- 1886: Lawrence O'Keeffe
- 1887: James O'Mara
- 1888: Stephen O'Mara
- 1889: William J. O'Donnell.
- 1890: William M. Nolan.
- 1891: Patrick E. Bourke
- 1892: Thomas McMahon Cregan.
- 1893: Michael Spain.
- 1894: Patrick Kenna.
- 1895: Patrick Kenna
- 1896: Joseph P. Gaffney.
- 1897: Stephen Byrne Quin.
- 1898: Stephen Byrne Quin.
- 1899: Sir Thomas Henry Cleeve

=== 20th century ===
- 1900: Seamus F. de Barra.
- 1901: Patrick McDonnell.
- 1902: Patrick McDonnell.
- 1903: James Flynn.
- 1904: James Flynn.
- 1905: E. J. Long.
- 1906: E. J. Long.
- 1907: Sir Thomas Henry Cleeve.
- 1908: Sir Thomas Henry Cleeve.
- 1909: W.L. Stokes.
- 1910: William Holliday.
- 1911: Charles McDonnell.
- 1912: Charles McDonnell.
- 1913: Stephen O'Mara.
- 1914: Stephen O'Mara.
- 1915: Thomas S. Lawlor.
- 1916: Thomas S. Lawlor.
- 1917: James H. Roche.
- 1918: James H. Roche.
- 1918: Maurice P. Riordan.
- 1919: Maurice P. O'Riordan.
- 1920 – Office abolished.
