= Woodbrook College =

Coordinates: 53.2161°N 6.1206°W

Location
- Dublin Road; Bray, Dún Laoghaire–Rathdown; Ireland

Information
- School type: High school
- Motto: Learning Together for a Better Future
- Founded: 1956
- Principal: Henry Hurley
- Years: First through sixth
- Gender: Mixed
- Age range: 12-19
- Enrollment: 436

Woodbrook College is an Edmund Rice, co-educational secondary school located in Woodbrook, Bray, Dún Laoghaire–Rathdown, Ireland. Part of the Edmund Rice Schools Trust (ERST). Previously called St Brendan's College, the school was rebranded as part of a rebuild and expansion from 2016.

The grounds are located on the Dublin Road, just north of Bray. Although, officially, it is over the County Dublin border, it is usually referred to as being in County Wicklow and part of Bray. The former building was opened on 5 September 1956, and accommodated approximately 400 students.

The school celebrated its fiftieth year in 2006, thus marking its Golden Jubilee. This led to a visit by President of Ireland, Mary McAleese.

== Subjects ==
Woodbrook College offers a range of subjects, both optional and core. Out of the four optional subjects offered for the Junior Cycle, a maximum of two can be taken. Out of the twelve optional subjects for the Senior Cycle, a maximum of four can be taken.

== Extracurricular activities ==
Woodbrook College offers students many extracurricular activities. Among them are basketball, supervised study, rugby, Gaelic games, association football (soccer), athletics and debating.

== Notable alumni ==
- Sandy Smith (b. 1945) - cricketer
- Fergal Devitt (b. 1981) - professional wrestler
