= Shankill, Dublin =

Outlying suburb of Dublin, Ireland

Shankill Seanchill (Irish)
- Suburb
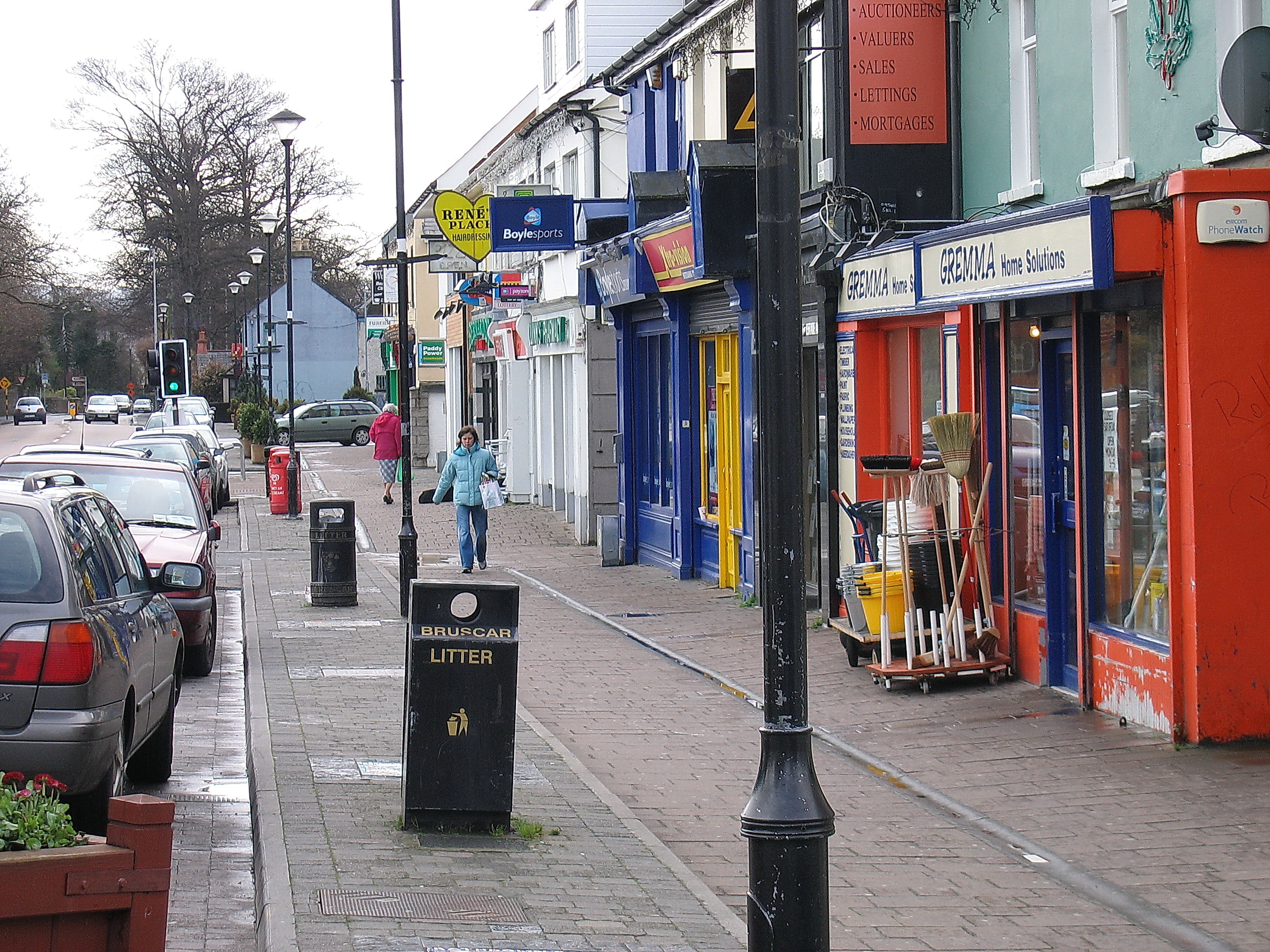
- Shankill

- Location in Ireland
- Coordinates: 53.226°N 6.124°W
- Country: Ireland
- Province: Leinster
- County: County Dublin
- Local government area: Dún Laoghaire–Rathdown

Government
  - Local authority: Dún Laoghaire–Rathdown County Council
  - Dáil constituency: Dún Laoghaire

Area
  - Suburb: 6.4 km^{2} (2.5 sq mi)
- Elevation: 29 m (95 ft)

Population (2016)
  - Urban: 14,257
- Time zone: UTC+0 (WET)
  - Summer (DST): UTC+1 (IST (WEST))
- Eircode routing key: D18
- Telephone area code: +353(0)1
- Irish Grid Reference: O249220

Shankill (Irish: Seanchill, meaning 'Old Church') is a suburb of Dublin, Ireland, on the southeast of County Dublin, close to the border with County Wicklow. It is in the local government area of Dún Laoghaire–Rathdown and had a population of 14,257 as of the 2016 census. It runs from the coast, between Loughlinstown and Bray, inland towards the foothills of the Dublin Mountains. Shankill borders Rathmichael, as well as Loughlinstown, Killiney, Ballybrack and Bray in County Wicklow. It is part of the civil parish of Rathmichael and contains the formerly separate district of Shanganagh, and in its southern parts, the locality of Crinken.

== Etymology ==
The name Shankill derives from the Irish term "Seanchill," which translates to "old church" or "ancient church." The word "sean" means "old," and "cill" means "church." This name is believed to reference an early Christian monastic settlement or an ancient church that once stood in the area, reflecting Shankill's historical significance as a site of religious and communal activity.

The nearby area of Shanganagh, which means "full of ants" in Irish, includes a major cemetery.

== Geography ==
The townland of Shankill was originally located on lands further northwest at Puck's Castle but today the area of Shankill is usually understood to lie towards the coast, while the inland reaches form Rathmichael (historically Shankill was absorbed into Rathmichael civil parish), with an area of around 6.5 square kilometres (1,600 acres). Carrickgollogan Hill (278m) lies to the west, with the Ballycorus Leadmines to the northwest, and Loughlinstown and Killiney to the north. The town of Bray, County Wicklow lies to the south.

== History ==
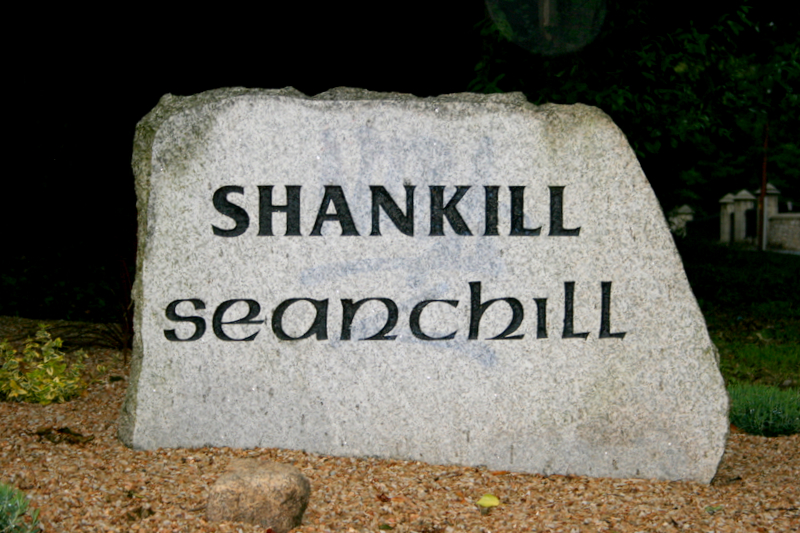
Bilingual welcome stone in English and Irish

=== Early history ===
Shankill features a number of antiquities, including ráths and cromlechs.

Around 1230, there were forests that were cleared under the orders of the then-owner of Shankill, Archbishop Luke. Courts for serious crimes in the style of assizes were conducted at Shankill during this period. To keep the native Gaelic Irish out, barriers and fortified gates protected parts of the townland. The manor of Shankill was overrun by the native Irish and completely destroyed a century later. In response to these incursions, a large garrison was re-instated. The Irish were restrained from entering and the land was eventually re-let as grazing land.

=== Middle Ages ===
The Lawless family features prominently in the history of Shankill. In 1408, family members took control of the seigniory of Shanganagh and, by 1480, several branches of the family were residents of Shankill.

Between 1400 and 1600, a number of fortified structures - whose remains can still be seen to this day in Shankill and Rathmichael - were built: Shankill Castle, Shanganagh Castle and a strong house known locally as Puck's Castle. The Walsh family, which came to prominence in the 16th century, built several further defensive structures in Shankill.

From 1640 onwards, the native Irish were subdued in a series of confrontations, leading to greater agricultural use of the lands. Around this time, Shankill was absorbed into the parish of Rathmichael.

The Walshes quit the lands of Shankill primarily due to the Act of Commonwealth which redistributed landowners and tenancies. After this, the Lawless families regained possession for the third time of lands around Shankill. The last Lawless died in 1795, whereupon the lands became the possession of the third Sir William Domvile, resident of nearby Loughlinstown House. The Domvile family had been granted the lands surrounding Loughlinstown under the Restoration.

=== 19th century ===
==== The Domviles ====
Shankill and Rathmichael were the property of Sir Charles Compton William Domvile (1822–1884). Domvile was known as an uncompromising and ruthless landlord and sought to change the usage of land from the smallholdings that existed at the time of his inheritance of the estate. At this time Shankill was a rural village, but Domvile intended to build grand Georgian-style housing developments, squares and streets to gentrify the area, thereby making it attractive for wealthy Dublin city-based professionals to live in. During Domvile's time, new roads and streets were laid out, as well as water mains which feed a relief tank from Vartry Reservoir, continuing on to Stillorgan reservoir. However, Domvile was an impetuous man and acted unreasonably with his tenants and prospective buyers of estates on his holdings. His personal debts mounted as a result of his financing two large estates at Shankill and Santry, ultimately resulting in his bankruptcy.

The net outcome of Domvile's actions was to halve the population of Shankill and Rathmichael during the 1860s. He evicted over 100 tenants, during a period of grinding poverty, and many were forced to re-negotiate their tenancies at usurious rates. Many of the evicted ended up in the local workhouse, the Rathdown Work Union, which is now the site of Loughlinstown Hospital.

==== The new Shankill ====
A landowner with holdings adjacent to the Shankill townland, Benjamin Tilly, granted quarter-acre holdings to some of the evicted tenants. Tilly's land straddled the townland border into Shanganagh, and thus the new holdings along the Shanganagh Road became known as 'Tillystown'. In 1871, there were over 60 houses, and around the start of the 20th century, this village became known as Shankill proper.

In 1911, a tract of land to the west of Shankill, known as 'New Vale', was developed as labourers' cottages.

=== 20th and 21st centuries ===
Shankill initially comprised large agricultural tracts broken into smallholdings for tenant farmers, and larger, grander estates with fine country houses, many of which still exist today. Large housing estates have been built on many of these estates. Additional tracts of land were also sold to developers who have built higher-density housing than the larger-plot housing estates constructed in the 1970s.

== Local antiquities and features ==
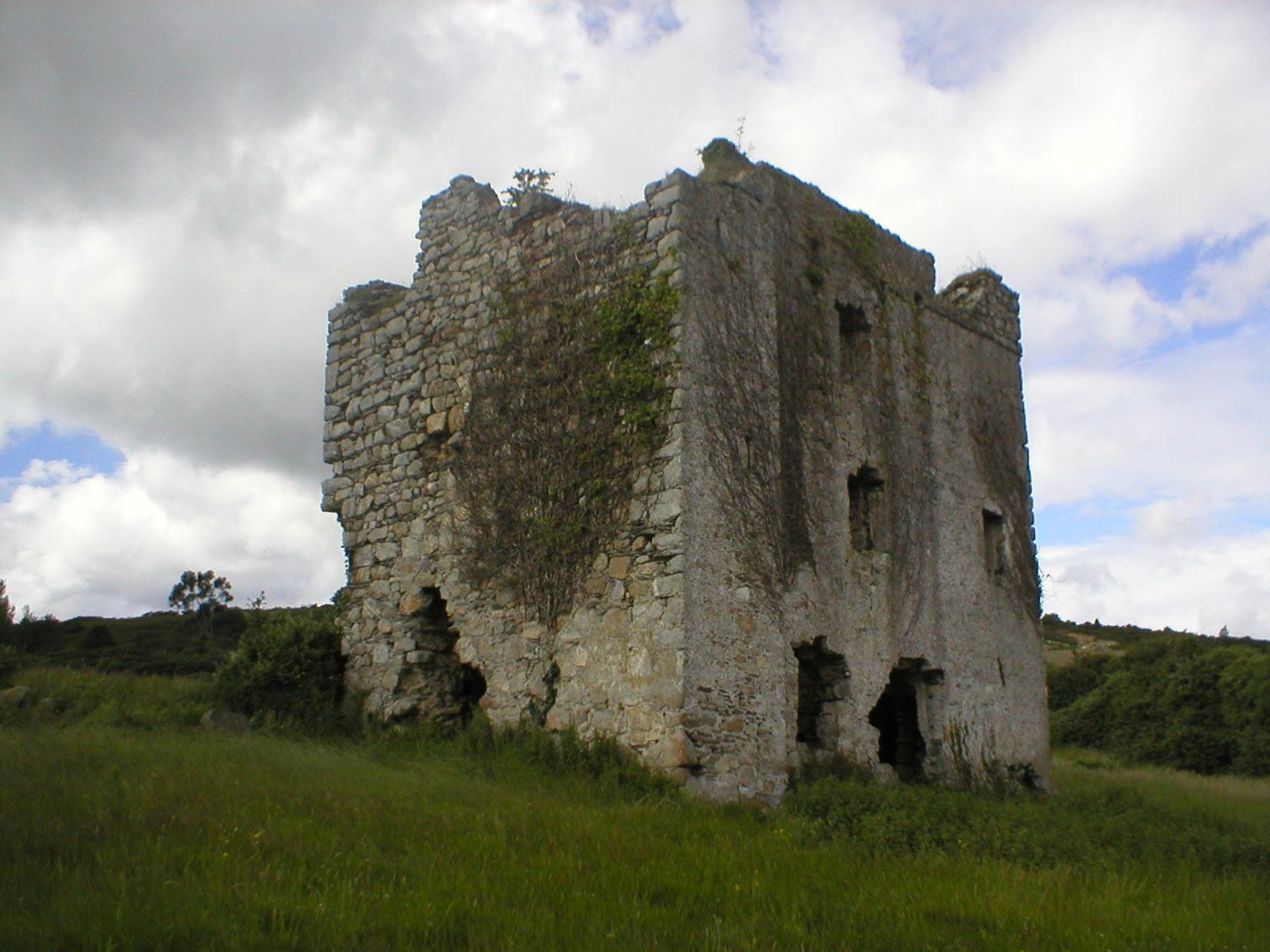
Puck's Castle

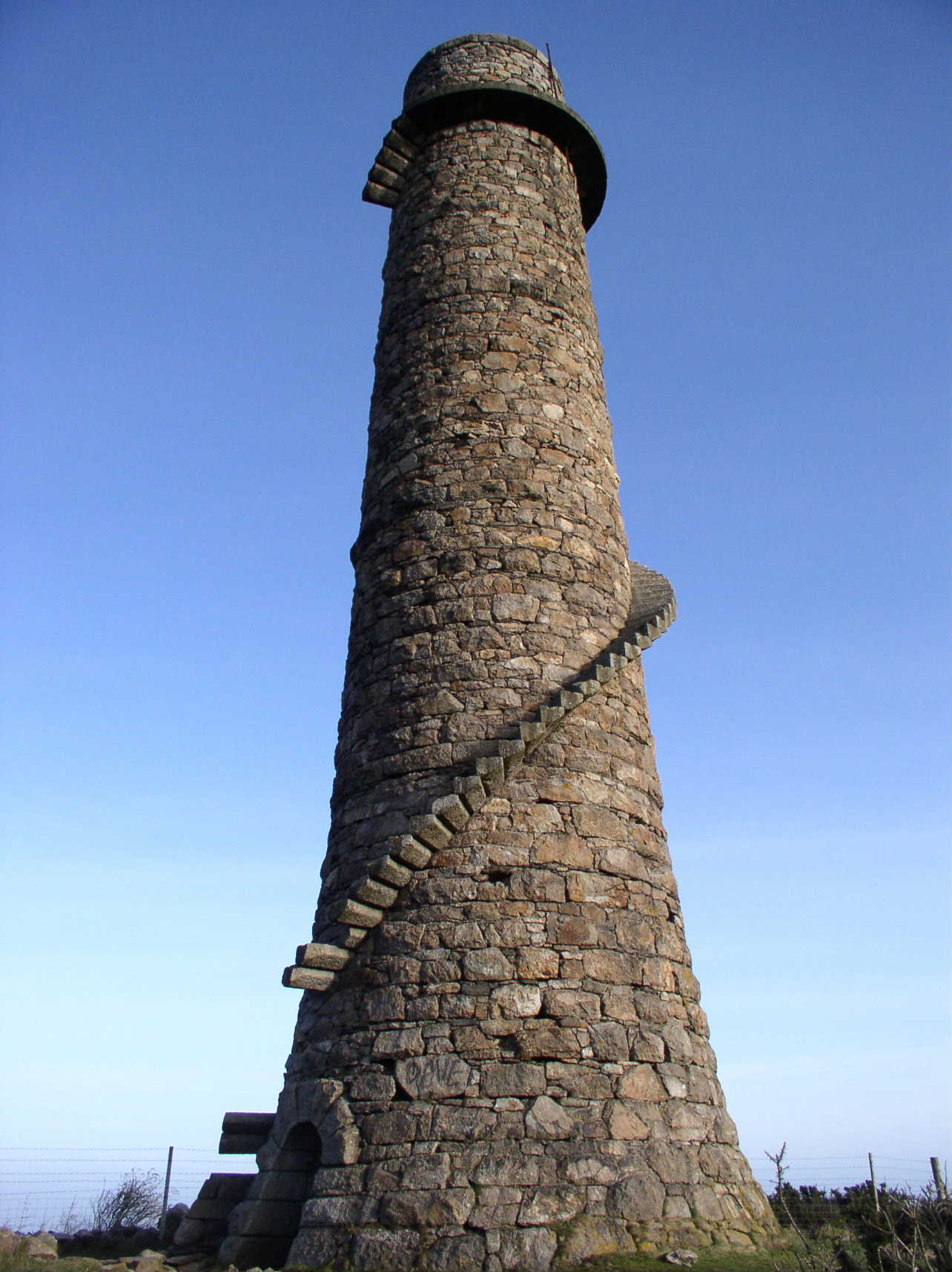
Ballycorus Chimney

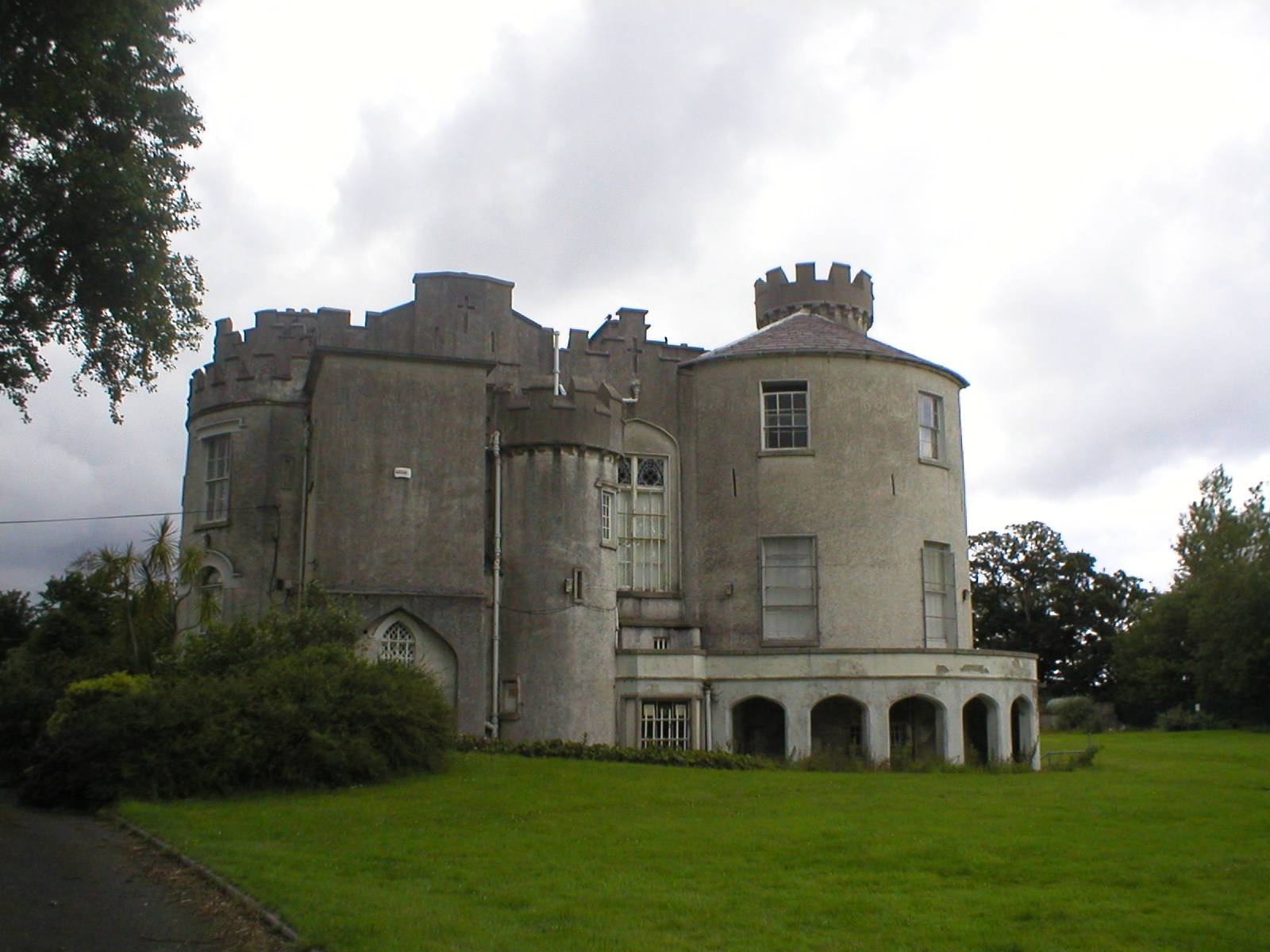
Shanganagh Castle (18th century)

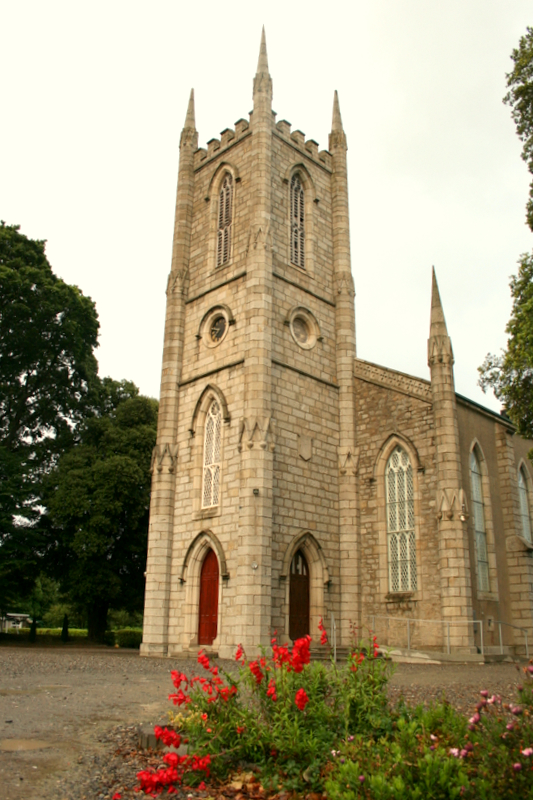
St. James's Church, Crinken (1840)

There are several antiquities in the area, including ruined churches and standing stones. The ruins of several castles and defensive-type structures remain, including Puck's Castle, Shankill Castle, Shanganagh Castle and a Martello Tower.

Some houses of architectural note include: Clontra, a coastal Gothic Revival mansion near Corbawn Wood and Quinn's Road; Crinken Castle House, Crinken, and Shanganagh House, a large mansion now surrounded by local authority housing estates. Clontra was built for Dublin barrister James Anthony Lawson QC (later Attorney General of Ireland, Judge of the High Court and Privy Councillor) and designed by the 19th-century architects Sir Thomas Newenham Deane and Benjamin Woodward in their trademark Italian medieval style.

The local library was formerly a courthouse built in the Victorian style of granite and mock Tudor features. There are also some follies such as a mock round tower built of red brick in the Castle Farm Farmyard.

Evidence of local industrial activity include the lead-mine chimney at Ballycorus. Other features include the 'upside down' houses by the Harcourt Street railway line bridge, which was the site of the original post office, and has its guest rooms downstairs, and its kitchen and living room upstairs. Shankill was accessible via the original Kingstown-Bray train line, which is now five metres from the sea in some places. A coastal wall was built from Killiney to Bray to try to stop the erosion, traces of which can still be seen along the beach. The medieval village of Longnon was sited some 200 yards (180 m) east of Quinn's Road beach but was obliterated by coastal erosion.

=== Buildings ===
==== Ballycorus Leadmines ====
Site of a lead ore smelter, a mile-long stone flue and a granite chimney on Carrickgollogan hill, which is visible from much of southeast Dublin.

==== Carnegie Library ====
Tudor-style library, architect R. M. Butler, 1912.

==== Clonasleigh ====
Clonasleigh, a house replaced by Shankill Shopping Centre (since upgraded and re-opened) was lived in by Frederick W. Meredith, once President of the Law Society, in the early 1900s. The name has been retained locally in Clonasleigh, a road with 16 houses, off Corbawn Lane, located close to the original house.

==== Clontra ====
Gothic mansion designed by Deane and Woodward, 1860, interior murals by John Hungerford Pollen. On 15 acres (61,000 m^{2}) of parkland by the coast, adjacent to Corbawn Wood estate.

==== Dorney Court ====
Originally called Clare Mount, built c. 1832, this fine Victorian house was demolished in 1984. Its site is now that of Shankill Garda Station. The grounds still contain a few Sequoia and Scots Pine trees following the felling of many of them in 1984.

==== Ferndale House ====
Large estate on several acres, the seat of David Plunket, 1st Baron Rathmore.

==== Mullinastill House ====
The former mill house is a listed structure and the set for several film scenes.

==== Puck's Castle ====
The 'castle', actually a fortified house, was built in the late 16th century. It provided a refuge in 1690 for James II and his army fleeing the Battle of the Boyne. One explanation for its name is that a ghost or puca inhabited the castle. In June 1867 the daughter of a local Englishman disappeared near the castle. Jane Eleanor Sherrard, daughter of Henry and Margaret Sherrard left her nearby home to pick flowers for the dinner table. When she failed to return home that evening the police were notified and a widespread search was conducted. The last confirmed sighting of Jane was by the local postman, who reported to have seen her picking flowers at the foot of the castle's northern wall. To this day the circumstances surrounding her disappearance remain unknown.

==== Rathmichael Church ====
Commissioned by Charles Domvile in 1860, and designed by Benjamin Woodward, in the Hiberno-Romanesque style. The Domviles had their own high-backed chairs, behind red velvet curtains.

==== Shanganagh Bridge (1829) ====
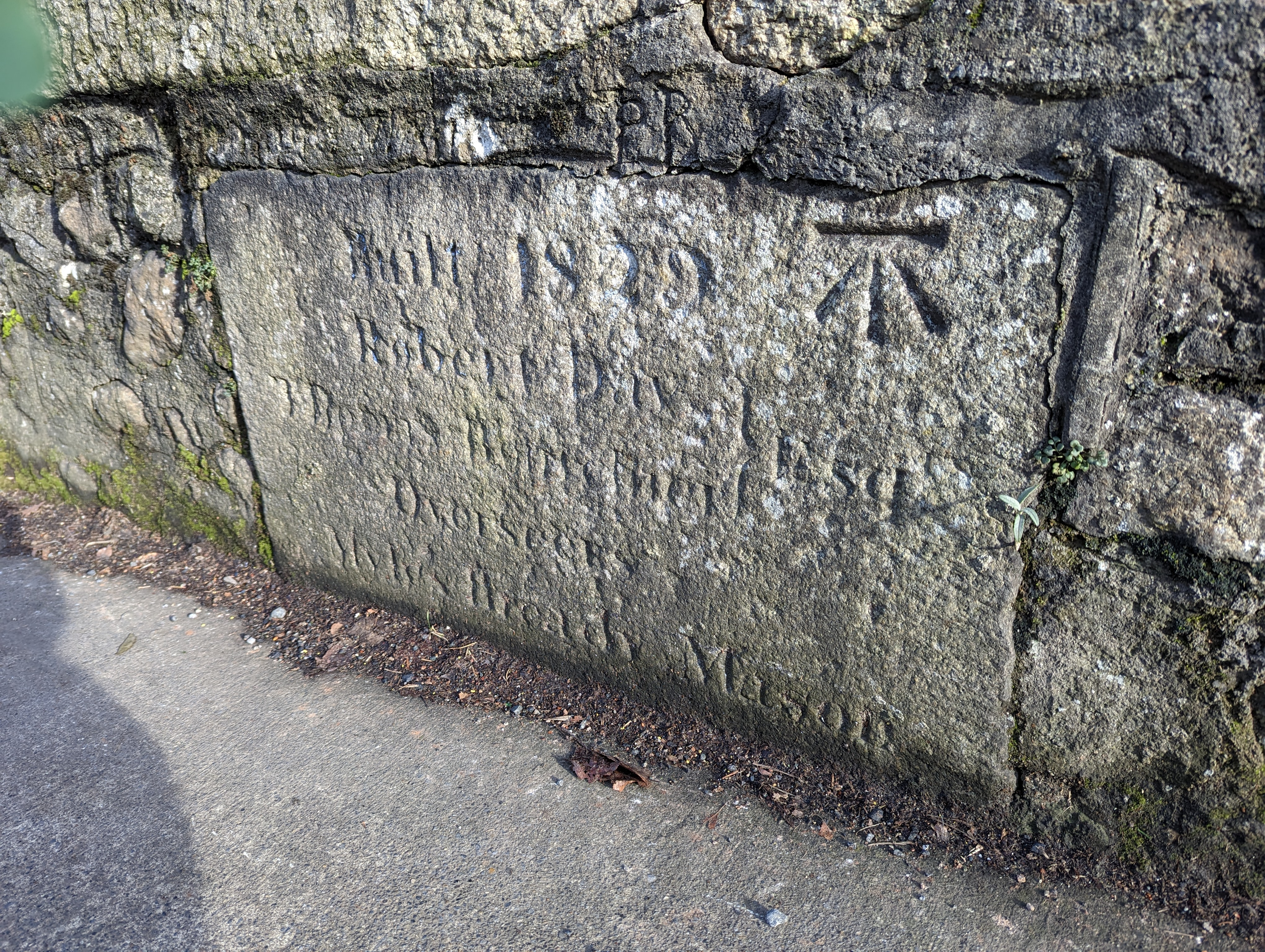
Inscription on Shanganagh Bridge, Shankill

Located at the junction of Commons Road and Shanganagh Road this bridge bears the worn inscription: "Built 1829 - Robert Day Thomas Bourchier Esq's - Overseers Myles Bready - Mason".

Robert Day, judge and MP, lived in Loughlinstown House. Day had a long career from the 1780s through to the 1830s. He was a member of King's Inns, and also of the Royal Dublin Society. Thomas Bourchier, Deputy Clerk of the Crown in the Irish House of Commons, lived in Killiney Castle, now the Fitzpatrick Castle Hotel, which is on the same road as Shanganagh Bridge. Bourchier died in 1832.

==== Shanganagh Castle (1408) ====
Located near Mill Lane, at the northern margins of the area, built in 1408 by the Lawless family and inhabited by their descendants until 1763, the castle was left in ruins by a fire in 1783. Only limited elements remain within the grounds of a later house.

==== Shanganagh Castle (18th century) ====
Several kilometres from the first Shanganagh Castle, during the late 18th century, a mansion was built on extensive lands running to the border of Shankill with County Wicklow. It was later used as an open prison for juveniles between 1969 and 2002. The site is now being developed by the local authority and Land Development Agency, with over 500 housing units planned, and the castle will be restored and reopened.

==== Shanganagh House ====
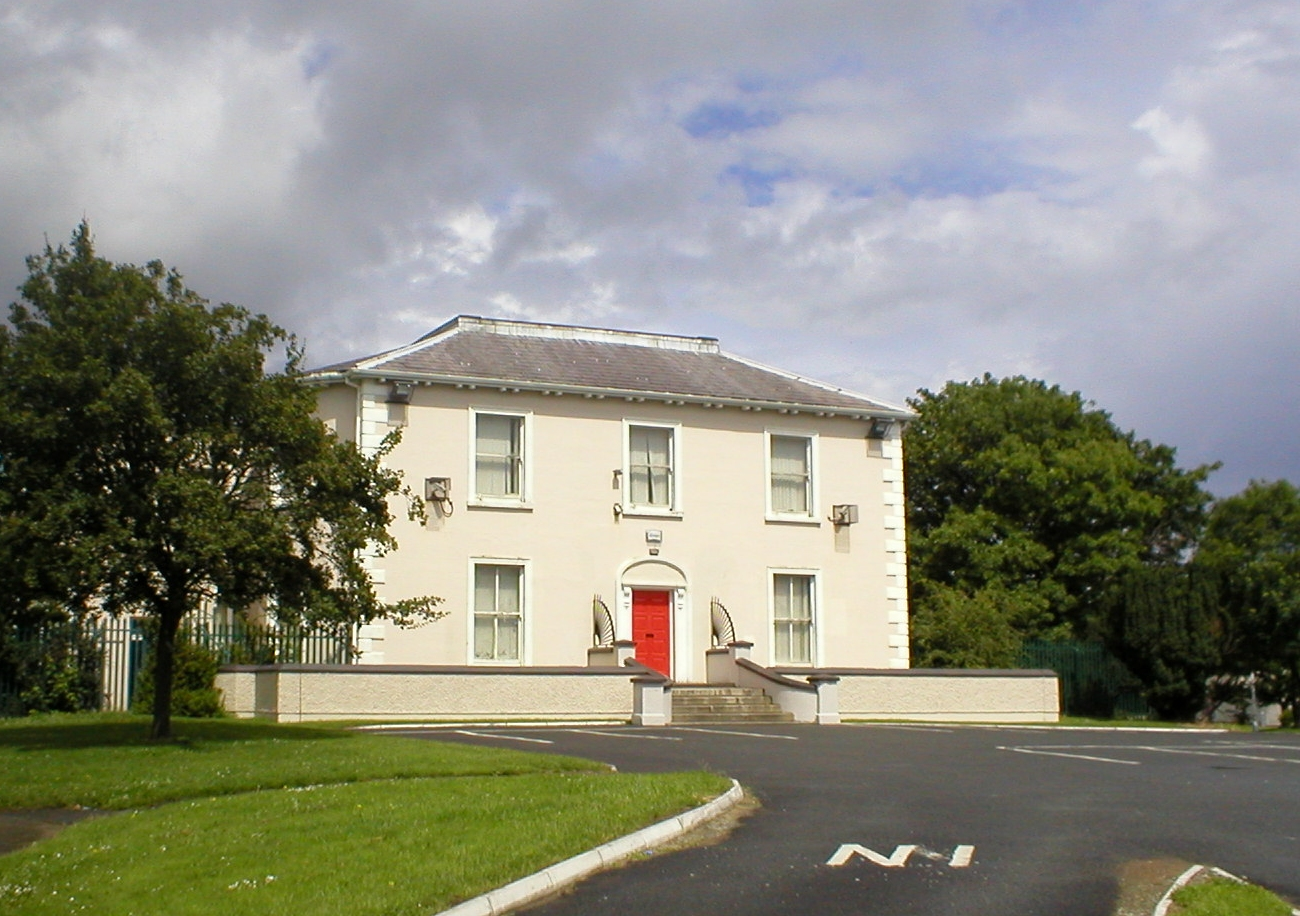
Shanganagh House

Later called Shanganagh Park, this Georgian-era mansion was built c. 1823 for William Hopper. Later residents included the Darcy brewing family and racehorse breeder Frank Field. It was compulsorily purchased by Dublin County Council in 1970; it now serves as a pre-school and is surrounded by late 1970s council houses.

==== Shankill Castle ====
Built by Archbishop Henry de Loundres in 1229; site of the ancient Shankill church. It is one of the oldest surviving structures in the area.

=== Infrastructure ===
==== Old Dublin & South East railway line ====
The Dublin and South Eastern Railway ran along the coast, seaward from the modern DART and railway line, connecting Killiney and Bray.

==== Old Harcourt Street line ====
The former railroad running from Dublin to Bray on an inland route; closed in 1958. The D&SER and Harcourt Street railway line met at Shanganagh Junction.

==== Defunct link line ====
The Harcourt Street line continued seawards to meet the original D&SER line at Tyrell's land; this link closed in 1915 when the Shanganagh Diversion came into service.

==== The new D&SER line (modern line) ====
The coastal line was moved inland, from Ballybrack to Wood Glen, due to coastal erosion, the new line, the "Shanganagh Diversion", opened on 1 October 1915. A new connection to the Harcourt Street line was made at a new Shanganagh Junction, and stations were reworked.

==== Sanitation ====
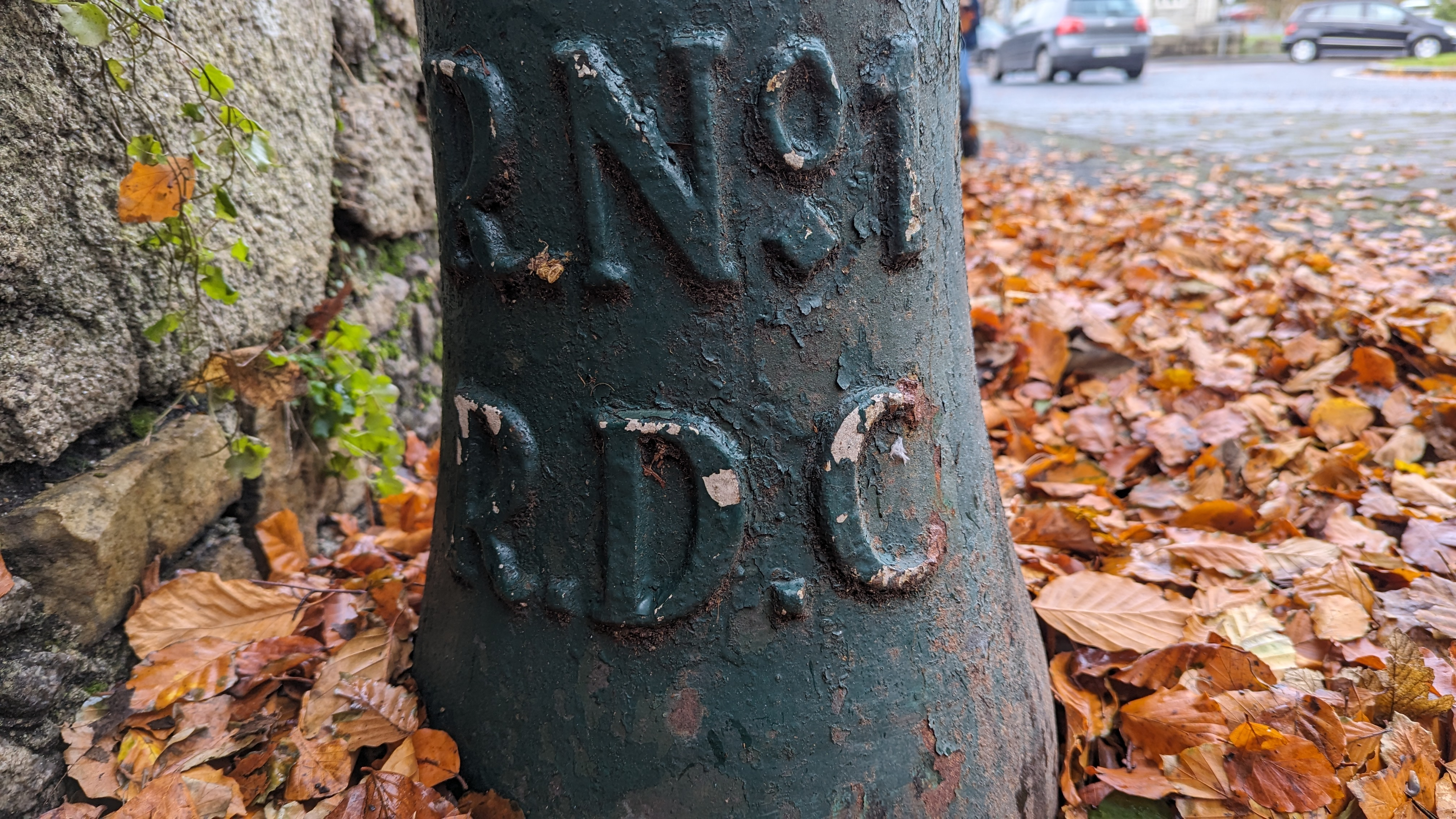
Inscription on sanitation pole in Shankill Village 'R.No.1 R.D.C. 1911'

A sanitation pole in Shankill Village bears the cast lettering 'R.No.1 R.D.C. 1911'. Rural Districts were administrative divisions created in 1899. This inscription refers to the then Rathdown No.1 administrative district (as distinct from Rathdown No.2 district south of Bray). The two Rathdown districts were abolished in 1930 and 1925 respectively.

== Amenities ==
=== Education ===
Shankill has 3 primary schools; Scoil Mhuire (Roman Catholic), Rathmichael Parish National School (Church of Ireland) and Saint Anne's National School (Roman Catholic).

=== Religion ===
Shankill has one Roman Catholic church, St Anne's, and a Church of Ireland (Anglican) church, St James', at Crinken (to the south), and Rathmichael, which has had a church for more than 800 years, also has a Church of Ireland church, simply named for the area, as well as a non-denominational independent local church called Shankill Bible Church.

=== Retail ===
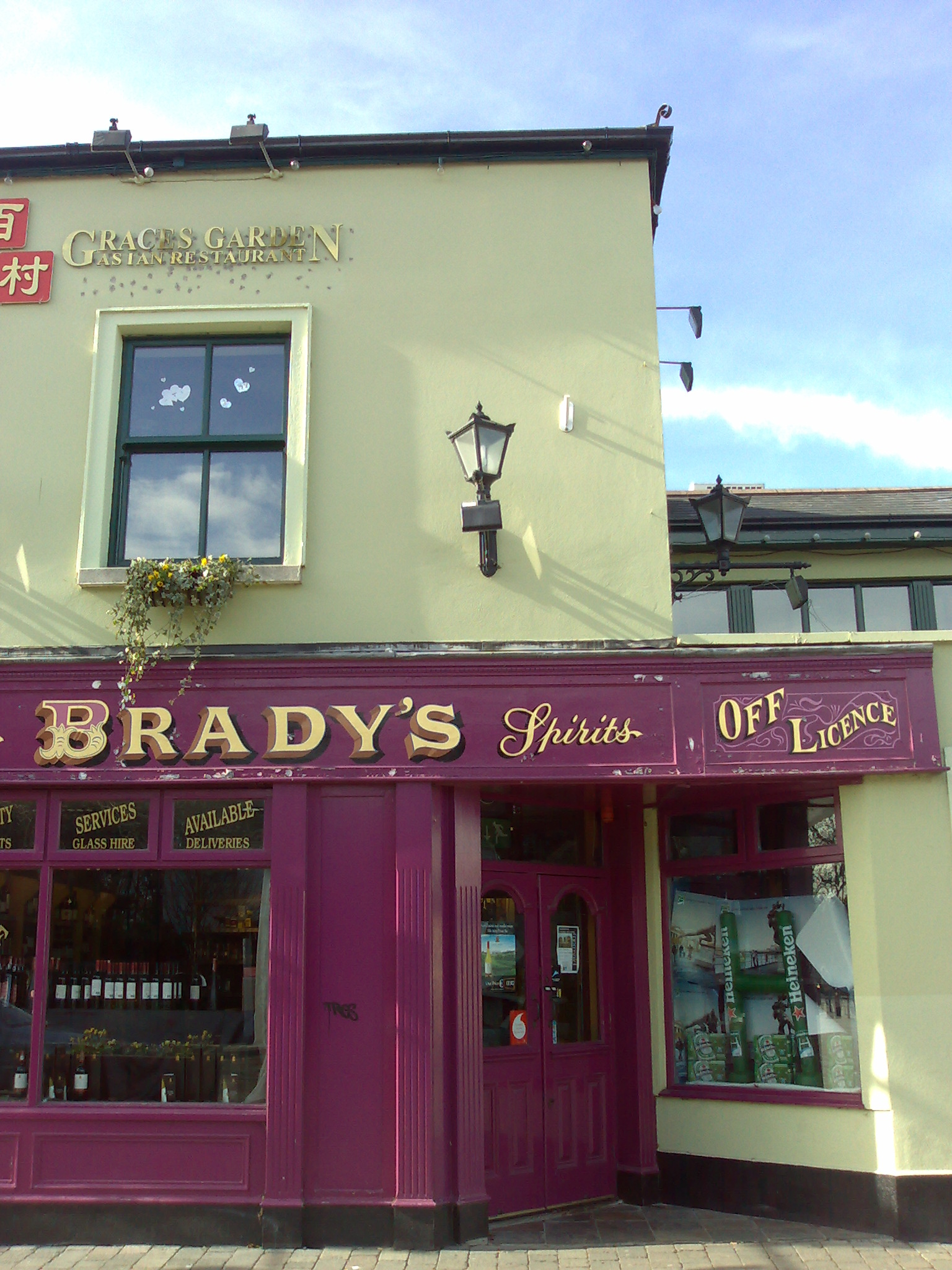
Brady's pub

Shankill is served by a convenience store, takeaway restaurants, bookmakers, barbers, pharmacies, hairdressers and beauty salon and a Lidl shopping centre. The local credit union has an office on the main street. There is also a public library.

== Sport and leisure ==
=== Walking ===
The trailhead of the Dublin Mountains Way, a long-distance walking route (43 km trail) across the Dublin Mountains between Shankill and Tallaght begins on the main street.

=== Football ===
Local soccer teams include Shankill FC, which has schoolboy and schoolgirl sides.

=== Tennis ===
Shankill Tennis Club, which opened a new clubhouse in 2007 and indoor courts in 2016, is located at the junction of Quinn's Road and Corbawn Drive.

=== GAA ===
Shankill GAA Club re-formed in 2013 after a 20-year absence. As of 2021 the club fielded approximately 30 teams across Gaelic football, hurling and camogie in both underage and adult teams.

=== Sailing ===
In about 1877, a sailing club was formed at the end of Corbawn Lane called the Shankill Corinthian Sailing Club for the promotion and encouragement of amateur seamanship. The membership came from the residents of the houses in the immediate vicinity. They sailed in small open boats without centre-boards or keels which were light enough to be pulled up on the beach by two men. The club survived for more than 10 years before many of the members relocated their sailing activities to Kingstown.

== Awards and recognition ==
In 2007, Shankill won the prestigious "National Best Urban Village" award, alongside two additional honors in the Tidy Towns Competition.

In 2019, Shankill Tidy Towns received the Climate Change Award in the Dún Laoghaire-Rathdown County Council Tidy Districts competition for their "Trees for All" project , aiming to plant one tree for every resident of the village.

In 2024, Shankill achieved a Gold Award at the Midlands & East Regional Awards Ceremony for their continued efforts in enhancing the local environment.

== Shankill, Belfast ==
Like its namesake the Shankill district of Belfast, Dublin's Shankill also has its own Falls Road. Occasionally, the primary schools and community groups in both Shankills hold football or other sporting events to promote closer north–south ties.

== Transport ==
=== Bus ===
Dublin Bus routes 7b and E1 connect Shankill with the city centre. The Go-Ahead Ireland routes 45a and 45b connect the area to Kilmacanogue and Dún Laoghaire.

The Aircoach service from Greystones to Dublin airport also stops at the main street Dublin Bus stop, although originally it was planned to stop outside Brady's of Shankill (aka Mickey Byrne's Bar; the stop still has this name despite being approximately 50 metres from the pub itself), en route to the airport.

=== Rail ===
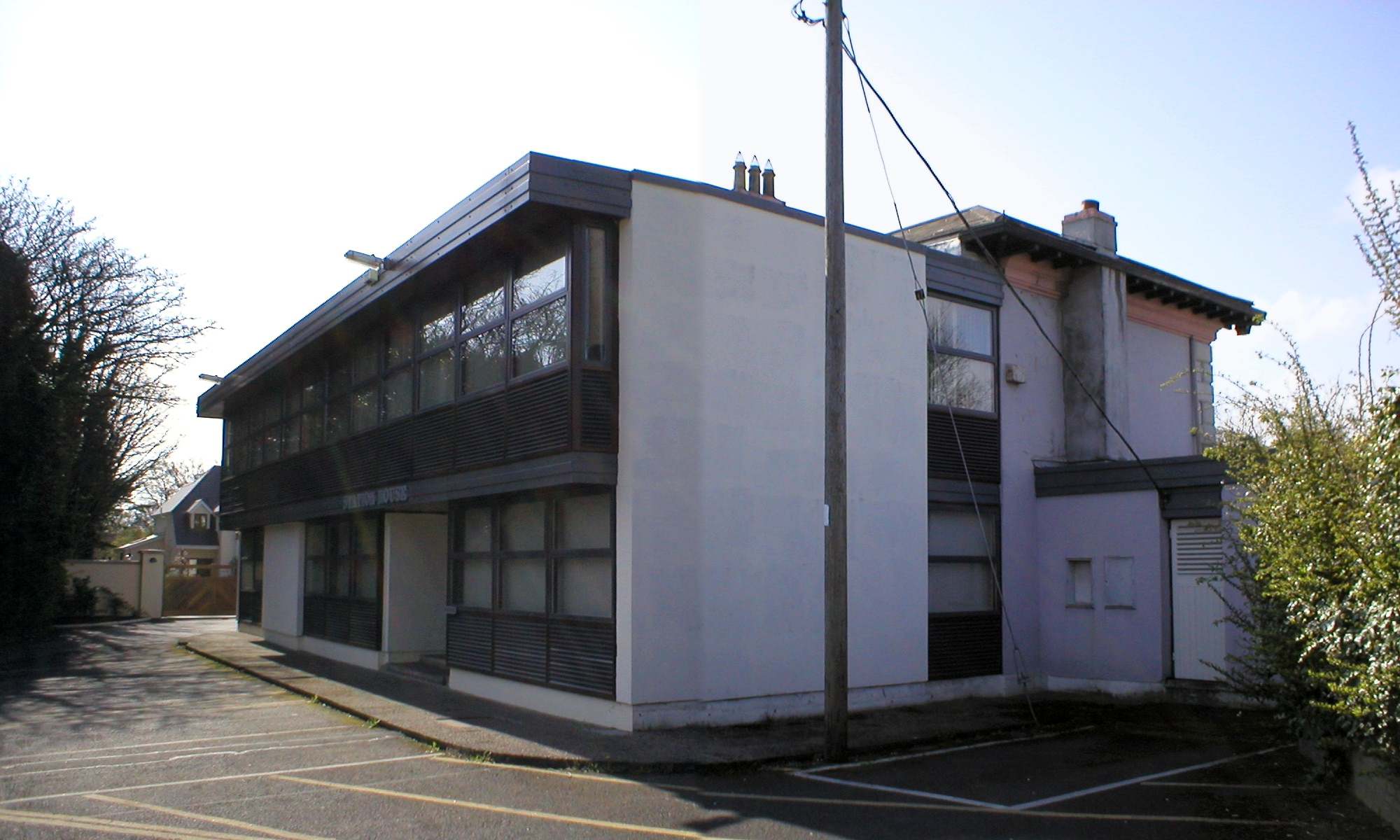
The former DW&WR Shankill station house

Shankill station - located between Rathsallagh Park and Corbawn Lane - is the third-last stop on the southbound leg of Dublin's DART line.

The original Shankill station was on the Harcourt Street line, which opened following the opening of the Dublin and Wicklow Railway in 1854. The line closed in 1958, and the current station in Shankill opened in 1977.

=== Luas ===
The closest Luas stops (Green Line) are at Cherrywood and Brides Glen, with connections to Dublin city centre (Parnell) and Broombridge. There have been plans to extend the Green Line to the station in Bray, which if they went ahead as planned, would mean the line would pass through Shankill. However these plans are dormant for now.

=== Road ===
The N11 national route used to run through Shankill, until the M11 bypass was built nearby. The area can now be accessed via coastal roads, from the M11, or by a road at Crinken which overflies the M11.

== People ==
- Bertie Messitt, multiple Irish record holder and Olympian who competed in the 1960 Rome Olympics
- Chris Horn, long-time resident, academic entrepreneur, co-founder of NASDAQ-listed IONA Technologies, owner of Askefield
- Des Cahill, RTÉ sports journalist
- Eamon Gilmore, former Tánaiste and former leader of the Labour Party
- Gemma O'Doherty, a far-right activist and conspiracy theorist, born in Ranelagh.
- George Morrison, director of Mise Éire and other documentaries
- Mary Bergin, folk musician and a well recognized master of the tin whistle
- Michael Patrick Kelly (Paddy Kelly), from The Kelly Family
- Pádraig Harrington, professional golfer and three-time Major winner
- Sandy Smith (born 1945), former first-class cricketer, born in Shanganagh
- Shane Ross, business journalist and academic, a former resident of Askefield, the old St James' parsonage at Crinken
- Stephanie Roche, footballer. Second to James Rodríguez in the 2014 FIFA Puskas Award with 33% of the vote.

== See also ==
- List of towns and villages in Ireland
