= Cry of Morning =

1971 novel by Brian Cleeve

- First edition
- Author: Brian Cleeve
- Language: English
- Genre: Novel
- Publisher: Michael Joseph
- Publication date: 15 November 1971
- Publication place: United Kingdom/Ireland
- Media type: Print (hardback and paperback)
- Pages: 363 pp (hardback edition)
- ISBN: 0-7181-0762-4 (hardback edition)

Cry of Morning is a novel by the English-born author, Brian Cleeve. It deals with the economic and cultural transformation that overtook Ireland during the 1960s. It marked a significant shift away from the murder mysteries and spy thrillers for which Cleeve had previously been noted.

== Plot summary ==
The novel is set in the Republic of Ireland during the period of economic expansion that took place in the 1960s when Seán Lemass was Taoiseach. The narrative is concerned with an attempt by property developer, Francis O'Rourke, to erect a new office block in the centre of Dublin. The site is occupied by a slum dwelling whose occupants are about to be evicted in order to make way for the new development. Pitted against O'Rourke is a determined coalition of interests opposed to his plans. As the story unfolds, Cleeve highlights examples of corruption in Irish political and business life at that time.

== Characters in "Cry of Morning" ==
Francis O'Rourke: an Irish-born property developer who has made his fortune working in England.

John Lennox: a high-profile TV presenter.

Lady Honoria Gandon: a member of the Anglo-Irish aristocracy who leads the campaign against the destruction of historic Dublin buildings.

Felicity O'Connor: a playwright from the west of Ireland whose semi-autobiographical plays make her famous in England.

Father Herbert Tracey: a Catholic priest who works with the poor and who is concerned with social justice.

== Literary significance & criticism ==
The Irish Times (20 November 1971): "The book is a consummately professional piece of work, continuously interesting and amusing, its extensive cast so intricately marshalled that each takes his precise share of the limelight."

Evening Standard (January 11, 1972): "This is an honest book, and an entertaining one, with its face resolutely set against sentimentality. It must be as good a picture of Ireland today as we are likely to get."

== Film, TV or other adaptations ==
In conjunction with Peter Hoar, Brian Cleeve adapted Cry of Morning as a radio play and it was broadcast by the BBC in 1974.

== Trivia ==
- Because of libel fears, Cleeve's regular publisher, Cassell, delayed publication several times. His patience exhausted, Cleeve took back the manuscript and sold it to the eventual publisher, Michael Joseph Ltd.
- The novel was originally entitled The Green and the Gold, but Cleeve came up with the present title prior to publication.
- Doubleday published the novel in the USA as The Triumph of O'Rourke.
- Several of the characters are quickly recognisable as thinly disguised versions of real people in Irish society of the time; "John Lennox" is obviously Gay Byrne while "Felicity O'Connor" closely resembles Edna O'Brien.

== Release details ==
- 1971, United Kingdom, Michael Joseph Ltd. ISBN 0-7181-0762-4, Pub date 15 November 1971, Hardback
- 1972, United Kingdom, Corgi ISBN 0-552-09104-9, Pub date 15 December 1972, Paperback
