= Puck's Castle =

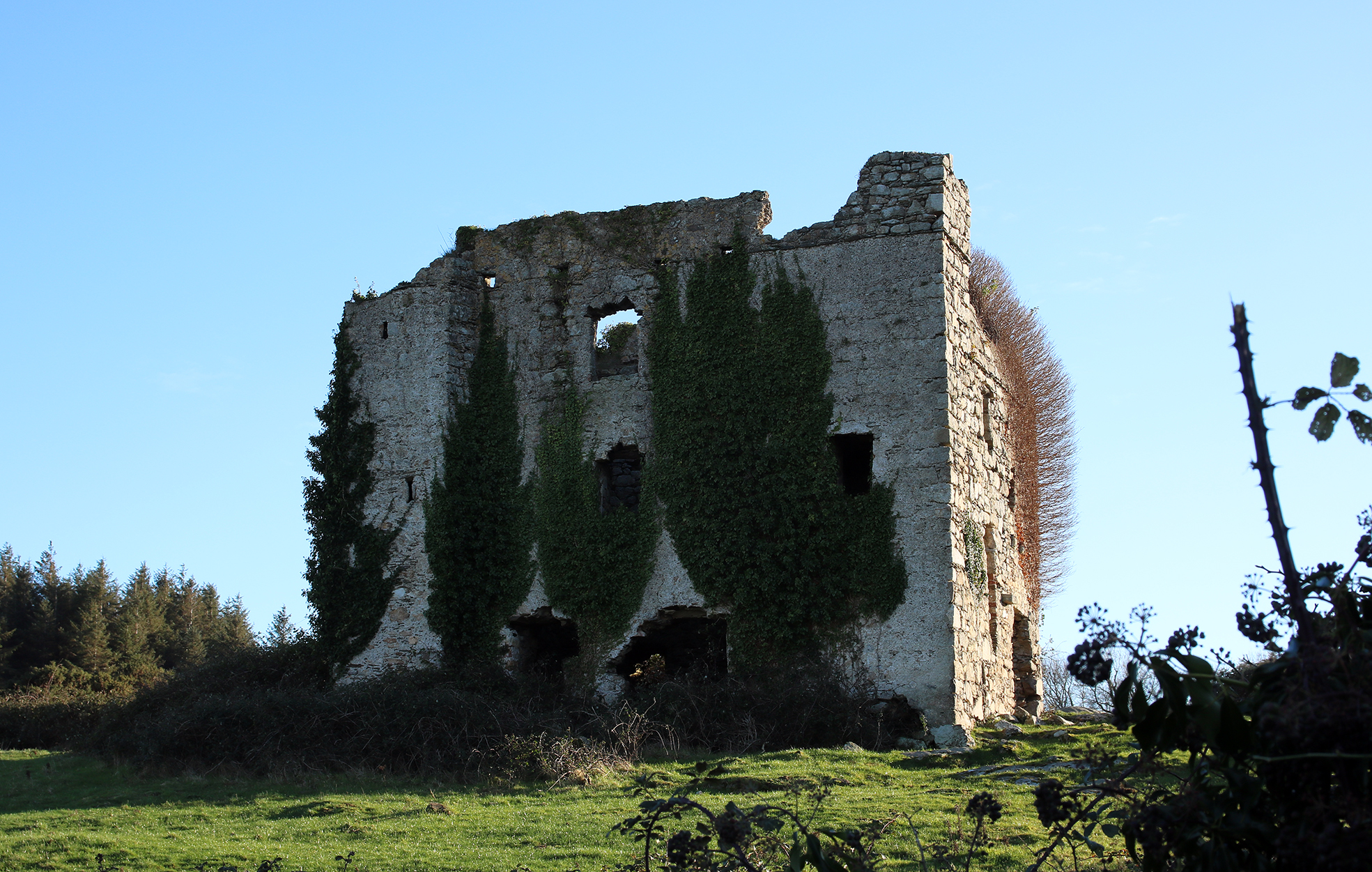
- Puck's Castle from the outside

- Location within Ireland
- 53°13′51″N 6°09′18″W
- Location: Puck's Castle Lane, Rathmichael, County Dublin, Ireland

History
- Built: c. 1537

Site notes
- Elevation: 134 m (440 ft)

Puck's Castle (Irish: Caisleán an Phúca) is a castle ruin in Rathmichael, County Dublin, Ireland. The castle is thought to have been erected by Peter Talbot in 1537, along with nearby castles on the Pale, to defend from the incursions of the O'Toole clan. The name 'Puck's Castle' is derived from the Celtic folklore spirit the 'Púca', which lends itself to local legend that the castle is haunted.

== History ==
In 1690, Puck's Castle allegedly provided refuge for King James II and members of his fleeing army after his defeat at the Battle of the Boyne.

In June 1867 the daughter of a local Englishman, Jane Eleanor Sherrard, disappeared near the castle after she went out to pick flowers for her dinner-table. Though the police began a widespread search for her, she was never found. The last known sighting of her was by a local postman, who claimed to have seen her picking flowers outside the castle.

== Building ==
Puck's Castle is a 3-storey fortified tower. It's roughly 10 metres in length, 7 metres in width, and has a height of 9 metres at the northwest corner. The entrance doorway is in the west wall. Inside the castle is a stone stairwell leading to the first floor and evidence of a fireplace, although much of how the castle may have looked before falling into disrepair is unknown.

== See also ==
- Castles in Great Britain and Ireland
- List of castles in Ireland

Media related to Puck's Castle, Dublin at Wikimedia Commons
