= R824 road (Ireland) =

Road in Ireland

R824 road
- Bóthar R824
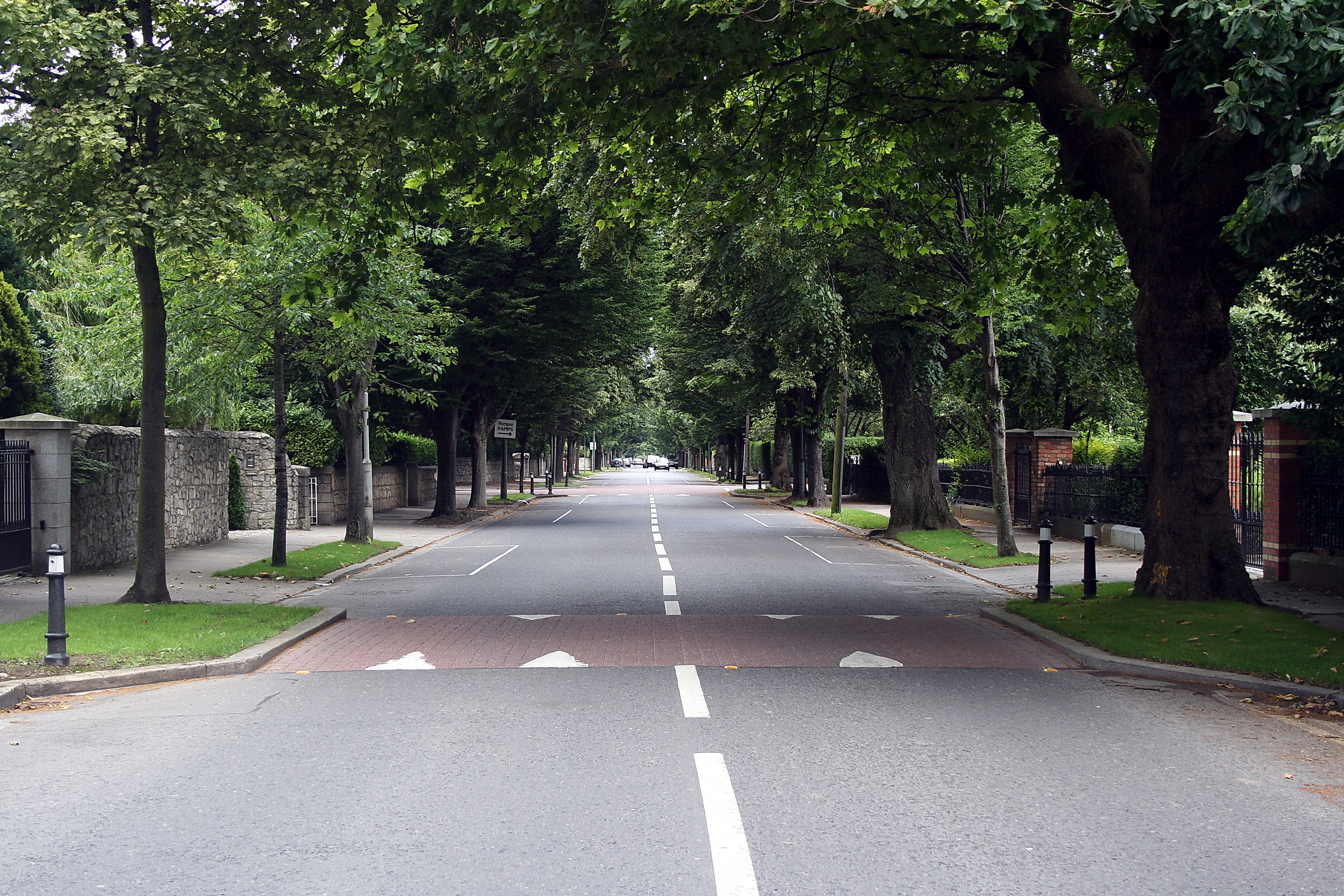
- Ailesbury Road, on the R824

Route information
- Length: 1.7 km (1.1 mi)

Location
- Country: Ireland
- Primary destinations: Dublin City; Start of route at Sandford/Clonskeagh (R117, R825); Donnybrook (R138, R815); Route terminates near Sydney Parade at junction with Merrion Road (R118)

Highway system
- Roads in Ireland; Motorways; Primary; Secondary; Regional

The R824 road is a regional road in south Dublin, Ireland. The road starts somewhere between Sandford and Clonskeagh, passes through Donnybrook and finishes at the junction with the Merrion Road and Ailesbury Road close by to Sydney Parade.

== Route ==
- The road starts at the junction of the R117 (Milltown Road from the west and Sandford Road from the north) and R825 (Clonskeagh Road) and heads in an easterly direction known as Eglinton Road.
- The first section of the route terminates at a junction with the R138 in Donnybrook close to the River Dodder.
- On the other side of the river and the R138, the route continues as the Anglesea Road for a short distance before it turns off into Ailesbury Road while Anglesea Road continues as the R815.
- The road terminates at the junction with the R118 (Merrion Road).

== Transport ==
- An on-street cycle track is present for the length of Eglinton Road. There are no bus routes present on the route.

== See also ==
- Roads in Ireland
