= Church of the Sacred Heart, Donnybrook =

Roman Catholic church in Dublin, Ireland

- Facade of the church in 2025
- Church of the Sacred Heart, Donnybrook
- 53.3192035°N 6.2311733°W
- Address: Stillorgan Road, Donnybrook, Dublin 4, D04 HW82
- Country: Ireland
- Denomination: Roman Catholic Church
- Website: donnybrookparish.ie

History
- Dedication: Sacred Heart

Architecture
- Heritage designation: Protected Structure (RPS 7845)
- Architect(s): Patrick Byrne prepared some plans George Ashlin and E. W. Pugin design and execution
- Groundbreaking: 12 June 1863 (Foundation stone laid)
- Completed: 26 August 1866 (Opened)
- Construction cost: £7,000

Specifications
- Materials: Granite with sandstone dressings

Administration
- Archdiocese: Archdiocese of Dublin
- Deanery: Donnybrook Deanery
- Parish: Donnybrook Partnership

Clergy
- Priest: Ciaran O'Carroll

The Church of the Sacred Heart, Donnybrook is a Catholic Church in the suburb and parish of Donnybrook, Dublin, Ireland which opened on 26 August 1866.

It faces on to the former Stillorgan Road and what is now the N11 with a rear entrance from Ailesbury Road near the junction with Anglesea Road.

== History ==
The area around Donnybrook Cemetery formed a medieval ecclesiastic enclosure founded by Saint Broc. The Irish name Domhnach Broc, gives its name to the phonetic English spelling of Donnybrook.

Later the church of St. Mary was dedicated by the Archbishop of Dublin, Archbishop John Comyn sometime between 1181 and 1212. Around the same time an act of parliament was passed by King John (Fairs Act 1204) providing for 'the erection of castle and fortifications at Dublin; establishment of fairs at Donnybrook, Waterford and Limerick' thus creating Donnybrook Fair.

An earlier catholic chapel had been constructed in 1787 next to the old protestant St. Mary's Church in Donnybrook village and next to the graveyard. Part of this chapel now acts as the boundary wall dividing the graveyard from the Garda Station.

=== Current church ===
Donnybrook Fair had taken place on Donnybrook Fair Green close to the present day Donnybrook Stadium on the far side of the River Dodder from the present church. In the 1840s and 1850s, a campaign was launched to suppress the fair and became more active over the years owing to the fair's drunkenness and debauchery. In 1853, an energetic young curate named Patrick J Nowlan joined the parish and spearheaded the campaign to buy out the Royal Patent to hold the fair from John and Peter Madden for £3,000. He also worked to make amends for all the past sins by raising money for the construction of a new church and was said to have even raised £1,000 from Princess Eugenie.

In the 1850s, the archbishop of Dublin assigned Monsignor Andrew O’Connell to choose a site for the new church with a site on the higher bank of the River Dodder being chosen facing the former Fair Green.

The church was constructed between 1863–1866 to the design of George Ashlin and E. W. Pugin in a Victorian gothic style. Patrick Byrne had earlier prepared proposals and was chosen as architect but resigned due to his advanced age and died in January 1864 soon after the construction of the church had commenced.

The foundation stone of the new church was laid on 12 June 1863 by Archbishop Paul Cullen.

The building was constructed mainly in granite with Bath stone and Whitehouse sandstone dressings. It was built by Michael Meade of Great Brunswick Street and cost around £7,000. Other notable designers and tradespeople included James Fagan & Sons which carried out much of the ironwork with the exception of the cross on the apse which was by Skidmore of Coventry.

Historically, the original parish would have been much larger encompassing the areas of Sandymount, Ballsbridge, Ringsend and Irishtown before the parishes were divided into their modern areas with dedicated churches built in each including St. Patrick's Church, Ringsend, St Mary's Church, Haddington Road and St. Mary Star of the Sea Church, Sandymount.

The church was originally intended to have a spire but owing to issues around cost, the spire was never executed as planned and in 1910 a decision was made to finish the tower with four matching finials on each corner and an ornamental parapet. These were executed to the design of William Henry Byrne from 1913–1914 who also did work on the sacristy at this time.

Harry Clarke designed two stained glass outer light windows depicting Saint Rita and Saint Bernard for the south aisle of the church in 1924 while the centre window of the three was designed by William MacBride and depicts a weeping Mary.

Clarke also designed a window for the nave of the church depicting the baptism of Jesus.

Another fine stained glass windows in the church by Michael Healy features Saint Patrick, Saint Feidhlim and Saint Eithne.

A window was also created by Franz Mayer of Munich.

Between 1877–1878, parochial houses were built adjacent to the church in red brick also to the design of the original architect George Ashlin.

=== Gallery ===
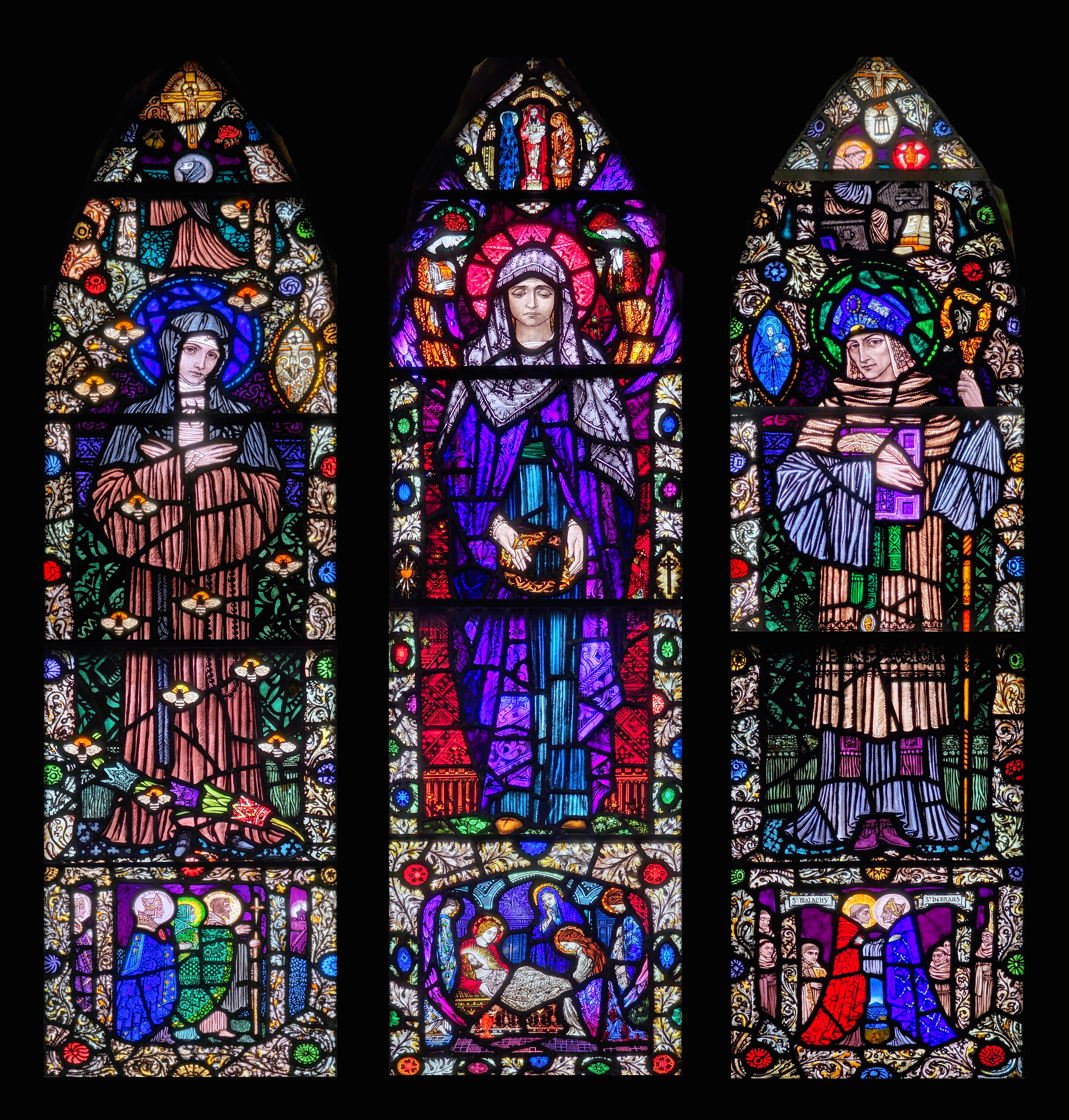
Harry Clarke (L & R) and William McBride (Centre) Window, St. Rita (L), St. Bernard (R), Mary Magdalene (Centre)

Baptism of Jesus in the nave by Harry Clarke

Nave of the church

== See also ==
- List of Irish state funerals
