= Michael Curran =

Michael Curran may refer to:

- Michael Curran (politician), former member of the South Dakota House of Representatives
- Michael D. Curran, member of the Illinois House of Representatives
- Michael J. Curran, Irish priest
- Mike Curran (born 1944), American ice hockey goaltender
