= Michael Riordan =

Michael or Mike Riordan may refer to:

- Michael Riordan (physicist) (born 1946), American physicist and historian
- Michael H. Riordan (born 1951), American economist
- Michael Paul Riordan (1789–1862), Christian Brother
- Mike Riordan (basketball) (born 1945), American basketball player
- Mike Riordan (American football), American football player

== See also ==
- Michael O'Riordan (1917–2006), founder of the Communist Party of Ireland
- Michael O'Riordan (priest) (1857–1919), Irish priest
