= Graigue =

Graigue may refer to several places in Ireland:

- Graigue, Dorrha, County Tipperary, a townland
- Graigue, any one of eleven other townlands in County Tipperary; see List of townlands of County Tipperary
- Graiguenamanagh or Graignamanagh, a town in County Kilkenny is commonly referred to as Graigue.
- Graigue, County Offaly, a townland; see List of townlands of County Offaly
