= St Mary's Church, Crumlin =

Protestant church in Dublin, Ireland

St. Mary's Church
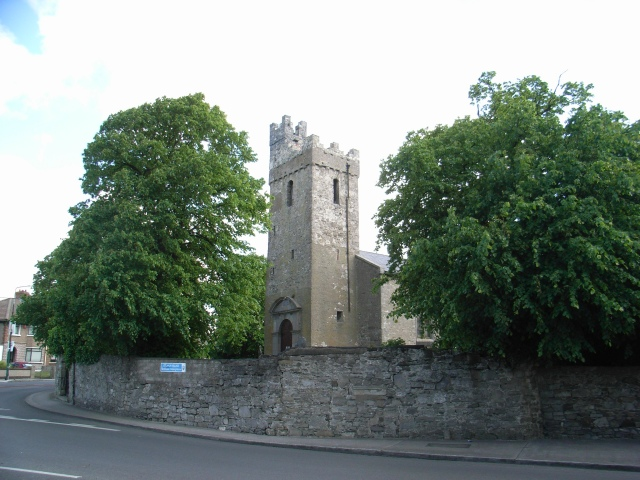
- Interactive map of the St. Mary's Church area

General information
- Type: Church
- Architectural style: Gothic
- Location: Crumlin, Dublin, Ireland
- Construction started: 1710 (Georgian additions to medieval church)

Technical details
- Material: Calp limestone

Design and construction
- Developer: Board of First Fruits (1817)

St Mary's is a Church of Ireland church in Crumlin, Dublin, Ireland. It is included on the Record of Protected Structures maintained by Dublin City Council.

== History ==
The modern church was constructed in 1817 with a £1,000 loan from the Board of First Fruits. A new nave and chancel were built and incorporated the tower and belfry of a much older medieval church. It originally formed part of the manor of Newcastle Lyons and was a prebend of St Patrick's Cathedral.

The tower can be seen clearly in a 1795 illustration of the area by engraver Francis Jukes amongst a number of two storey houses in a mainly rural setting.

The circular enclosure area of the church would indicate that it was originally built in an ecclesiastical setting and possibly pre Norman. The site would have originally included a moat.

The church is recorded during the royal visit of 1615 when William Cogan is noted as curate.

The church door features a broken pediment similar to older churches of the Georgian era in Dublin such as St. Matthew's Church, Ringsend which was likely added around 1710.

The limestone rubble wall surrounding the grounds of the church was built in the 1720s and was restored in the 1820s following the completion of the new church. An act of Parliament, the Dublin Inclosure Act 1818 (58 Geo. 3. c. 27 Pr.) enclosed the grounds surrounding the church which previously acted as a form of local common.

In 1878, a stained glass window was erected in the church by Mayer & Co in honour of Sir Frederick Shaw, 3rd Baronet.

=== Cemetery ===
The oldest of the headstones standing in the graveyard in modern times dates to 'Elenor Higgens' of 1622.

In John D'Alton's, The History of the County of Dublin (1838), he references tombstones at that time with the names of Deanes of Ravensthorpe, Northamptonshire and of Pinnock, in Gloucestershire. He also references one in 1699 to Eliza, daughter of Maurice Cuffe, of the county Clare and to the Purcells, from 1691.

Joseph Deane later inherited most of the area surrounding the church on the death of his father Joseph Deane in 1699 and constructed the Georgian Crumlin House which still stands as of 2024 and now forms part of the Salesian provincial house.

=== New church ===
The church was replaced by a nearby new church (53.3231°N 6.3186°W) designed by McDonnell & Dixon in 1942.

Canon Walter Burrows, who had been appointed in 1937, presided over the planning and construction of the new church and carried out its consecration in 1942.
