= Ciaran O'Carroll =

Irish Catholic priest

- Monsignor
- Archdiocese: Dublin

Personal details
- Born: Mount Merrion, Dublin, Ireland
- Education: Gonzaga College; Clonliffe College; University College Dublin; Angelicum University; Gregorian University

Monsignor Ciaran O'Carroll is an Irish Catholic priest who serves as Episcopal Vicar for Priests of the Archdiocese of Dublin and was formerly Rector of the Pontifical Irish College in Rome.

From Mount Merrion in Dublin, Fr. O'Carroll studied for the priesthood in Clonliffe College and also at University College Dublin before further studies in Rome, graduating from the Angelicum University, Rome, and the Gregorian University, Rome. O'Carroll holds a Doctorate in Church History. He has lectured in Clonliffe College and also at Maynooth College.

As a priest in the Dublin Diocese, O’Carroll served as parish priest of Saggart, Rathcoole, and Brittas. He worked in Clonliffe for the Archbishop of Dublin as the Episcopal Vicar for Evangelisation, and also served as the Administrator of the Catholic University Church on St Stephen's Green, Dublin.

O'Carroll was appointed Rector of the Irish College in 2011 and Episcopal Vicar for Priests of the Archdiocese of Dublin in 2020.

O'Carroll is a first-cousin of the late broadcaster Marian Finucane and presided over her funeral mass in January 2020

O'Carroll is currently parish priest for parish of Donnybrook and is based at the Church of the Sacred Heart, Donnybrook.

== Publications ==
- Ciaran O'Carroll, Paul Cardinal Cullen: Portrait of a Practical Nationalist, Veritas Books, 2009.
