= Ailesbury Road =

Residential street, Dublin, Ireland

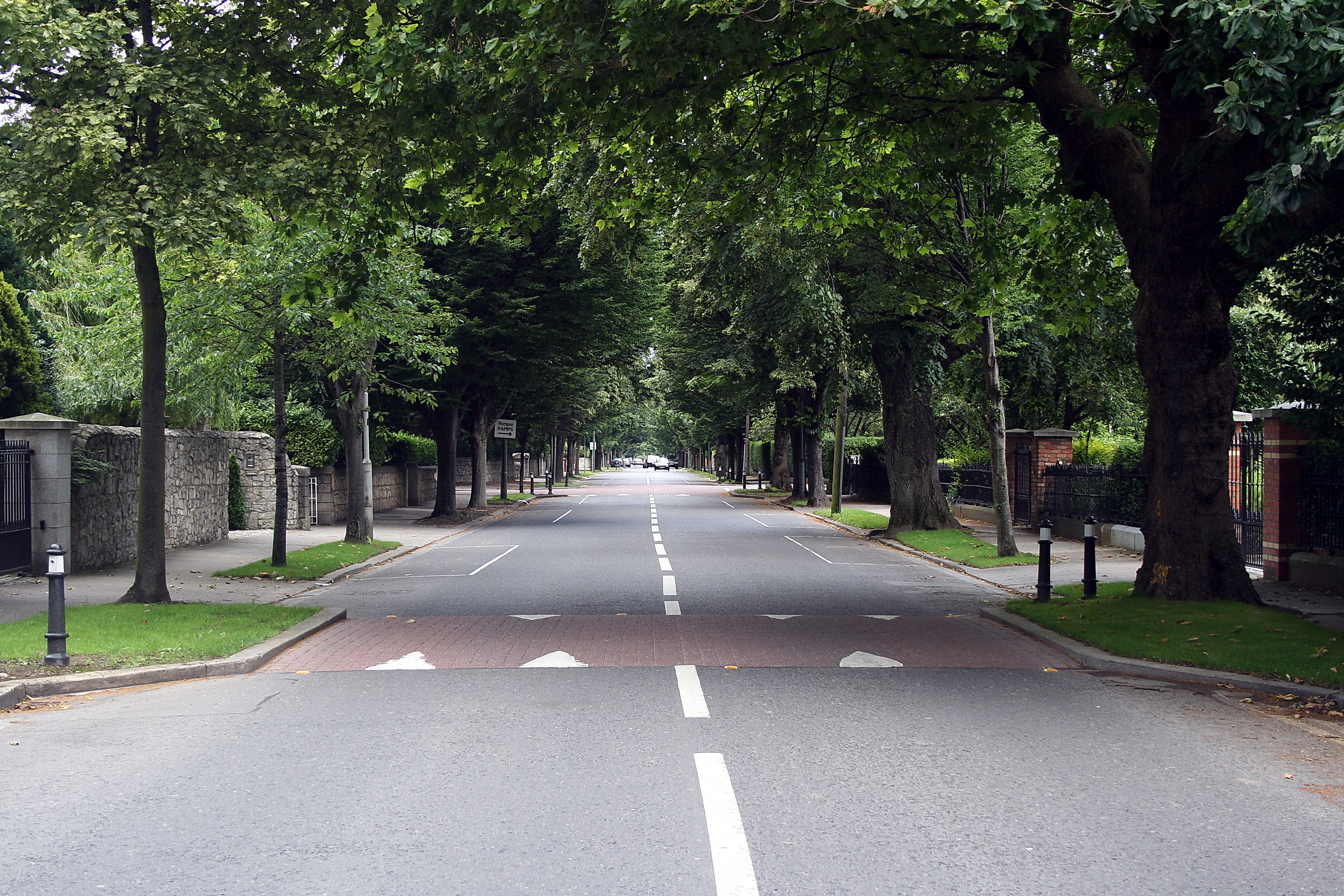

- Location within Dublin
- Native name: Bóthar Aylesbury (Irish)
- Namesake: George Brudenell-Bruce, 2nd Marquess of Ailesbury
- Length: 1.3 km (0.81 mi)
- Width: 16 metres (52 ft)
- Postal code: D04
- Coordinates: 53.320024°N 6.221490°W
- West end: Arthur Morrison monument, Anglesea Road
- East end: Sydney Parade Avenue

Other
- Known for: embassies, St Michael's College

Ailesbury Road (Bóthar Aylesbury in Irish), is a tree-lined avenue in the affluent Dublin 4 area in Dublin, Ireland. It links Sydney Parade Station on Sydney Parade Avenue and the Church of the Sacred Heart, Donnybrook at the junction of Anglesea Road. Historically, many embassies and diplomatic residences have been located on the road, including the striking residence of the French Ambassador, the embassy of the People's Republic of China, and the Japanese embassy (before it relocated to the nearby Merrion Centre).

From Ailesbury Road, Shrewsbury Road forms a link to Merrion Road, though Ailesbury Road also meets Merrion Road near its eastern end. Other neighbouring street names include Ailesbury Drive, Ailesbury Park, Ailesbury Gardens and Ailesbury Grove.

Reflecting the high property price tags in the area, Ailesbury Road is the second-most expensive property on the Irish Monopoly board, being one of the two "purple" property squares.

== History ==
=== Danish massacre ===
In 1879, the discovery of the remains of 600 people was made at a mound on Ailesbury Road which is believed to date back to a bloody massacre by the Danes in the 9th to 10th century. The bodies were removed and buried in the nearby Donnybrook Cemetery.

=== Development ===
Ailesbury Road was planned in the middle of the 19th century as a residential road in southeast Dublin, within the Pembroke Township. It was named for George Brudenell-Bruce, 2nd Marquess of Ailesbury, who had married Mary Herbert, a daughter of the Earl of Pembroke. When first built, Ailesbury Road was then the longest straight road in Dublin.

The original design set for houses to be built on this road is evident in numbers 1 through 51 on the eastern end of the road. These are built of red brick and granite, with a uniform flight of granite steps leading to the hall door, and iron railings bordering the front garden. Numbers 1 through 27 inclusive were built by Alderman Meade, whose designs here and elsewhere in Dublin are characterised by circular granite pillars at the entrance gate. His own residence, which he also designed, is now St Michael's School at the Merrion end of the road.

=== Number 53 ===
The former French embassy and ambassadorial residence at number 53 is one of the most exclusive addresses on the road. Formerly known as Mytilene, No. 53 differs from the "standard" building forms of numbers 1 through 51. It is much larger, detached and standing in a wooded garden, and has twin gates flanked by square granite pillars, with a granite balustrade and wide steps leading to a pillared front entrance. This house is constructed of white bricks with inset designs of black bricks and an ornamental rosette frieze, also made of bricks in the same porcelain finish.

The house was purchased by the French Government in the 1930s and became the residence of the first Minister for France to Ireland, Monsieur Alphand. This remained so until 2008 when the French Government decided to sell off the house with a price tag of €60 million making it the most expensive house ever to be put up for sale in Ireland, just after a house on Shrewsbury (just off Ailesbury Road) that sold in 2005 for €58 million. The transaction did not take place though and the house remains the Residence of the French ambassador to Ireland. It has seen the passing of many French Presidents, from General de Gaulle in 1969 to President François Mitterrand in 1988, President Nicolas Sarkozy in 2008 and President François Hollande in 2016.

== Amenities ==
St Michael's College, a voluntary secondary school for boys with an associated primary school co-located, is situated on the road.

== See also ==
- List of streets and squares in Dublin
