= St. Mary's Church, Donnybrook =

Former protestant church in Dublin, Ireland

Coordinates: 53°19′29″N 6°13′48″W

St. Mary's Church
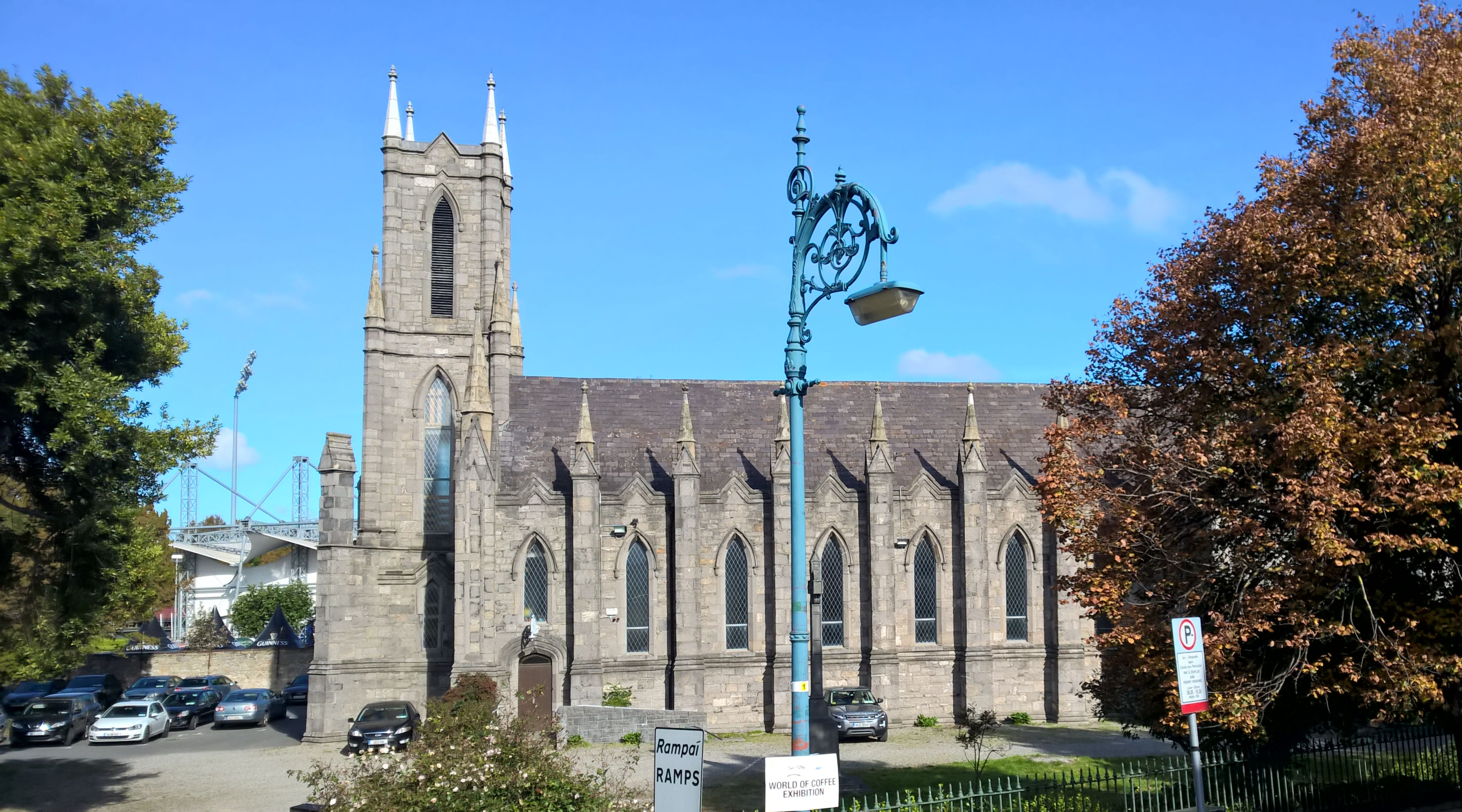
- Side view of the church in 2016
- Interactive map of the St. Mary's Church area

General information
- Status: Church
- Location: Anglesea Road, Donnybrook, Ireland
- Estimated completion: 1827
- Owner: Royal Dublin Society

Technical details
- Material: calp limestone, granite dressings

Design and construction
- Architect: John Semple

St. Mary's Church was a Church of Ireland church in Donnybrook, Dublin entered via Anglesea Road which now operates as a part of the campus of the Royal Dublin Society.

== History ==
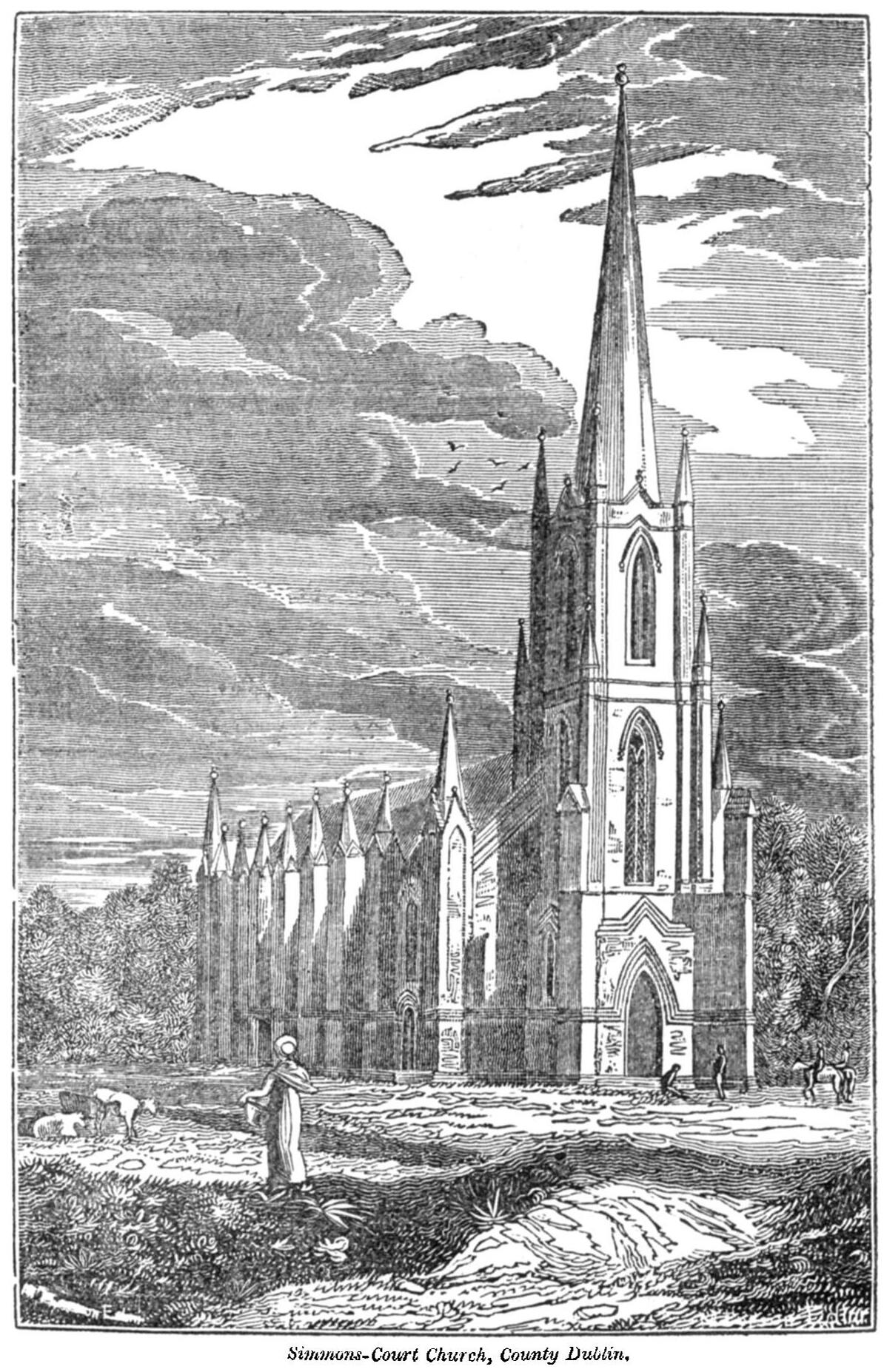
An illustration of the Church in 1832 from the Dublin Penny Journal showing the spire.

The church was built to the design of John Semple in 1827 near the site of a much earlier church which was demolished soon after. The church was consecrated in April 1830. It was constructed with the aid of a loan of £4,154 from the Board of First Fruits.

Simmonscourt castle would have been in the immediate vicinity and would have influenced the choice of location. The steeple was damaged in a storm in 1839 and not rebuilt again until 1859.

The church was de-consecrated by Archbishop of Dublin, Michael Jackson, on 3 July 2020. Following the closure of the church the Parish was merged with Irishtown, to form the Irishtown and Donnybrook Union of Parishes, and served by St. Matthew's Parish Church.

In the grounds is the War Memorial Cross, commemorating parishioners who died in the First World War, Second World War and Korean War.

The altar furniture from the Church of Ireland Training College, Kildare Place, was given to St. Mary's following the College of Educations move Rathmines in 1969. It was returned to the college following the churches closure in 2020 and was moved to and rededicated in DCU All Hallows College Chapel, by Archbishop Michael Jackson of Dublin, for use by Church of Ireland Centre and community there.

Canon Arthur Gore Ryder DD, was the first Rector of Donnybrook (1867-1889) following St. Mary's separation from the archdeaconry of Dublin. Other clergy included Rector Rev. Dr. Robert Walsh and the Rev. Edward (Ted) Ardis.

In 2022, the Royal Dublin Society acquired the church for €4m.

=== Notable parishioners ===
Two ancestors of Meghan Markle, Mary McCue and Thomas Bird, an English soldier, were married at St Mary's church, Donnybrook, in 1860.

Beaver Henry Blacker was curate in charge of Donnybrook from 1845 to 1856.
