= Gloucestershire Notes and Queries =

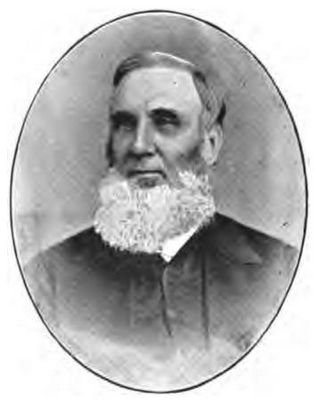
The Rev. Beaver Henry Blacker.

Gloucestershire Notes and Queries was an illustrated quarterly magazine of the history and antiquities of Gloucestershire published from 1879 under the editorship of the Reverend Beaver Henry Blacker (1821–90). The first volume was published in 1881. After the death of Blacker, the editor was the solicitor, genealogist, and publisher, William Phillimore Watts Phillimore, founder of the eponymous publishing firm.

== Volumes ==
Volumes were published as follows:

- Volume I, 1879–81. Editor Rev. Beaver H. Blacker
- Volume II, 1882–84. Editor Rev. Beaver H. Blacker
- Volume III, 1885–87. Editor Rev. Beaver H. Blacker
- Volume IV, 1888–90. Editor Rev. Beaver H. Blacker
- Volume V. 1891-1893. 1894. Editor W. P. W. Phillimore
- Volume VI, 1894–95.
- Volume VII, 1896–97.
- Volume VIII, 1901.
- Volume IX, 1902.
