= Michael O'Riordan (priest) =

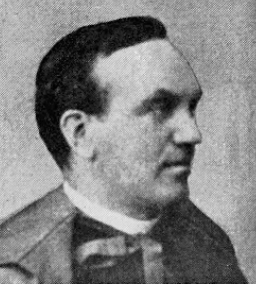
Photo of Michael O'Riordan (1857–1919) from The Catholic Encyclopedia and its Makers, 1917, pages 128–129

Michael O'Riordan was an Irish priest who served as Rector of the Pontifical Irish College, Rome. Born in Killmurray, Co. Limerick in 1857 he attended the Diocesan School in Limerick, before going to Rome to study for the priesthood. He was ordained in 1883 and served as a priest in the Diocese of Westminster, before returning to Rome to study, an accomplished student he gained a Doctorate of Divinity, Doctorate of Canon Law and a PhD. He was appointed Professor at St Munchin's College, Limerick. He was appointed Rector of the Irish College in Rome in 1905. He was awarded an Honorary PhD from the University of Louvain. He was influential between the Irish Church and the Vatican and used his influence to dissuade the Vatican from condemning the 1916 Easter Rising His brother Denis Riordan was a tenant farmer.

Monsignor O'Riordan died in 1919 His papers are held in the Irish College in Rome. He was succeeded as Rector by John O'Hagan who had served as his Vice-Rector.
