= Board of First Fruits =

Anglican ecclesiastical institution in Ireland (1711–1833)

The Board of First Fruits (Irish: Bord na Prímhide) was an institution of the Church of Ireland that was established in 1711 by Anne, Queen of Great Britain to build and improve churches and glebe houses in Ireland. This was funded from taxes collected on clerical incomes which were in turn funded by tithes.

The board was replaced in 1833 by the Board of Ecclesiastical Commissioners.

== History ==
From the English Reformation in the 16th century, most Irish people chose to remain Roman Catholic and had by now to pay tithes valued at about 10% of an area's agricultural produce, to maintain and fund the established state church, the Anglican Church of Ireland, to which only a small minority of the population converted. Protests against this situation led to the Tithe war in the early 19th century.

In 1711, Queen Anne agreed that the tax on clerical incomes be given to the Church of Ireland for the building of new churches and Glebe Houses. To that effect, with Jonathan Swift's influence, the Board of First Fruits was founded.

During the first 70 years of its existence, the board purchased glebe lands for benefices at a total cost of £3,543. It also assisted the building of forty-five glebe houses with gifts of £4,080.

In 1778, the Irish Parliament agreed a grant of £6,000, followed by £1,500 in 1779–1780, £6,000 in 1781–1782, £3,000 in 1783–1784 and £5,000 each year from 1785 to 1800. During the period 1791–1803, the board spent £55,600 towards the building of 88 churches and 116 glebe houses.

The grants were maintained after the Act of Union 1800, but the act of parliament in 1808 saw a consolidation of the funds and allowed the board to also repair old churches and glebe houses.

From 1808, the annual grant doubled to £10,000 and massively increased to £60,000 each year between 1810 and 1816. Thereafter, the grant was halved between 1817 and 1821, finally being reduced to £10,000 each year in 1822–1823.

In the twenty years following the Act of Union, a total of £807,648 was paid out in grants to purchases glebe lands in 193 benefices, the building of 550 glebe houses, and the building, rebuilding and enlargement of 697 churches.

The Church Temporalities Act 1833 put an end to the Board of First Fruits and The Board of Ecclesiastical Commissioners took over.

== Architects ==
Many architects worked for the Board of First Fruits. The following lists a few and is not exhaustive:

- George Richard Pain
- James Pain
- Joseph Welland
- John Bowden
- John Semple
- William Farrell

== Buildings ==
Many churches and glebe houses were constructed or improved with funding from the Board of First Fruits.

=== Churches ===
==== In County Armagh ====
- Madden, County Armagh, (Rebuilt 1816)
- St Luke's, Ballymoyer, (Built 1822)

==== In County Cork ====
- Dromagh, near Banteer, (Built 1822)*
- St. George's, Mitchelstown, (Rebuild of 1830 partially funded by Board)*
- Marshalstown (in ruins), near the River Funshion, (Built c1810)*
- St Mary's, Castletownroche, (Built c1825)*

==== In County Dublin ====
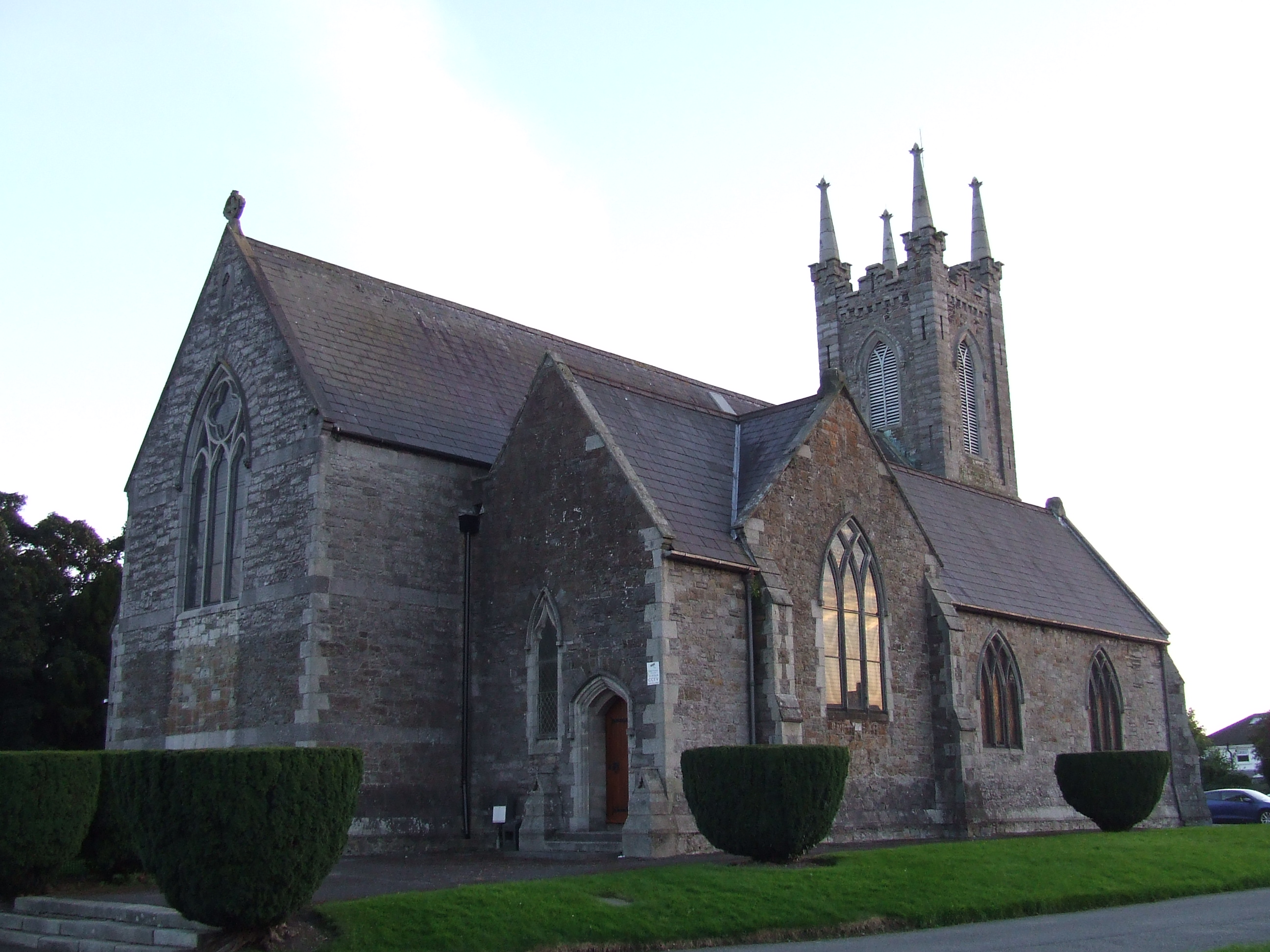
St Bridget's, Castleknock 2012

- St Brigid's, Castleknock, Fingal, (Re-built in 1810)
- St Mary's Church, Crumlin, rebuilt with the help of a £1,000 loan (1817)
- Christ Church, Taney Parish, Dundrum, (Built 1818)
- St. Philip and St. James Church, Booterstown, (Built 1821)
- St. Mary's Church, Donnybrook, with the help of a loan of £4,154 (1827)
- St. Maelruain's Church, Tallaght, (Re-built in 1829)
- Monkstown Church, Dublin, (Built 1830s)
- St. Marys Chapel of Ease, Dublin, (Built 1830)

==== In County Galway ====
- Portumna, (Built 1832)*
- Kilkerrin, near Glenamaddy, (Built 1784)*

==== In County Kildare ====
- Saint John's Church, Ballymore Eustace, (Built 1820)*

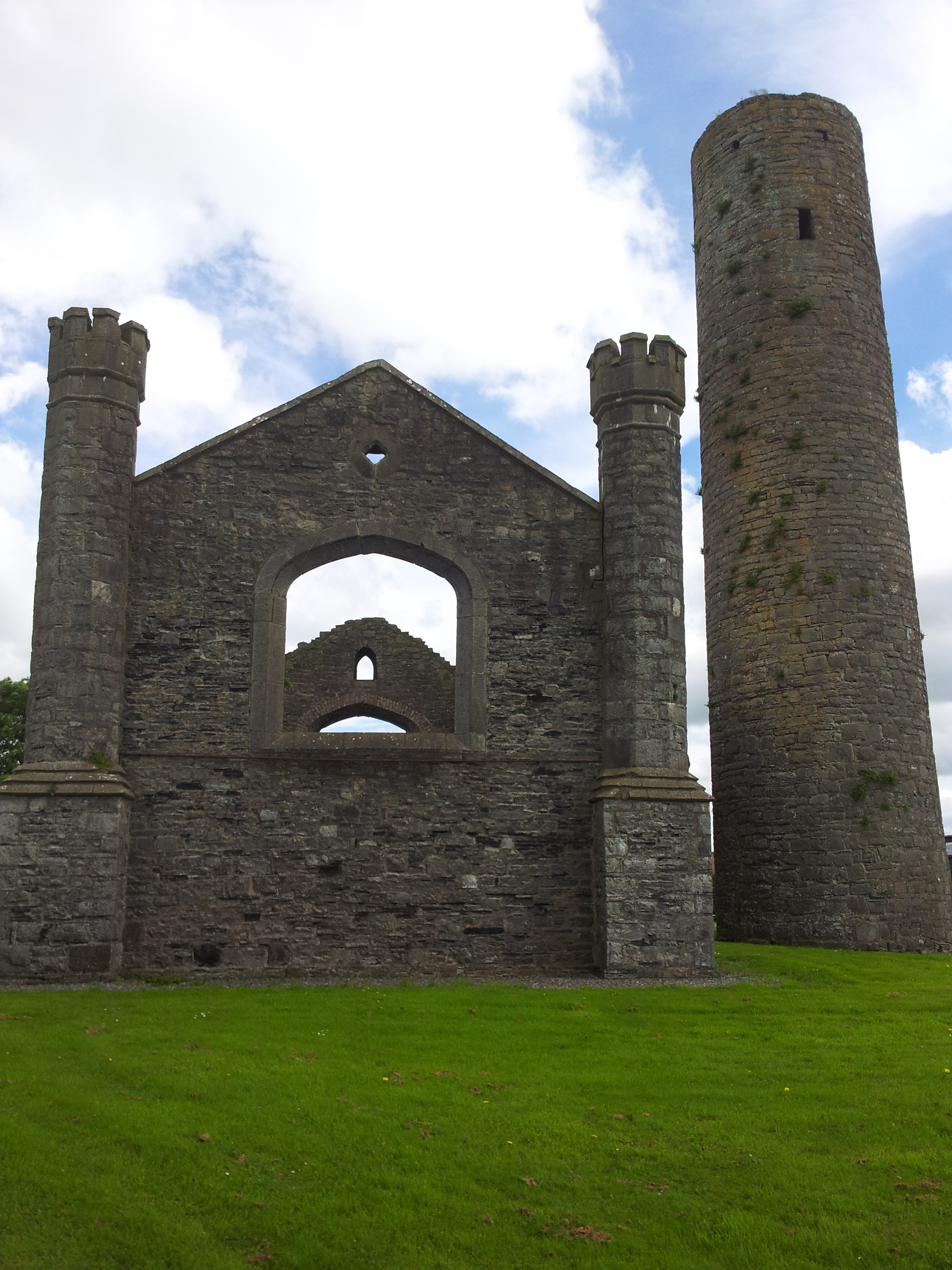
Church at Taghadoe, Co. Kildare, built 1831. The round tower is from the 8th century AD.

- Taghadoe, near Maynooth, (Built 1831)

==== In County Kerry ====
- St Cartach's, Castlemaine, County Kerry, (Built 1816)*
- Templenoe, (Built 1816)*
- Kilcolman, Milltown, (Built 1819)*

==== In County Longford ====
- St Thomas', Rathmore near Lough Gowna, (Built 1829)

==== In County Mayo ====
- St. Mary's Crossmolina (built 1818–9)*

==== in County Offaly ====
- Dunkerrin, (Built 1820)*
- St Mary's, Shinrone, (Built 1821)*
- St Colman's, Cree (Built 1844)

==== In County Tipperary ====
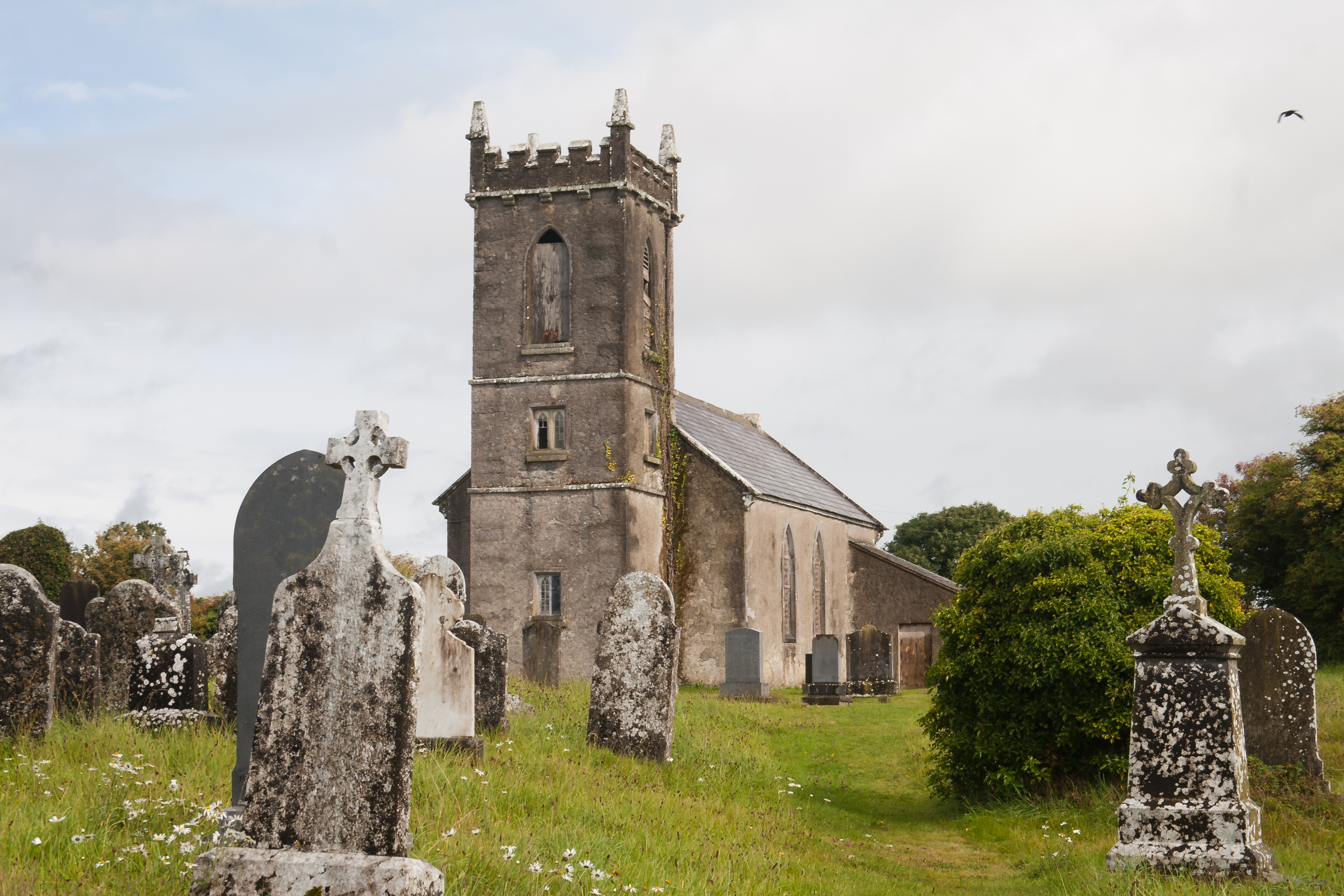
Church in Feigh West, built in 1813

- Ballynaclogh, on the Nenagh River, (Built 1815)*
- Borrisokane, (Built 1812) *
- St Burchin's, Ballyhenry, County Tipperary, (Built 1814)*
- St Cronan's, Roscrea, (Built 1812)*
- Dorrha, Graigue, Dorrha, (Built 1832)*
- Feigh West, near Borrisokane, (Built 1813)*
- Glebe (in ruins), (built c1790)*
- Holycross, (Built 1821)*
- St Kieran's, Cloughjordan, (Built 1837)*
- Kilfithmone, now part of the united parish "Templemore, Thurles and Kilfithmone", (Built 1821)*
- Kilruane, (Built 1820)*
- Kilbiller (in ruins), in the Borrisokane Forest (Built 1822)*
- Johnstown, Killodiernan, near Puckane (Built 1811)*
- Littleton, Bally Beg, (Built 1786)
- St Mary's, Thurles, (Built c1825)*
- St Michael's (in ruins), Cloonmore, Ballymackey, (Built 1815)*
- Modreeny (in ruins), (Built 1828)*
- St Ruadan's (in ruins) Curraghmore, on the grounds of Finnoe House, near Borrisokane,(Built c1815)*
- Terryglass, (Built 1808)*

==== In County Waterford ====
- Knockmahon Church (Monksland), Bunmahon. (Built ~1820)* Now the Copper Coast Visitor's Centre.
- St Andrew's, Dunmore East (Built 1817)*

==== In County Wexford ====
- St Mary's, Tintern, Saltmills (Built 1818)*
- St Paul's Church, Kildavin. (Built in 1811)
- St Peter's Church, Monart (Built 1805–1810)

=== Glebe Houses ===
- Clondrohid, County Cork
- Clondavaddog, County Donegal (Built c1795)
- Lorrha, County Tipperary (Built 1816)*
- Feigh West, County Tipperary (Built 1816)*
- Killeen, County Tipperary (Built 1816)*
- Dunkitt, County Kilkenny (Built 1817)*
- Ballymoyer, County Armagh (Built 1825)
- Loughkeen, County Tipperary (Built c1830)*
- Monart, County Wexford (Built 1805–1810) *
- Cloghran, Fingal, County Dublin (Built 1812)

An asterisk indicates that a building is featured on the website of the National Inventory of Architectural Heritage

== See also ==
- Ecclesiastical Commissioners
