= R825 road (Ireland) =

Regional road in south Dublin, Ireland

R825 road
- Bóthar R825
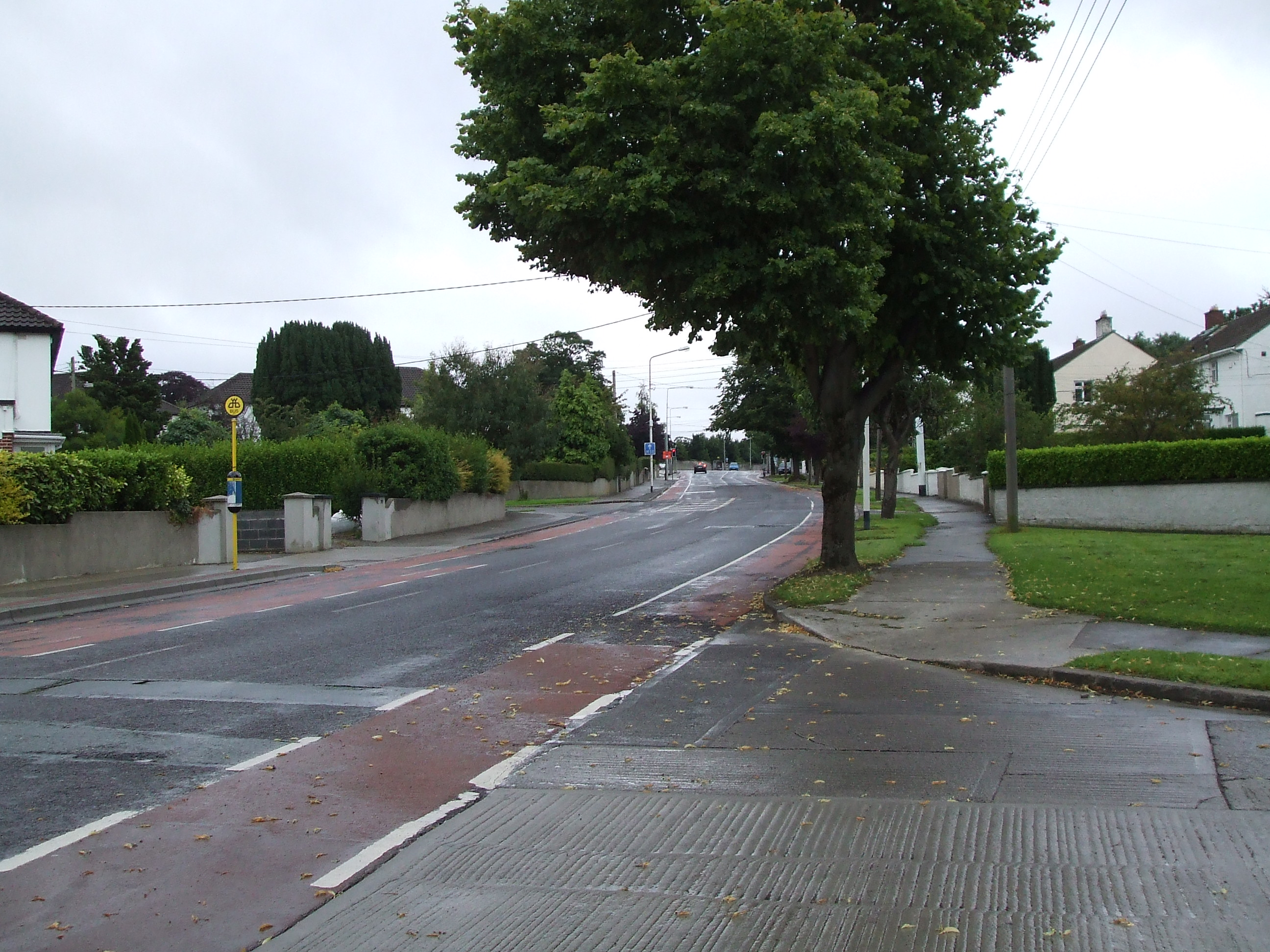
- Looking south on the Goatstown Road at the junction with Farmhill Park

Route information
- Length: 7.6 km (4.7 mi)

Location
- Country: Ireland
- Primary destinations: Dublin City; Start of route (R117, R824); Crosses the River Dodder at Clonskeagh Bridge; Dún Laoghaire–Rathdown; Clonskeagh; Goatstown (R112, R133); Drummartin, (R133); Kilmacud; Stillorgan (N11); Blackrock (N31)

Highway system
- Roads in Ireland; Motorways; Primary; Secondary; Regional

The R825 road is a regional road in south Dublin, Ireland. The road starts in Clonskeagh at the junction with the R117 (Milltown Road) and passes through Goatstown, Kilmacud and Stillorgan before ending at a junction with the N31 in Blackrock, County Dublin. The route is 7.6 km (4.7 mi) in length and is single carriageway apart from a small 2 lane section beside the N11.

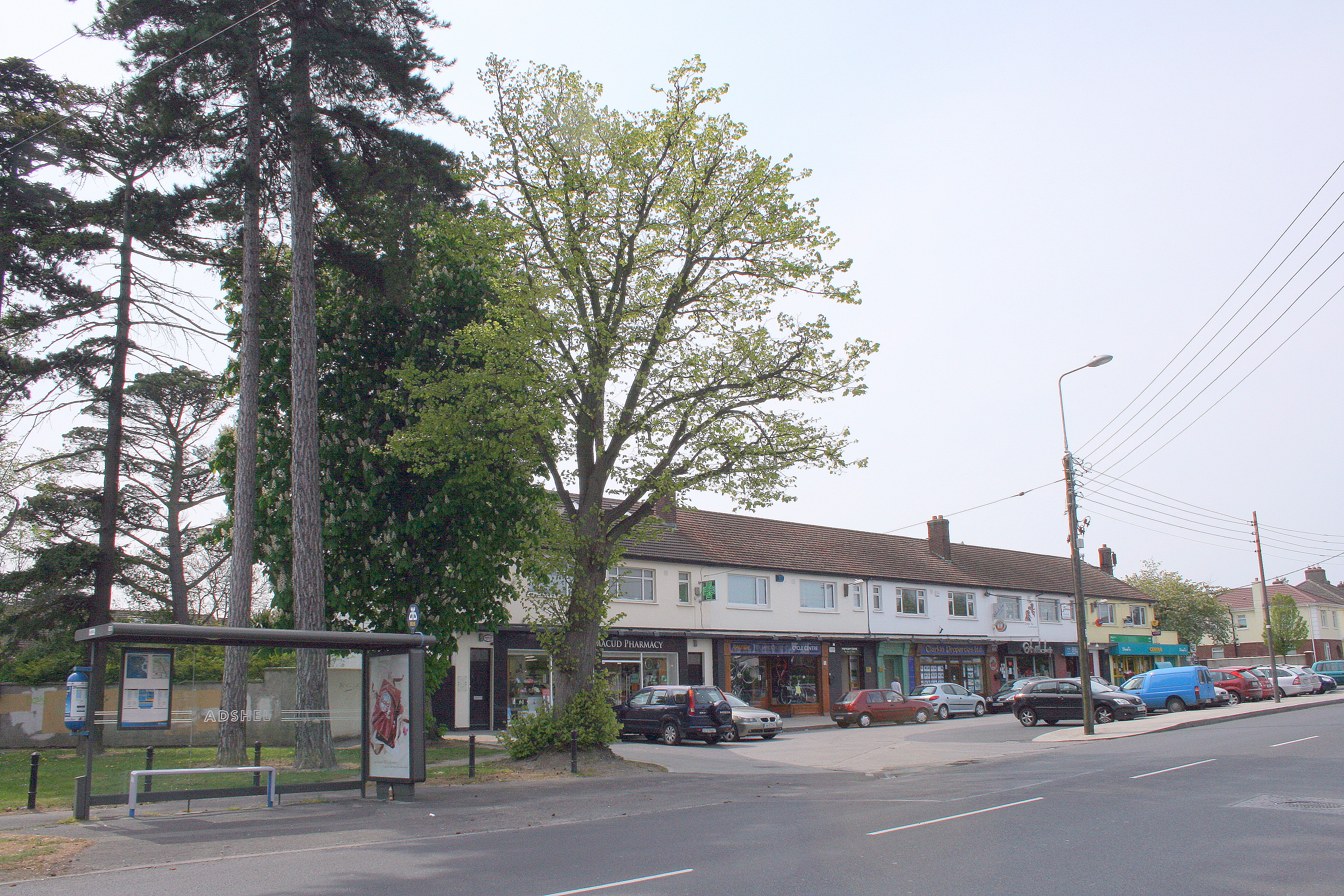
Lower Kilmacud Road on the R825

== Route ==
- The road starts at the junction of the R117 (Milltown Road from the west and Sandford Road from the north) and R824 (Eglinton Road). A bridge crosses the River Dodder shortly before a junction with the Beach Hill and Beaver Row road that connects to Donnybrook. The road is known as the Clonskeagh Road until it reaches the triangle in Clonskeagh.
- At the triangle, the road connects with Bird Avenue before continuing south as the Roebuck Road.
- Further along the Roebuck road leads off to the west before connecting with the R112 at Foster Avenue while the R825 stays south known as the Goatstown Road.
- The first section of the route terminates at the crossroads in Goatstown as the road continues south as the R133, while east and west runs the R112.
- Just under 1 km further south the road starts again at the junction with the R133 and heads in a westerly direction towards Stillorgan. The road is briefly known as Drummartin Road at this point before it connects with the old route of the Lower Kilmacud Road.
- After Stillorgan, the road crosses the N11 and is known as Stillorgan Park for 1 km before the road takes a left at a T-Junction and heads north as Carysfort Avenue.
- The road terminates at the end of Carysfort Avenue where the road joins up to the N31 at Frascati Road, Blackrock.

== See also ==
- Roads in Ireland
- National primary road
- National secondary road
