= Park Avenue, Dublin =

Road in Dublin, Ireland

Park Avenue
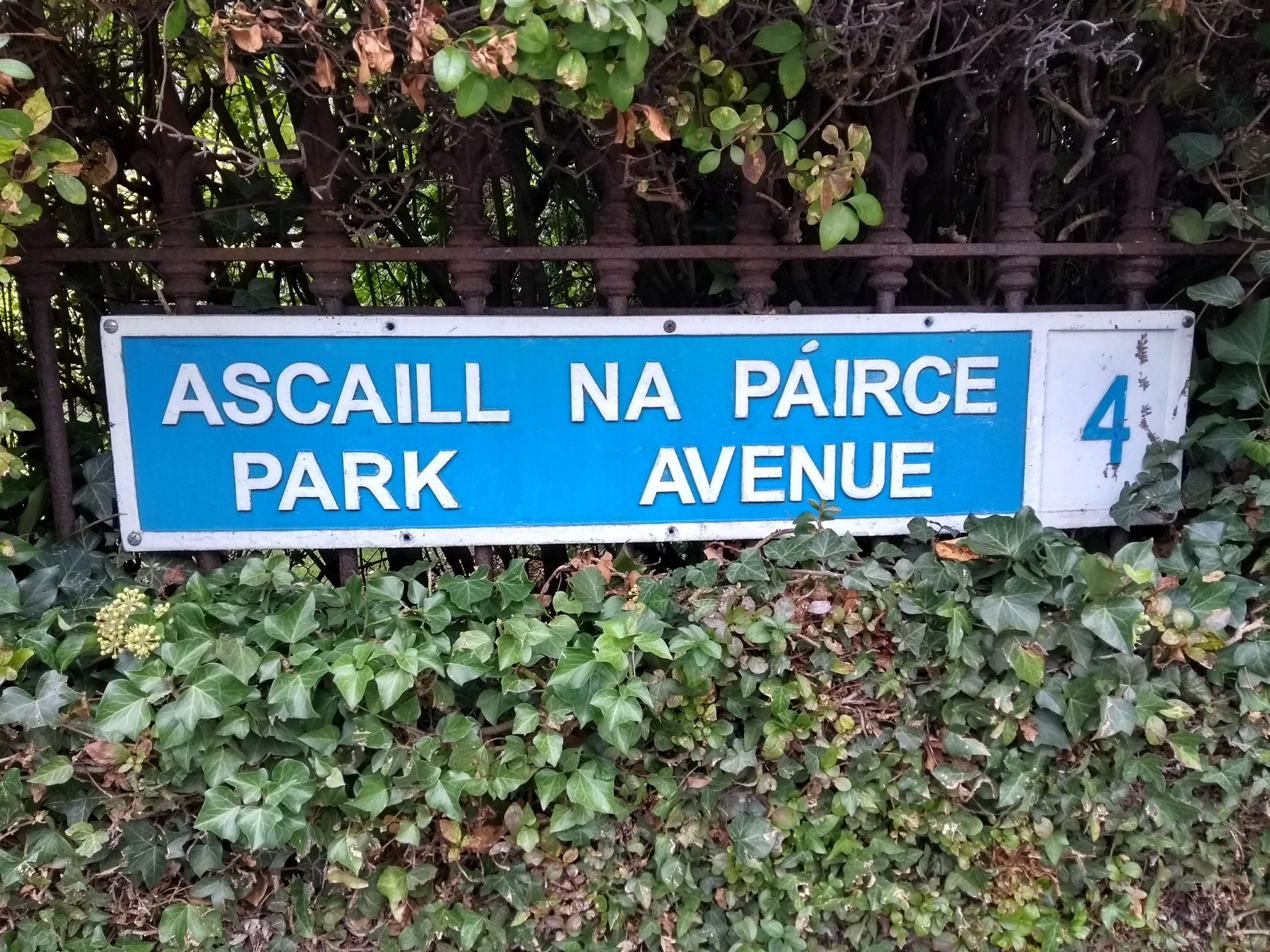
- Sign with Dublin 4 post code

- Location within Dublin
- Native name: Ascaill na Páirce (Irish)
- Namesake: Parkland
- Length: 850 m (2,790 ft)
- Width: 13 metres (43 ft)
- Location: Dublin, Ireland
- Postal code: D04
- Coordinates: 53°19′31.22″N 6°12′47.08″W
- north end: Gilford Road
- south end: Sydney Parade Avenue

Other
- Known for: Expensive houses

Park Avenue (Irish: Ascaill na Páirce) in the suburb of Sandymount, Dublin 4, Ireland is the name of a road joining Sydney Parade Avenue to Gilford Road. It is home to a number of cricket and rugby union grounds including Pembroke Cricket Club, the Railway Union Sports Club and Monkstown Rugby Club. Of architectural note is the Church of St John (Church of Ireland), noted for its French Bath stone's decay due to its proximity to the sea. The church is on an island at the junction of Park Avenue and St Johns Road, which continues east towards the sea at Sandymount Strand.

Park Avenue of Sandymount, like its famous namesake in New York City, is noted for its high property prices and wealthy residents. For example, in 2006, number 70 - a Victorian red-brick semi-detached house with a large garden - made headlines by selling for the large sum of €9,500,000. However, the same house was priced at €5,925,000 by 2011.

== History ==
Park Avenue runs through an area which was, in former times, known as The Marsh, being a 13-acre (53,000 m^{2}) pond or lough in the estuary of the River Liffey.

In 1820, twelve dwellings stood in Park Avenue, which was originally known as Cottage Park Avenue.

The Sisters of Mercy had a convent, orphanage and school on Park Avenue which was founded in 1856 and reference to their activities is made in the novel Ulysses. When high property prices made sales of their grounds attractive, this posed a dilemma for the religious order but 3.15 acres (12,700 m^{2}) were sold for the construction of 78 houses in high-density development.

== See also ==
- List of streets and squares in Dublin
