= Feigh West =

Townland in County Tipperary, Ireland

Coordinates: 53.0390°N 8.0925°W

Feigh West (Irish: Fia Thiar) is a townland in the Barony of Ormond Lower, County Tipperary, Ireland. It is located north east of Borrisokane.

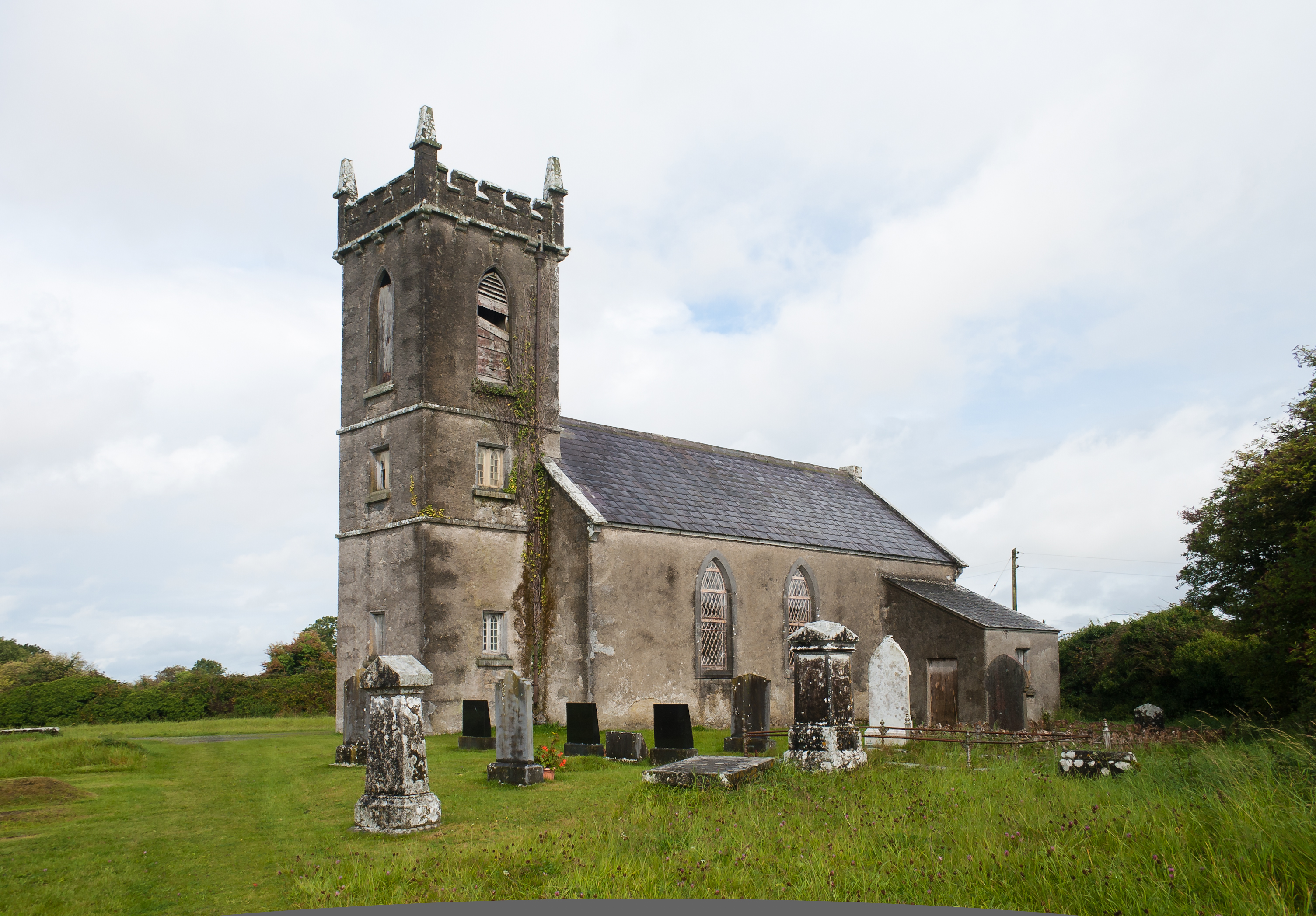
Disused Protestant church, built in 1813.

Feigh West is located on a hillock at the site of a ruined medieval church of rectangular shape, 19m × 7.5m. The church is surrounded by a grave yard with headstones dated from the 18th to 20th century. East of the ruins is a disused church of the Church of Ireland, erected in 1813 with funds of the Board of First Fruits. South-east of the Protestant church is a former two-storey glebe house, built in 1816 and also financed with the assistance of the Board of the First Fruits. It is now used as a private home.
