= Shrewsbury Road =

Residential road in Dublin, Ireland

- Location within Dublin
- Native name: Bóthar Sriúsbaire (Irish)
- Namesake: Charles Chetwynd-Talbot, 19th Earl of Shrewsbury
- Length: 550 m (1,800 ft)
- Width: 16 metres (52 ft)
- Location: Ballsbridge, Dublin, Ireland
- Postal code: D04
- Coordinates: 53.3218°N 6.2234°W
- north end: Merrion Road
- south end: Ailesbury Road

Other
- Known for: Expensive properties, and embassies

Shrewsbury Road (/ˈʃroʊzbriː/, /ˈʃruːzbəriː/; Bóthar Sriúsbaire in Irish) is a street in Dublin, Ireland, and was the sixth-most-expensive street in the world in 2007, ahead of more well-known streets such as the Via Suvretta in St. Moritz and Carolwood Drive in Beverly Hills. Located in Ballsbridge, Dublin 4, the street is bordered to the north by Merrion Road and to the south by Ailesbury Road.

== History and naming ==
The street is named in honour of the 1874 marriage of George Herbert, 13th Earl of Pembroke (owner of land around Ballsbridge), to Lady Gertrude Chetwynd-Talbot, a cousin of Charles Chetwynd-Talbot, 19th Earl of Shrewsbury. Traditionally, Shrewsbury Road has been home to Dublin's medical and legal professionals, but over the years the clientele shifted away from it and now the stretch houses both dot-com millionaires and property developers as well. The street has 26 residences; one of these, Walford, made headlines in 2005 for being the most expensive house ever sold in the country, for a reported €58 million. As a result of the Irish financial crisis in the late 2000s, the value of most properties on the street more than halved, but as of 2013, sales have been in excess of €4 million.

The Chester Beatty Library used to be on the road.

Among the residents of the street are telecommunications billionaire Denis O'Brien, property developer Derek Quinlan, and businessman Seán Dunne, who once owned 'Walford.' The street is also the location of the ambassadorial residences of South Africa, Finland and Germany.

=== Walford ===
Built in 1902 during the Edwardian era, the red brick house was styled with the Edwardian architectural fashion in mind, in keeping with the characteristics of the district. Although the house is only 4,000 sq ft (370 m^{2}), the property was seen by many investors as having massive developmental potential due to the total area of 1.8 acres (7,300 m^{2}). This potential was noticed in 2005 when the death of the former owner, Patrick A. Duggan, led to an executor sale. Despite having a guide price of €35 million, the house eventually reached €58 million due to a rumoured six potential buyers vying to purchase the property. In the end, it was purchased by a company named Matsack Nominees, and it was widely reported in the media that the beneficiary of the sale was Gayle Killelea, wife of Sean Dunne. In 2008, the house went on the market with a guide price of €75 million, despite being valued around €40 million at the time due to the Irish property crash, and in September 2011 the house went on the market again for a price of €15 million, down €43 million from its sale value in 2005, but was withdrawn presumably because it never met the guide price.

In late 2016, a Cyprus-registered company, Yesreb Ltd, of which John Dunne, a son of Seán Dunne's first marriage, was said to be a director, sold Walford for €14.25 million to Celtic Trustees Ltd. Celtic Trustees is the sole trustee of the Merdon Trust, whose settlor is billionaire financier Dermot Desmond, and which was set up for the benefit of Mr Desmond's children. In 2018, Celtic Trustees Ltd secured planning permission to demolish Walford and replace it with 17,168 sq ft mansion, more than three times larger than Walford.

== Popular culture ==
Reflecting the high real estate values in the area, Shrewsbury is the most expensive property on the Irish Monopoly board, and is part of the dark blue set with nearby Ailesbury Road.
