= Tobias Kirby =

- Archbishop of Ephesus, Bishop of Lete
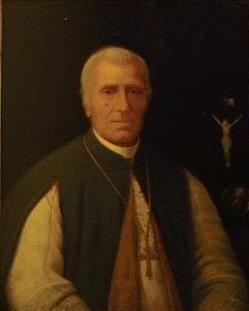

Orders
- Ordination: 1833

Personal details
- Born: 1 January 1804 Tallow, County Waterford
- Died: 20 January 1895 (aged 91) Rome, Italy
- Buried: Pontifical Irish College, Rome
- Denomination: Roman Catholic

Tobias Kirby (1 January 1804 – 20 January 1895) was an Irish Roman Catholic priest and Bishop.

== Life ==
Kirby was born in Tallow, County Waterford, Ireland, to David Kirby and Elizabeth Caplice. He was educated at St. John's College, Waterford. In 1827 he began studying at the Roman Colleges in Rome; one of his fellow students was Vincenzo Gioacchino Pecci, the future Pope Leo XIII.

In 1833 he was ordained a priest at the Archbasilica of St. John Lateran for service in his native diocese of Roman Catholic Diocese of Waterford and Lismore but he spent hardly any significant part of his long ministry there. In 1837 he was appointed Vice Rector of the Irish College and was accorded the title Monsignor in 1840. In 1849 he succeeded Cardinal Cullen as rector of the college. In total he spent 41 years as Rector and the College holds his entire collection of letters regarded by some as "one of the most important private collections for the history of the nineteenth century in the English speaking world."

In recognition of his long service and, partly as a consequence of his long friendship with the then reigning Pontiff, he was appointed titular bishop of Lete in 1881, and titular archbishop of Ephesus in 1885. When Kirby eventually retired in 1891 he was succeeded by Michael Kelly (1850-1940).

Kirby died in Rome on 20 January 1895, and was buried in Rome. Most of his papers are held at the Pontifical Irish College.
