= Pontifical Irish College =

Roman Catholic seminary in Rome

Coordinates: 41.8873°N 12.5021°E

Pontifical Irish College Rome
- Irish Coláiste Pontaifiúil na nGael
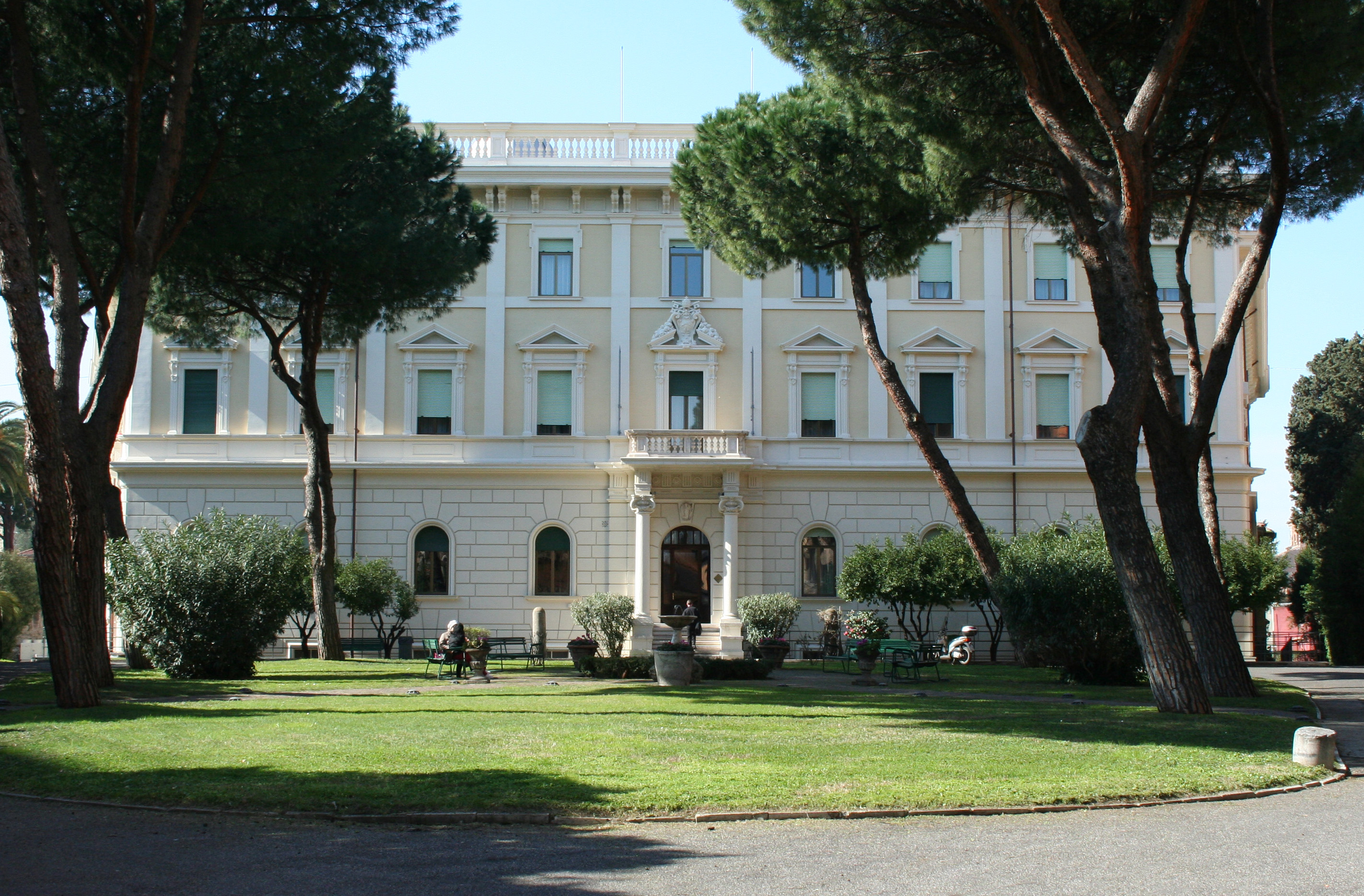
- Latin: Pontificum Collegium Hibernorum; Italian: Pontificio Collegio Irlandese
- Motto: Ut Christiani Ita et Romani Sitis
- Type: Seminary
- Established: 1628
- Affiliations: Jesuits (1635–1772)
- Religious affiliation: Roman Catholic
- Rector: Paul Finnerty
- Students: 60
- Location: Rome, Italy
- Nickname: Irish College Rome
- Website: http://www.irishcollege.org/

The Pontifical Irish College is a Catholic seminary in Rome for the training and education of priests. The college is located at #1, Via dei Santi Quattro, and serves as a residence for clerical students from all over the world. Designated a pontifical college in 1948, it is the last Irish College in continental Europe.

== Foundation and early history ==
In 1625, the Irish bishops, in an address to Pope Urban VIII, expressed a desire for a college for Irish students in Rome. Cardinal Ludovisi, who was Cardinal protector to Ireland, resolved to realize at his own expense the desire expressed to the pope by the Irish bishops. A house was rented opposite Sant' Isodoro and six students went into residence 1 January 1628. Eugene Callanan, archdeacon of Cashel, was the first rector, Luke Wadding being a sort of supervisor. Cardinal Ludovisi died in 1632; he was of a princely family with a large patrimony, and he made provision in his will for the college; it was to have an income of one thousand crowns a year; a house was to be purchased for it; and he left a vineyard as Castel Gandolfo where the students might pass their villeggiatura. The cardinal's will directed that the college should be placed under the charge of the Jesuits. Both the heirs and Wadding disputed that provision; a protracted lawsuit was finally decided in 1635 in favour of the Jesuits.

== Under the Jesuits ==
On 8 February 1635, the Jesuits took charge of the college, and governed it until 1772. A permanent residence was secured, which became the home of the Irish students until 1798, and is still the property of the college; it has given its name to the street in which it stands. The Jesuits found eight students before them; one of these, Philip Cleary, after a brilliant academic course, left for the mission in Ireland in 1640, and suffered death for his faith ten years later. The first Jesuit rector became general of the society; he was succeeded by James Forde, who was succeeded in 1637 by William Malone, a combatant in controversy with Archbishop Usher. In 1650 Scarampo of the Oratory, on return from his embassy to the Kilkenny Confederation, brought with him two students to the Irish College; one was Peter Walsh, who became an Oratorian; the other was Oliver Plunkett, who was kept in Rome as professor at the Pontificio Collegio Urbano "De Propaganda Fide" until his appointment to the see of Armagh in 1670. John Brennan, one of Plunkett's contemporaries, also became a professor at Propaganda; whence he was appointed Bishop of Waterford, and then Archbishop of Cashel. Soon after came several remarkable students — James Cusack, Bishop of Meath; Peter Creagh, successively Bishop of Cork and Cloyne, and Archbishop of Dublin.

In the earliest part of the eighteenth century, one of the former students, Hugh MacMahon, Archbishop of Armagh, asserted the precedence of that see to Dublin in a work of great learning, "Jus Primatiale Armacanum". Richard Reynolds at the end of his course was kept in Rome at tutor to the children of the Pretender; James Gallagher became Bishop of Kildare. The college had never more than eight students at a time, and had often so few as five. In other ways, however, the college had its trials and changes. It came into financial difficulties. The villa at Castel Gandolfo was sold to the Jesuit novitiate in 1667, and yet the difficulties did not disappear. It was thought, moreover, that too large a proportion of the able students found a vocation in the Society of Jesus, in spite of the purpose of the college, which trained them for the mission in Ireland. Complaints as to administration were also made, and a Pontifical Commission was deputed to make an official inquiry. Its report was not favourable to the Jesuits, and in September, 1772, the college was withdrawn from their control.

== After the Jesuits ==
The college now passed from the care of the Jesuits, and an Italian priest, Abbate Luigi Cuccagni, was made rector. He was a man of acknowledged ability and the author of several works which were in high repute in those days. From the Irish College he edited the "Giornale Ecclesiastico di Roma", then the leading Catholic periodical in Rome. The first prefect of studies appointed under his rectorate was Pietro Tamburini, who afterwards became the leader of Jansenism at Pavia. During his prefectship he delivered his lectures on the Fathers which were afterwards published at Pavia. He had to leave the college after four years.

The rectorate of Cuccagni came to an end in 1798, when the college was closed by order of Napoleon. During those twenty-six years it quite equalled its previous prestige for although its number of students was sometimes as low as three, the College produced John Lanigan the historian, who promoted directly from being a student of the Irish college to the chair of Scripture at Pavia; Charles O'Conor, author of "Scriptores Rerum Hibernicarum" and several others works; Ryan, Bishop of Ferns; McCarthy, Coadjutor Bishop of Cork; and Michael Blake, Bishop of Dromore.

== From 1826 ==
Blake, the last student to leave the college at its dissolution in 1798, returned a quarter of a century later to arrange for its revival, which was effected by a brief of Pope Leo XII, dated 18 February 1826. He was appointed first rector of the restored college, and among the students who sought early admission was Francis Mahoney of Cork, known to the literary world as Father Prout. Blake was succeeded by Boylan of Maynooth, who soon resigned, and died in 1830.

In late 1831, Paul Cullen was appointed rector of the fledgling and struggling Irish College. He successfully secured the future of the college by increasing the student population and thereby strengthening the finances of the college. Within two years of his rectorate he had forty students in the college; and to provide proper accommodations for the increasing numbers who sought admission, a new building with the Church of Sant'Agata de' Goti was given to the college by Gregory XVI in 1835. He astutely fostered relationships with the Irish hierarchy, on whom he relied for students, often becoming their official Roman agent. This role yielded income and influence and was to remain a key function of future rectors. He endeavoured to chart a middle ground between conflicting parties of Irish bishops. He was active in his opposition to the establishment of the secular Queen's Colleges. Two years later Dr. Cullen purchased a fine country villa as a summer home, amid the olive groves which cover the slopes of the Sabine hills near Tivoli. Among the distinguished students who passed through the college during Cullen's rectorate were C. P. Meehan, Edmund O'Reilly, Bishop Croke, Cardinal Moran, and Archbishop Dunne of Brisbane. Cullen was a vigorous, detailed and committed correspondent with his successor Tobias Kirby and their correspondence forms the heart of this part of the college's archives. The Irish political leader Daniel O'Connell was received by Cullen and is remembered in the college with a memorial.

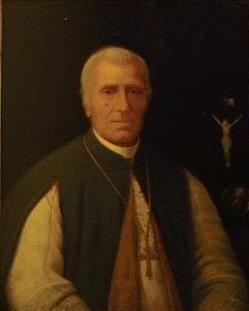
Tobias Kirby, rector of the college from 1850 to 1891

Tobias Kirby succeeded Cullen in 1849 and was rector until 1891. Kirby lived in Rome for 69 years and it is reported to have returned home only twice during that period. Kirby marshalled the college's resources both in Rome and back in Ireland, helped in part by the election of his former classmate and friend as Pope Leo XIII. Kirby was raised to the episcopate and eventually became the titular Archbishop of Ephesus.

== 20th century ==
His successor Michael Kelly served a seven-year term as rector before being appointed in 1901 as coadjutor to the Archbishop of Sydney. He was succeeded by Michael O'Riordan, a priest of the diocese of Limerick whose correspondence and good offices between the Irish bishops and the Vatican are particularly revealing for the period from the Easter Rising on. It has been argued that the Vatican drew close to Irish Nationalist opinion in these critical years due, in no small part, to the work of O'Riordan, and his vice-rector and ultimate successor, John O'Hagan

O'Hagan took stewardship of the college at a propitious time for Ireland, and this is reflected in many of the major events associated with his time as rector. A recent assessment of him drew attention to the beatification of Oliver Plunkett in May 1920 which it is suggested he "transformed into a nationalist fête." His papers have digitized and catalogued. In the winter of 1926/7 he travelled to the United States for fundraising missions in order to meet the costs of the 'new' College, the current building with tis impressive façade and grounds which had opened that same year. Later still in 1929 O'Hagan presided over the centenary celebrations in Rome for Catholic Emancipation and was influential in the decision to appointment a Nuncio in Dublin. He died in office in 1930 and is buried in Rome.

== 21st century ==
In 2003 the British prime minister Tony Blair and his family stayed in the Irish College during a trip to Italy.

In 2007, a former student, the Iraqi priest Ragheed Ganni, was murdered along with three subdeacons after he had celebrated Mass for his parish community in Mosul, Iraq.

In 2011, under orders from Pope Benedict XVI, Cardinal Timothy Dolan, Archbishop of New York, led a "root and branch review" of all structures and processes at the college. He was assisted in the visitation report by the then-Archbishop of Baltimore Edwin O’Brien, and Francis Kelly of the North American College in Rome. The report was highly critical of the college, as a result of which three Irish members of the staff were sent home and the fourth resigned. The rector accepted a position as Professor of the Practice of Sacramental Theology at the Theology Department at Boston College. In 2012, the four Irish archbishops, Cardinal Seán Brady, Archbishop of Armagh, the Archbishop of Dublin, Diarmuid Martin, the Archbishop of Tuam, Michael Neary, and the Archbishop of Cashel, Dermot Clifford, were sent a copy of the visitation report by the Vatican. A response prepared for them said "a deep prejudice appears to have coloured the visitation and from the outset and it led to the hostile tone and content of the report." It was also commented that staff had not had a chance to respond properly to criticisms.

In 2016, seminarians from St. John Vianney College Seminary moved to the Irish College for formation at Pontifical University of St Thomas Aquinas. Building on the partnership with the St. John Vianney Seminary, in 2023, Irish lay students were invited to a "study abroad" programme alongside US undergraduates from University of St. Thomas (Minnesota), residing in the Irish College.

=== Lay Formation Catholic Studies Programme ===
From 2025 a lay formation Catholic Studies programme commenced both on a semester and year-long basis, running in collaboration with a number of Catholic University departments in the United States, and aimed at students between the ages of 18 and 30, with students coming from Ireland and the US, who reside in the College accommodation. The programme also gives students the opportunity to study introductory courses in theology and philosophy at the Pontifical Gregorian University of Rome.

== Rectors of the College ==
- Paul Finnerty, Rector (2020–) (previously Vice-Rector (2017–2020))
- Ciaran O'Carroll (2011–2020)
- Liam Bergin (2001–2011)
- John Fleming (1993–2001) (Vice-Rector (1987–1993))
- Seán Brady (1987–1993) (Vice-Rector (1980–1987))
- John (Jack) Hanly (1980–1987)
- Eamonn Marron (1968–1980)
- Dominic Joseph Conway (1965–1968) (Spiritual Director (1951–1965))
- Donal Herlihy Rector (1951–1964) (Vice-Rector (1947–1951))
- Denis McDaid Rector (1939 – 1951)
- Michael J. Curran (1930–1939) (Vice-Rector (1920–1930))
- John O'Hagan (1919–1930) (Vice-Rector (1904–1919))
- Michael O'Riordan (1905–1919)
- Michael Kelly (1894–1901)
- Tobias Kirby (1850–1891)
- Paul Cullen (1831–1850)
- Christopher Boylan (1828–1830)
- Michael Blake (1826–1828), student from 1798, returned to re-establish the college

Before Suppression in 1798

- Luigi Cuccagni (1772–1798), Italian priest; first non-Jesuit since 1635

Jesuit Rectors

- Ignazio Maria Petrelli (6 December 1769 – 18 September 1772), last Jesuit rector
- Edward Creagh (1 December (1768 – 5 December 1769)
- Andrew Ryan (11 June 1766 – 30 November 1768)
- Stanislaus Nowlan (16 September 1759 – 10 June 1766)
- Thomas Brennan (14 June 1754 – 15 September 1759)
- Stephen Ussher (16 October 1751 – 14 June 1754)
- Francesco Martini (31 October 1750 – 15 October 1751)
- Michael Fitzgerald (12 February 1746 – 30 October 1750)
- Alexander Roche (Alessandro della Rocca) (17 January 1715 – 9 December 1744)
- Alessandro Sestio (19 January 1711 – 17 December 1714)
- Michele Imperiali (24 January 1708 – 18 January 1711)
- Carlo Lucchesini (27 January 1704 – 23 January 1708)
- Gianbattista Naselli (21 August 1698 – 26 January 1704)
- Thomas Eustace (10 October 1694 – 20 August 1698)
- Agostino Maria de Auria (18 April 1691 – 9 October 1694)
- Gregorio Fanti (16 December 1687 – 17 April 1691)
- Gabriele Maria Grassi (1 January 1683 – 16 December 1687)
- Girolamo Gandolfi (29 May 1675 – 8 November 1682)
- Sebastiano Beilucio (17 January 1672 – 29 May 1675)
- Michael Jordan (August 1670 – 17 January 1672)
- Francesco Echinardi (acted as vice-rector), (September 1669 – July 1670)
- Edward Locke (2 October 1667 – August 1669)
- Philip Roche (dela rocha or Rocheus) (14 July 1664 – 11 Jun 1667), died in office.
- John Young (24 February 1656 - 13 July 1664) - died in office
- Petronio Ferri (24 February 1653 – 24 February 1656)
- Gianbattista Bargiocchi 24 February 1650 24 February 1653)
- Giovanni Rusco (2 February 1647 – 24 February 1650)
- Fabio Albergati (1 February 1642 – 2 February 1647)
- William Malone (10 December 1637 – 31 January 1642), became Superior of Irish Jesuits and Rector of Irish College Seville.
- Agostino Garzadoro (end of February 1637 – 10 December 1637)
- James (Jacob) Ford(e) (2 December 1635 – end of February 1637)
- Alessandro Gottifredi (8 February 1635 – 2 December 1635), first Jesuit Rector

Early Rectors

- John Punch (8 July 1630 – 8 February 1635), Franciscan Theologian
- Martin Walsh (July 1629-12 March 1630), Franciscan
- Eugene Callan (January 1626 - July 1629), first rector

== The College today ==
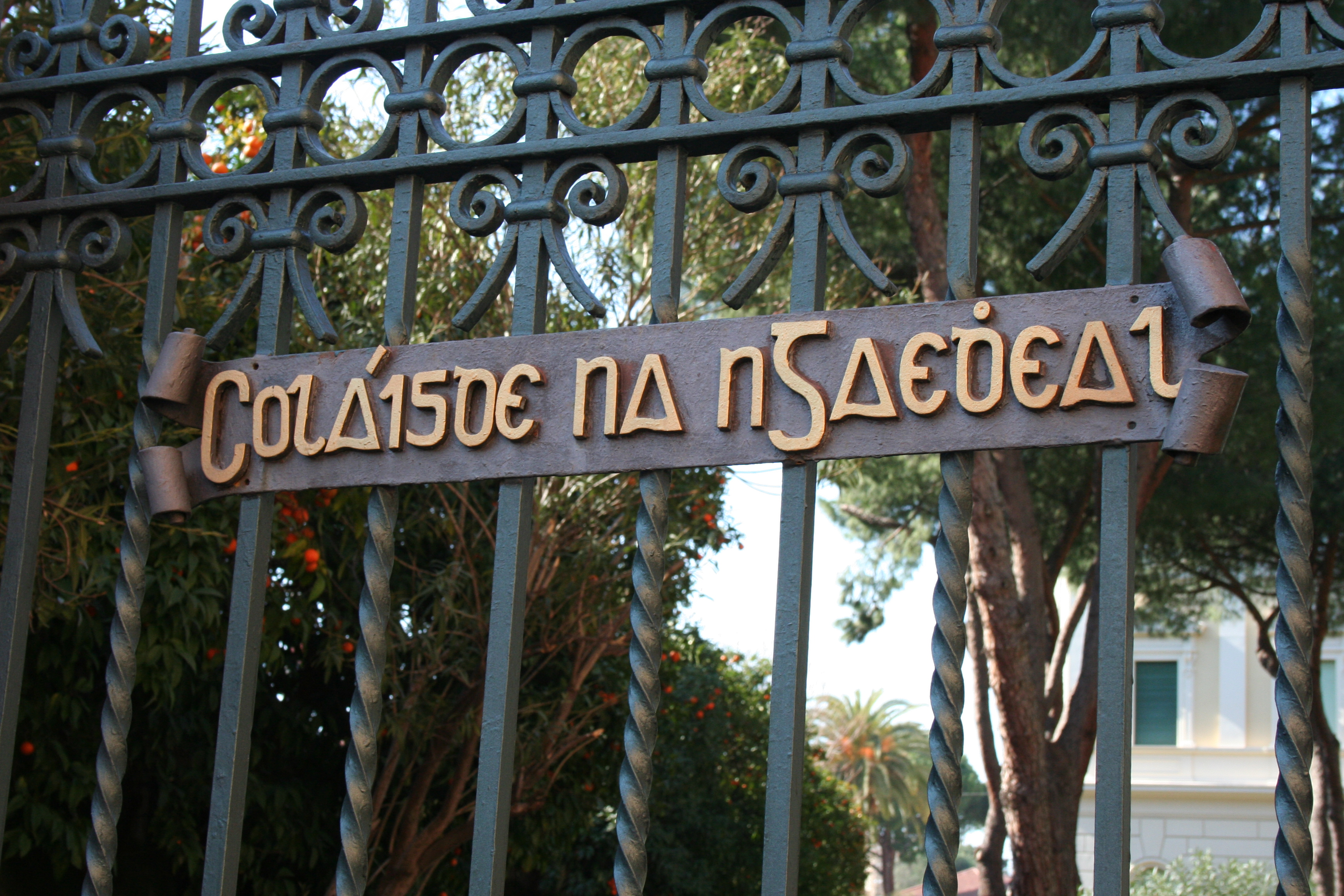
Gates of Irish College

The college was the last remaining Irish seminary and training college in continental Europe with extensive archives that are increasingly seen as important for researchers in understanding the history of the Church in Ireland.

The college is located in Via dei Santi Quattro, #1 and serves as a residence for clerical students from all over the world. Every year over 250 Irish couples choose the college chapel as a means to marry in Rome. It organises events for the Irish and wider international community who are currently residing in Rome and has over the years become an unofficial centre for Irish visitors to Rome seeking advice and information.

Important contemporary visitors to the college include Pope John Paul II and British Prime Minister Tony Blair. Irish President Mary McAleese. addressed the college on 6 November 2003, the 375th anniversary of the founding of the college.

Given the reduction in the number of Irish candidates training for the priesthood, the financial pressure on Irish seminaries is once again an issue. This has required cutbacks such that the college can no longer afford to employ a librarian despite the collection of texts in the college library. An investment from the sale of the Irish College in Salamanca, Spain, which closed in 1952, was ultimately lost in the financial crises and continued funding from benefactors has been limited. The facilitating of students from the US now provides an important income for the college as does the offering of accommodation to visiting clergy and pilgrims especially during the summer months.

The college's students formerly produced an annual year book, The Coelian though this tradition ended some time ago. The existing volumes represent an important social memory for the institution which include photographs and essays. Volumes created during the Second World War and the Second Vatican Council are especially interesting.

In 2016, students from St. John Vianney Seminary in St. Paul, Minnesota spent a semester abroad at the Irish College when the Pontifical North American College could not house them. In 2018, the 100th anniversary of the foundation of the Missionary Society of St. Columban was celebrated at the Irish College.

=== Administration and governance ===
The rector (previously acting rector) of the Irish College, as of 2022, is Paul Finnerty, of the Diocese of Limerick, who was vice-rector from 2017, while Aidan Ryan is Spiritual Director since 2019 and John Coughlan Director of Formation since 2016. The college is managed by a board of trustees, chaired as of 2020 by Archbishop Diarmuid Martin of Dublin. At the June 2020 meeting of the Irish Bishops' Conference “the Trustees of the Pontifical Irish College, Rome, reported to the Bishop's Conference that the College does not intend to receive Irish seminarians for the academic year 2020-2021”. The bishops added that the decision will remain under review. No statement was made about the other contingent of seminarians, from North America, the hosting of other clerical students, including from Orthodox churches, or the post-graduate aspect of the college's work.

=== Villa Irlanda ===
The college complex includes a bed-and-breakfast accommodation facility, a Casa per Ferie, Villa Irlanda, for pilgrims to Rome. The chapel is available as are rooms to book for conventions and other meetings.

== Study ==
A history of the college was edited by Irish professor of history Daire Keogh and a past vice-rector of the college, Albert McDonnell; entitled "The Irish College, Rome and its world", it was published by Four Courts Press in Dublin in 2008.

== See also ==
- Maynooth College
- Irish College in Paris
- List of Jesuit sites
