= Denis McDaid =

Irish Catholic clergyman who served as Rector of the Pontifical Irish College

Monsignor Dr Denis McDaid (1899–1981) was an Irish Roman Catholic clergyman who served as Rector of the Pontifical Irish College from 1939 – 1951 and thereafter was a Canon of St. Peter's Basilica. He is buried in Campo Verano in Rome.

Monsignor Dr Denis McDaid was educated in St Columb's College and studied for the priesthood in Rome and was ordained a priest for service in the Diocese of Derry in 1922. He undertook doctoral studies in Rome and then spent four years in the Archdiocese of Glasgow before an 8 years stint as a curate in Leckpatrick and a further curacy in Kilrea in 1936/

He was appointed Seminary Rector in early 1939.

The historian Dermot Keogh wrote in his 1925 book Ireland and the Vatican that McDaid was "reserved, formal and not a little pedantic" and that it was a pity other stronger candidates were not offered the post.

McDaid's nationalist sentiments caused some unease to Irish diplomats who wished that in the context of the German occupation of Rome during the Second World War, McDaid would speak less in public and "attend to his own business." McDaid later wrote an account of the College during the war years which was published in the College magazine The Coelian in 1968.
