= Taghadoe =

Monastery in County Kildare, Ireland

- Tigh Tua
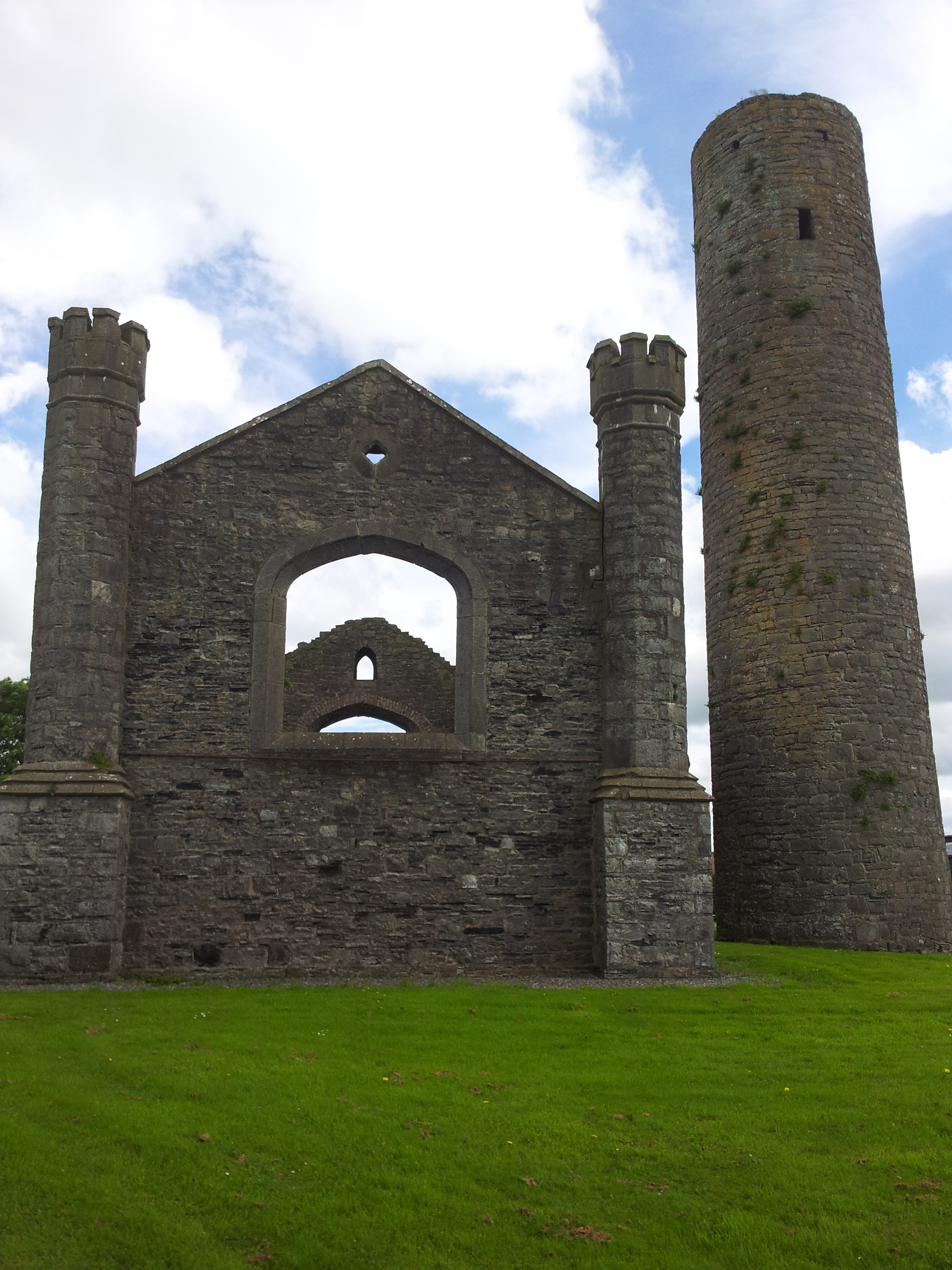
- Taghadoe church and round tower

- Location within Ireland
- Interactive map of Taghadoe

Monastery information
- Other names: Teghto, Tagheto, Taughtoo
- Established: 6th century
- Disestablished: 17th century
- Mother house: Clonmacnoise
- Dedication: Tua (Ultan the Silent)
- Diocese: Dublin

Architecture
- Functional status: Abandoned
- Heritage designation: National Monument
- Style: Celtic monastic

Site
- Location: County Kildare, Ireland (3 km SSW of Maynooth)
- Coordinates: 53.3533°N 6.6131°W
- Public access: yes

Taghadoe in County Kildare in Ireland is the site of an ancient monastic settlement and round tower. The site includes a graveyard and the ruins of a 19th-century church. It is situated 5 km from Maynooth, off the Straffan Road. The name is derived from Teach Tua or 'House of Tua' in Irish, Saint Tua (Ultan the Silent) the abbot of Clonmacnoise, was responsible for founding the monastic settlement here. The site dates back to the 6th century. The round tower was used for about 1000 years, but was left in ruins by the 17th century. Most of the burials in the graveyard were in the 17th and 18th century and it was used by Roman Catholics. A John Dillon of Carton had bequeathed £1,000 for the building of a church on the site; the Duke of Leinster was the executor of his will.

The church which was constructed on the site in 1831 for the Church of Ireland by a donation from the Board of First Fruits of £830. This church was only active for 40 years and, while derelict, its walls are quite intact.

The tower was declared a national monument in 1886, and the site is in the care of the Office of Public Works (OPW).
