= Michael J. Curran =

Michael J. Curran (1880-1960) was an Irish priest who served as Rector of the Pontifical Irish College, Rome.

== Early life ==
Michael Joseph Curran was born on May 8th 1860 at North Circular Road, Dublin City, County Dublin, Ireland. His parents were Patrick Joseph Curran (1851-1924) and Mary Elizabeth Curran (formerly McGahan) (1848-1935). His brother was Constantine Peter Curran the Lawyer, socialite and writer, and friend of Tom Kettle and James Joyce (who names him in Ulysses).

== Education and early ministry ==
Curran studied for the priesthood at Clonliffe College, Dublin before going to the Irish College in Rome. In December 1906 he became secretary to Archbishop William Walsh of Dublin and served in this role for thirteen years including such pivotal moments as the 1913 Dublin lock-out and the Easter Rising. In December 1919 he took up his post in Rome. During his time in Clonliffe he would have correspondence and dealings with many significant figures at the time, including helping hide Éamon de Valera on the college grounds in 1919.

== Rector in Rome ==
In 1919 Curran was appointed Vice Rector and succeeded as Rector in 1930 serving until 1939. Papers from Monsignor Curran are held in the archive of the Irish College Rome, some in Clonliffe College from his time as Diocesan Secretary and some in the Military Archives in Cathal Brugha Barracks in Dublin from his statements on the Rising and War of Independence.

== Return to Dublin ==
Curran became Parish Priest of Aughrim St in 1939 and served there until his death on 9 February 1960. Monsignor Michael Curran was elected President of the Oliver Plunkett Union in 1955.
