= Michael Curran (politician) =

American politician (born 1939)

Member of the South Dakota House of Representatives
- In office 1973–1978

Personal details
- Born: June 13, 1939 (age 87)
- Party: Democratic
- Education: South Dakota State University

Michael Curran (born June 13, 1939) is an American politician. He served as a Democratic member of the South Dakota House of Representatives.

== Life and career ==
Curran attended Heelan High School and South Dakota State University.

Curran served in the South Dakota House of Representatives from 1973 to 1978.
