= Graigue, Dorrha =

Townland in County Tipperary, Ireland

Graigue (An Ghráig in Irish) a townland in the civil parish of Dorrha in the Barony of Ormond Lower, County Tipperary, Ireland. It is located in the extreme north of the county, east of Rathcabbin and is one of 12 townlands in County Tipperary known as Graigue in English.

The Church of Ireland church building (1832) was financed by the Board of First Fruits. It and its graveyard are located within the enclosure of an early Christian monastic settlement.

The Dáil constituency of Offaly includes Graigue along with twenty four other electoral divisions within County Tipperary.
