= St Mary's Church, Haddington Road, Dublin =

St Mary's Church
- St Mary's Church, Haddington Road
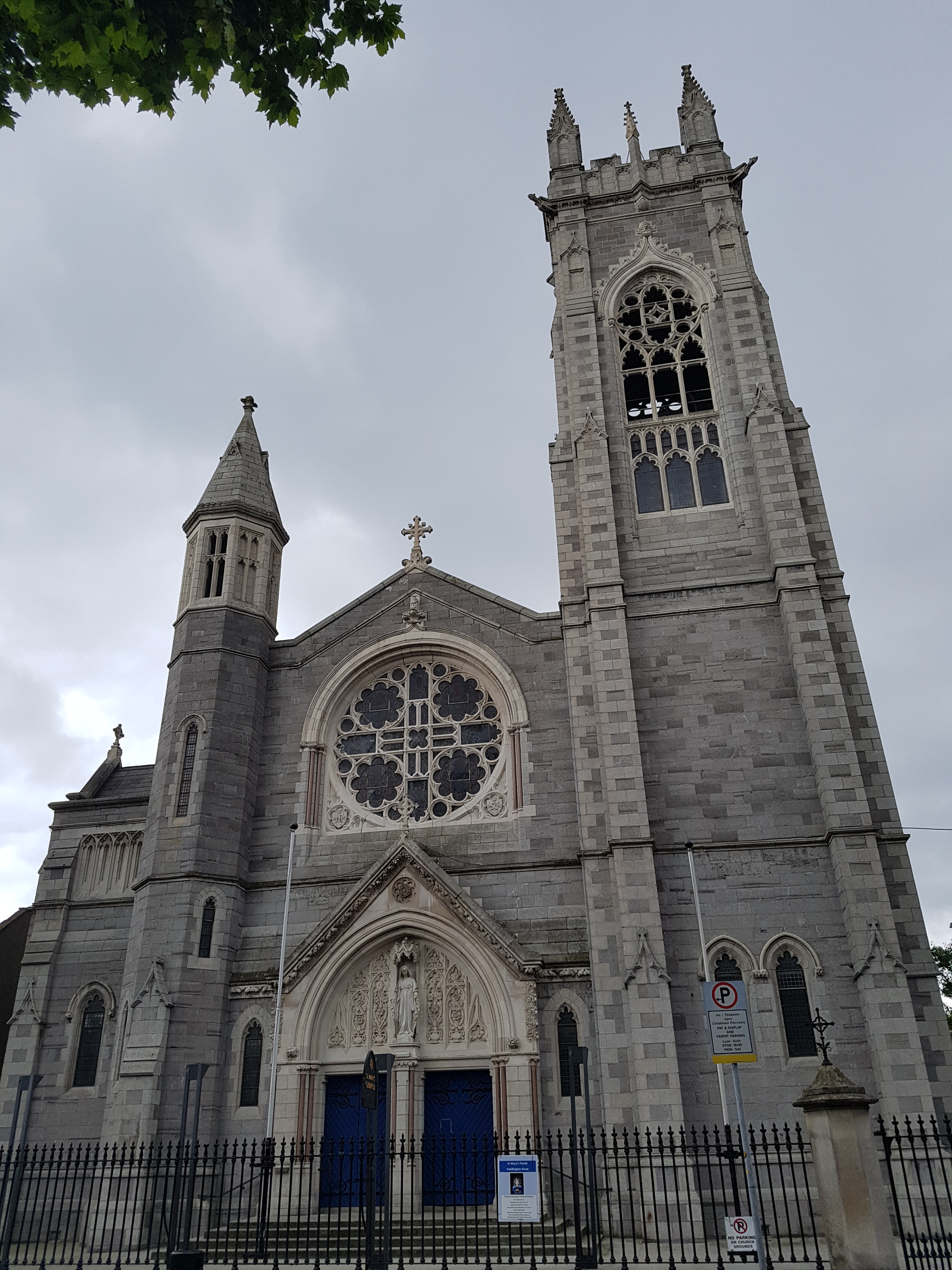
- St Mary's Church
- 53.33470°N 6.24140°W
- Location: Dublin
- Country: Ireland
- Denomination: Roman Catholic
- Website: stmaryshaddingtonroad.ie

History
- Dedication: St Mary
- Consecrated: 1839

Architecture
- Groundbreaking: 1835

Administration
- Archdiocese: Dublin
- Deanery: South City Centre
- Parish: St Mary's

St Mary's Church, Haddington Road, is a Catholic church on Haddington Road in Dublin, Ireland.

== History ==
The area was a newly developing suburb in the early 19th century. The Grand Canal was long established and Beggars Bush Barracks was built in 1827. Catholic emancipation was also a factor in the building of the church. The original architect is unknown, but the church is in the style of Gothic Revival.

Ground for the church was broken in 1835 and the church was blessed in 1839 by Archbishop Daniel Murray. At the time it had an earthen floor, no ceiling and no internal plastering. Internal plastering was completed in 1842, a passage was added on the east side of the church in 1844 and wooden flooring replaced the earthen one in 1848.

A new chancel with apse was erected to the design of architect Charles Geoghegan from 1877-78. The refurbished church was opened by bishop auxiliary Edward MacCabe on 9 November 1879.

In 1898 the frontage was erected - the architect was John Joseph O'Callaghan and the builder was James Kiernan. The bell tower was erected shortly afterwards to a design by Walter Doolin and is known as the Lee Memorial Tower after the parish priest the Very Reverend James Canon Lee.
