= Sydney Parade Avenue =

Street in Dublin, Ireland

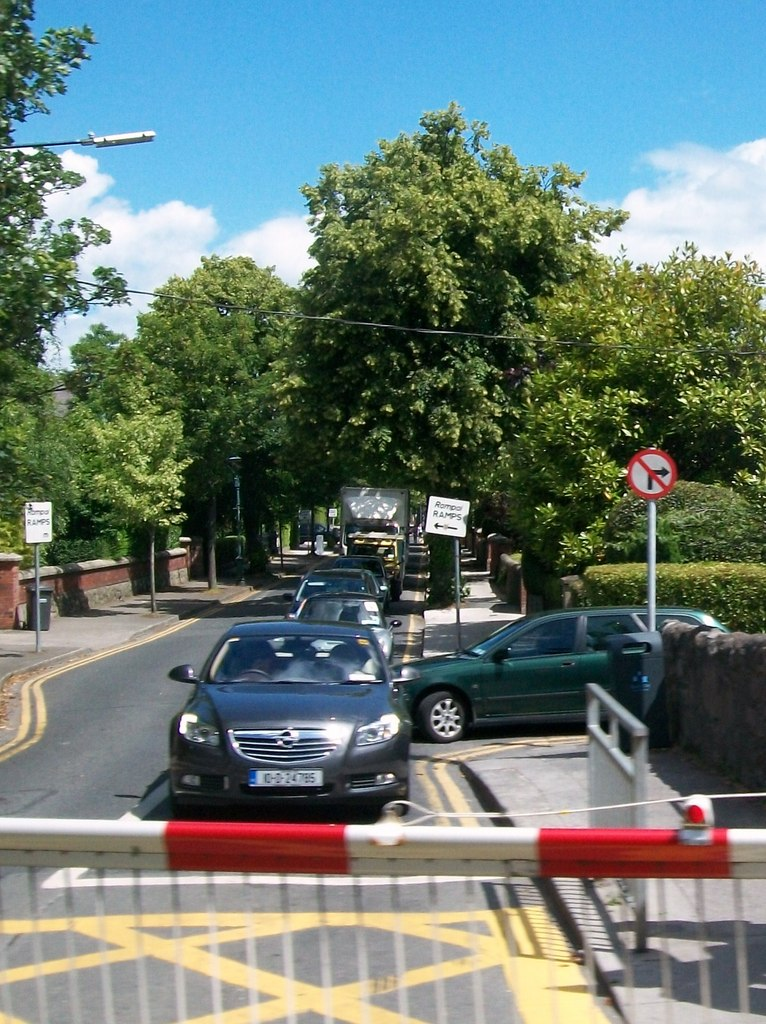
- Traffic at the level crossing on Sydney Parade Avenue

- Location within Dublin
- Native name: Ascaill Pharáid Sydney (Irish); Ascaill Pharáid Shidní (Irish)
- Namesake: Sidney Herbert, 1st Baron Herbert of Lea
- Length: 700 m (2,300 ft)
- Width: 10 metres (33 ft)
- Location: Sandymount, Dublin, Ireland
- Postal code: D04
- Coordinates: 53°19′22″N 6°12′33″W
- northeast end: Strand Road
- southwest end: Merrion Road

Other
- Known for: Sydney Parade railway station

Sydney Parade Avenue (Irish: Ascaill Pharáid Sydney) Sandymount, Dublin 4, Ireland runs from the land formerly known as Ailesbury Park opposite the Merrion Centre at the Merrion Road end, to the sea of Dublin Bay at the Strand Road. Ailesbury Road joins Sydney Parade at the DART station known as Sydney Parade railway station, originally opened in January 1835. Other side roads off the avenue include

- Richelieu Park, a cul-de-sac
- Ailesbury Park,
- Ailesbury Gardens, which joins with
- St. Alban's Park, and
- Park Avenue, the road to Sandymount village.

The Ailesbury Park end of the avenue has been closed to road traffic since the 1980s.

== Literary connection ==
In "A Painful Case" by James Joyce, Mr. and Mrs. Sinico lived in a house called Leoville on Sydney Parade Avenue.

== See also ==
- List of streets and squares in Dublin
