= St. Matthew's Church, Ringsend =

Protestant church in Dublin, Ireland

St. Matthew's Church
- Interactive map of the St. Matthew's Church area
- Former names: Royal Chapel of St Matthew

General information
- Status: Church
- Location: Ringsend, Ireland
- Coordinates: 53°20′18″N 6°13′20″W
- Groundbreaking: 1704
- Topped-out: 1713 (tower)
- Estimated completion: 1706
- Renovated: 1878-79

Technical details
- Material: calp limestone, granite dressings

Design and construction
- Developer: William King

Website
- stmattschurch.ie/history/

St. Matthew's Church is a Church of Ireland church in Ringsend and Irishtown in Dublin.

== History ==
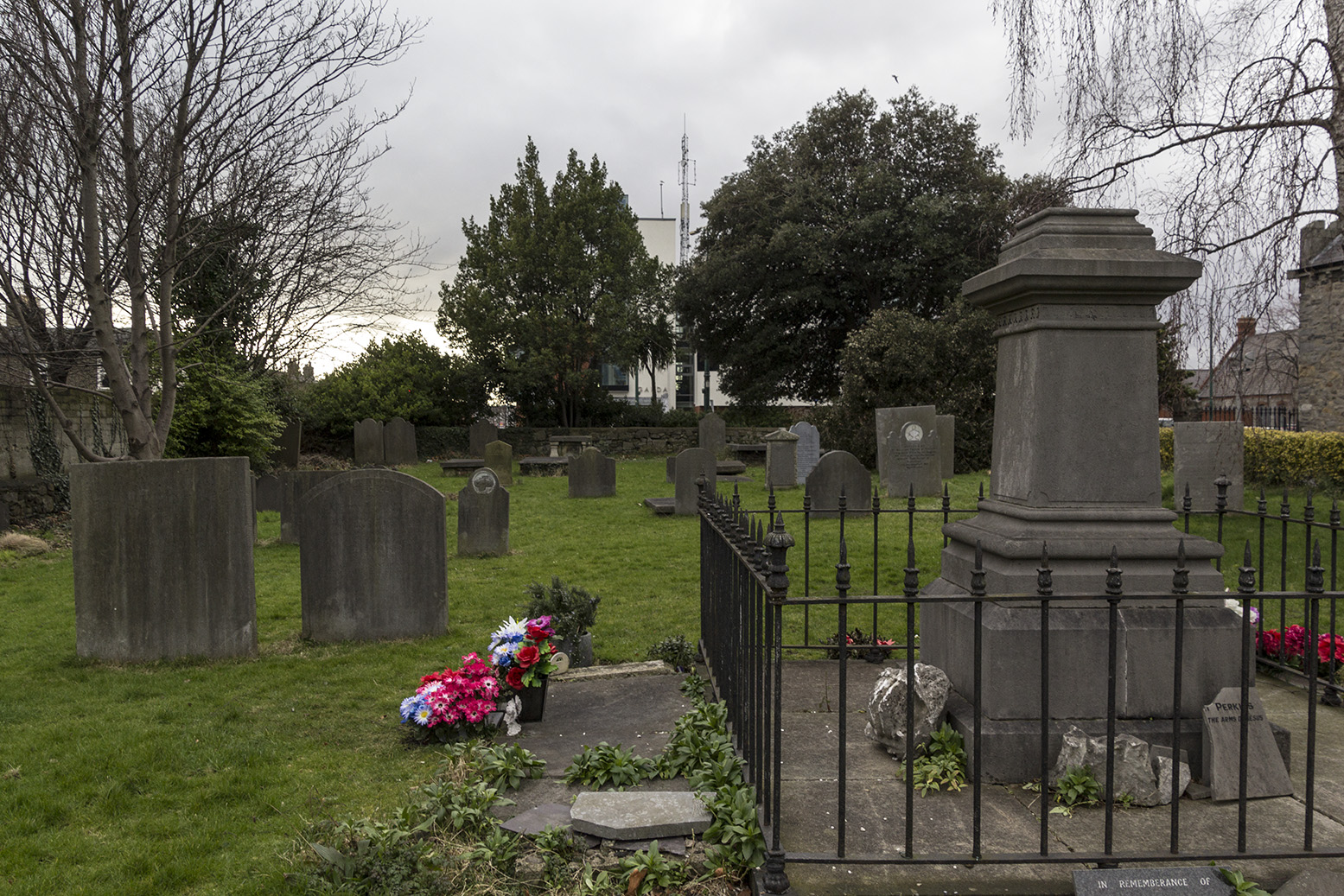
Graveyard adjoining the church

The church was originally built in calp limestone with granite dressings between 1704 and 1706. The tower was added after the initial main church building, around 1713. A notable feature is the broken pediment over the church door.

The church was later remodelled by James Franklin Fuller in 1879. A marble floor was installed in 1890 to a design by Thomas Drew. A pyramidal steeple was also added to the church in 1713, but this was removed following a storm in 1839.

It was called the Royal Chapel of St Matthew, Ringsend from its foundation until 1871 because the Church of Ireland Archbishop of Dublin, Dr. William King (1650–1729), wanted the government to pay for the church, which was built under an act of Queen Anne and later designated by George I.

Rev. John Bohereau (or Borough/Burrough) was appointed as the first minister in 1723, where previously it had been served by priests from Donnybrook. Rev. R.H. Wall served as chaplain to the church. Rev. William J. Stoney was appointed the first rector following the disestablishment of the Church of Ireland in 1871. More recent rectors have been Rev. John Marchant and Rev. Leonard Ruddock.

Following the closure of St. Mary's Church, Donnybrook, the parish was merged with Donnybrook in 2020 to form the Irishtown and Donnybrook Union of Parishes.
