= John O'Hagan (priest) =

Irish priest (1873–1930)

John O'Hagan (often referred to as John Hagan; 31 May 1873 – 8 March 1930) was an Irish priest who served as Rector of the Pontifical Irish College in Rome from 1919 to 1930, having previously been Vice Rector from 1904 to 1919.

== Life ==
John O'Hagan was born on 31 May 1873, Ballykillageer, Avoca, County Wicklow. He was educated at Ballycooge National School, the Patrician Brothers school in Tullow, then Holy Cross College (Dublin),(Clonliffe College) and the Irish College in Rome from 1895 to 1899.

He returned to Rome in 1904, to work in the Irish College, and gained his doctorate in 1908.

O'Hagan was raised to the role of Monsignor in 1921.

An Irish Nationalist, he hosted a meeting in the Irish College between Sinn Féin and the Irish Catholic Church Hierarchy.

O'Hagan died on 8 March 1930, and is buried in the Irish College tomb at Campo Verano, S.Lorenzo, Rome.
