= R815 road (Ireland) =

Road in Ireland

R815 road
- Bóthar R815
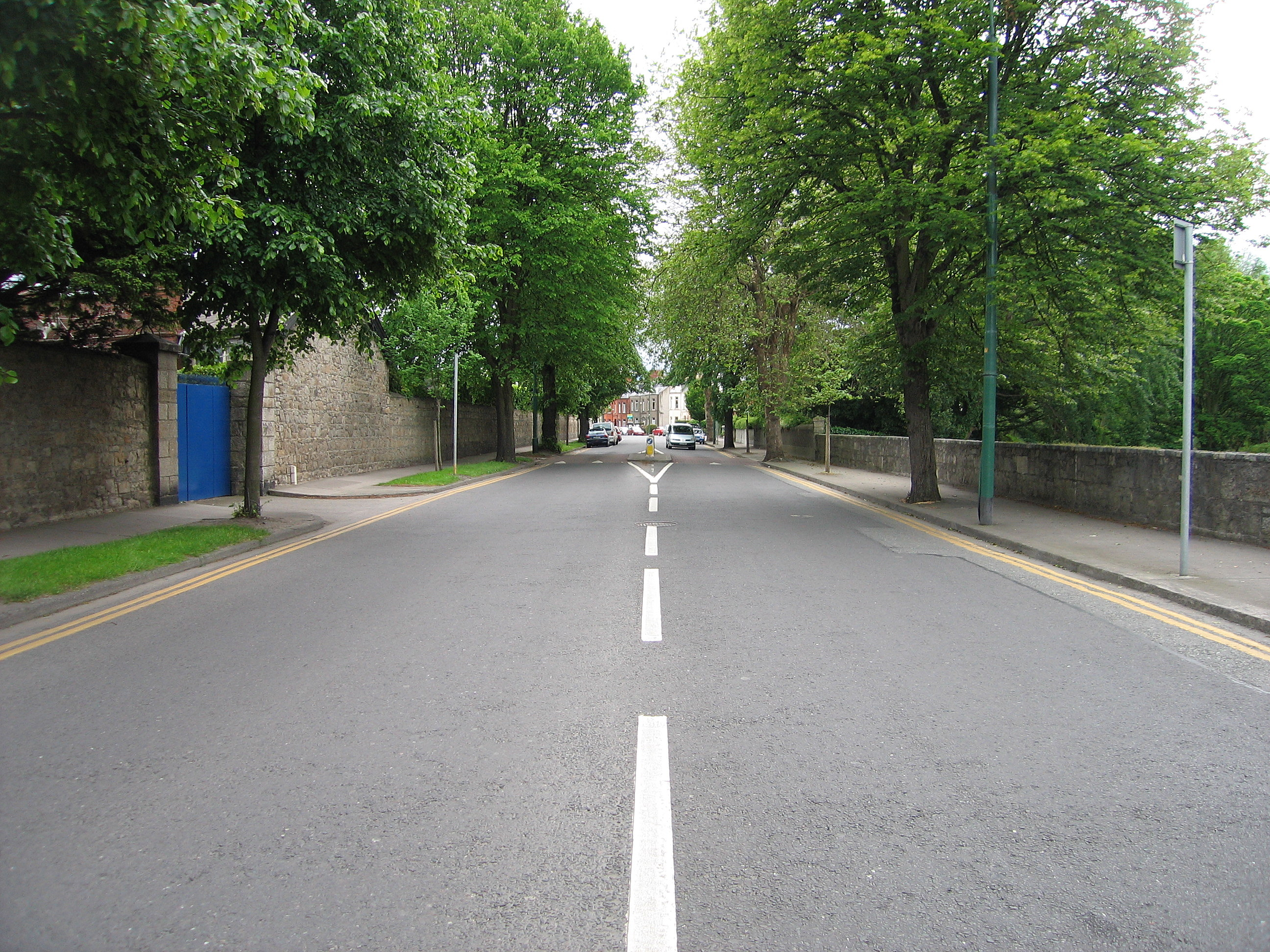
- Anglesea Road, Ballsbridge, on the R815

Location
- Country: Ireland
- Primary destinations: Dublin

Highway system
- Roads in Ireland; Motorways; Primary; Secondary; Regional

The R815 road is a regional road in Dublin, Ireland.

The official definition of the R815 from the Roads Act 1993 (Classification of Regional Roads) Order 2012 states:

R815: Westland Row - Donnybrook, Dublin

Between its junction with R118 at Westland Row and its junction with R118 at Pembroke Road via Fenian Street (and via Merrion Street Lower), Hogan Place, Grand Canal Street Lower, Grand Canal Street Upper, and Shelbourne Road all in the city of Dublin

and

between its junction with R118 at Merrion Road and its junction with R138 at Stillorgan Road via Anglesea Road all in the city of Dublin.

== See also ==
- Roads in Ireland
- Regional road
