= Beaver Henry Blacker =

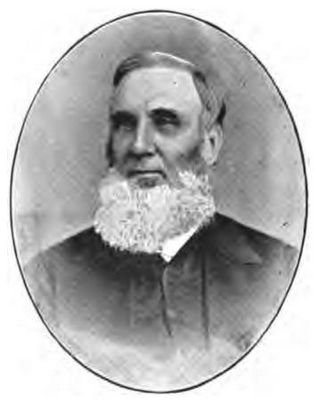
- The Rev. Beaver Henry Blacker by Cox of Clifton
- Born: May 31, 1821; Dublin, Ireland
- Died: November 11, 1890 (aged 69); Clifton, Bristol, England
- Resting place: Deans Grange Cemetery, Dublin, Ireland
- Education: Trinity College, Dublin (B.A., M.A.)
- Occupations: Anglican priest, historian, editor
- Spouse(s): Isabella Rutherford (m. 1850); Sophia Eliza O'Reilly (m. 1855)
- Children: Yes
- Relatives: George Miller (grandfather)

Beaver Henry Blacker (31 May 1821 – 11 November 1890) was an Irish Anglican priest and historian. Blacker was resident for many years in England where he was the first editor of Gloucestershire Notes and Queries. He also contributed more than 60 articles to the Dictionary of National Biography.

== Early life ==
Beaver Henry Blacker was born in Dublin on 31 May 1821, the eldest son of Latham Blacker, and a grandson of the historian and priest George Miller (1764–1848), author of the 1832 work History, philosophically illustrated. Blacker was educated at Trinity College, Dublin, where he was the three-time recipient of the vice-chancellor's prize for English prose, and from where he received his B.A. degree in 1843, and his M.A. in 1846.

== Family ==
Blacker married Isabella Rutherford in Ireland in 1850. In 1855 he married Sophia Eliza O'Reilly in Monkstown, Dublin. There were children from both marriages.

== Career ==
Blacker was curate-in-charge of Donnybrook, in County of Dublin, from 1845 to 1856. In 1857 he was appointed to the vicarage of Booterstown, in Dublin; where he oversaw several improvements to St. Philip and St. James Church in Booterstown, and to the rural deanery of South Dublin in 1862. He resigned both positions in 1874 upon his retirement to England.

Between 1847 and 1854 he published several theological pamphlets, but his first topographical work was his Brief sketches of Booterstown and Donnybrook, in the County of Dublin, with notes and annals, issued in four parts between 1860 and 1874. A separate 186 page Annals of the parishes was appended to the descriptions of the four churches of Booterstown and Donnybrook.

In England, Blacker was curate-in-charge of Charlton Kings, in Gloucestershire, in 1875–76, and senior curate of Cheltenham, in 1876–78. He lived for three years in Stroud and moved to Clifton in 1881.

== Gloucestershire Notes and Queries ==
It was in Clifton that Blacker began researching and editing Gloucestershire Notes and Queries, and collecting materials for a bibliography of Gloucestershire, as well as copying monumental inscriptions in local churches and contributing to the Dictionary of National Biography, for which he wrote more than 60 articles which he signed as B.H.B. His Gloucestershire Notes and Queries originally appeared in the columns of the Stroud Journal and its popularity there led to its publication in 48 parts from April 1879 to October 1890.

In the preface issued with the 48th part which completed the fourth volume, Blacker, writing as the editor, asked for further support to enable him to continue the work, describing it as not a "profitable speculation", but a "labour of love" in archaeology. The preface was written at the beginning of October 1890, and Blacker's health began to fail shortly after, leading to his death at Clifton on 11 November 1890. He was interred in Deans Grange Cemetery in Dublin on 19 November.

In a review of the fourth volume of Gloucestershire Notes and Queries, the historian John MacLean wrote that it "still maintains its position as the best of this class of publications, now, we are glad to say, so growing in popularity, that there are few counties without its representative. The bulky volume now before us extends to nearly 700 pages." The four volumes contain 1965 articles. Blacker's articles in Notes and Queries, to which he contributed from 1853 to 1890, are signed "Abhba."

== Selected publications ==
- Two sermons on the duty of national humiliation. 1847.
- Brief sketches of Booterstown and Donnybrook, in the County of Dublin, with notes and annals. Dublin, 1860–1874. (4 parts with a separate 186 page Annals of the parishes appended.)
- Monumental inscriptions in the parish church of Charlton Kings, Gloucestershire, with extracts from the parish registers, and some churchyard inscriptions. Privately published, London, 1876.
- Monumental inscriptions in the parish church of Cheltenham, Gloucestershire. Privately published, London, 1877.
