= Anglesea Road =

Road in Dublin, Ireland

- Anglesey Road
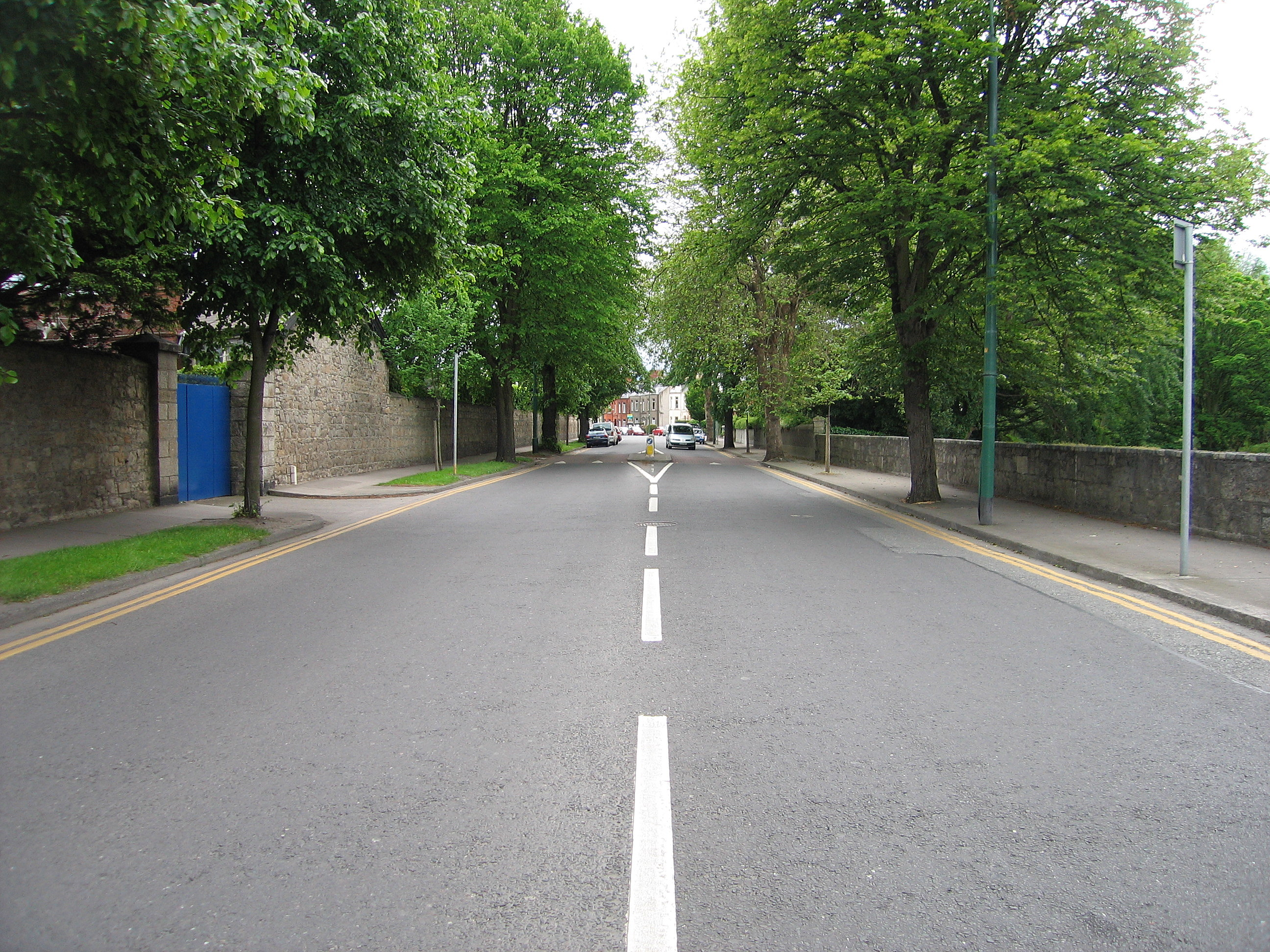
- Anglesea Road in Ballsbridge

- Location within Dublin
- Native name: Bóthar Anglesea (Irish)
- Part of: R815
- Namesake: Henry Paget, 1st Marquess of Anglesey
- Length: 1.1 km (0.68 mi)
- Width: 25 metres (82 ft)
- Postal code: D04
- Coordinates: 53°19′28″N 6°13′50″W
- south end: Anglesea Bridge and Beaver Row
- north end: Merrion Road

Other
- Known for: Royal Dublin Society; St. Mary's Church, Donnybrook

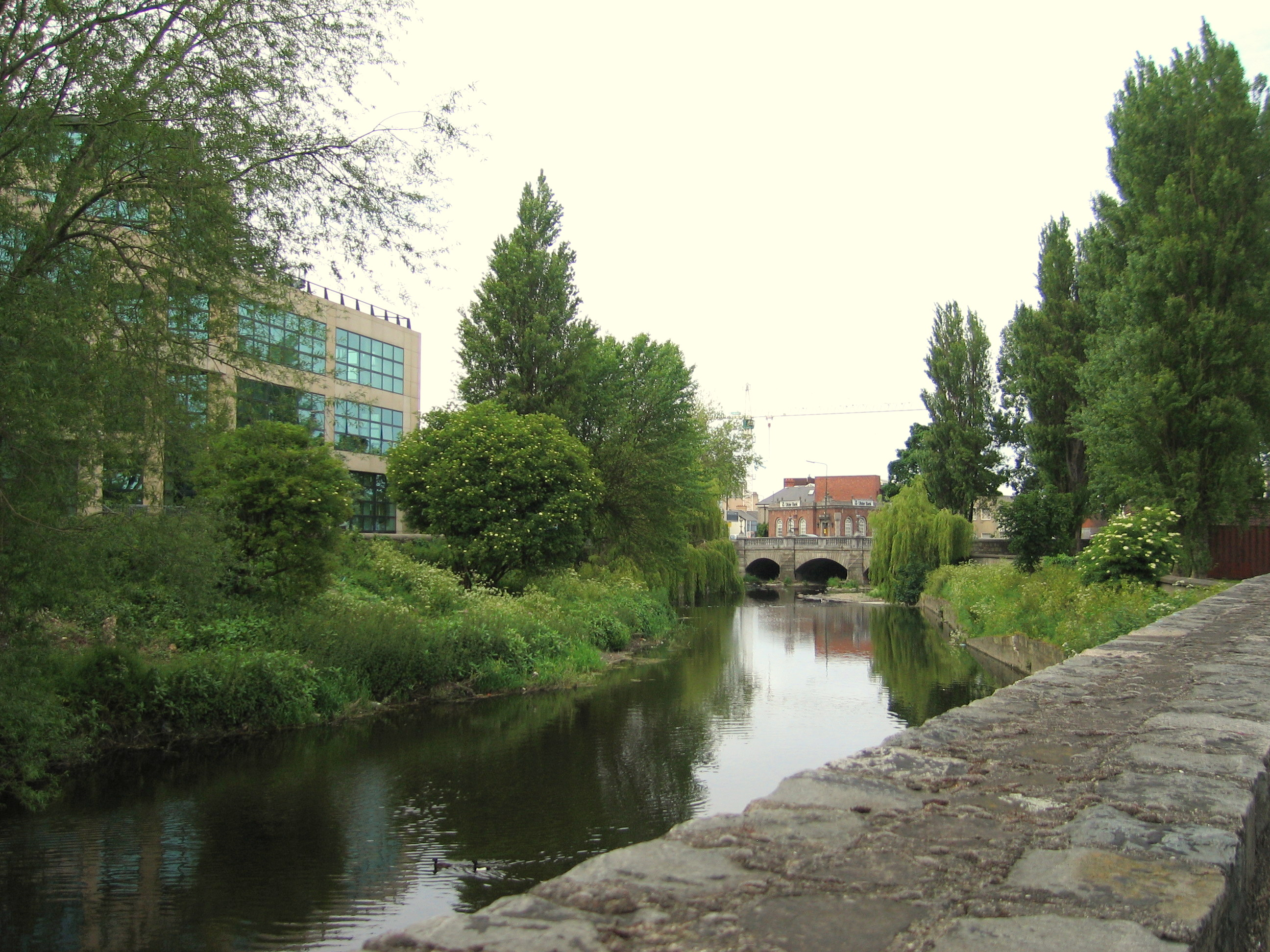
The River Dodder flows by Anglesea Road

Anglesea Road (Irish: Bóthar Anglesea) is a road joining Donnybrook with Ballsbridge, in Dublin, Ireland. It forms part of the R815 regional route in Southeast Dublin. The River Dodder flows near Anglesea Road and on a similar route to the road.

The street is not to be confused with Anglesea Row which is located in Dublin 1, parallel to Capel Street or Anglesea Street, Dublin which is located in Temple Bar, Dublin.

== History ==
A route along the river dodder from Donnybrook to Ballsbridge likely existed from long before the road's formal laying out. The remains of Simmonscourt Castle, is still located off the road and can be seen in illustrations from the 1760s.

The road is named for Henry Paget, 1st Marquess of Anglesey, who was Lord Lieutenant of Ireland in 1828 and 1830, around the time of the road's laying out. The name is still noted as 'Anglesey Road' on earlier maps.

The road originally joined with Beaver Row across the Donnybrook Road. Beaver Row was named for Beaver Henry Blacker who was curate in charge of Donnybrook from 1845 to 1856.

One of the first major buildings on the road was St. Mary's Church, Donnybrook which was consecrated in April 1830.

Most houses on the road are Victorian and Edwardian in style and are listed on the record of protected structures maintained by Dublin City Council.

A number of sports clubs and sports venues are located in and around the Anglesea Road area. These include Old Belvedere R.F.C., Merrion Cricket Club, Anglesea Road Cricket Ground and the RDS Arena.

== See also ==
- List of streets and squares in Dublin
