= Firhouse =

Suburb of Dublin, Ireland

Firhouse Teach na Giúise (Irish)
- Suburb
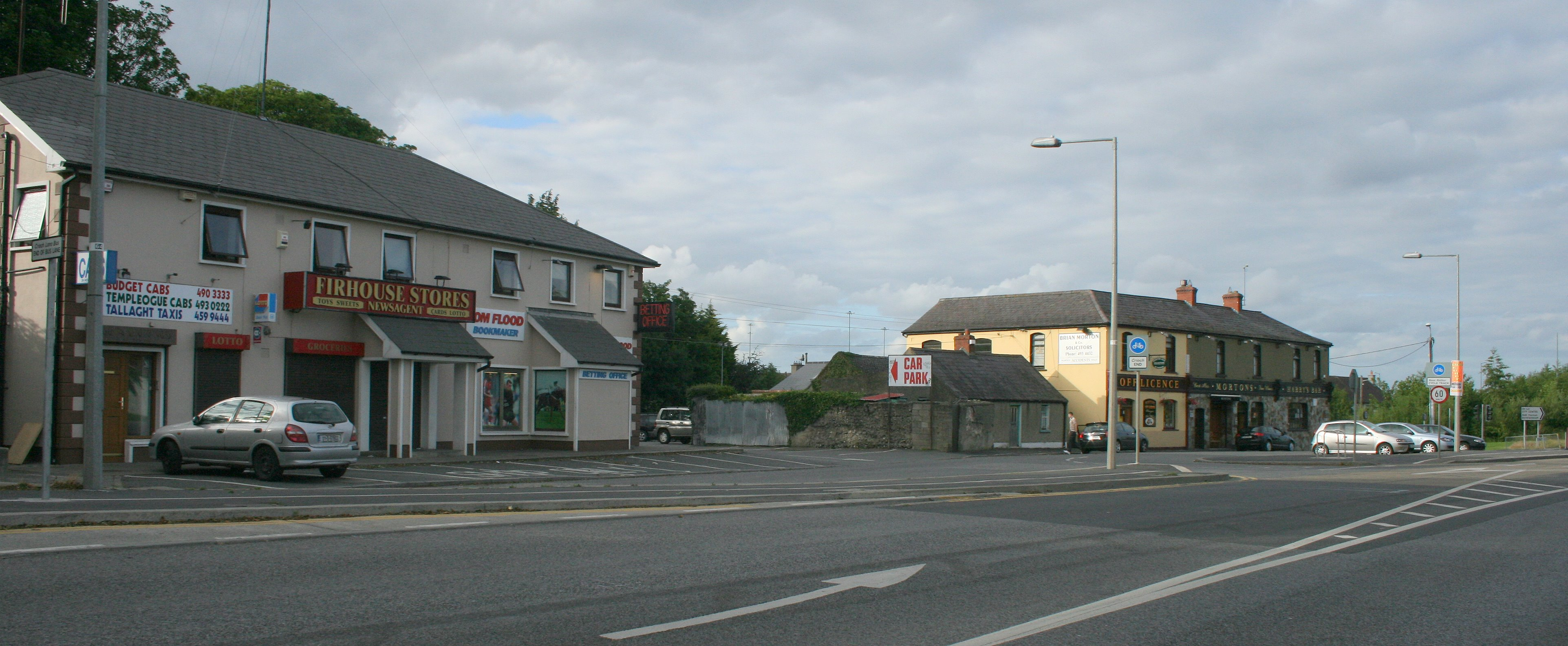
- The old village area of Firhouse

- Location in Dublin Firhouse (Dublin)
- Coordinates: 53°17′N 6°20′W
- Country: Ireland
- Province: Leinster
- Region: Eastern and Midland Region
- County: County Dublin
- Local government area: South Dublin
- Time zone: UTC+0 (WET)
  - Summer (DST): UTC+1 (IST (WEST))
- Eircode routing key: D24

Firhouse Village (electoral division)
Year	Pop.	±%
2006	10,751	—
2011	11,648	+8.3%
2016	12,214	+4.9%
2022	12,254	+0.3%

Firhouse (Irish: Teach na Giúise) is an outer suburb of Dublin, in the south of County Dublin, Ireland. It is in the local government area of South Dublin. It developed from a rural village by the River Dodder, with a second settlement, Upper Fir-house, nearby. It is just outside the M50 orbital motorway, and in the postal district of Dublin 24. It is adjacent to Knocklyon (with which it shares a townland), Ballycullen, Templeogue, and Tallaght. In the historic divisions of local administration, Firhouse is in the civil parish of Tallaght and the barony of Uppercross.

== Location and access ==
=== Location ===
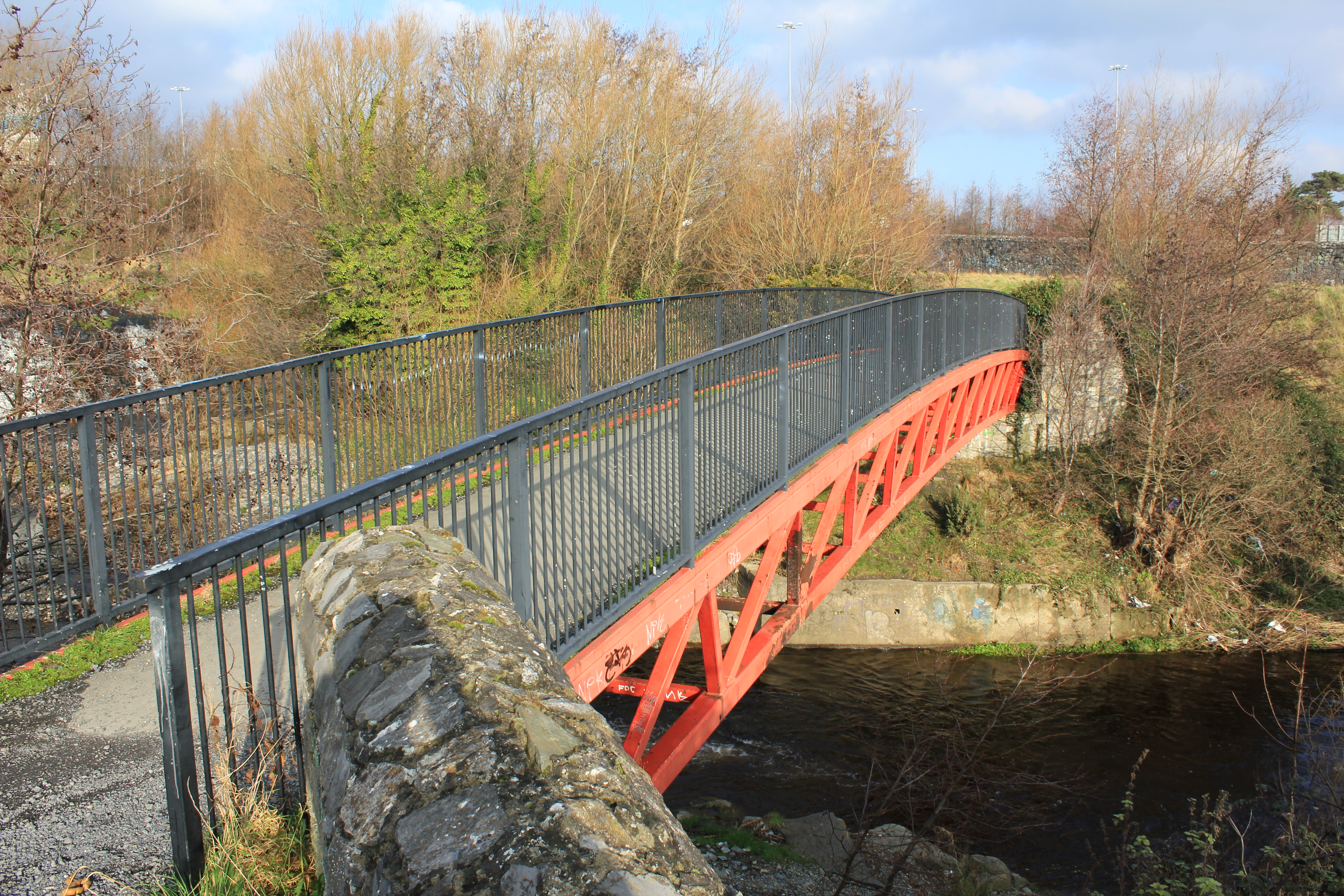
Footbridge at Firhouse over the River Dodder

Firhouse is located between Knocklyon, Ballycullen, Templeogue, and Tallaght, close to the foothills of the Dublin Mountains. Located in an area that was predominantly rural until the late 20th century, there were previously a number of mills and two hamlets in the area. It is situated on the eastern bank of the River Dodder, which separates it from Tallaght. Towards the east is Templeogue village.

=== Access ===
Firhouse is located by Junction 12 on the M50 motorway and is also served by Firhouse Road and Killininny Road. Several Dublin Bus routes reach the area, including the S6, S8, F1, 15, and 65B.

== Etymology ==
According to the Placenames Database of Ireland, the origin of the area's English name may originate from a local house, associated with a family named Fieragh, which was known as 'Fur House' during the mid-18th century. The placename, in Irish, is Teach na Giúise.

== History ==
Firhouse was historically the site of a small rural settlement near the river bank, and another, Upper Firhouse, nearby. Firhouse lay within the townland of Knocklyon and was owned, over time, by Walter de Ridelford, and later families including the Burnells, the Bathes, the Nugents and the Talbots, eventually being sold by the Duke of Wharton to the famous Speaker Conolly.

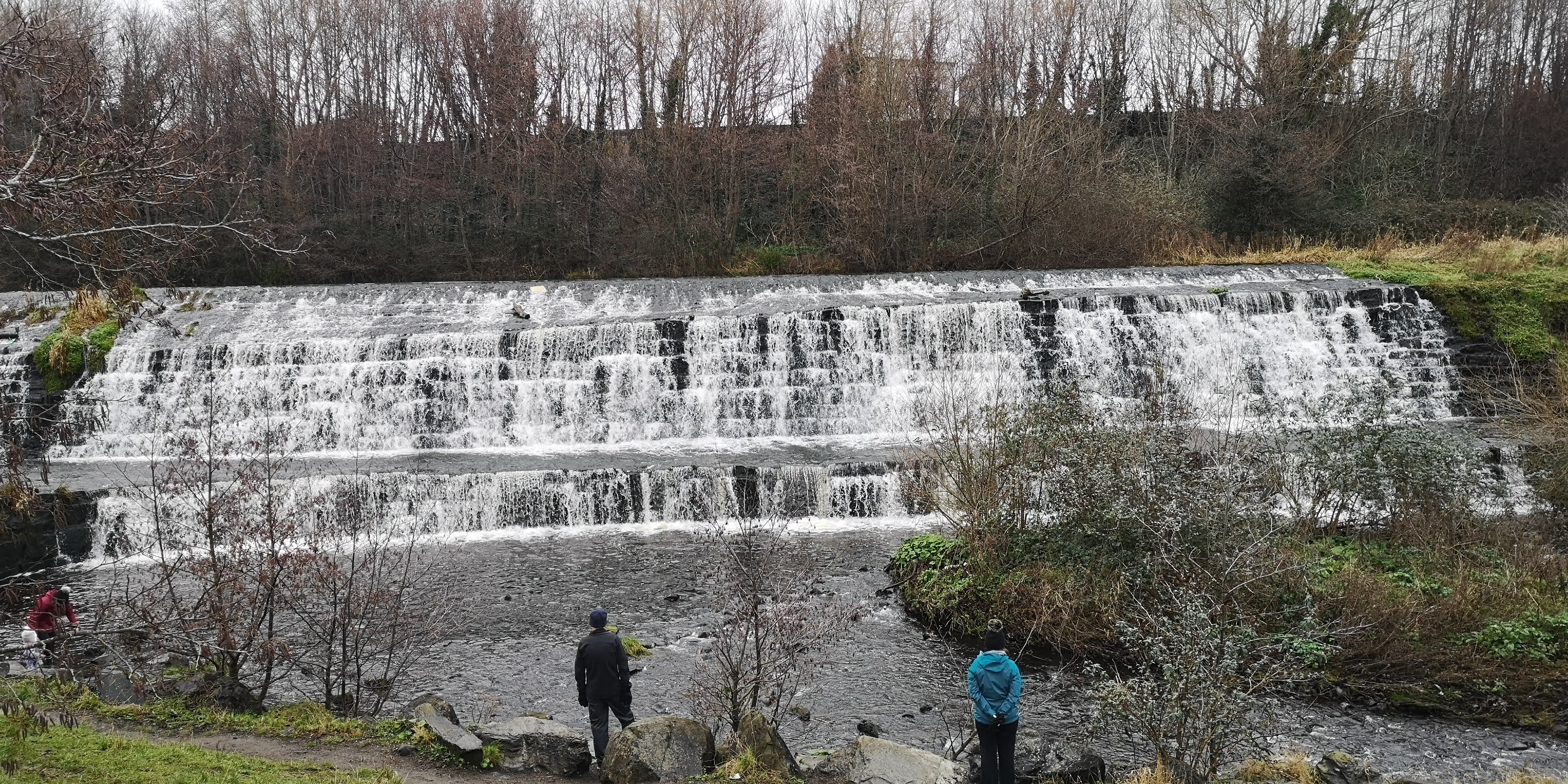
Firhouse Weir, also known as Balrothery Weir, on the River Dodder

Dated to at least the early 13th century, a weir was built in the Dodder between Firhouse and Balrothery, the district on the north bank opposite, and much of the Dodder's water was diverted to the course of the River Poddle, to supply the then-small Dublin city. The weir is known variously as Balrothery Weir, Firhouse Weir or City Weir, and was the starting point of the canal known as the City Watercourse.

In The History and Antiquities of Tallaght, County Dublin (published in the mid 19th century), George Domville Handcock refers to Firhouse as "a small dirty village, principally inhabited by stonebreakers".

While there was no bridge near in a south-westerly direction until the 20th century, a bridge was made just north of the village. The settlement grew further in the 19th century, and a number of mills existed in the vicinity, including a paper mill across the river. As of the early 1900s, the main village comprised 7 houses, two pubs and a forge.

By the 1910s, the village already extended for half a mile, with a school, church, convent, public house and two smithies, and the Moscow Dance Hall was built there in the 1930s, operating for about three years. The population remained small until rapid suburban development began in the 1970s, with large-scale housing development continuing into the 1980s.

=== Historical accounts ===
A brief history of Firhouse (as "Fir-house") is included in "The History and Antiquities of Tallaght in the County of Dublin", an account of the large historic ecclesiastical and later civil parish of Tallaght. Handcock in fact refers to two villages of Fir-house, the main settlement and another he calls "the village of Upper Fir-house."

The scholar Gerry Smyth also includes a cultural history of Firhouse in his 2001 book Space and the Irish Cultural Imagination.

=== Kearney family ===
Firhouse was the site, in 1816, of the disappearance of a gamekeeper, and the subsequent hanging of three of the Kearney family for the suspected murder involved. Following the disappearance of John Kinlen, a bloody axe was found near the Kearneys' pub in Firhouse and the Kearneys, a father and two sons, were convicted of the killing. A gallows was built at the suspected scene of the crime, outside their pub, for their hanging. When one son, William, fell through the gallows, it was discovered that he was too tall to be strangled by the rope around his neck, so a hole was dug under the gallows, and the hangman then pulled down on his legs and held onto him until he was dead. No visible reference to this incident can be found in modern Firhouse.

== Governance ==
Firhouse is in the local government area of South Dublin County Council. The local electoral area of Firhouse–Bohernabreena elects 5 councillors to south Dublin County Council. In the system of council committees, it is in the oversight of the Rathfarnham/Templeogue/Firhouse/Bohernabreena Area Committee. For strategic planning purposes, the council groups Firhouse in the extensive Templeogue/Walkinstown/Rathfarnham/Firhouse neighbourhood (the other "neighbourhoods" of the county being greater Tallaght and the broad Clondalkin area).

Firhouse is in the Dáil constituency of Dublin South-West.

== Amenities ==
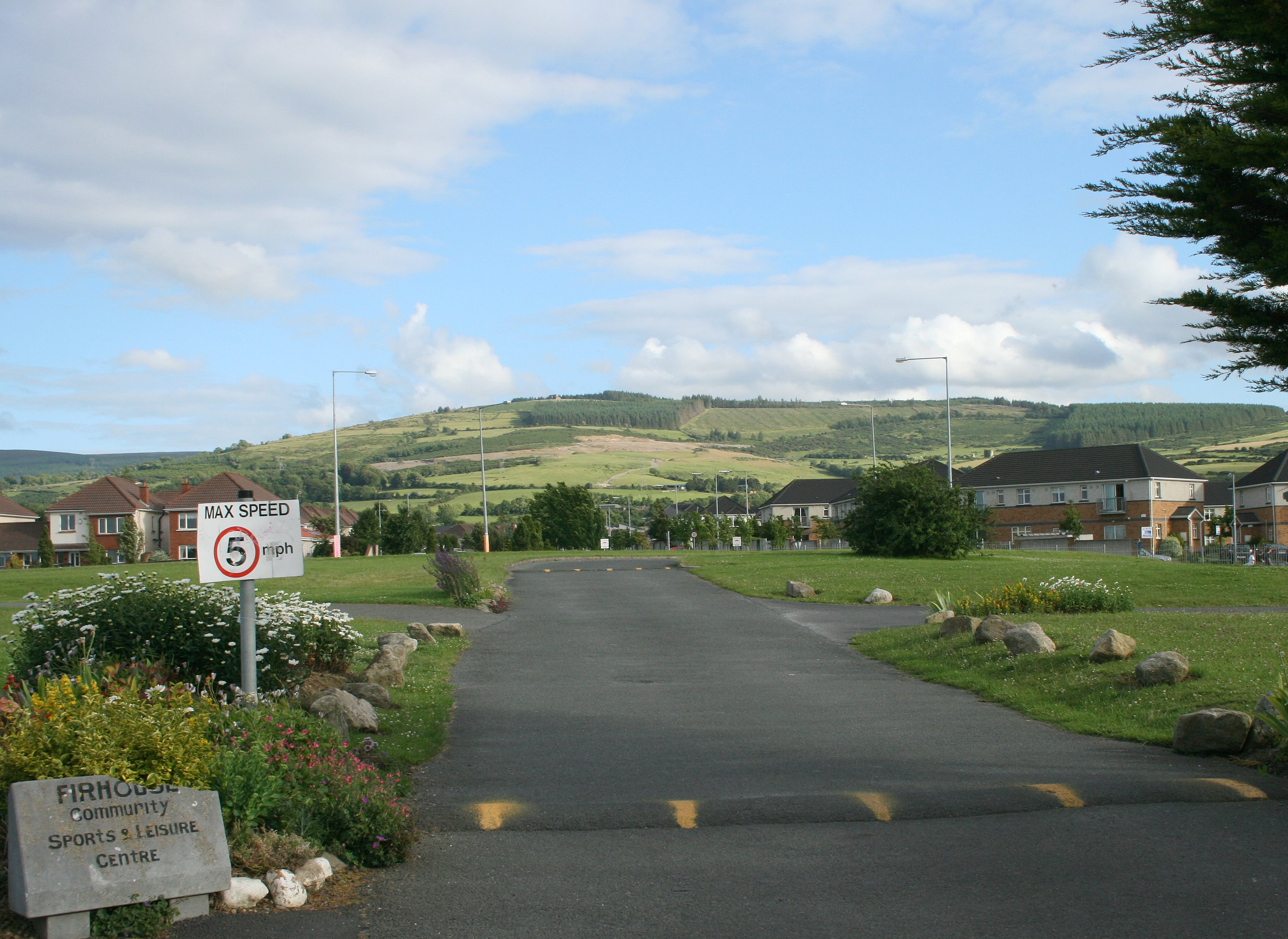
Housing near Firhouse Community Centre and Sports Complex

There are two community centres, Firhouse Community and Sports Complex, which is home to various sporting teams and the local Scouting Den, and The Park Community Centre, which lies in Ballycragh Park. The Community and Sports Centre was built by Firhouse Community Council.

Firhouse also has one main shopping centre, Firhouse Shopping Centre, anchored by a supermarket. There is also a local credit union, a post office and a Chinese restaurant, while the local pubs are Scholars, The Speaker Conolly, Mortons and the Firhouse Inn. The area is served by a once-a-week Mobile Library stop.

Two community groups have registered with the local authority, the voluntary group Firhouse Village Community Council, and the civic activity group Firhouse Tidy Towns. In 2003, grant aid from an EU Urban and Village Renewal Scheme was obtained for "Firhouse Village Park".

== Education ==
=== Primary schools ===
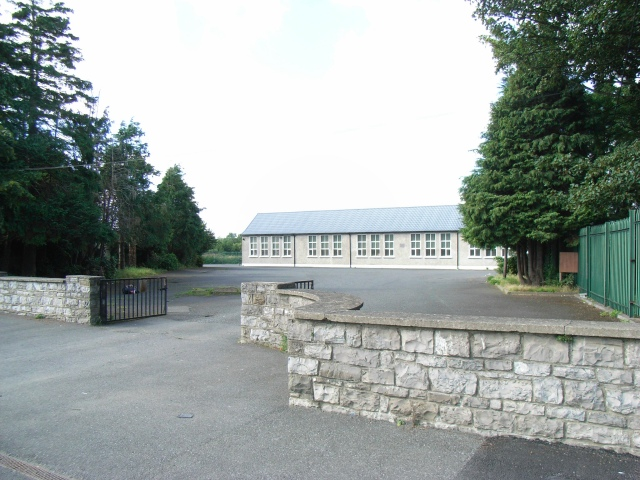
Scoil Carmel, Firhouse

Local primary schools are Scoil Carmel (a Junior National School), Scoil Treasa, Holy Rosary, Firhouse Educate Together National School, Gaelscoil na Giuise.

Scoil Carmel is a junior national school, offering education from junior infants to second class (ages 4 to 8). Scoil Treasa covers third class to sixth class (8 to 12-year-olds).

Gaelscoil na Giúise is a multi-denominational, co-educational Irish language primary school (a gaelscoil), which opened in September 2013. The school is located off Ballycullen Drive and Killininny Road, in a purpose-built 16-classroom building, including a 2-classroom Special Needs Unit.

Firhouse Educate Together National School (FETNS) is an Educate Together school which opened in September 2013.

=== Secondary education ===
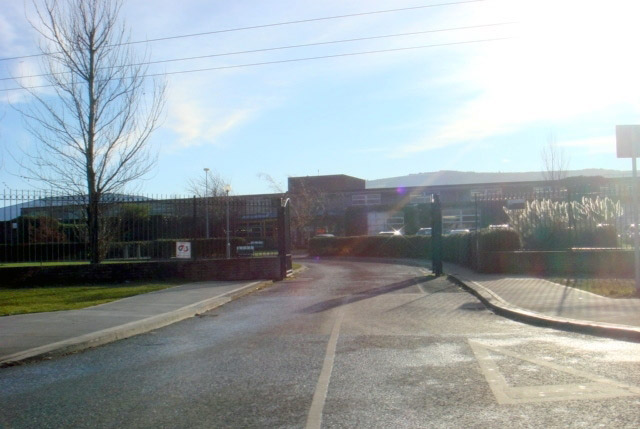
Firhouse College

The local secondary school, Firhouse Community College, was established in 1982, launching in September of that year. As of 2018, the school had approximately 780 students enrolled. The school contains a theatre, physical education hall, a multi-sport arena and a large playing field which is used for soccer and rugby matches.

Firhouse Educate Together Secondary School (FETSS) was established in 2018. It got a permanent site for the school building in 2022.

== Religion ==
The Catholic parish of Firhouse stretches out as far as Hunterswood and has a church named Our Lady of Mount Carmel. When the parish was formed, it extended to "all of the townland of Tymon South and part of the townlands of Knocklyon, Ballycragh, Killininny, Templeogue and a little of that of Tallaght". Various regions of Firhouse today belong in the Catholic structure to the Parish of Ballyboden while Bohernabreena Parish also takes up much of the area, with a church in the mountains and another in Holy Rosary school. Historically the broad area was part of the large post-Penal Law parish of Rathfarnham.

In the valley, adjacent to the Dodder, stood the Victory Centre, a Christian theological facility, and subsequent to its closure, in 2017 a facility of the Church of Scientology opened on its site.

== Sport ==
Firhouse Carmel Football Club, based at Firhouse Community Centre, caters for schoolboys and girls from the local area. Its playing grounds are at Carrigwood and Scholars pitches, and 2005 saw Brian Kerr open the purpose-built changing rooms at the Community Centre after years of fundraising. Local side Firhouse Clover fields teams in the Leinster Senior League.

Ballyboden St Enda's GAA, located on Firhouse Road, and St Anne's GAA, located in Bohernabreena, are Gaelic Athletic Association clubs in the area, fielding camogie, hurling and Gaelic football teams.

Firhouse also has a basketball club, and Firhouse Community College has GAA and basketball teams.

== People ==
Former or current residents of the suburb have included:

- Dave Allen, comedian
- Jim Bartley, actor
- Gavin Bazunu, footballer
- Hazel Chu, politician
- Eoin Doyle, footballer
- Sean Hughes, comedian
- Eoghan McDermott, broadcaster
- Graham Shaw, hockey player and coach
- Paul Tylak, comedian
- David Webster, footballer
