= List of Dublin postal districts =

Dublin
- Post town
- Postcode areas: D1, D2, D3, D4, D5, D6, D6W, D7, D8, D9, D10, D11, D12, D13, D14, D15, D16, D17, D18, D20, D22, D24. Codes A41 – K78 later added under the Eircode system.

Dublin postal districts have been used by An Post, Ireland's postal service, to sort mail for addresses in Dublin. The system is similar to that used in cities in Europe and North America until they adopted national postal code systems in the 1960s and 1970s. These were incorporated into a new national postcode system, known as Eircode, which was implemented in 2015. Under the Eircode system, the city is covered by the original routing areas D01 to D24, along with A## and K## codes for locations elsewhere in County Dublin.

== History ==
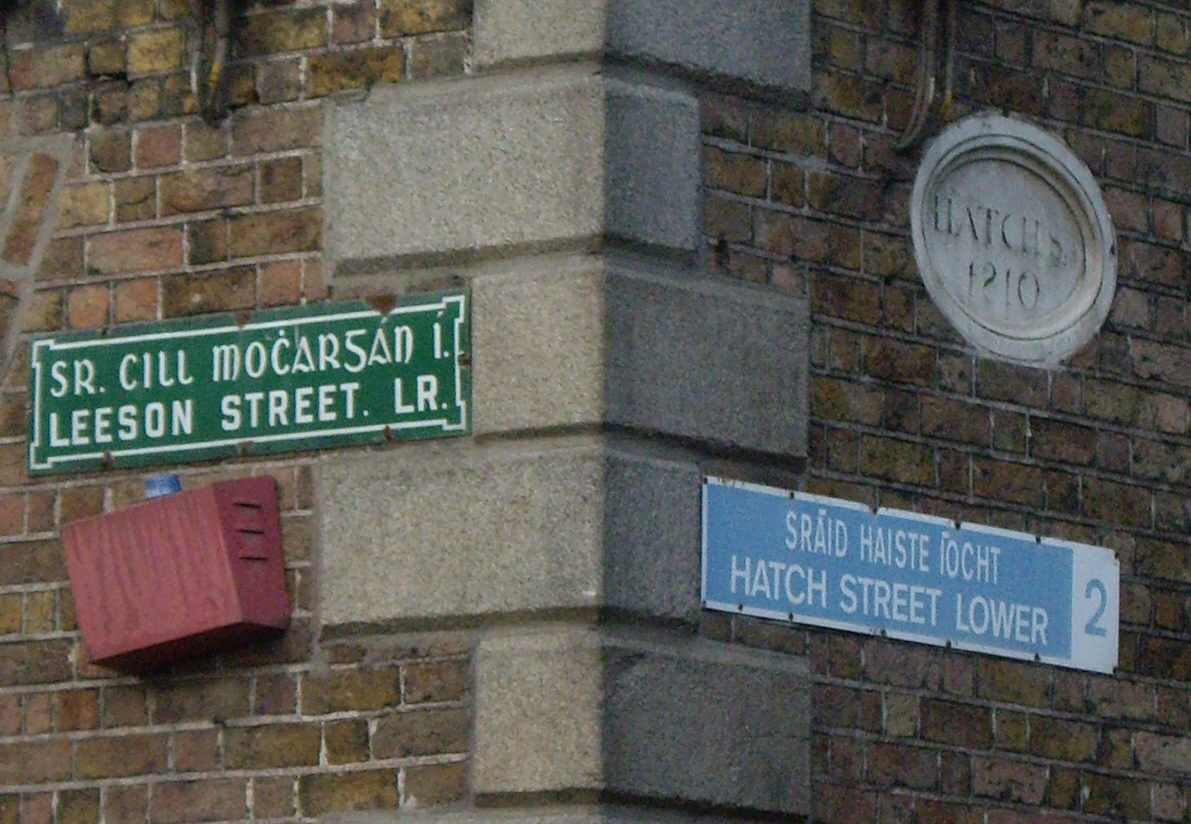
The green Leeson Street nameplate predates postal districts. The newer blue Hatch Street nameplate indicates the district is Dublin 2.

The postal district system was introduced in 1917 by the British government, as a practical way to organise local postal distribution. This followed the example of other cities, including London, first subdivided into ten districts in 1857, and Liverpool, the first city in Britain or Ireland to have postcodes, from 1864. The letter "D" was assigned to designate Dublin and was retained by the new Irish government.

Dublin began to use postal district numbers in 1927 when the Department of Posts and Telegraphs initiated a scheme that requested senders to add a code to each address in Dublin City and suburbs. When mail was addressed in English senders were to add an appropriate postman's walk number but when addressed in Irish, different letters were used with the same walk numbers, such as Rathgar Road being D3 on mail addresses in English but S3 on Irish addressed mail. This scheme was not popular and within a few years became defunct. In 1961, new postal district numbers started and these numbers were added to street signs prior to which street signs only displayed the street name in Irish and English.

The number of districts increased as the city grew, and in the 1970s, large districts were subdivided. Dublin 5 was split, with the coastal part retaining the "5" and the inland part becoming Dublin 17. Dublin 8, Ballyfermot became Dublin 10, along with Palmerstown and Chapelizod. Dublin 10 was split again later, with Palmerstown and Chapelizod forming Dublin 20.

In 1985, Dublin 6 was divided, with some areas, such as Templeogue, Kimmage and Terenure becoming part of a new district in order to facilitate the processing of mail by a new delivery office for those areas. Residents of some areas objected to the assignation of the next available number, "Dublin 26", for the new postal district, citing property devaluation: the higher numbered districts typically represented less affluent and less central areas. An Post ultimately relented, and the western part of the district became known as Dublin 6W.

== Structure ==
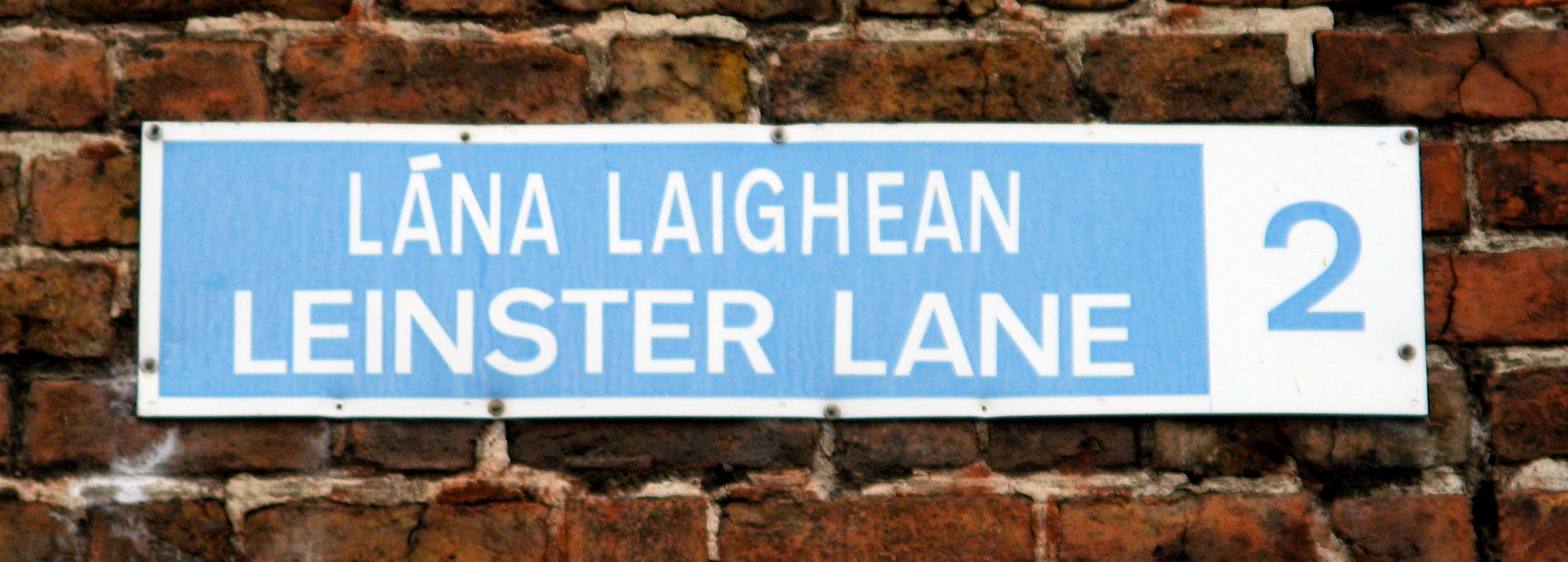
Street sign in Dublin, displaying name of the street in Irish and English, with postal district number

Historically, the postal district appeared with one or two digits (or in the case of one district, a digit and a letter) at the end of addresses:

Sample Address, Sample Street, Dublin 8

Under the Eircode postcode system, the postal district number is retained in Dublin addresses, e.g.:

Sample Address, Sample Street, Dublin 8, D08 1X2Y

As a general rule, odd numbers are used for addresses on the northside of the River Liffey, while even numbers are on addresses on the southside. Exceptions to this are the Phoenix Park (along with a small area between the Park and the River Liffey), and Chapelizod Village which, although on the Northside, are parts of the Dublin 8 and Dublin 20 postal districts respectively.

The numbering system is not used for some areas in County Dublin, such as Dún Laoghaire, Blackrock, Lucan or Swords, though it is used for other county locations, for example Firhouse, Foxrock, Sandyford, Knocklyon and Tallaght.

Dublin's postal districts
Northside, covering local government area	Southside, covering local government area
Dublin 1 (D1) Dublin	Dublin 2 (D2) Dublin
Dublin 3 (D3) Dublin	Dublin 4 (D4) Dublin, Dún Laoghaire– Rathdown
Dublin 5 (D5) Dublin	Dublin 6 (D6) Dublin, Dún Laoghaire– Rathdown
Dublin 7 (D7) Dublin	Dublin 6W (D6W) Dublin, South Dublin
Dublin 9 (D9) Dublin, Fingal	Dublin 8 (D8) Dublin
Dublin 11 (D11) Dublin, Fingal	Dublin 10 (D10) Dublin
Dublin 13 (D13) Dublin, Fingal	Dublin 12 (D12) Dublin, South Dublin
Dublin 15 (D15) Dublin, Fingal	Dublin 14 (D14) Dublin, Dún Laoghaire–Rathdown, South Dublin
Dublin 17 (D17) Dublin, Fingal	Dublin 16 (D16) Dún Laoghaire–Rathdown, South Dublin
	Dublin 18 (D18) Dún Laoghaire–Rathdown
Dublin 20 (D20) Dublin, Fingal, South Dublin
Dublin 22 (D22) Dublin, South Dublin
Dublin 24 (D24) South Dublin
"County Dublin"; Fingal, South Dublin, Dún Laoghaire–Rathdown, and small pockets of Meath

Publicly distributed leaflet to publicise the Dublin Postal Districts issued by the Minister for Posts and Telegraphs, dated April 1976. At this time, D6W, D22, and D17 did not yet exist.

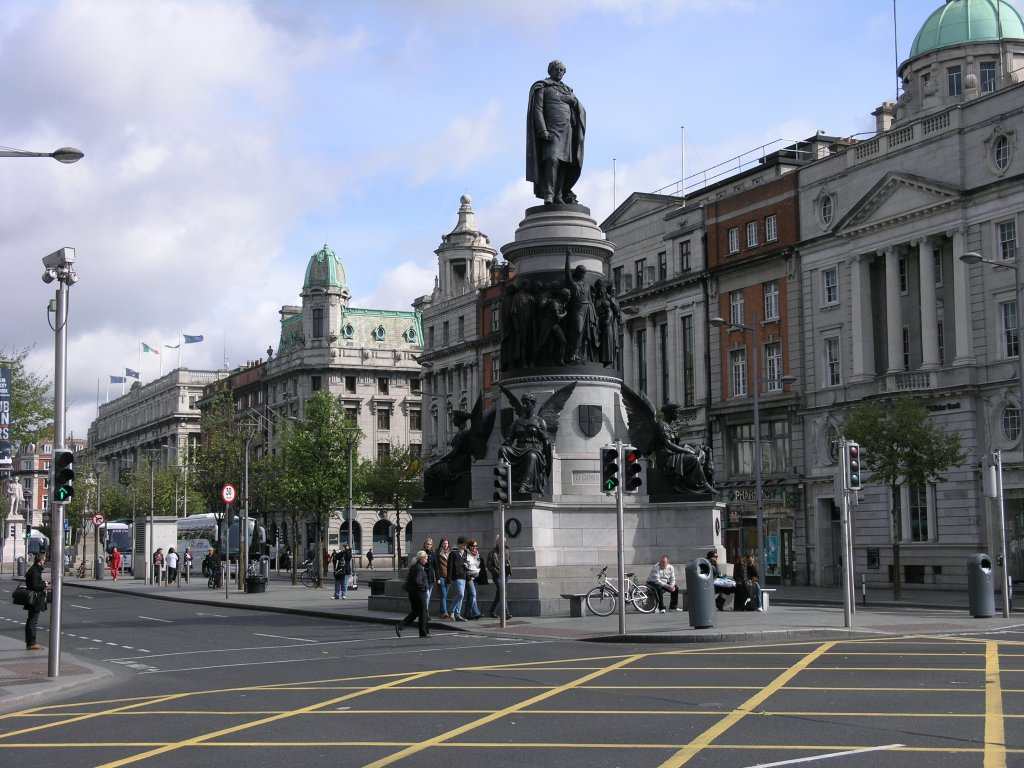
O'Connell Street in Dublin 1

== Dublin 1 (D1) ==
Dublin 1 includes most of the city centre north of the River Liffey, including Abbey Street, Amiens Street, parts of North Strand, Capel Street, Dorset Street, Henry Street and Mary Street, Mountjoy Square, Marlborough Street, North Wall, O'Connell Street, Parnell Square, and Talbot Street. This area include the General Post Office, from which distances are measured.

== Dublin 2 (D2) ==
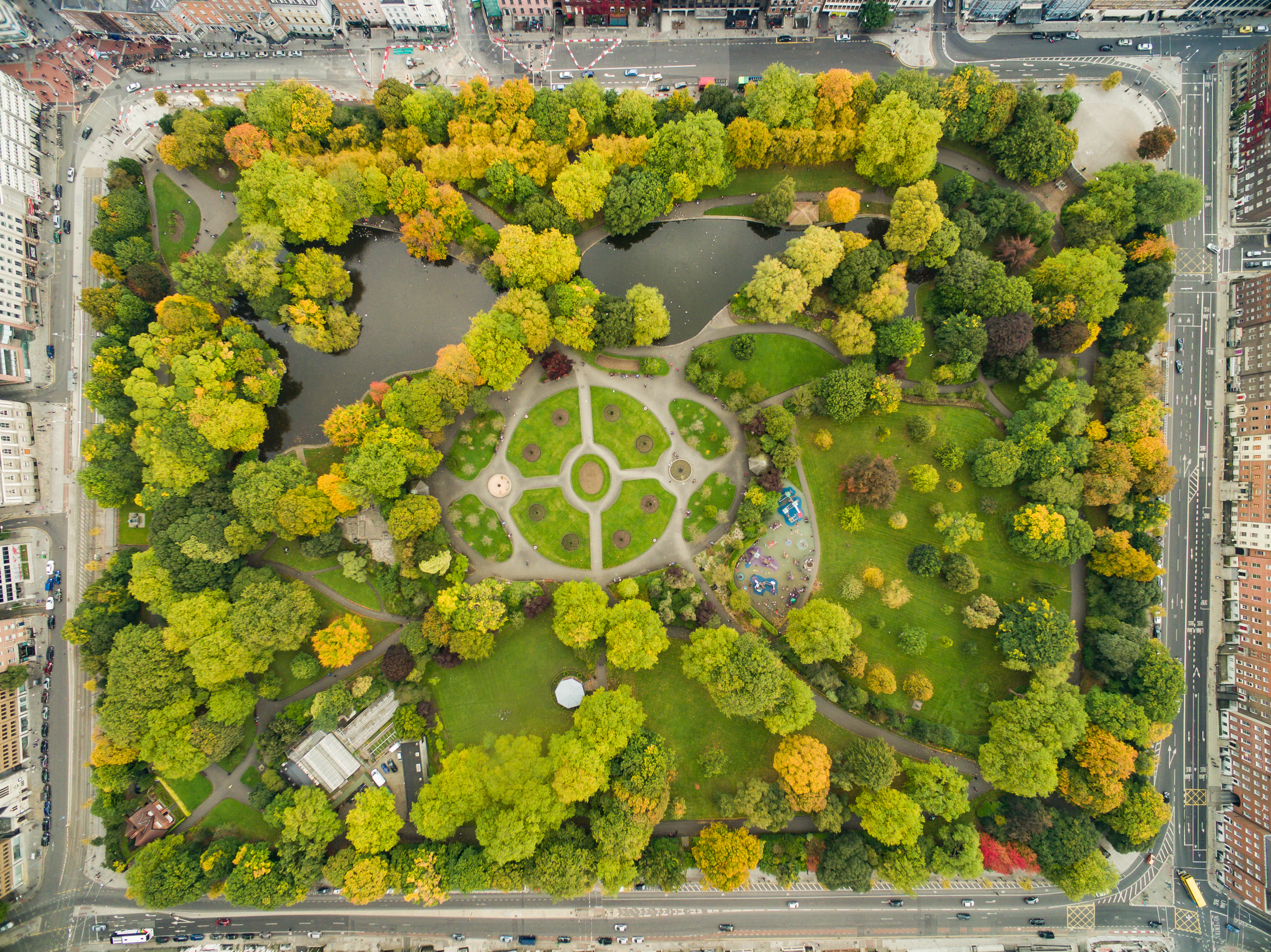
St Stephen's Green in Dublin 2

Dublin 2 includes most of the city centre south of the River Liffey and takes in areas around Merrion Square, Trinity College, Temple Bar, Grafton Street, St Stephen's Green, Dame Street, and Leeson Street. Dublin 2 also covers the Grand Canal Dock and the City Quay areas. Dublin 2 is the location of a number of government departments and addresses such as Leinster House, Government Buildings, and the Mansion House. The borders of Dublin 2 are the Liffey in the north, the Grand Canal to the south and east and Aungier, Wexford and Camden Streets to the west.

== Dublin 3 (D3) ==
Dublin 3 includes areas such as Ballybough, Clonliffe, Clontarf, Dollymount, East Wall (including East Point), Fairview, parts of Drumcondra, most of Killester, most of North Strand, and Marino.

== Dublin 4 (D4) ==
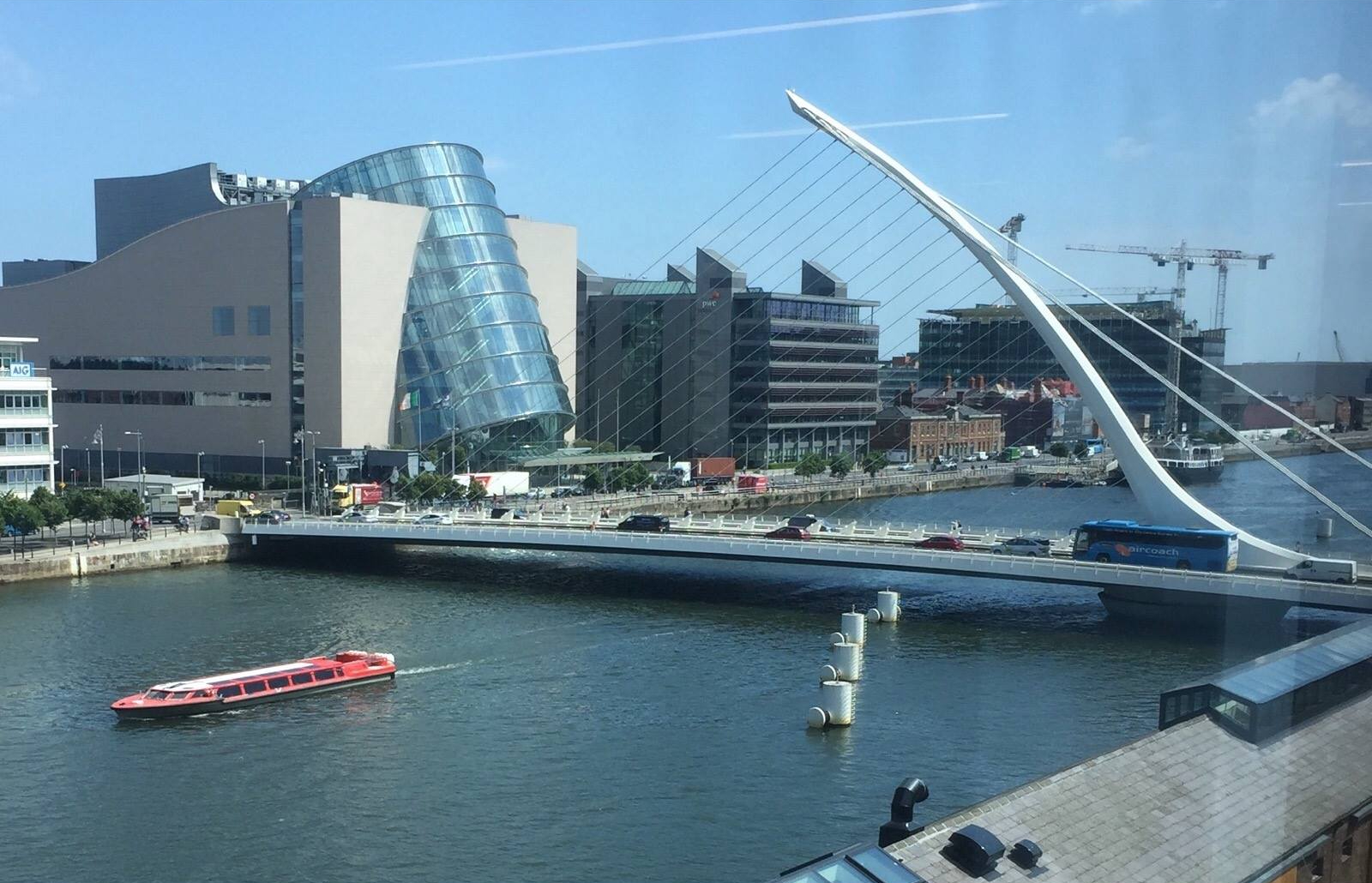
The Dublin Docklands span D1, D2, and pockets of D4.

Dublin 4 includes Ballsbridge, Belfield, Donnybrook, Irishtown, Merrion, Pembroke, Ringsend, and Sandymount and contains the RDS grounds, Aviva Stadium (formerly Lansdowne Road stadium), and many embassies. Long considered the city's wealthiest postcode, "Dublin 4" has acquired its own socio-economic identity.

== Dublin 5 (D5) ==
Dublin 5 includes Artane, (Note: Note: Most of the civil parish of Artaine – the townlands of Artaine South, Artaine West and Puckstown – is within Dublin 9.) central Coolock, parts of Beaumont, Harmonstown, Kilbarrack, parts of Killester, and Raheny.

== Dublin 6 (D6) ==
Dublin 6 includes Milltown, Ranelagh, parts of Terenure, parts of Harold's Cross, Rathmines (including Dartry), and Rathgar.

== Dublin 6 West (D6W) ==
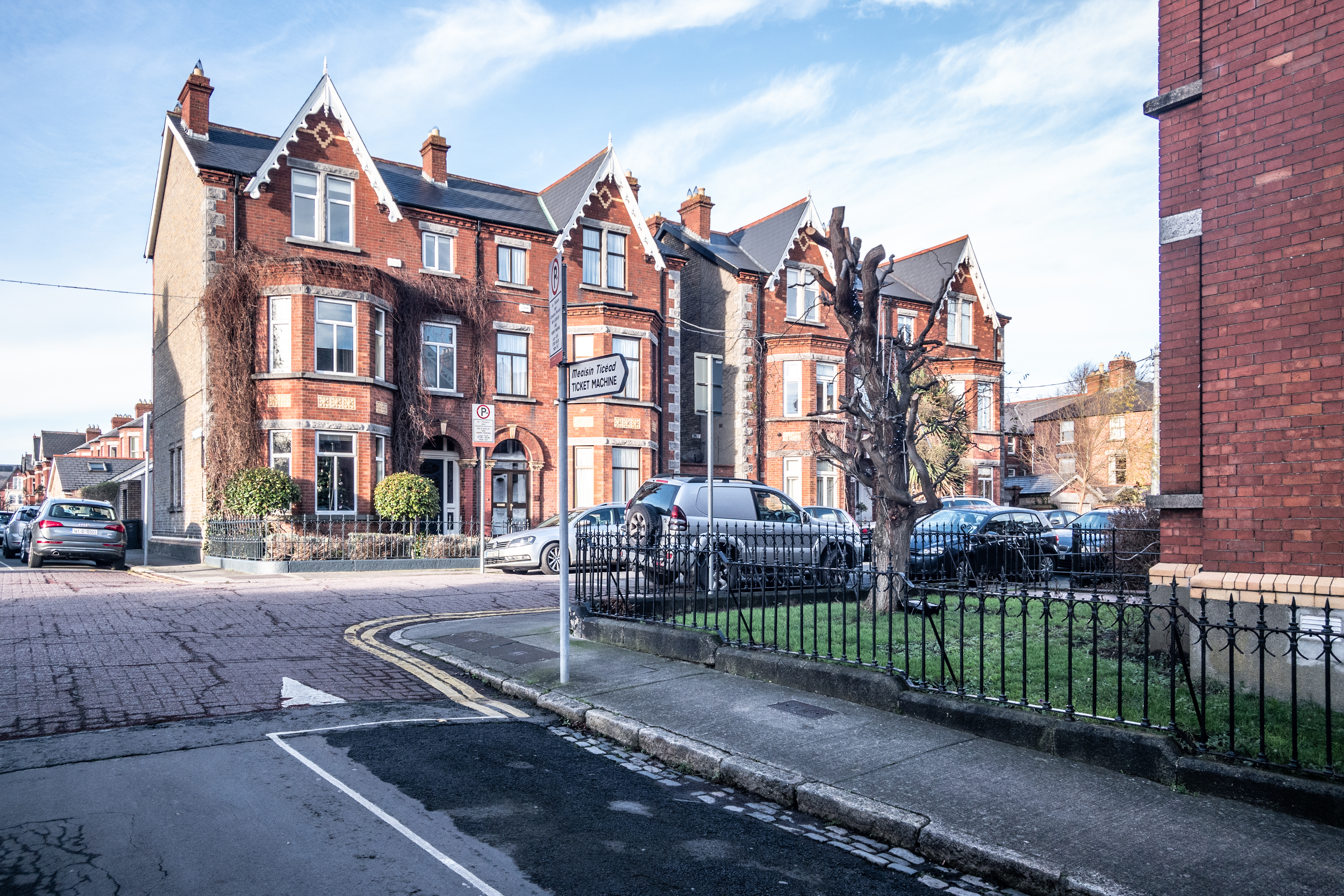
Edwardian-era houses in Terenure, D6W

Dublin 6 West includes most of Harold's Cross, Templeogue, most of Kimmage, and most of Terenure.

== Dublin 7 (D7) ==
Dublin 7 includes Arbour Hill, parts of Ashtown, Broadstone, Cabra, Grangegorman, Oxmantown, Phibsborough, Smithfield, and Stoneybatter.

== Dublin 8 (D8) ==
Dublin 8 includes Dolphin's Barn, most of Inchicore, Islandbridge, most of Kilmainham, Merchants Quay, Portobello, South Circular Road, the Phoenix Park, and The Liberties. Notable buildings include Christ Church Cathedral and St Patrick's Cathedral. It is one of only two postal districts to span the Liffey.

== Dublin 9 (D9) ==
Dublin 9 includes parts of Ballymun east of Ballymun Road (Shangan and Coultry), Beaumont, Donnycarney, most of Drumcondra, Elm Mount, Griffith Avenue, parts of Glasnevin (St Mobhi, Botanic Gardens and Met Éireann), Santry, and Whitehall.

== Dublin 10 (D10) ==
Dublin 10 includes Ballyfermot, parts of Chapelizod, parts of Kilmainham, and most of Cherry Orchard.

== Dublin 11 (D11) ==
Dublin 11 includes most of Ballymun west of Ballymun Road (Sillogue, Balcurris, Balbutcher, Poppintree, Sandyhill and Wadelai), Dubber Cross, Finglas, Ballygall and Cappagh, most of Glasnevin (Cremore, Addison, Violet Hill, Willow Park, Finglas Road, Old Finglas Road and Glasnevin Cemetery), Kilshane Cross, The Ward, and Coolquay.

== Dublin 12 (D12) ==
Dublin 12 includes Bluebell, Crumlin, parts of Inchicore, parts of Harold's Cross, parts of Kimmage and most of Ballymount, Drimnagh, Greenhills, Perrystown, and Walkinstown.

== Dublin 13 (D13) ==
Dublin 13 includes Baldoyle, Bayside, parts of Coolock, Donaghmede, Clongriffin, Sutton, Howth, Portmarnock, and Ayrfield.

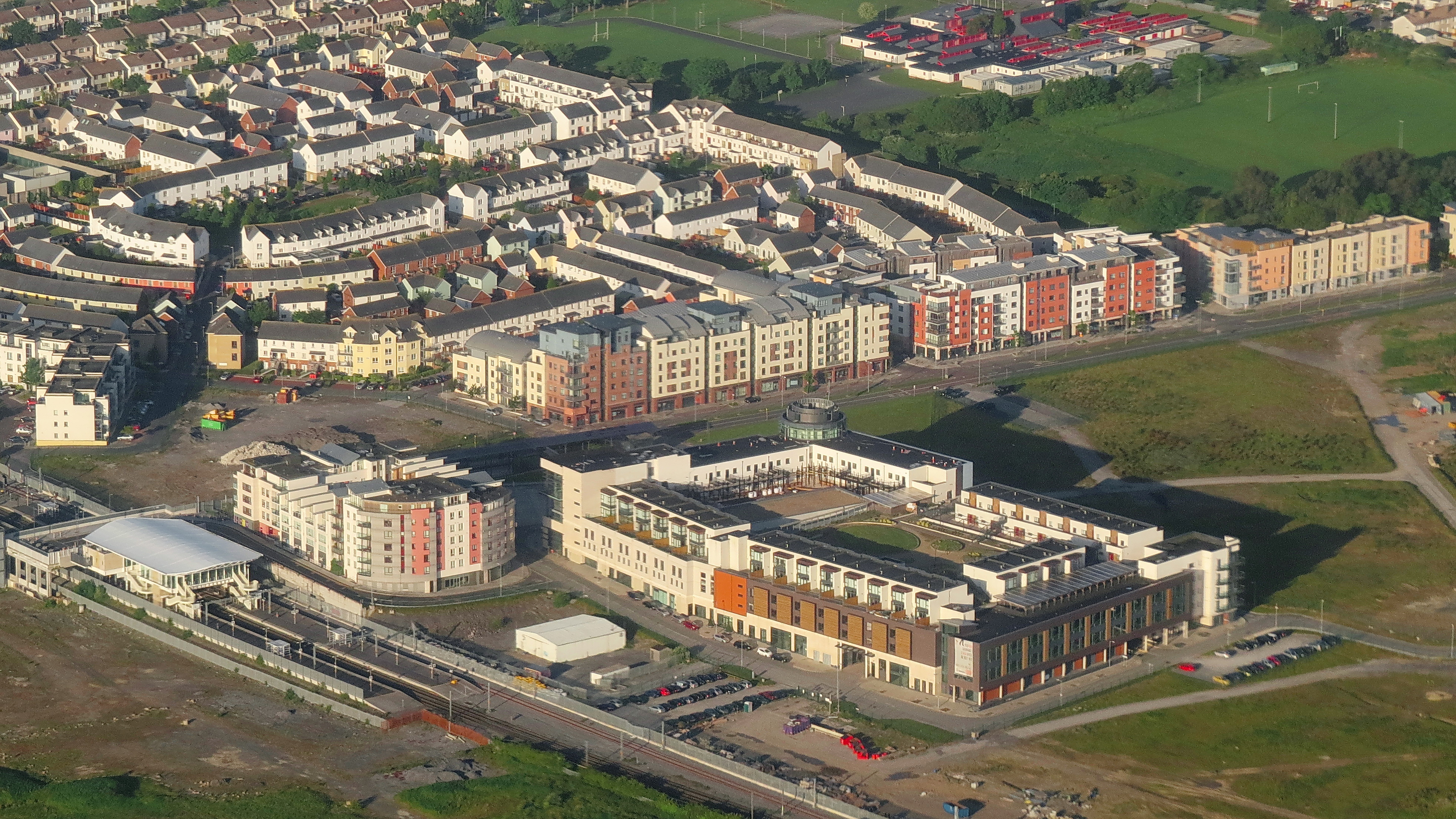
Clongriffin in D13

== Dublin 14 (D14) ==
Dublin 14 includes Churchtown, Clonskeagh, most of Dundrum, Goatstown, lower Rathfarnham, and Windy Arbour.

== Dublin 15 (D15) ==
Dublin 15 includes most of Ashtown, Blanchardstown, Castleknock, Coolmine, Clonsilla, Corduff, Mulhuddart, Tyrrelstown, and Ongar. While the town of Clonee is located in Dublin's neighbouring County Meath, for mailing purposes it is designated as D15. This leads to a mailing quirk whereby the town's addresses could be verbalised as ending with, "County Meath, Dublin 15".

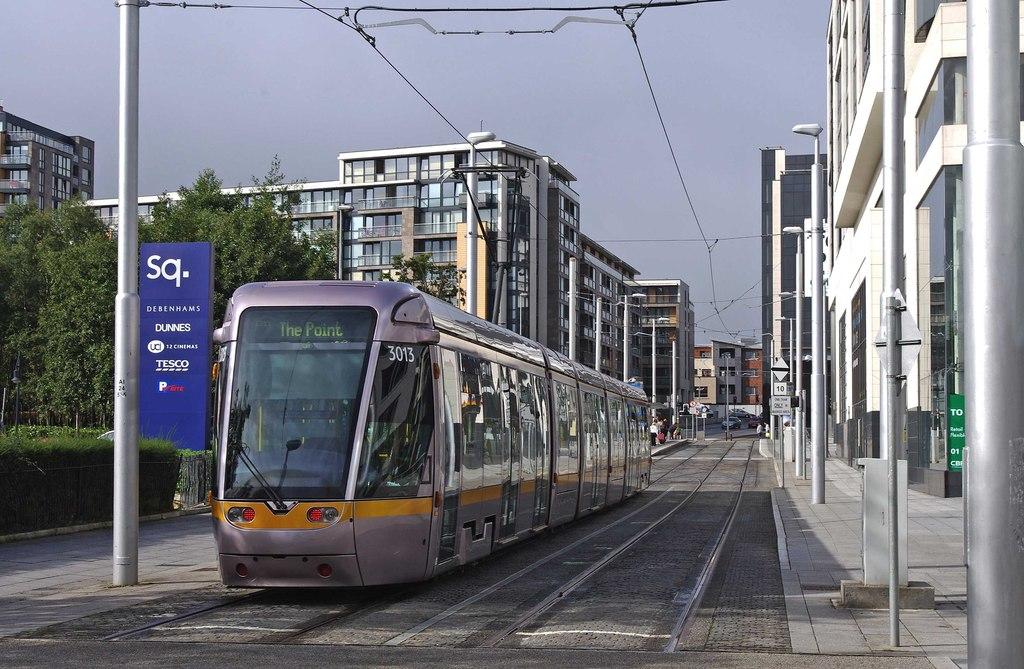
Tallaght in D24

== Dublin 16 (D16) ==
Dublin 16 includes Ballinteer, parts of Ballycullen, Ballyboden, Dundrum, Kilmashogue, Knocklyon, upper Rathfarnham, Edmondstown, and Rockbrook.

== Dublin 17 (D17) ==
Dublin 17 includes Balgriffin, most of Coolock, Belcamp, Darndale, Priorswood, and Riverside.

== Dublin 18 (D18) ==
Dublin 18 includes Cabinteely, Carrickmines, Cherrywood, Foxrock, Loughlinstown, Kilternan, Sandyford, Shankill, Ticknock, Ballyedmonduff, Stepaside, and Leopardstown.

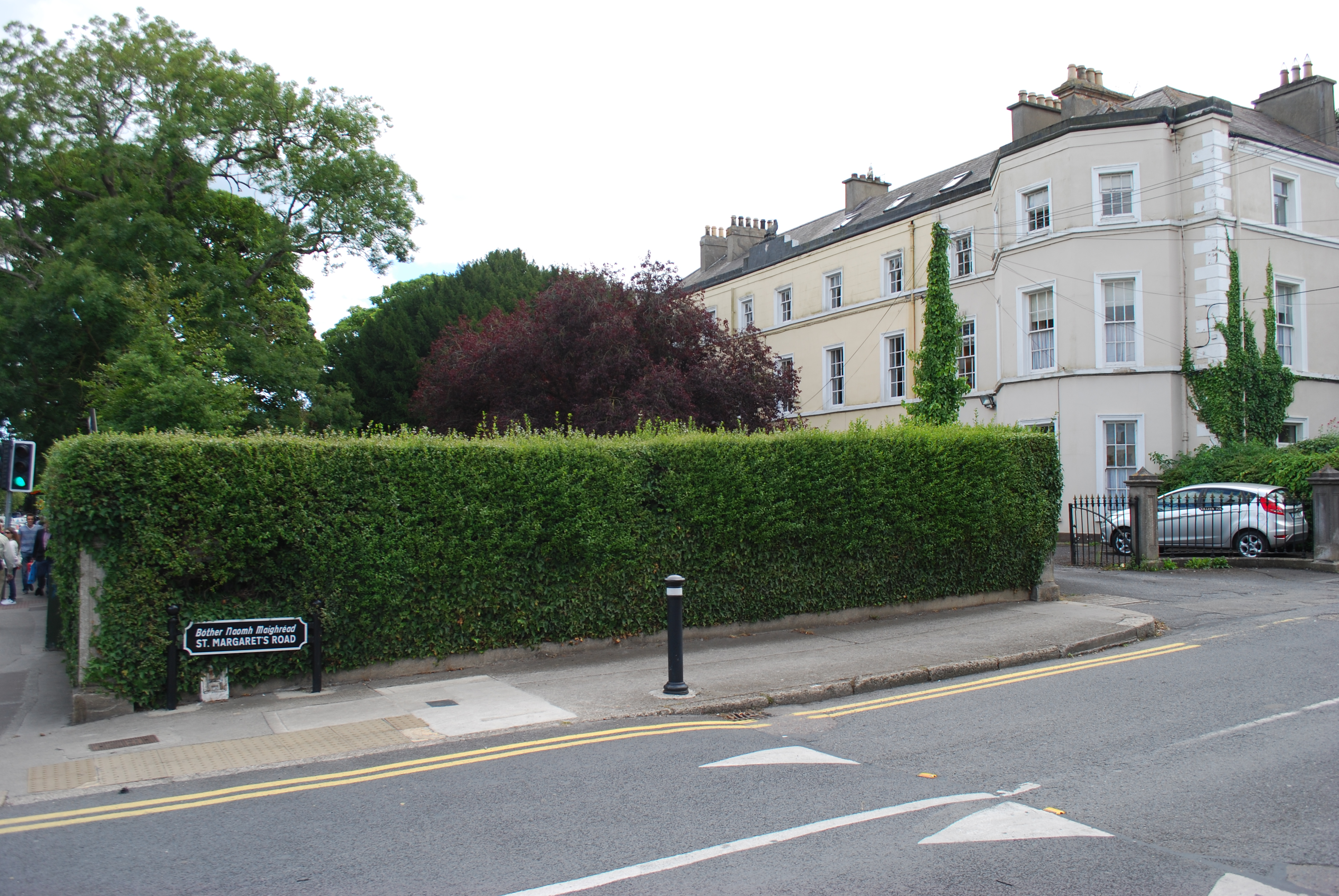
Malahide in County Dublin (K36)

== Dublin 20 (D20) ==
Dublin 20 includes most of Chapelizod, most of Palmerstown, and Strawberry Beds. This is one of only two postal districts to span the Liffey.

== Dublin 22 (D22) ==
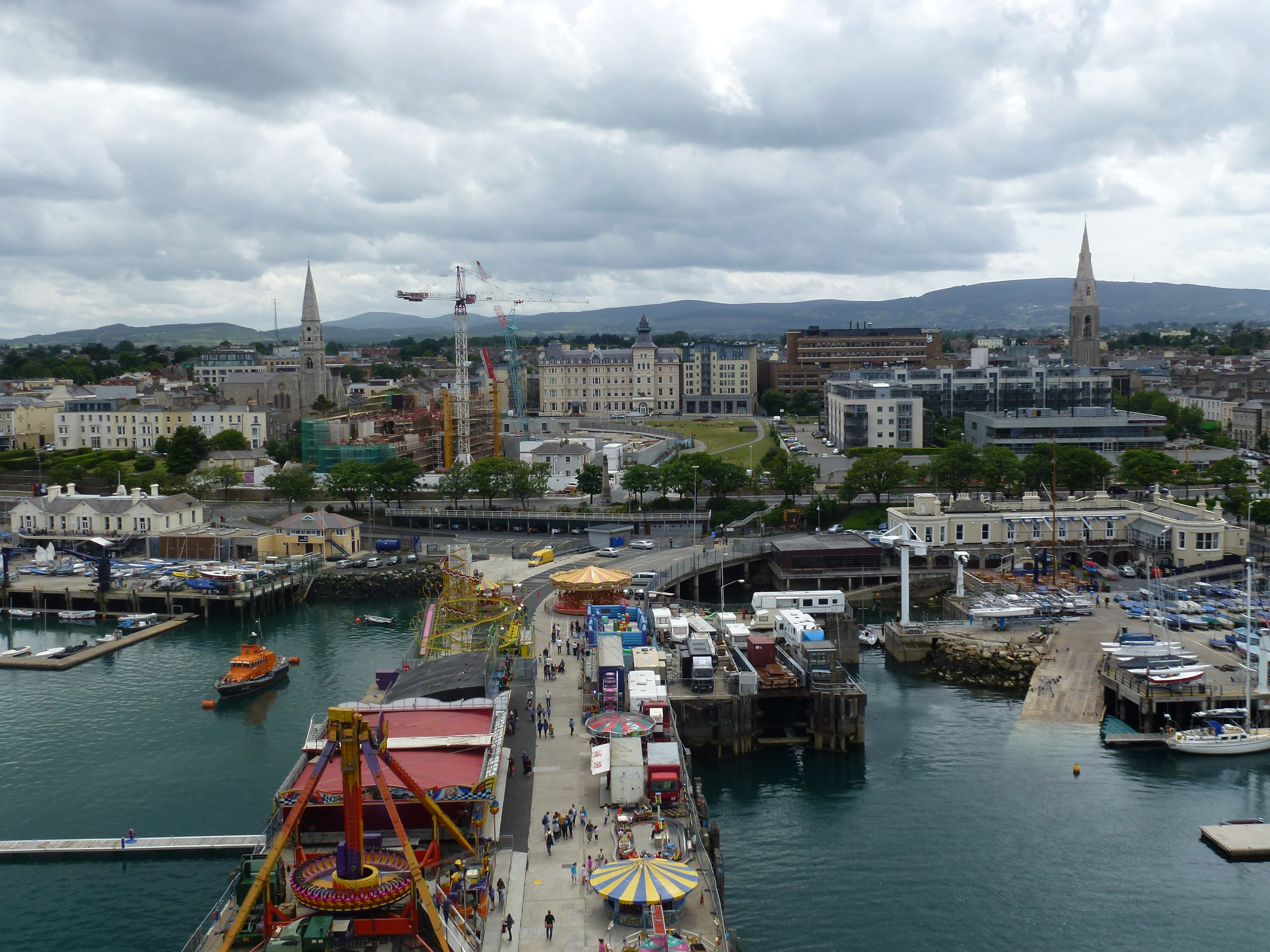
Dún Laoghaire in County Dublin (A96)

Dublin 22 includes Clondalkin, parts of Palmerstown, parts of Cherry Orchard, Liffey Valley, Newcastle, and Neilstown.

== Dublin 24 (D24) ==
Dublin 24 includes most of Ballycullen, Firhouse, Jobstown, Old Bawn, Tallaght, parts of Ballymount, Saggart, Rathcoole, and Brittas.

== County Dublin (A41–K78) ==
Routing areas of County Dublin after the implementation of Eircode

These areas do not fall inside the historic Dublin postal districts and their postal routing keys came about through the new Eircode system. This is because many of these suburbs and towns fell outside the purview of Dublin city in the past. Today, they form part of "A" and "K" Dublin Eircode areas. There are 12 of these districts in total. Notable locales include Blackrock, Dún Laoghaire, Malahide, Swords, Lucan, Rush and Balbriggan. While a small part of Bray lies in Dún Laoghaire–Rathdown, for mailing purposes, the entirety of Bray is in County Wicklow's A98 routing area.

== Later developments ==
Successive Ministers for Communications since 2005 announced plans to introduce a full postcode system across the state.

On 8 October 2013, Minister for Communications, Energy and Natural Resources, Pat Rabbitte announced a postcode system for the entire country. This came into effect during 2015 and gave an individual post code to every address in Ireland. The pre-existing Dublin district numbers are a component of the full postcode for relevant addresses, forming part of the routing code, the first three characters of the code. For example, a code for an address in Dublin 1 would start with D01, followed by four characters, hence Dublin D01 B2CD.

== Marketing ==
The districts are sometimes used in a manner similar to the sub-districts of the London postal district whereby they replace a placename. A property might be described as being "in D4", for example. This public awareness of Dublin postal districts allows occasional use in marketing. Dublin n is usually abbreviated to Dn, with examples including the "D7 Restaurant", "Dtwo" nightclub, or "D4 Hotels".

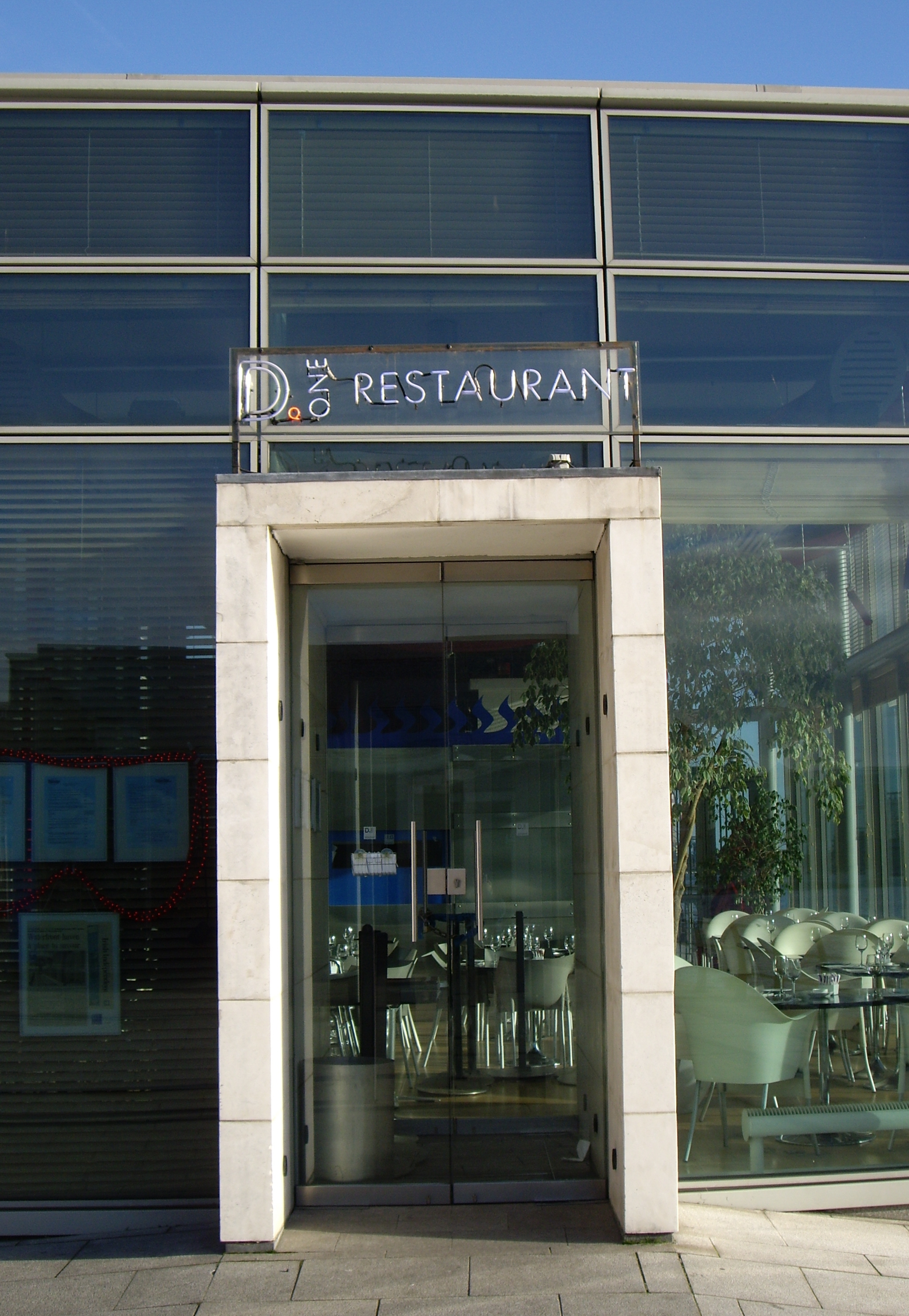
D One restaurant

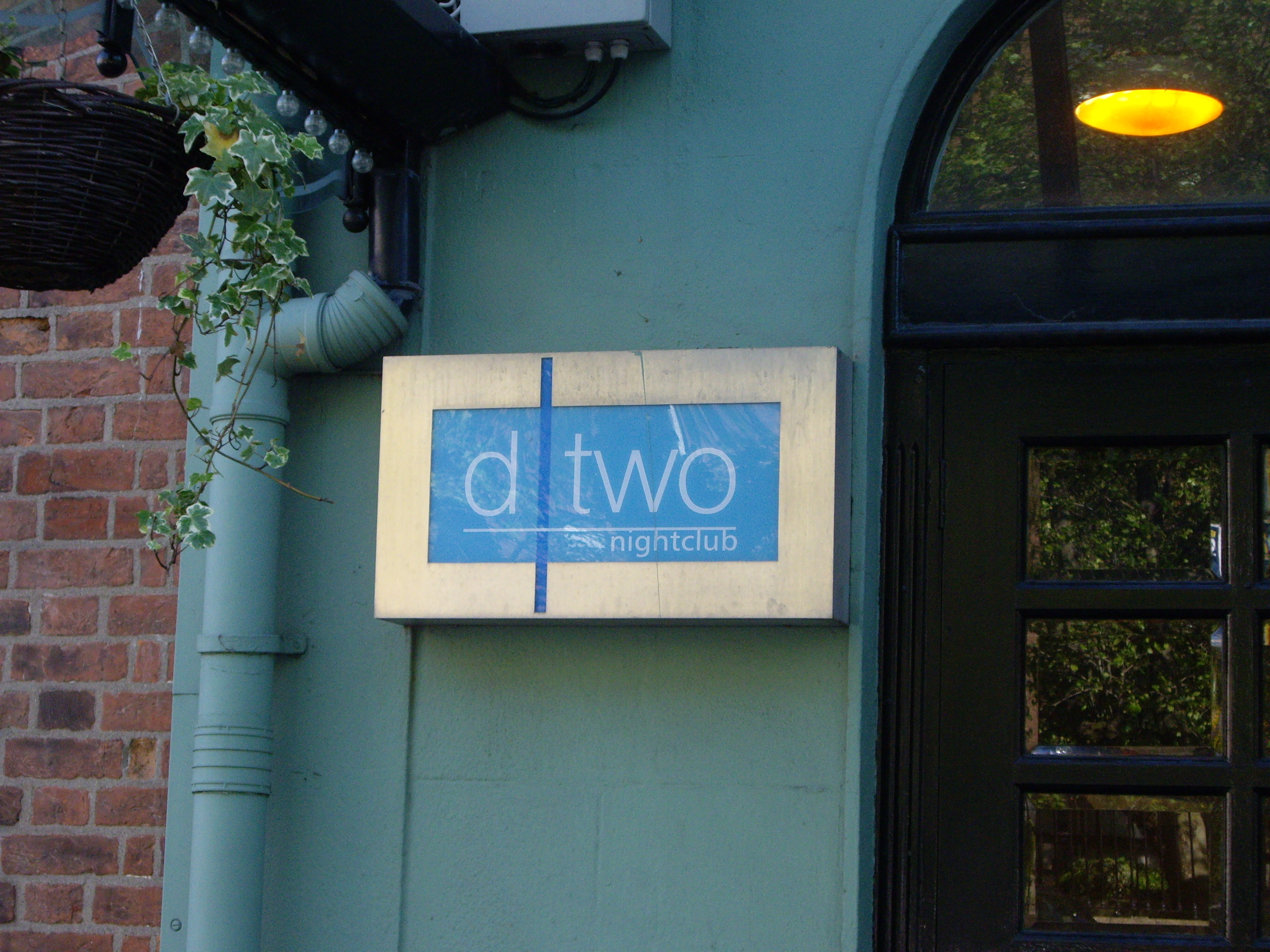
Dtwo nightclub

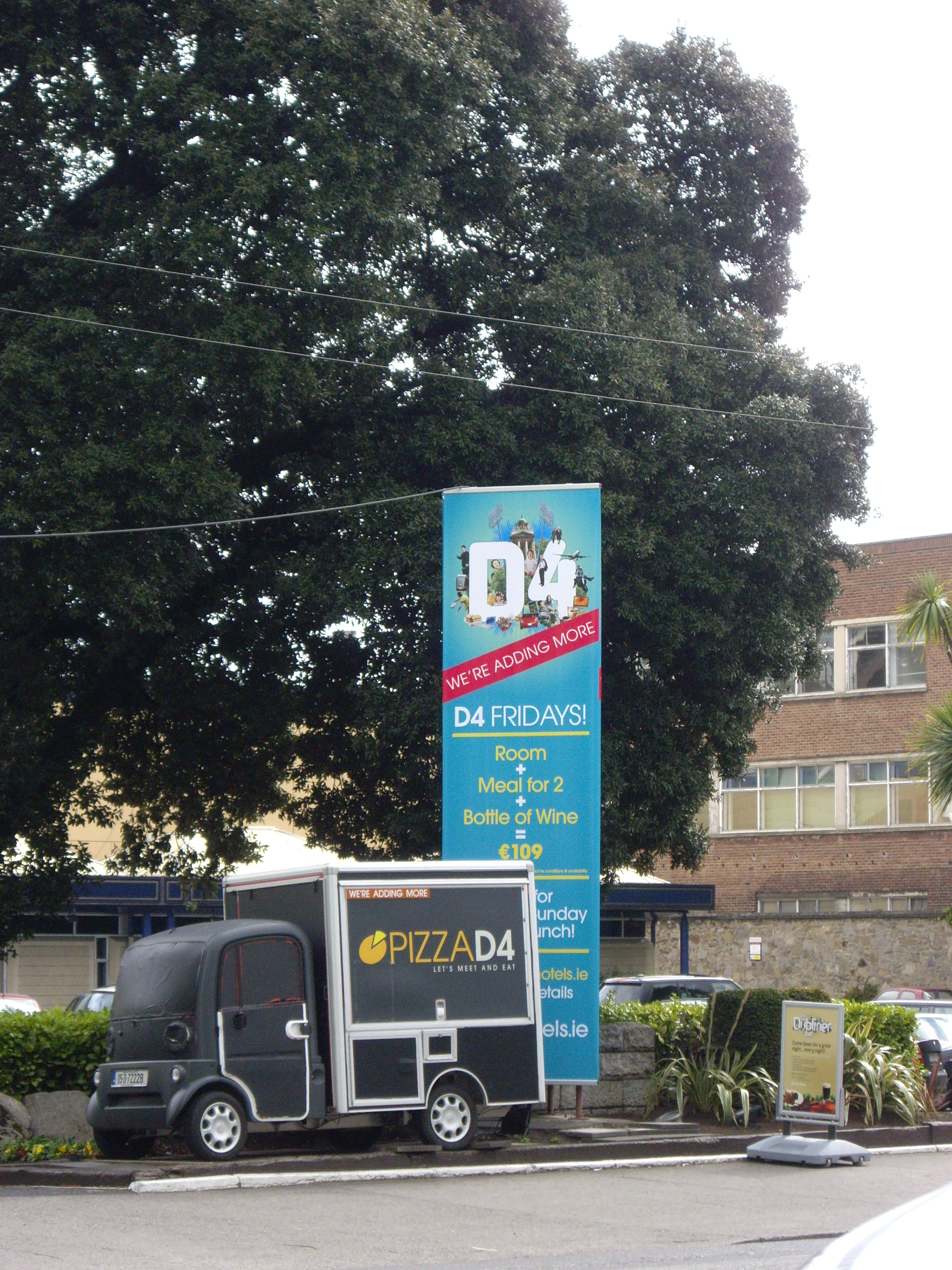
D4 Hotels

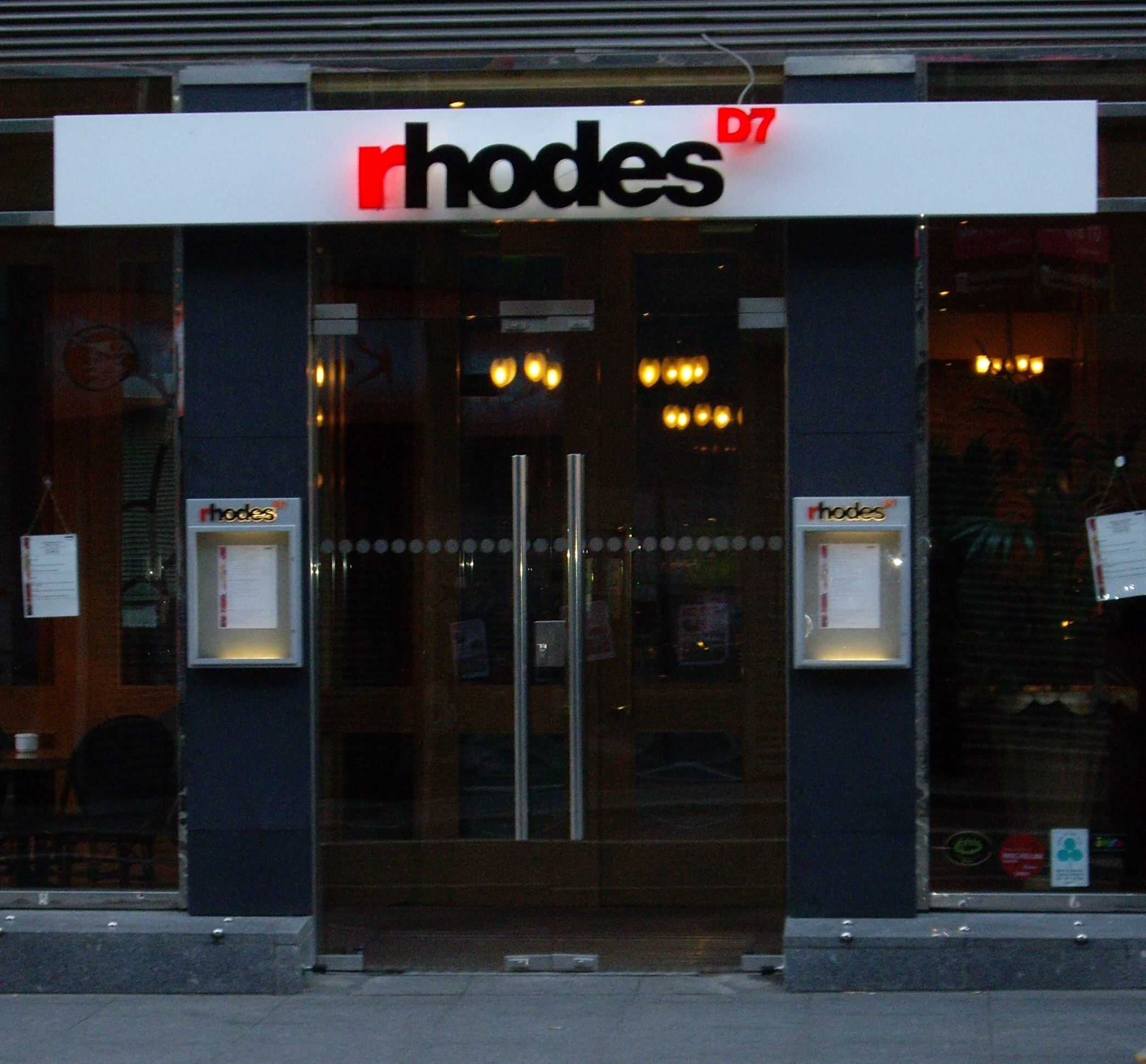
Rhodes D7 restaurant

== See also ==
- Republic of Ireland postal addresses
- List of Eircode routing areas in Ireland
- List of postal codes
