= Knocklyon =

Outer suburb of Dublin, Ireland

Knocklyon Cnoc Lín (Irish)
- Suburb
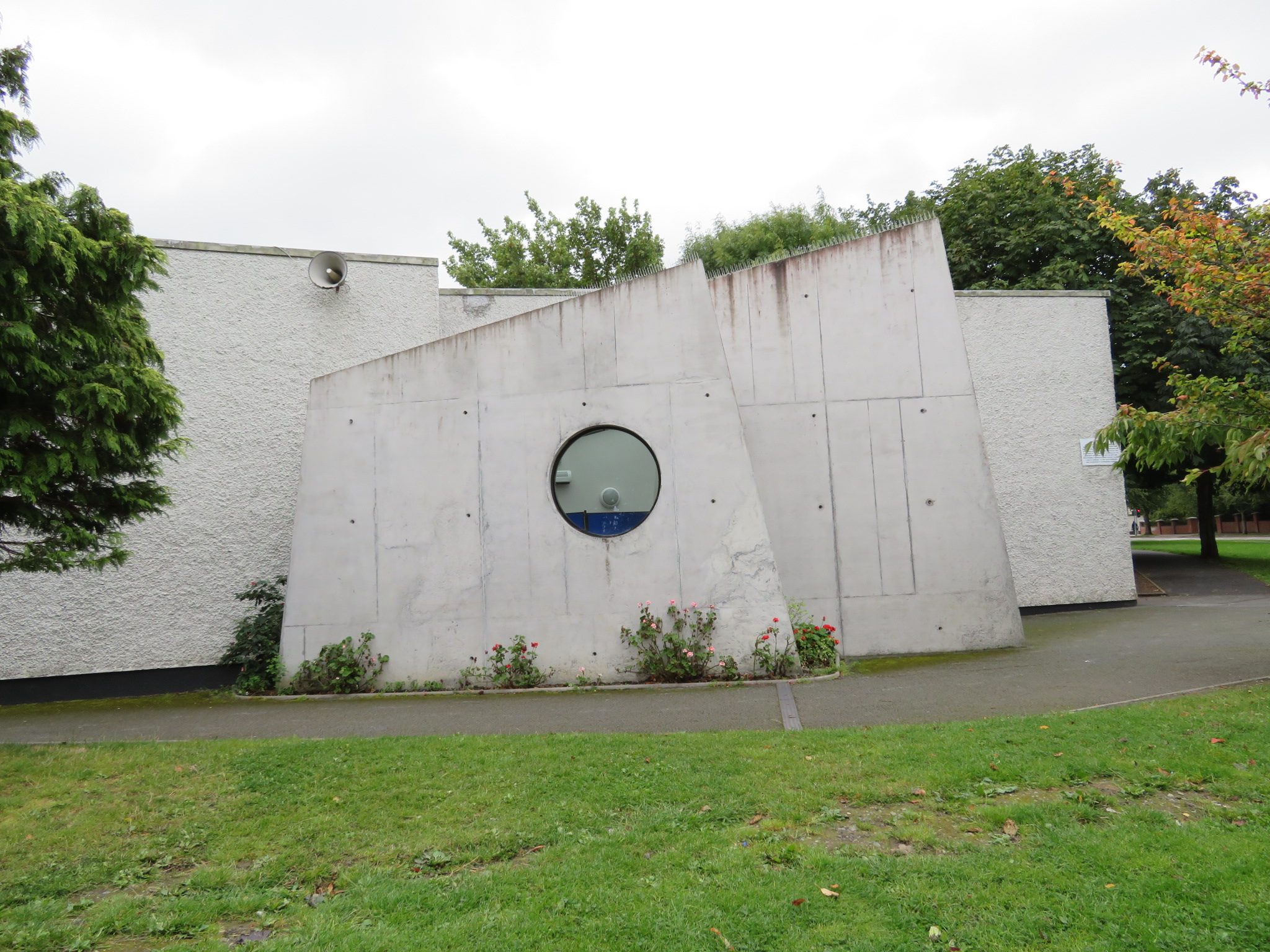
- Knocklyon parish church

- Location in Dublin Knocklyon (Dublin)
- Coordinates: 53.2856°N 6.3205°W
- Country: Ireland
- Province: Leinster
- County: County Dublin
- Local authority: South Dublin County Council

Government
  - Dáil constituency: Dublin South-West
  - EU Parliament: Dublin
  - Local electoral area: Firhouse—Bohernabreena
- Elevation: 69 m (226 ft)
- Time zone: UTC+0 (WET)
  - Summer (DST): UTC-1 (IST (WEST))
- Eircode routing key: D16

Knocklyon (Irish: Cnoc Lín) is an outer suburb of Dublin, Ireland. Unlike many Dublin suburbs, Knocklyon was not developed around a village; rather it largely consists of modern housing, with a number of old cottages and farmhouses along Knocklyon Road attesting to the area's rural past. It is within the administrative area of South Dublin County Council.

== Etymology ==
The area has been known historically in 14th-century scrolls as Cnoclín, literally 'flax mountain'. Until recently, roadsigns in Knocklyon had an incorrect "reverse anglicised" translation, giving Lyon's hill or Cnoc Liamhna, so for example, the Irish-language wording on signs for Knocklyon Road showed Bóthar Chnoc Liamhna. The local authority have updated their translation based on recommendations from the Irish Placenames Commission.

== Location and housing estates ==
Knocklyon is a suburb on the southwest of Dublin city, in the foothills of the Dublin Mountains and immediately south of the River Dodder. It is bordered to the west by Firhouse and Ballycullen, to the east and south by Rathfarnham and Ballyboden, and to the north, across the River Dodder, by Templeogue.

Knocklyon was divided when the M50 motorway was constructed, with most of the suburb today lying east of the motorway. Housing estates to the east include Idrone, Green Acre Court, Knocklyon Avenue, Beverly, Dargle Wood, Coolamber, Knockcullen, Lansdowne, Delaford, Knockaire in the old Knocklyon townland, whilst Orlagh, Scholarstown Park and Templeroan are within the townland of Scholarstown. To the west of the M50 are estates such as Castlefield, Glenlyon, Dalriada, Glenvara and Woodstown. The western and eastern portions of the suburb are linked by the Firhouse Road, by the motorway flyover at Junction 12 of the M50, and by a foot bridge close to where the Old Knocklyon Road formerly met Ballycullen Road.

== Population ==
The population figure cannot be isolated from published census data as Knocklyon is composed of Firhouse-Knocklyon electoral division (ED) (population 39,602 in 2011), plus fractions of Ballyboden ED (57,085) and Firhouse-Ballycullen ED (77,773), not divided and published distinctly.

== Amenities ==
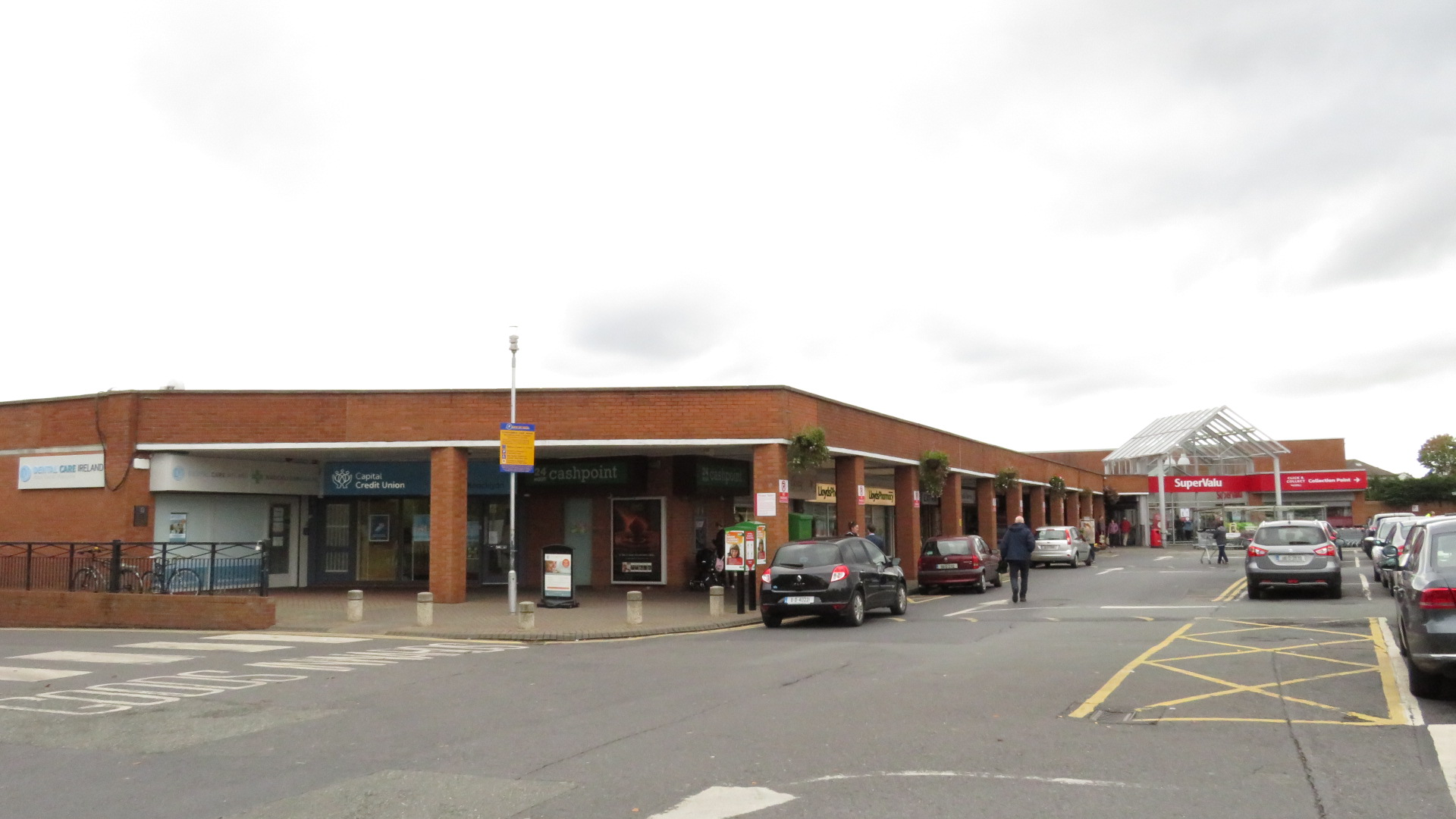
Knocklyon Shopping Centre

Knocklyon Shopping Centre contains a supermarket and other retail outlets. There are also two smaller shopping sites, in the Orlagh and Woodstown estates, each anchored by a convenience store, and with takeaway food shops, beauty salons and other outlets. There is also a local public house.

A division of the voluntary St. John Ambulance was established in 2010, and provides first aid training in the community. The Rutland Centre, a private addiction rehabilitation facility, is located on the Knocklyon Road.

Knocklyon has a number of open spaces within its residential estates and along the River Dodder, including the home ground and playing pitches for both a Gaelic Athletic Association club, Ballyboden St. Enda's GAA, and a soccer club, Knocklyon United Football Club.

As well as the Roman Catholic Iona Centre, which hosts community organisations, there is Knocklyon Community Centre, which is available for sports and social organisations.

=== Schools ===
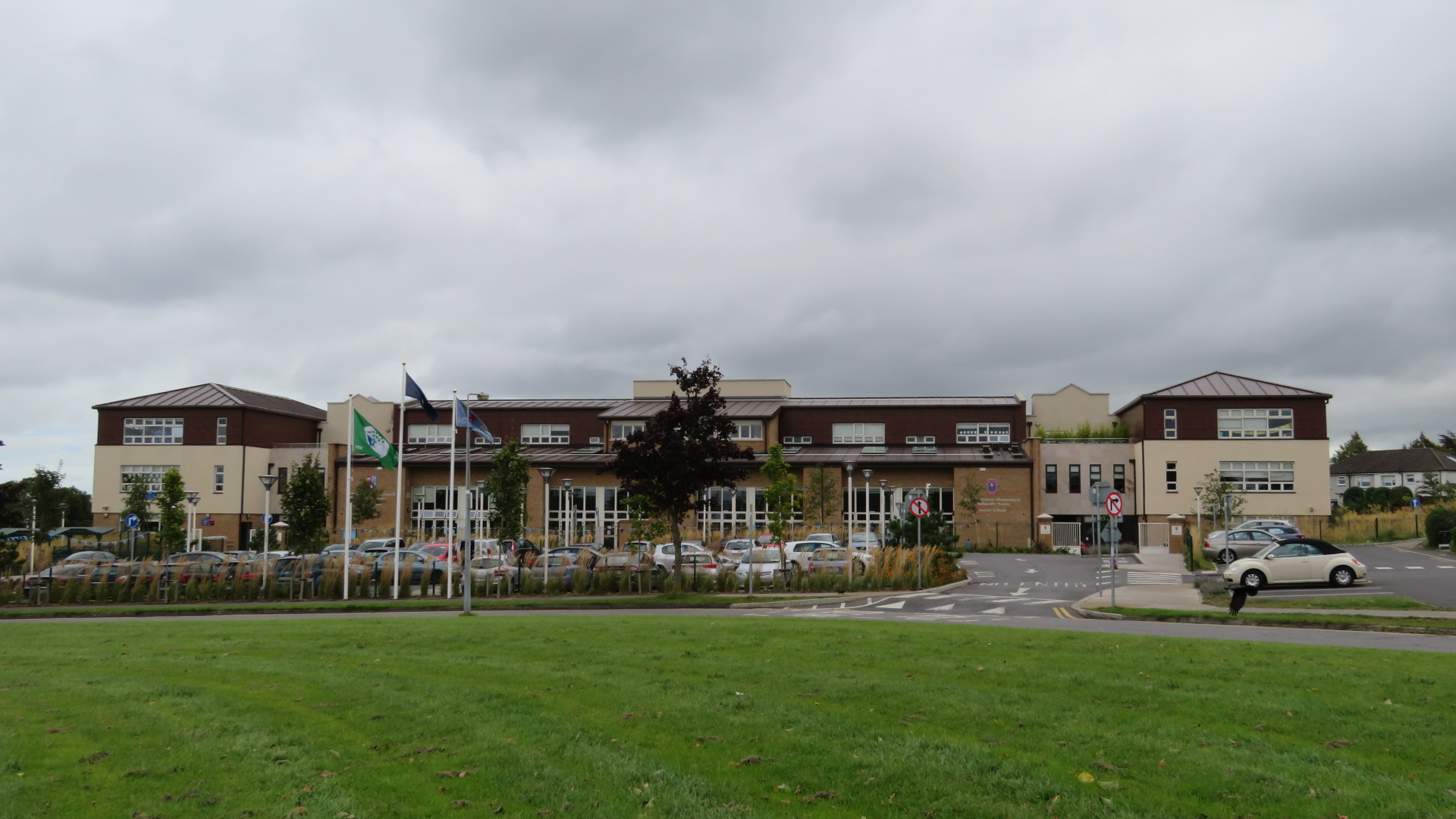
Saint Colmcille's National School

St. Colmcille's national school opened in September 1976. The school is the largest primary school in Ireland and one of the largest primary schools in Europe. It educates 1,600 students and employs 80 teachers, 23 special needs assistants, and 11 ancillary staff. Gaelscoil Chnoc Liamhna is an Irish language primary school that teaches over 200 children. It was established in September 1996 with 36 pupils.

St. Colmcille's Community School (formerly Knocklyon Community School) has around 700 secondary students and opened in September 2000.

== Religion ==
The Catholic Parish of Knocklyon was established in October 1974 under the patronage of Saint Colmcille. It forms part of the Dublin Archdiocese and was delegated by it to the Carmelite Order until 2022, and since 2023, is in the care of the Divine Word Missionaries. The parish church opened in April 1980.

The Iona Pastoral Centre, which opened in 2000, hosts prayer groups and social activities (such as pilates, mother and baby groups, knitting and bridge), as well as a chapter of St Vincent de Paul, AA meetings and GROW Mental Health Movement.

The Catholic parish publishes the Knocklyon News magazine, which has been in continuous publication since 1982 and includes article from the wide and varied community groups of Knocklyon, as well as faith-based content, and news from the parish and the diocese. The Knocklyon News is published three to four times per year, and has a print run of 5,000.

Church of Ireland residents of Knocklyon attend Rathfarnham Parish Church. The Knocklyon Church of Christ is an autonomous Christian congregation with premises on Knocklyon Road, near Gaelscoil Chnoc Liamhna.

== Transport ==
Knocklyon is served by the following Dublin Bus routes: 15, F1, S6 and S8.

== Sport and leisure ==
The Gaelic Athletic Association (GAA) is represented in Knocklyon by Ballyboden St. Enda's GAA Club while association football is organised locally by Knocklyon United F.C. The local Brothers Pearse Athletics Club was founded in 1956. The district is also served by Knocklyon Junior Badminton Club and Knocklyon Social Badminton, which operate from the Knocklyon Community Centre.

A branch of Scouting Ireland and the South Dublin Model Railway Club each operate from their own premises. There is also a brass band and music school, the Knocklyon Concert Band, operating for over 20 years.

Local businesses and community groups are supported and promoted by Knocklyon Network, an active networking organisation.

== Notable people ==
- Chloe Agnew, singer-songwriter, best known for being an original member of Celtic Woman
- Brian Gartland, professional footballer
- Dane Massey, professional footballer
- Enda Minogue, professional footballer
- Andrew Moran, professional footballer and Republic of Ireland international
- Darragh Nugent, professional footballer
- Caitríona Perry, Irish journalist
- Alisha Weir, actress and singer, grew up in Knocklyon
- Brendan Hyland, swimmer from the Tokyo 2020 Olympics
