= List of Eircode routing areas in Ireland =

Postal and delivery service address coding element

A map of Ireland's routing key areas

This list of Eircode routing key areas in Ireland is a tabulation of the routing key areas used by An Post and other mail delivery services for the purposes of directing mail within Ireland. A routing key area "defines a principal post town" according to An Post. There are currently 139 routing key areas in the country. This table does not include the second part of Ireland's seven-character Eircodes, known as the "unique identifier". These are unique to individual addresses and are not street-level identifiers, as is the case in other countries. There are currently 2.2 million of these codes.

== Scope ==
Although Ireland's routing key areas take a similar format to postcode areas in the United Kingdom (including Northern Ireland), they are not intended as a mnemonic for a county or city name, except for those used in the historic Dublin postal districts. Several towns and townlands can share the same routing key. A routing key coupled with a unique identifier looks like this:

EIRCODE
| Routing key | Unique identifier |
| D6W | PV38 |

This corresponds to the unique address of

Terenure Post Office
128 Terenure Road 
Dublin 6 West
D6W PV38

== Eircode routing areas ==
Eircode routing areas of County Dublin. These include Dublin's historic postal districts

Post towns and Eircode routing areas
| Routing key | Post town | Post county |
|---|---|---|
| A92 | Ardee | Louth |
| Y14 | Arklow | Wicklow |
| A84 | Ashbourne | Meath |
| H65 | Athenry | Galway |
| N37 | Athlone | Westmeath |
| R14 | Athy | Kildare |
| K32 | Balbriggan | Dublin |
| F26 | Ballina | Mayo |
| H53 | Ballinasloe | Galway |
| P31 | Ballincollig | Cork |
| F31 | Ballinrobe | Mayo |
| A75 | Ballybay | Monaghan |
| A41 | Ballyboughal | Dublin |
| F35 | Ballyhaunis | Mayo |
| F56 | Ballymote | Sligo |
| P72 | Bandon | Cork |
| P75 | Bantry | Cork |
| H14 | Belturbet | Cavan |
| R42 | Birr | Offaly |
| A94 | Blackrock | Dublin |
| A94 | Booterstown | Dublin |
| F52 | Boyle | Roscommon |
| A98 | Bray | Wicklow |
| V23 | Caherciveen | Kerry |
| E21 | Cahir | Tipperary |
| R93 | Carlow | Carlow |
| A81 | Carrickmacross | Monaghan |
| N41 | Carrick-on-Shannon | Leitrim |
| E32 | Carrick-on-Suir | Tipperary |
| P43 | Carrigaline | Cork |
| E25 | Cashel | Tipperary |
| F23 | Castlebar | Mayo |
| A75 | Castleblayney | Monaghan |
| F45 | Castlerea | Roscommon |
| H12 | Cavan | Cavan |
| P56 | Charleville | Cork |
| F12 | Claremorris | Mayo |
| H71 | Clifden | Galway |
| P85 | Clonakilty | Cork |
| H23 | Clones | Monaghan |
| E91 | Clonmel | Tipperary |
| P24 | Cobh | Cork |
| H16 | Cootehill | Cavan |
| T12 | Cork (centre and southside) | Cork |
| T23 | Cork (northside) | Cork |
| P14 | Crookstown | Cork |
| P32 | Donoughmore | Cork |
| P47 | Dunmanway | Cork |
| T56 | Watergrasshill | Cork |
| T34 | Whitechurch | Cork |
| R56 | Curragh Camp | Kildare |
| A63 | Delgany | Wicklow |
| F94 | Donegal | Donegal |
| A92 | Drogheda | Louth |
| D01 | Dublin 1 | Dublin |
| D02 | Dublin 2 | Dublin |
| D03 | Dublin 3 | Dublin |
| D04 | Dublin 4 | Dublin |
| D05 | Dublin 5 | Dublin |
| D06 | Dublin 6 | Dublin |
| D6W | Dublin 6W | Dublin |
| D07 | Dublin 7 | Dublin |
| D08 | Dublin 8 | Dublin |
| D09 | Dublin 9 | Dublin |
| D10 | Dublin 10 | Dublin |
| D11 | Dublin 11 | Dublin |
| D12 | Dublin 12 | Dublin |
| D13 | Dublin 13 | Dublin |
| D14 | Dublin 14 | Dublin |
| D15 | Dublin 15 | Dublin |
| D16 | Dublin 16 | Dublin |
| D17 | Dublin 17 | Dublin |
| D18 | Dublin 18 | Dublin |
| D20 | Dublin 20 | Dublin |
| D22 | Dublin 22 | Dublin |
| D24 | Dublin 24 | Dublin |
| A86 | Dunboyne | Meath |
| A91 | Dundalk | Louth |
| X35 | Dungarvan | Waterford |
| A85 | Dunshaughlin | Meath |
| R45 | Edenderry | Offaly |
| A83 | Enfield | Meath |
| V95 | Ennis | Clare |
| Y21 | Enniscorthy | Wexford |
| P61 | Fermoy | Cork |
| H91 | Galway | Galway |
| A42 | Garristown | Dublin |
| A96 | Glenageary | Dublin |
| Y25 | Gorey | Wexford |
| A63 | Greystones | Wicklow |
| A82 | Kells | Meath |
| A63 | Kilcoole | Wicklow |
| R51 | Kildare | Kildare |
| R95 | Kilkenny | Kilkenny |
| V93 | Killarney | Kerry |
| X42 | Kilmacthomas | Waterford |
| V35 | Kilmallock | Limerick |
| V15 | Kilrush | Clare |
| A82 | Kingscourt | Cavan |
| P17 | Kinsale | Cork |
| A92 | Laytown-Bettystown-Mornington | Meath |
| F92 | Letterkenny | Donegal |
| F93 | Lifford | Donegal |
| V94 | Limerick | Limerick |
| V31 | Listowel | Kerry |
| T45 | Little Island | Cork |
| N39 | Longford | Longford |
| H62 | Loughrea | Galway |
| K78 | Lucan | Dublin |
| K45 | Lusk | Dublin |
| P12 | Macroom | Cork |
| K36 | Malahide | Dublin |
| P51 | Mallow | Cork |
| W23 | Maynooth | Kildare |
| P25 | Midleton | Cork |
| P67 | Mitchelstown | Cork |
| H18 | Monaghan | Monaghan |
| W34 | Monasterevin | Kildare |
| A94 | Monkstown | Dublin |
| R21 | Muine Bheag | Carlow |
| N91 | Mullingar | Westmeath |
| W91 | Naas | Kildare |
| C15 | Navan | Meath |
| E45 | Nenagh | Tipperary |
| Y34 | New Ross | Wexford |
| W12 | Newbridge | Kildare |
| A63 | Newcastle | Wicklow |
| V42 | Newcastle West | Limerick |
| A63 | Newtownmountkennedy | Wicklow |
| A45 | Oldtown | Dublin |
| R32 | Portlaoise | Laois |
| A67 | Rathnew | Wicklow |
| A85 | Ratoath | Meath |
| F42 | Roscommon | Roscommon |
| E53 | Roscrea | Tipperary |
| K56 | Rush | Dublin |
| V14 | Shannon | Clare |
| K34 | Skerries | Dublin |
| P81 | Skibbereen | Cork |
| F91 | Sligo | Sligo |
| A83 | Summerhill | Meath |
| K67 | Swords and Dublin Airport | Dublin |
| E41 | Thurles | Tipperary |
| E34 | Tipperary | Tipperary |
| V92 | Tralee | Kerry |
| H54 | Tuam | Galway |
| R35 | Tullamore | Offaly |
| A82 | Virginia | Cavan |
| X91 | Waterford | Waterford |
| F28 | Westport | Mayo |
| Y35 | Wexford | Wexford |
| A67 | Wicklow | Wicklow |
| P36 | Youghal | Cork |

== See also ==
- Postal addresses in the Republic of Ireland
- List of Dublin postal districts
- List of postal codes
