= Ballycullen =

Townland in Dublin, Ireland

Ballycullen Baile Uí Chuilinn (Irish)
- Townland
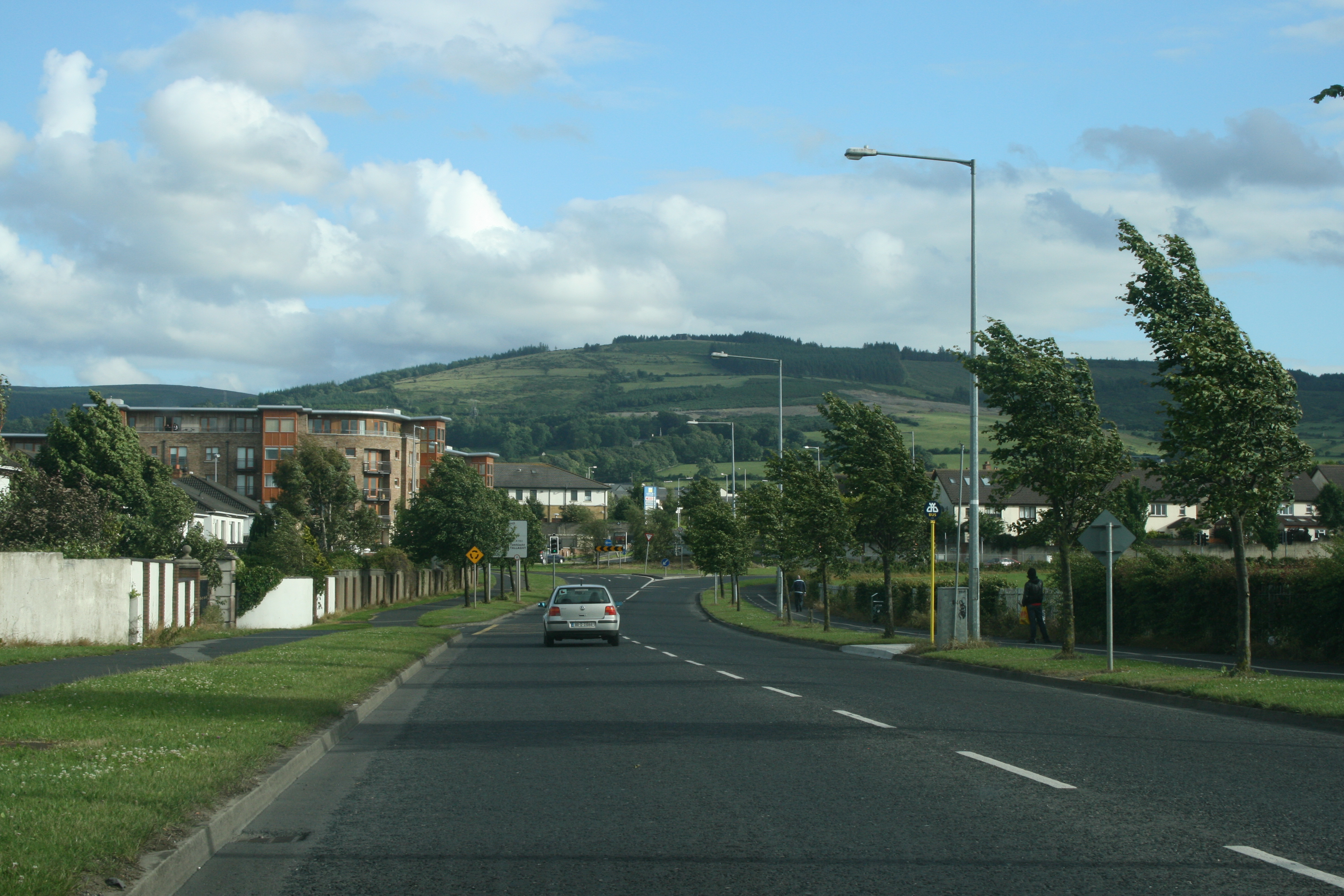
- Ballycullen Road

- Location in Dublin
- Coordinates: 53°16′23″N 6°19′37″W
- Country: Ireland
- Province: Leinster
- County: County Dublin
- Local authority: South Dublin County Council
- Elevation: 125 m (410 ft)
- Eircode routing key: D16, D24

Ballycullen (Irish: Baile Uí Chuilinn) is a townland and suburb of Dublin, Ireland. Ballycullen townland, which has an area of approximately 0.45 km^{2} (0.17 sq mi), is in the civil parish of Tallaght. Situated within the electoral division of Firhouse-Ballycullen, the townland had a population of 2,226 people as of the 2011 census. The Ballycullen Road area is served by several Dublin Bus routes.
