= Postal addresses in the Republic of Ireland =

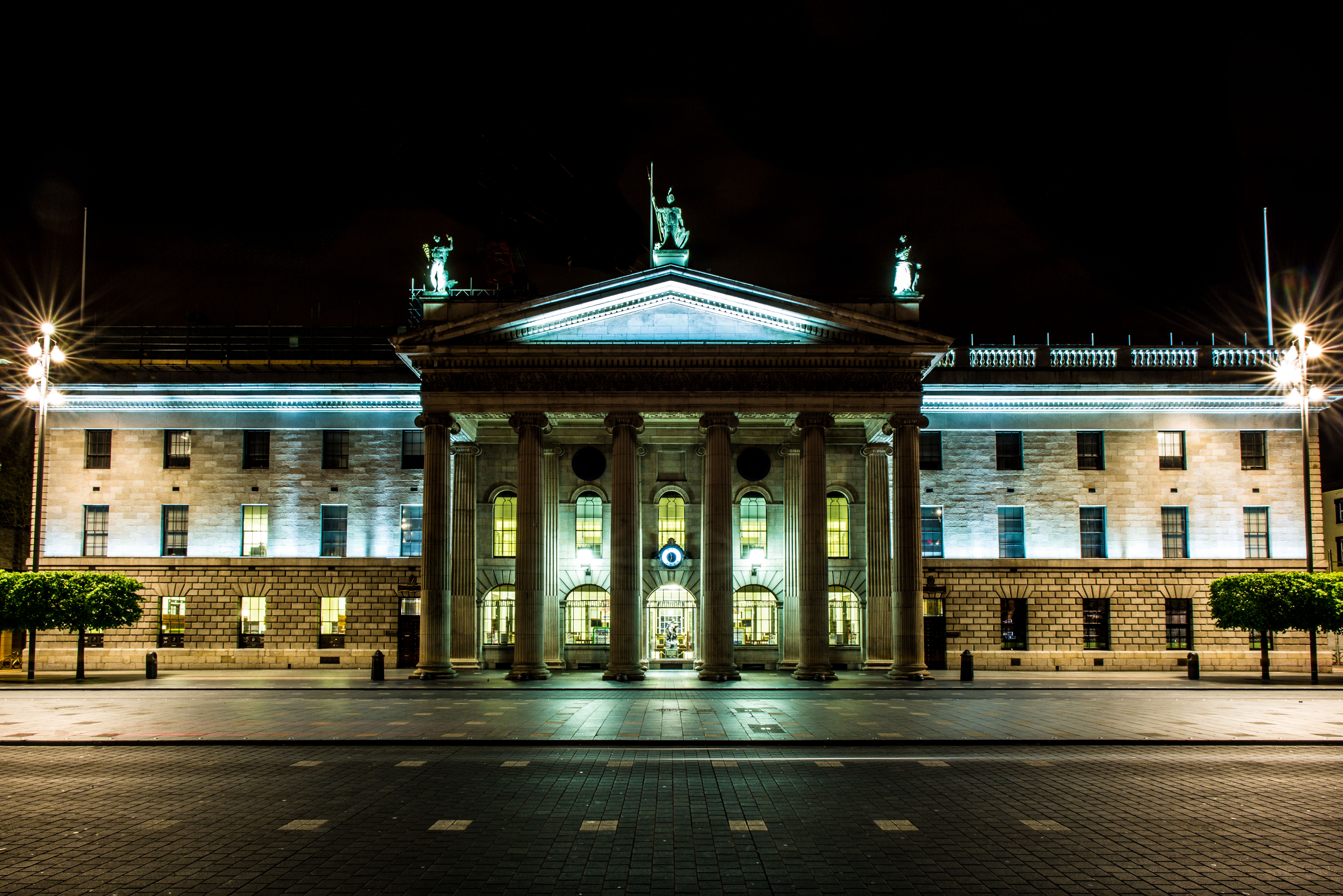
General Post Office, Dublin Eircode: D01 F5P2

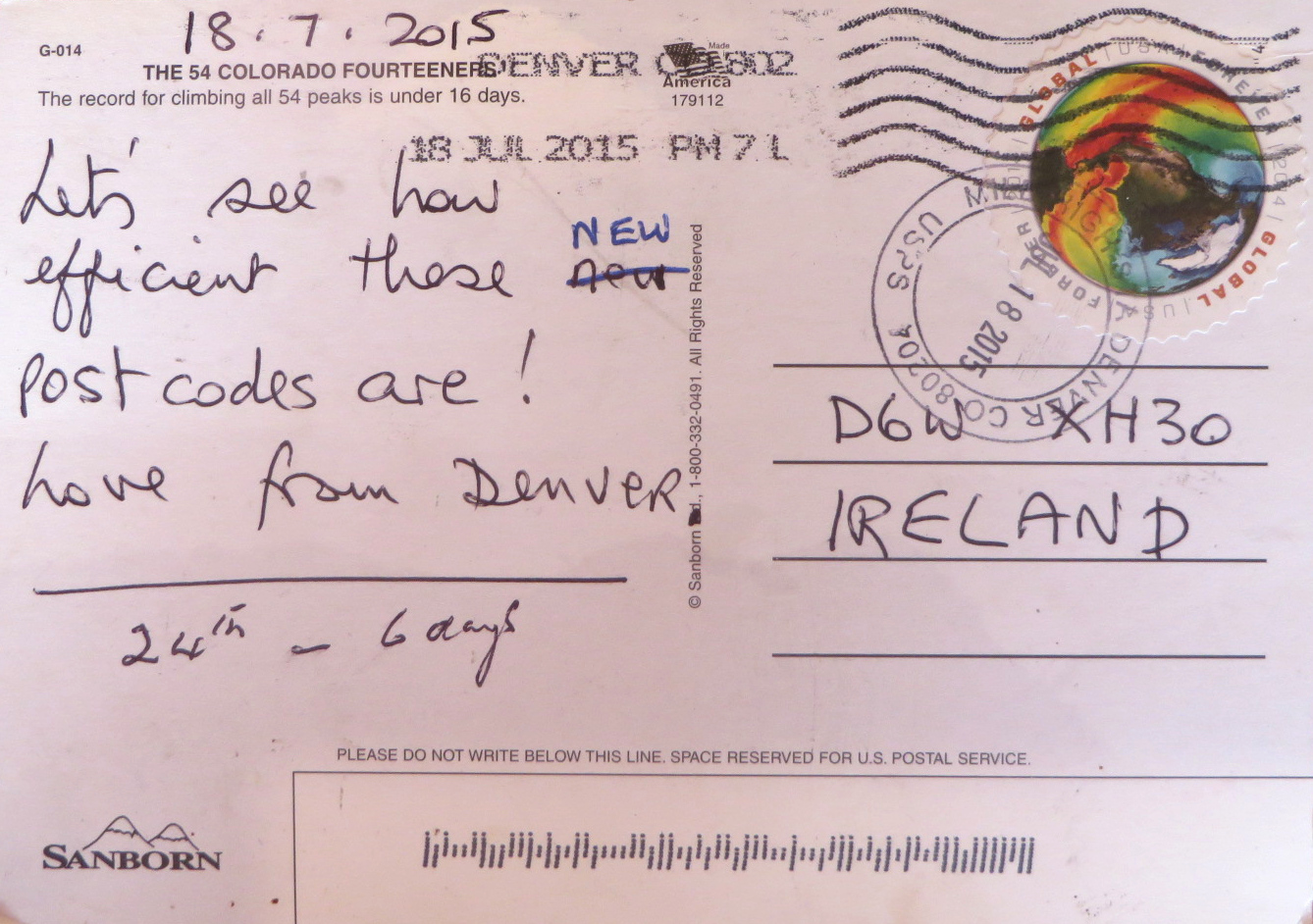
Postcard sent from the United States to a home in Ireland. No addressee name, street address, or town was provided but the card was correctly delivered days later because each Irish address has a unique Eircode

A postal address in Ireland is a place of delivery defined by Irish Standard (IS) EN 14142-1:2011 ("Postal services. Address databases") and serviced by the universal service provider, An Post. Its addressing guides comply with the guidelines of the Universal Postal Union (UPU), the United Nations-affiliated body responsible for promoting standards in the postal industry, across the world.

In Ireland, 35% of premises (over 600,000) have non-unique addresses due to an absence of house numbers or names. Before the introduction of a national postcode system (Eircode) in 2015, this required postal workers to remember which family names corresponded to which house in smaller towns, and many townlands. As of 2021, An Post encourages customers to use Eircode because it ensures that their post person can pinpoint the exact location.

Ireland was the last country in the OECD to create a postcode system. In July 2015 all 2.2 million residential and business addresses in Ireland received a letter notifying them of the new Eircode for their address. Unlike other countries, where postcodes define clusters or groups of addresses, an Eircode identifies an individual address and shows exactly where it is located. The system was criticised at its launch.

Responsibility for the current postal delivery system rests with An Post, a semi-state body; however, the Department of Communications, Energy and Natural Resources (DCENR) retains the right to regulate addresses if they wish so.

== Pre-Eircode postal districts ==
=== Dublin ===
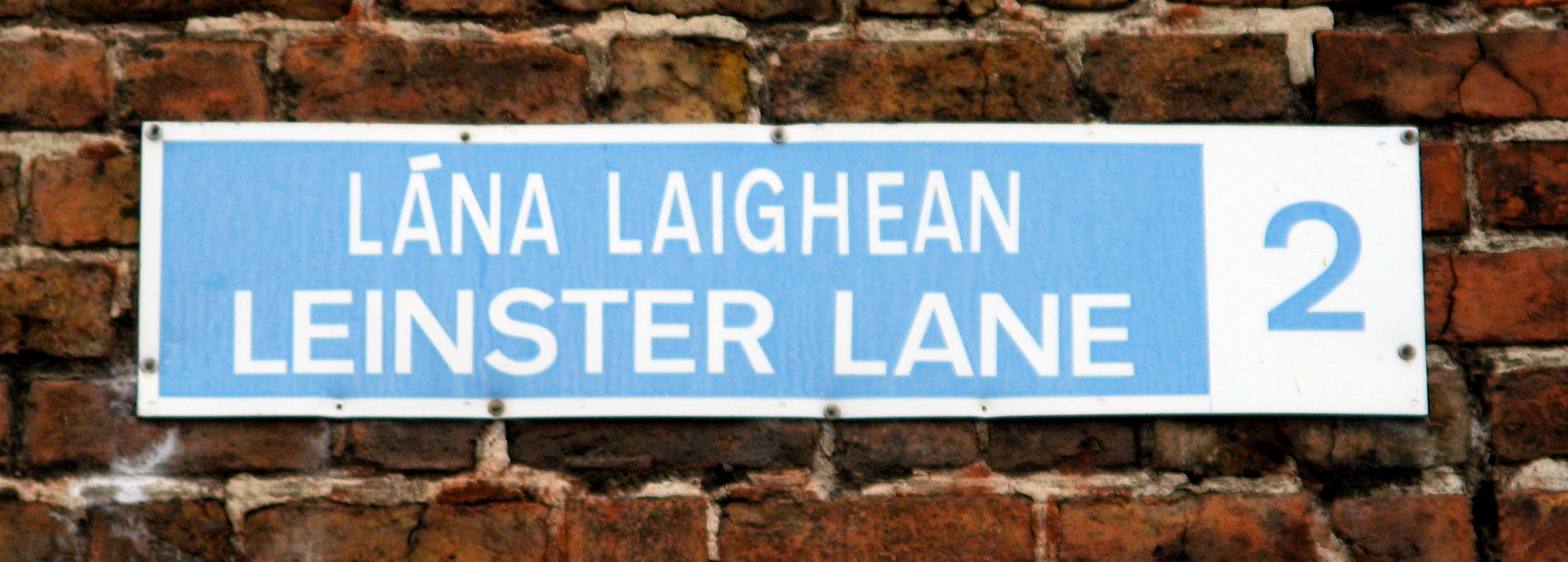
Post-1961 Dublin street sign displaying the street name in Irish and English, with postal district number

In Dublin city and its suburbs, a system of postal districts was introduced in 1917 by the Royal Mail with the prefix "D", and retained after Ireland became an independent country, without the prefix. However the use of district numbers by the public did not begin until 1961, when street signs displayed postal district numbers. Prior to that time, street signs only displayed the street name in Irish and English.

The Dublin system had 22 districts – Dublin 1, 2, 3, 4, 5, 6, 6W, 7, 8, 9, 10, 11, 12, 13, 14, 15, 16, 17, 18, 20, 22, 24. These were incorporated into the routing keys used by the Eircode national postcode system as D01, D02, D12, D22, etc.

=== Cork ===
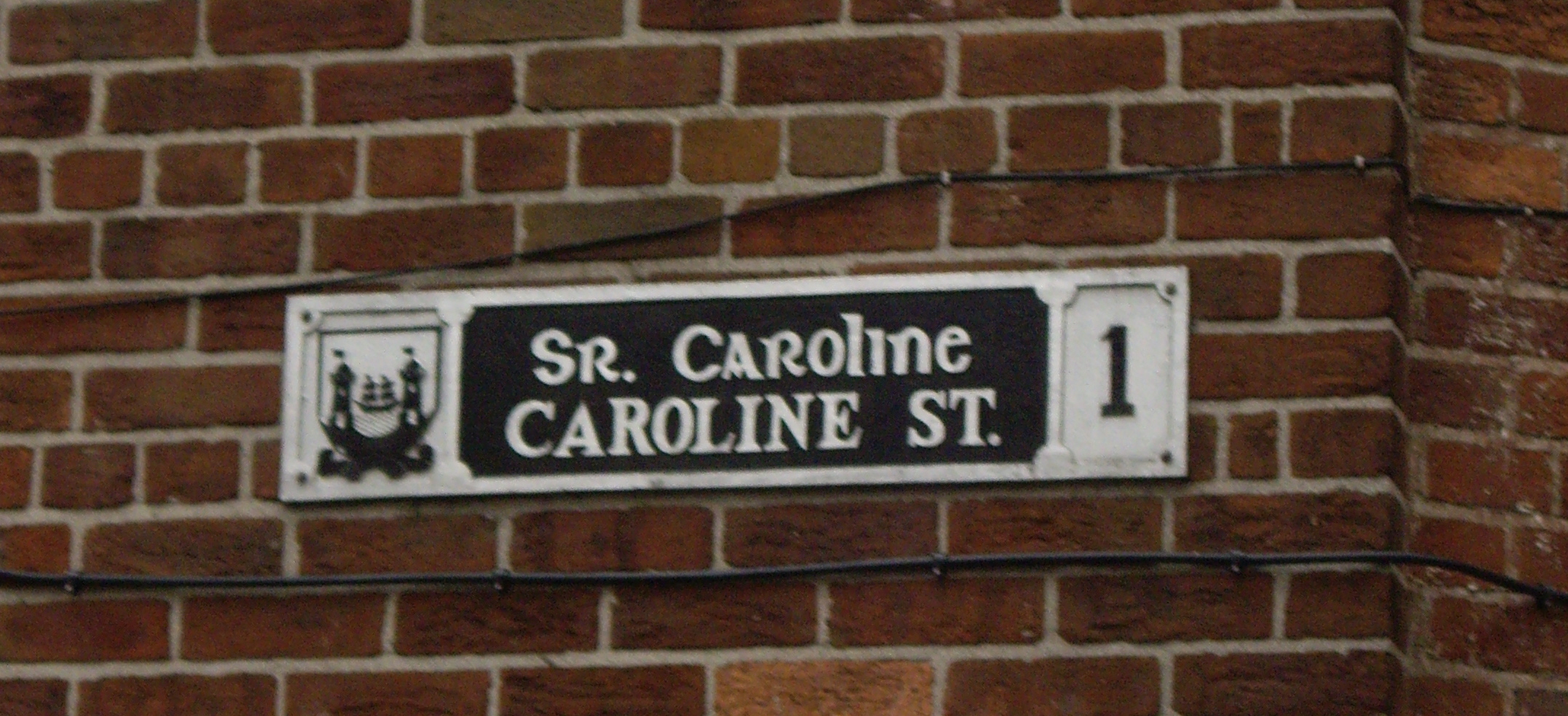
Caroline St. is in Cork 1

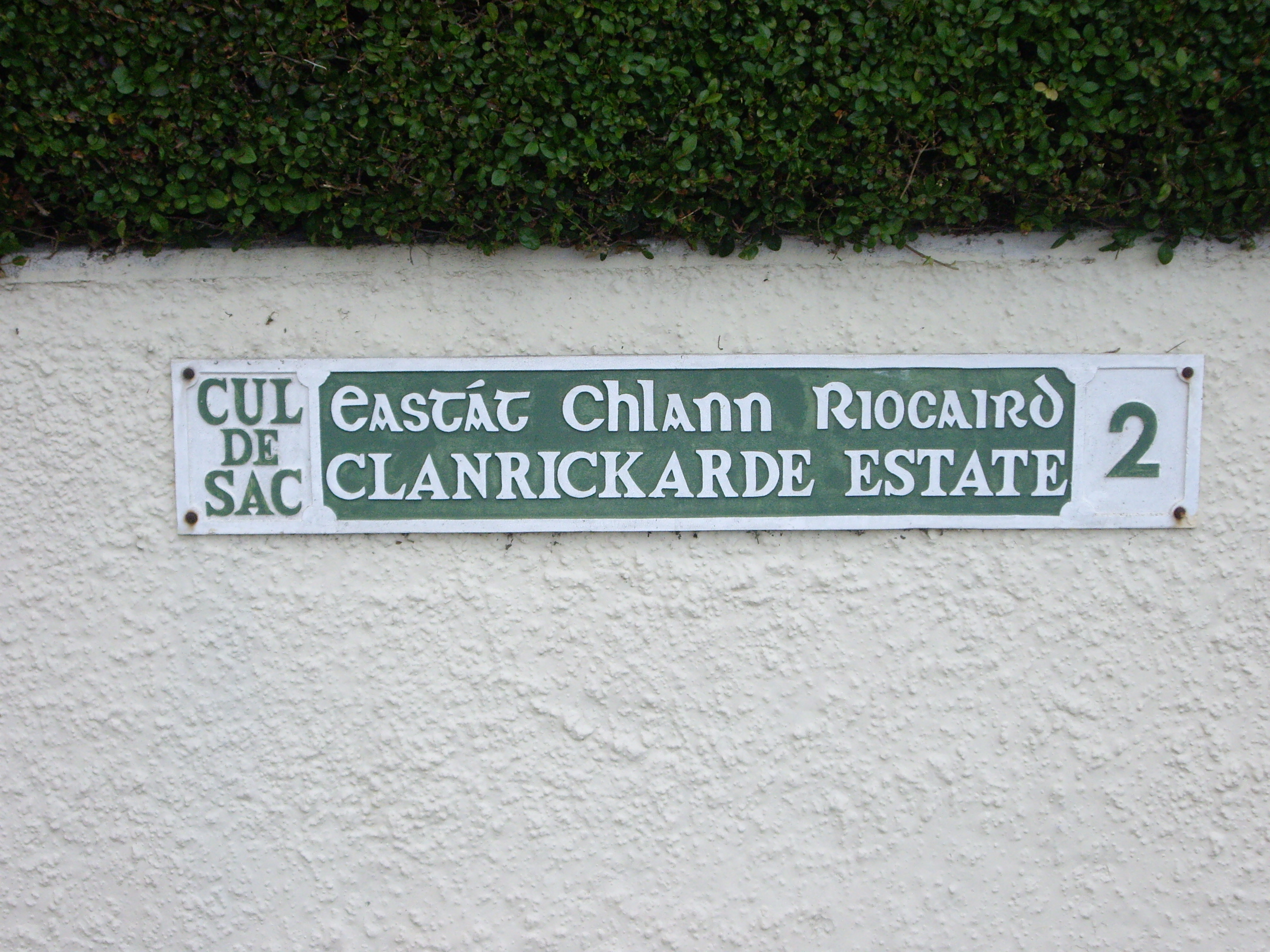
Clanrickarde Estate is in Cork 2

The city of Cork had four numbered postal districts, but these were used internally by An Post and rarely on mail. Cork 1 covered the city centre and large parts of the surrounding city, so, for example, the "Patrick Street" (Sráid Phádraig) sign displays the digit '1'. Cork 2, administered from the Ballinlough sorting office, covered the south-east, Cork 3 (from Gurranabraher) covered the north-west while Cork 4 (from Togher sorting office) covered the south-west. The numbers are not used in the Eircode system, with routing keys in the Cork area instead beginning with the letter 'T'.

== Eircode ==
The launch of a national postcode system called Eircode (Irish: éirchód) began on 28 April 2014. The system incorporates the existing numbered Dublin postal districts as part of the routing key. Eircode provides a unique postcode for each address. These codes are proprietary. Eircode has sole rights to provide access to this database, and does so only under commercial terms. Citizens and civic organisations are legally prevented from building and sharing freely accessible versions of this data.

The codes, known as Eircodes, consist of seven characters. The first three characters, called the routing key, are designed to benefit the postal and logistics industry and contain on average 15,000 addresses each. The Routing Key is used to help sort mail; it is the principal post town of the address as defined by An Post. The second part of the Eircode, called the unique identifier, consists of four characters drawn from a set of randomised letters and numbers that identify each individual address. They are stored in a central database, Eircode Address Database (ECAD), along with other useful geographic information including addresses, variants/aliases, and geo-coordinates of each address point. Sample product data and pricing details were issued to businesses in March 2015. The ECAD is now available to license by end-users and value-added resellers called Eircode Providers.

An example of a typical Irish address is that of the Lord Mayor of Dublin: The Eircode is added on as an extra line to the existing address and postal district code which remains unchanged.

Dublin City Council
Lord Mayor's Office
Mansion House
Dawson Street
Dublin 2
D02 AF30

Unlike other postcode systems, Eircode is not used for PO Box addresses.

=== Background ===
An Post did not introduce automated sorting machines until the 1990s. By then, the optical character recognition (OCR) systems were advanced enough to read whole addresses, as opposed to just postcodes, thereby allowing An Post to skip a generation. Consequently, mail to addresses in the rest of the state did not require any digits after the address.

While An Post stated that the addressing system and sorting technologies make postcodes for mail delivery unnecessary, it was suggested that other services (such as advertising mail providers) would benefit from a national system. After considerable delays, it was announced on 8 October 2013 that codes would be introduced by early 2015. A ten-year contract to introduce and implement the postcode system was awarded to Capita Business Support Services Ireland in January 2014 with support from BearingPoint, Autoaddress, and Strand Communications.

=== Introduction of a national system ===
In 2005, it became the policy of the government of Ireland to introduce a national scheme of postcodes. In May 2005, Noel Dempsey, Minister for Communications, Marine and Natural Resources, announced that postcodes would be introduced by 1 January 2008. In his 2005 book, The Pope's Children, economist David McWilliams hypothesised that the reason post codes were being introduced in Ireland was to prevent political canvassers from getting lost within housing estates:

In the last election, there were reports of canvassers getting lost in the new estates, not being able to pin down issues and having no idea of who was who (...) A cynic might argue that this is the reason for the move now to post codes. The political marketers realise that if they are to win the suburbs they have to start by knowing who lives where exactly, and the quickest and most definitive way of doing this is via post codes.

Noel Dempsey's successor as minister, Eamon Ryan, announced in August 2007 that he was delaying the project pending additional consultation and investigation into the need. On 24 February 2008, The Sunday Times reported that Ryan was finalising the system and hoped to bring the plans to cabinet before the summer of 2008, for introduction in 2009.

An Post was quoted as saying "it would be at the heart of the introduction" and the report of PA Consultants indicated that An Post should be paid over €27 million for its involvement.

Following further delays, in September 2009, the cabinet agreed to go ahead with the project. It was to be put out to tender with the end of 2011 given as the date by which postcodes should be assigned. In January 2010, Minister Ryan stated in the Dáil that the exact nature of the code would not be decided until the implementation tender process had been completed but that a Location Code with GPS coordinates should be part of the system implemented. On 29 January 2010, a tender was issued to select consultants to assist the Minister for Communications in deciding on the way forward.

The project was again delayed, but in December 2010, the government agreed to seek tenders for procurement of national postcodes, with an estimated cost of €15 million, with the contract to be awarded in the summer of 2011, with the codes introduced by the end of that year.

On 29 June 2013, The Irish Times reported that the Minister for Communications, Energy and Natural Resources, Pat Rabbitte, was to bring details to the cabinet meeting of 2 July. According to the report, a postcode operator was to be appointed by September 2013 and every householder and business was to be issued a code by July 2014. Following a cabinet meeting on 8 October 2013, Rabbitte announced that a unique seven-character code would be assigned to every postal delivery point ("letterbox") in the state. A consortium led by Capita Ireland was awarded the tender to develop, implement and operate the system, costing €27 million.

==== Language concerns ====
Conradh na Gaeilge, an organisation advocating use of the Irish language, expressed concern over postcodes or postal abbreviations being based solely on English language place names, for example D for Dublin (Baile Átha Cliath in Irish) or WX for Wexford (Loch Garman in Irish) as is the case with vehicle registration plates. It had advocated that postcodes should either consist solely of numbers, as in many other bilingual or multilingual countries, or be based on Irish language names instead. These concerns were addressed upon the introduction of Eircode. Apart from routing keys corresponding to the previous Dublin postal districts, the initial letters of Eircode routing keys bear no relation to either the English language or Irish language place names within these areas. However, they do incorporate the letters K, V, W, X, Y which are not used in Irish orthography apart from a small number of loanwords.

=== Preparation for a postcode ===
In the light of the liberalisation of postal services and the end of An Post's monopoly, ComReg, the Communications Regulator in Ireland, began considering the introduction of postcodes. A Postcode Working Group met in early 2005 and produced a report recommending the implementation of a postcode system.

On 23 May 2005, the Minister for Communications, Marine and Natural Resources, Noel Dempsey, in a government press release announced that postcodes would be introduced in Ireland by 1 January 2008. In November 2005, the National Statistics Board issued a report welcoming the decision and making recommendations as to its implementation. They supported a point-based postcode system that used grid reference/GPS technology to provide a relatively clear-cut, low cost approach to allocating a postcode to an address. This avoids trying to group households together into small area clusters. It was later announced that the postcodes would include the one- or two-character county codes currently used in vehicle registration plates, making them alphanumeric, with the existing Dublin system retained.

In June 2007, a brief to the new Minister for Communications, Eamon Ryan, stated that a memo was submitted by the Department of Communications to the Irish Government in May 2007 seeking approval for the implementation of the postcode system. It also stated that the decision arising from this submission was that the Minister would revert to Government following further analysis to quantify the benefits, which would then be followed by a public consultation process. In August 2007, the Minister reportedly postponed the implementation of the system "indefinitely" pending additional public consultation.

On 18 October 2007 Eamon Ryan announced at ComReg's "Postal Services in the 21st Century" conference that "[Post] codes should be introduced as a matter of priority". The introduction was stated to be subject to cabinet approval. On 25 February 2008 the Irish Independent reported that the proposals were being presented to the Cabinet with a view to full national implementation before summer 2008. It stated that Eamon Ryan was finalising the proposals, which include a 6 character format postcode, giving a sample of D04 123 where D04 corresponded to the current Dublin 4 postal region and 123 was a specific group of buildings. similar to British and Dutch postcodes, which cover groups of buildings, rather than simply suburbs or towns.

On 7 December 2008, the Sunday Business Post reported results of an independent report by PA Consulting for the department indicating that benefits of up to €22m could be achieved for public bodies through the introduction of a postcode. The PA report indicated that postcodes had greater uses beyond the delivery of mail or simple navigation services, citing the "need for efficient database based on postcodes reducing inefficient service delivery and infrastructural planning". It said that Postcodes are considered critical for "efficient spatial planning and aiding health research, education, housing social care and employment integration". Increased efficiencies for businesses would emerge; in particular, the insurance sector stated that "it would result in annual savings of around €40 million by improving their risk management assessments."

The article concluded saying that annual maintenance costs for a postcode management licence holder which would include maintaining the necessary database of buildings are estimated "at about €2.5 million" but the minister was reported as saying that "ongoing costs would be covered by income generated by the eventual licence holder".

In September 2009, Minister Ryan said that an alphanumeric system would be introduced in 2011 at a fraction of the previous estimate of €50 million. This was reiterated a month later in a Seanad debate, in spite of claims to the contrary by the Communication Workers Union. Liz McManus, opposition spokeswoman for communications in the Labour Party, called for the plan to be revoked due to job losses in An Post, the projected costs and fears of junk mail.

In January 2010, Simon Coveney challenged Ryan in the Dáil on the apparent rejection of a GPS-based postcode system and argued that a system that pinpointed 20–50 houses would be only a slight improvement. Ryan disputed Coveney's remarks, saying that he fully supported a postcode system that had geo-coordinates at its centre, and that the system chosen would depend on the tenders received.

The tender process to select consultants was announced on 1 February 2010, with a view to having the postcode system operational by the end of 2011.

In April 2010, the Oireachtas committee on Communications, Energy and Natural Resources published a report criticising some of the proposals listed above, recommending instead that any postcode implemented must be capable of supporting "developing technologies such as internet mapping, google maps and iPhones", applying a unique identifier to each property. It suggests that the previously mentioned D04 123 model would not satisfy this requirement and may, in fact, make matters worse.

On 15 April 2010 the tendering process to select a consultant to advise the Minister on the implementation of a postcode was cancelled, due to a serious but unspecified technical error in the tendering documents.

=== Legislation ===
Legislation to "provide for the establishment, operation and maintenance of a system of postcodes" – the Communications Regulation (Postal Services) Bill 2010 – was introduced in November 2010. The bill was enacted in August of the following year, with Part 3 of the act dealing with the establishment of a National Postcode System. Postcodes are defined in the legislation as "a code consisting of numbers or other characters or both numbers and other characters that identifies the locality of an address and, where appropriate, the geographic location of an address". The Minister for Communications, Energy and Natural Resources is empowered to award a contract for "the development, implementation and maintenance of a system... for the allocation, dissemination and management of postcodes for the purposes of, or relating to, the provision of postal services and the use of the national postcode system by other persons for such other purposes as the Minister considers appropriate".

On 29 June 2013, The Irish Times reported that the Minister for Communications, Energy and Natural Resources, Pat Rabbitte, was to bring details to the cabinet meeting of 2 July. According to the report, a postcode operator was to be appointed by September 2013 and every householder and business was to be issued a code by July 2014. Following a cabinet meeting on 8 October 2013 Rabbitte announced that a unique seven-digit would be assigned to every post-box in the state. A consortium led by Capita Ireland had been awarded the tender to develop, implement and operate the system, at a cost of €27 million over a ten-year period. On the Eircode launch day in July 2015, householders and businesses were able to look them up online in advance of receiving a posted notification. The Eircode website received over 1.5 million hits in the first 48 hours.

Each code consists of seven letters and/or digits, with a space after the third character. The first character is always a letter and the second is always a digit. The third character may be either a digit or the letter W, but not any other letter. The remaining four characters may either be letters or digits. The first three characters represent one of 139 geographical district or post-towns. The existing Dublin postal districts form the first three characters (the Routing Key) in the system.

=== Issues ===
==== An Post's position ====
An Post had previously claimed that a nationwide public postcode system was unnecessary, stating that it was "the application of 1960's technology to a 21st century problem", that it would be expensive, and that its existing system was superior. They later became actively involved in implementing the new Eircode system, with their CEO saying they were investing in their four main sorting centres to adopt the new postcode system at a cost of €1m, according to an Irish Times report stating "An Post chief executive Donal Connell said it would work "very closely" with Eircode, the new company set up by Capita to manage the codes, in implementing the national infrastructure. "It will certainly help with the efficiency of our distribution'. Mr Connell said €1 million from An Post’s capital investment fund would be spent to install new software in its four national sorting centres. Courier services and advertising mail companies complained that the absence of such a system put Ireland at a disadvantage compared with other European countries.

An Post had used a system of three-digit sort codes, similar to the Mailsort system used by Royal Mail in the United Kingdom, for pre-sorting mail in bulk. There were two levels, Presort 152, which had 152 codes for large volumes of mail, and Presort 61, which had 61 codes for smaller volumes.

It corresponded to Dublin postal districts: Dublin 1 is 101, etc., except for Dublin 10 and Dublin 20, both of which had the same code 110, and Dublin 6W, which was 126. Cork had codes for four each of the delivery offices, Ballinlough (901), North City (902), Little Island (903), and South City (903).

==== Utility issues ====
The Eircode system has been criticised for using an unsequenced code limited to postal addresses on the grounds that it undermines the system's utility. The cost, procurement methods used, slow rollout and implementation of the system (originally proposed in 2003) were criticised, including in a report by the Comptroller and Auditor General.

==== Adoption ====
A March 2019 survey of homes and businesses commissioned by the Department of Public Expenditure and Reform reported that 30% never quoted the Eircode when giving their address, 32% did so only "occasionally", 22% "frequently", and 12% "always". In contrast, a November 2019 survey for the Department of Communications, Climate Action and Environment claimed "94 per cent of people are using Eircodes", although the last survey data posted by Eircode itself shows usage levels of 74% or less.

== GeoDirectory ==
Established by An Post and the Ordnance Survey of Ireland, the Geodirectory is a database of every building in Ireland. The database contains every postal address, a corresponding geographic address, the electoral division (a grouping of addresses useful for analysis and defining catchment areas of services), a system address reference (not in use by individuals), and the location coordinates. It is available for commercial use and has been used by several commercial companies for various geo-location and data cleansing purposes. It is the source of all addresses in the Eircode ECAD database. It is also used by Google Maps in Ireland to identify and search for building names on mapping. For example, one of the entries in its sample database is Midland Regional Hospital, Portlaoise, building ID 10003105 (at ITM 648555.822, 698833.088).

== See also ==
- List of Eircode routing areas in Ireland
- List of postal codes
- Universal Postal Union
