= Merrion =

Merrion, Merion, or Meirion may refer to:

Places

United States:

- Merion, Pennsylvania
- Merion Village, Columbus, Ohio

Wales:

- Merrion, Pembrokeshire
- Merionethshire
- Meirionnydd

Merrion Estate, Dublin, Ireland:

- Merrion Gates
- Merrion Road
- Merrion Square
- Merrion Street
- Mount Merrion

People

- Meirion, father of Caradog ap Meirion, King of Gwynedd (reigned 754? – 798)
- Mem Fox (Merrion Frances Partridge, b.1946), Australian children's author

Other

- SS Merion, 1902 ocean liner
- Merrion Centre (disambiguation)
- Merion Golf Club, Merion, Pennsylvania
- Merion Cricket Club, Merion, Pennsylvania
- Merrion Cricket Club, Dublin, Ireland

== See also ==
- Merian (disambiguation)
- Meriones (disambiguation)
- Marion (disambiguation)
- Portmeirion, Wales
