= Sandymount =

Coastal suburb of Dublin, Ireland

Sandymount Dumhach Thrá (Irish)
- Suburb
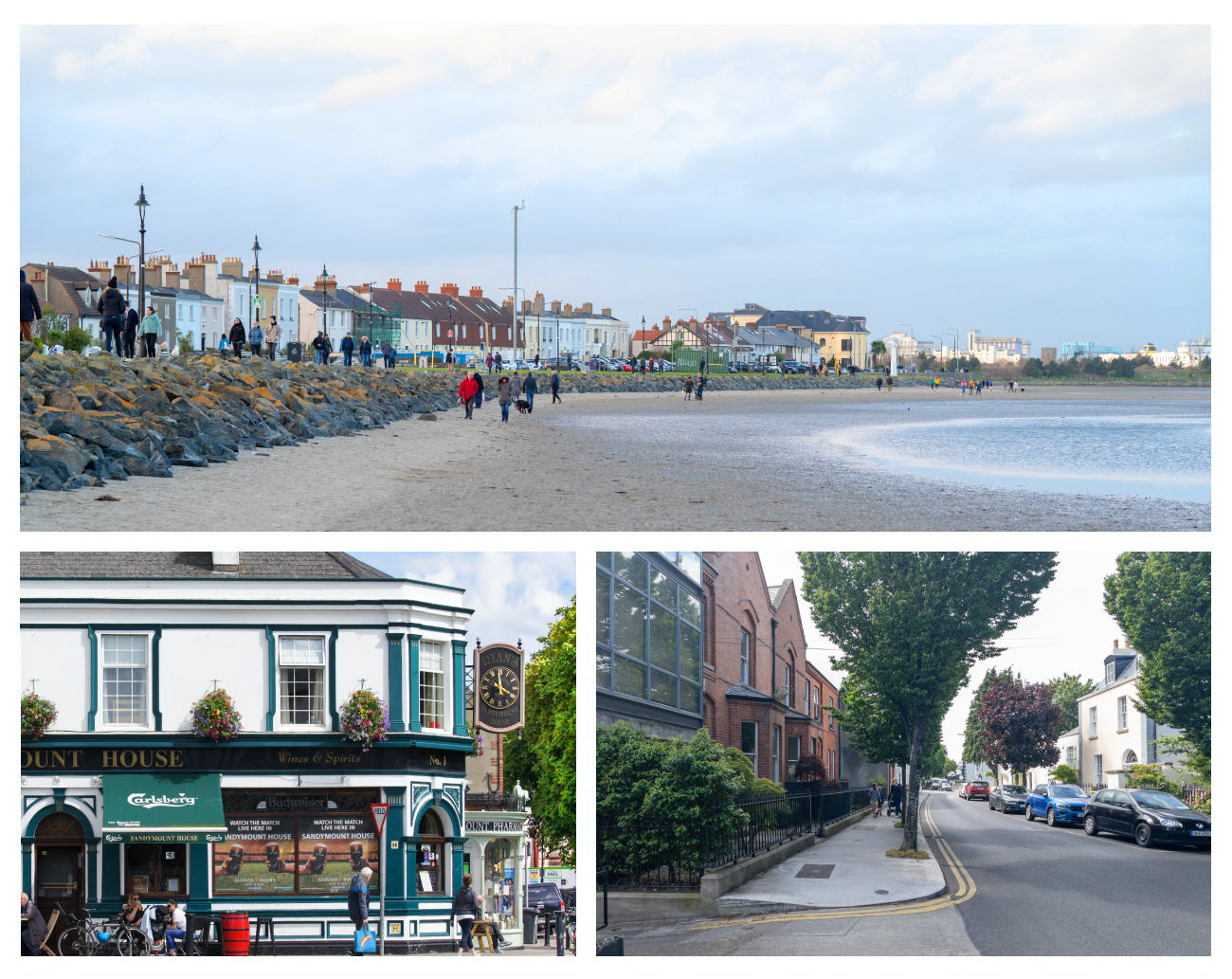
- Clockwise from top: Sandymount Strand; a residential street in Sandymount; Ryan's Sandymount House pub

- Location in Dublin Location in Ireland
- Coordinates: 53°19′50″N 6°12′54″W
- Country: Ireland
- Province: Leinster
- Local authority: Dublin City Council
- Time zone: UTC+0 (WET)
  - Summer (DST): UTC+1 (IST (WEST))
- Eircode routing key: D04
- Area code: 01 (+3531)
- Irish Grid Reference: O190325

Sandymount (Irish: Dumhach Thrá) is a coastal suburb in the Dublin 4 district on the Southside of Dublin in Ireland.

== Etymology ==
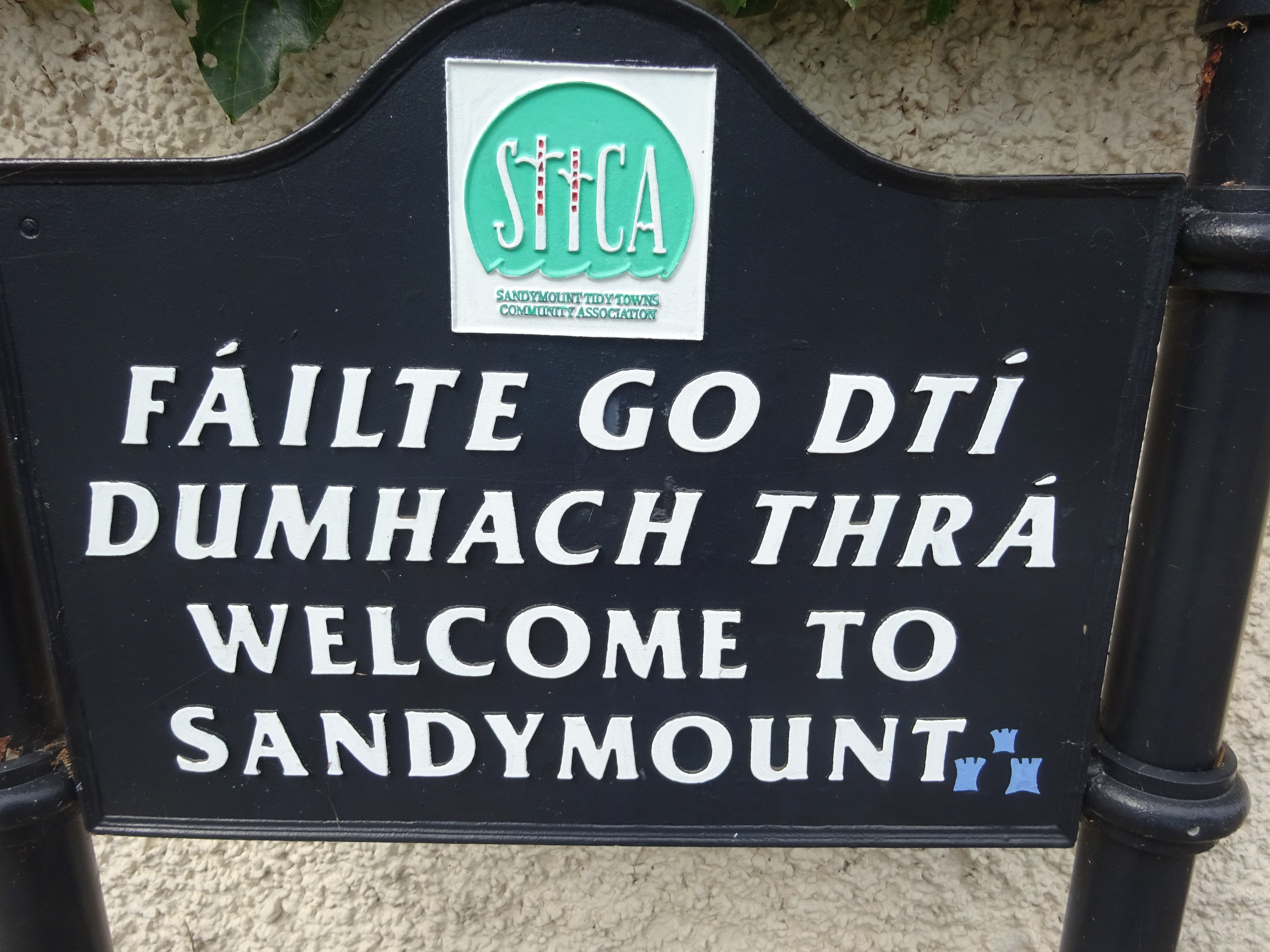
Bilingual welcome sign

An early name for the area was Scal'd Hill or Scald Hill. During the 18th century, there was a village called Brickfield Town on the site of Sandymount Green; this took its name from Lord Merrion's brickfields, which stretched from here to Merrion at the time. The Irish name Dumhach Thrá is more recent than the one in English and approximately translates as sandy ground or sand dune of a beach.

== Geography ==
Sandymount is located between 3 and 4 km south-east of Dublin's city centre. At the northern end, it begins where Newbridge Avenue meets Herbert Road, running to Church Avenue at the coast, west along the DART rail line, and south to Merrion Gates. Sandymount Promenade runs along the coast road (Strand Road) from Sandymount Strand, down to Merrion Gates. It lies a little south of the Great South Wall in Dublin Bay.

The River Dodder passes nearby to the west, and three streams, the Elm Park, Nutley and Trimleston, come to the coast to the south, but any pollution of these affects Sandymount Strand. In the past, the Nutley Stream came to the coast in what is now Sandymount and severe flooding occurred on the old course in 1963.

Neighbouring suburbs are Ballsbridge, Merrion, and Irishtown.

Sandymount is in the local electoral area for elections to Dublin City Council and in the Dáil constituency of Dublin Bay South.

== History ==
Sandymount was once part of the Pembroke Township, which took its name from the fact that this area was part of the estate of the Earl of Pembroke.

=== Martello Tower ===
About halfway along Sandymount strand is the Sandymount Martello tower, part of a system of defences built to warn of an invasion by Napoleon. The tower housed a café in the 1960s. An attempt to turn the tower into a restaurant led to the installation of a large window with roller blinds on the seaward side of the tower. The restaurant never opened, leaving the tower with the modified window, and landscaped exterior abandoned on the strand. It is one of approximately 29 Martello Towers in the Greater Dublin Area and the closest to Dublin City and port.

=== Baths ===
The Merrion Promenade Pier and Baths Company built Sandymount swimming baths in 1883. The baths measured approximately 40 by 40 metres, with a 75-metre pier added in 1884. The pier featured a bandstand halfway along it and summer concerts were regularly held there for many years. By 1920, the pier had deteriorated so much that it had to be demolished. The concrete baths section, which resembles a small harbour out on the sands, remains; the baths still remain in Sandymount but have fallen into disrepair mainly by storm damage.

=== Pubs ===
A popular tavern existed close to Sandymount Green in the eighteenth century named The Conniving House. Opened in 1725, it became famous for its fish and ale and became a popular venue for music in the locality and wider city. Although the verb 'connive' has negative connotations in modern English, at the time of the tavern's establishment it was used to indicate "a subversive indulgence of that which one ought to oppose" as the venue allowed an opportunity for interaction between the 'high' (or elite) musical culture in the city and what was perceived as 'lower' vernacular musical culture. Such was its renown in the mid-eighteenth century, that it was depicted in John Rocque's 1757 map entitled A Survey of the City, Harbour, Bay and Environs of Dublin on the same Scale as those of London, Paris & Rome. The only verbal account of the venue comes from the book the Life of John Buncle, Esq. from 1766 by Thomas Amory, who heard the famous Larry Grogan playing the pipes there while Jack Lattin, "the most agreeable of companions", played "matchlessly" on the fiddle. Other writers of the period, such as Laurence Whyte and Charles Coffey, recorded an energetic native musical culture in the venue.

== Amenities ==
=== Sandymount Green ===
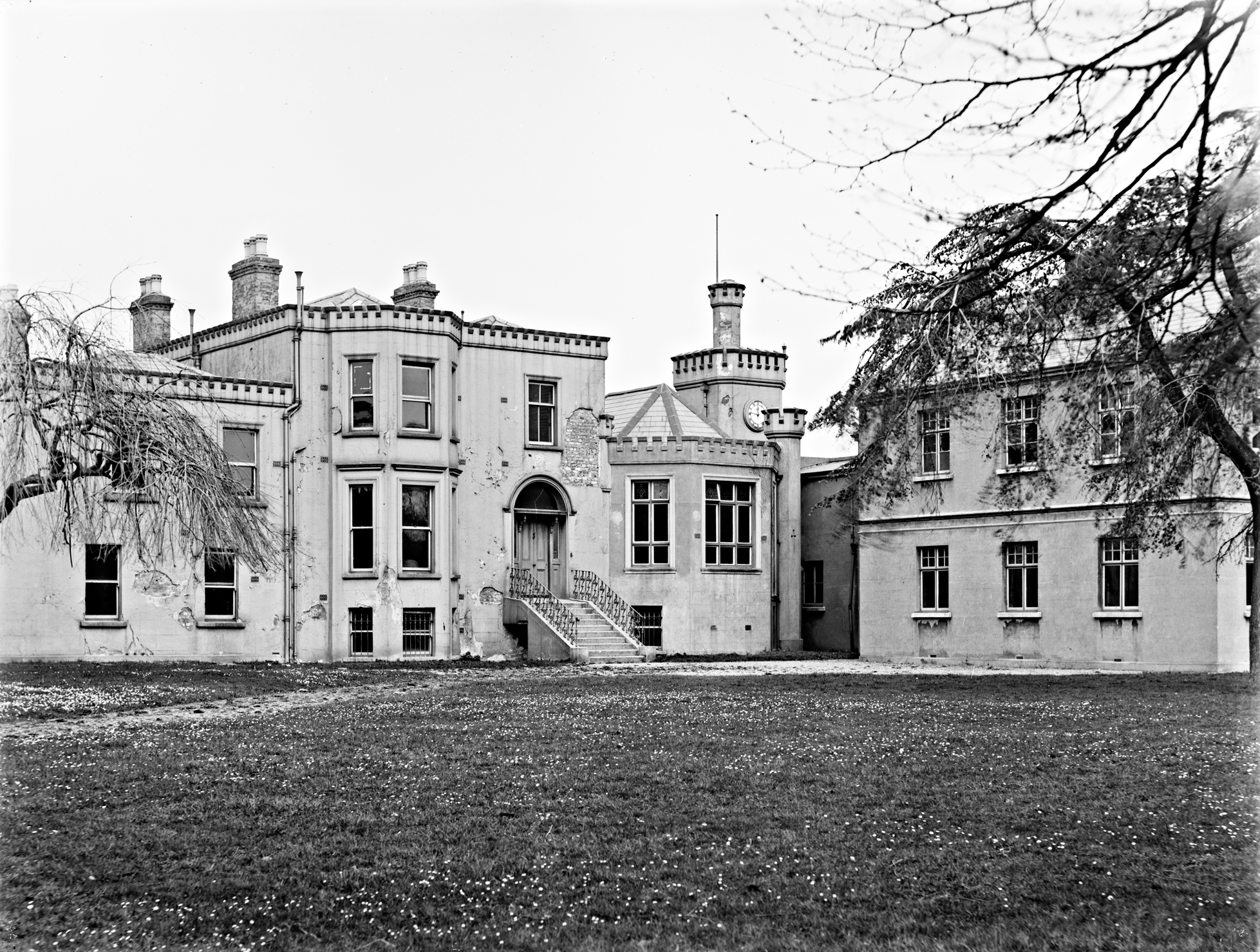
Sandymount Castle, c.1910

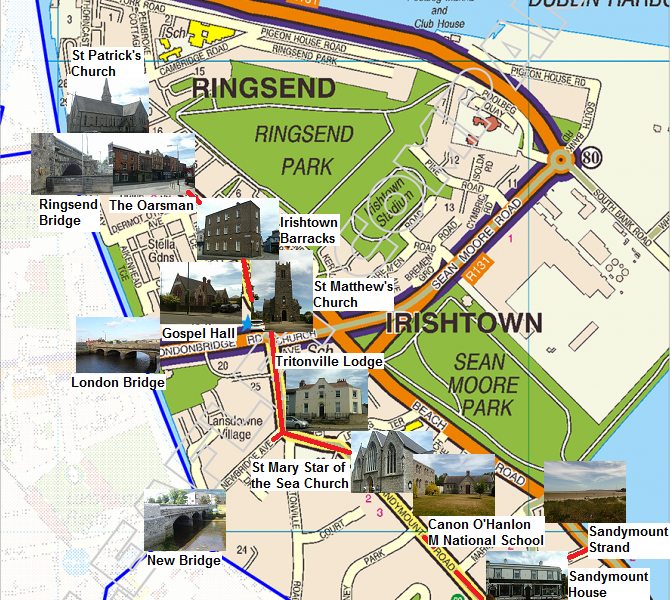
Map of Sandymount (with Irishtown & Ringsend) with notable buildings

Sandymount Green is a triangular park located next to the village. The houses along the south side of the green are part of what once was Sandymount Castle and the roads behind this bear the name. There are shops, restaurants and cafés around the green.

=== Sandymount Strand ===
The extensive Sandymount Strand, which is part of the South Bull, (a mirror to the North Bull sandbank, which grew into North Bull Island), is a major component of the south side of Dublin Bay. The strand runs from the curve of the bay at Ringsend to Merrion Gates. Sandymount Strand is a popular place for locals to take a walk. People and cars have been occasionally trapped by the incoming tide.

The promenade is a 2.5 km walkway along the coast from Gilford Avenue to Saint Alban's Park, however, there are plans to lengthen the promenade to connect with the S2S Sandycove to Sutton Cycleway.

== Sport ==
The area of Sandymount has three cricket clubs - YMCA (the 2020 All-Ireland champions), Pembroke and Railway Union, and a number of internationals line out for these clubs. For example, when Ireland beat England in an ODI in Southampton in August 2020, six of the 11 players were members of these three clubs, including captain Andy Balbirnie and Kevin O'Brien. The three clubs have 14 men's teams and a large (more variable) number of youth and women's teams. Kim Garth, the Irish-Australian cricketer, was a member of Pembroke before leaving for a contract in Australia.

The Gaelic Athletic Association club Clanna Gael Fontenoy operates in the area, with grounds between Sandymount, Irishtown and Ringsend. In 2019 and 2021, the club's U16 football teams became champions of Dublin, and several players on both those teams are from Sandymount.

The sport of rugby is also prominent in the area, with local clubs including Monkstown F.C. and Railway Union. There are also two gymnasia/fitness clubs.

Hockey is also represented by Pembroke Wanderers H.C. on Serpentine Avenue (founded in 1922). Epworth Badminton Club is also based in Sandymount.

Poolbeg's parkrun takes place on Saturdays at Sean Moore Park.

== Transport ==
The area is served by the Dublin Area Rapid Transit (DART) commuter rail system and two stops are located in the area, Sandymount and Sydney Parade. It is served by bus routes C1 and C2, S2 and 47. It was once served by route numbers 2, 3, which ceased operation and were replaced with routes 1 on 12 May 2012 and 52 which ceased operation in 1998. Bus routes 2 and 3 were brought in as replacements for the Dublin tramways routes of the same numbers, which were closed on 26 March 1940. Route number 4 also ran to Sandymount until 1932.

Both railway stations on the electrified DART suburban railway system were originally opened in January 1835 by the Dublin and Kingstown Railway and continue to this day.

== Religion ==
The Church of Ireland church of Saint John of the Evangelist is located at the top of St John's Road. The Catholic church in Sandymount is dedicated to Our Lady Star of the Sea and is near the north end of Sandymount Road. Christ Church, on Sandymount Green, is a Methodist church; Mount Tabor nursing home shares the grounds of the church. The area is also home to a house of the Franciscan Missionary Sisters for Africa.

== People ==
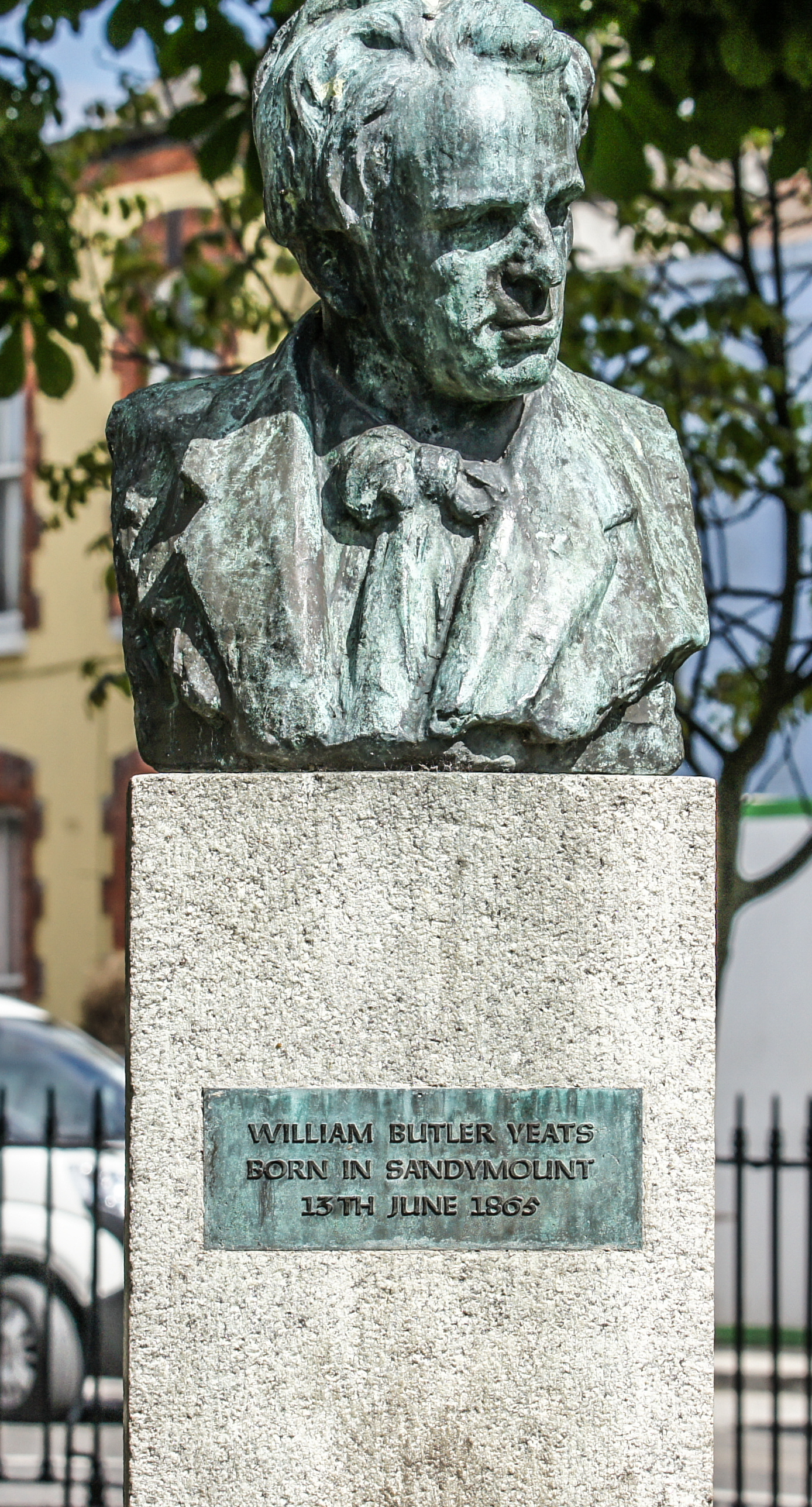
Bust of W. B. Yeats on Sandymount Green

The following people were born in Sandymount:

- John S. Beckett (1927–2007), musician, composer and conductor
- Bryan Dobson (born 1960), newscaster
- Ernest de Burgh (1863–1929), engineer
- Shay Healy (1943–2021), writer and broadcaster
- Róisín Ingle (born 1971), journalist, columnist and podcaster
- Valentin Iremonger (1918–1991), poet and diplomat
- Freda Kelly (born 1944), secretary and manager of the Beatles fan club
- Aengus Ó Snodaigh (born 1964), TD, (Teachta Dála)
- Kevin O'Brien (born 1984), Irish international cricketer
- Ruairi Quinn (born 1946), former TD, (Teachta Dála) and former cabinet minister
- Annie P. Smithson (1873–1948), novelist
- Hilary Weston (1942–2025), model and entrepreneur
- W. B. Yeats (1865–1939), poet

The following live or have lived in Sandymount:

- Gay Byrne, (1934–2019) presenter and host of radio and television, including The Late Late Show
- Fionnbar Callanan, (1930–2021), sports photographer and journalist
- Christopher Casson (1912–1996), actor
- Risteárd Cooper, actor and comedian
- Pat Cox, former MEP and broadcaster
- Lucinda Creighton (born 1980), former TD, (Teachta Dála) and former Leader of Renua
- Declan Darcy, former Leitrim and Dublin Gaelic footballer
- Ron Delany (1935-2026), Olympic 1500 m Gold medal winner
- Elizabeth Dunne (born 1956), Supreme Court Judge
- Mary Harney (born 1953), former TD, (Teachta Dála), former cabinet minister and member of the Progressive Democrats
- Seamus Heaney (1939–2013), poet
- Kevin Humphreys (born 1958), former TD, (Teachta Dála)
- Brendan Kennelly (1936–2021), poet, novelist, playwright and professor emeritus of Trinity College Dublin
- Enda Kenny (born 1951), Taoiseach lived here (1994–1997)
- Charles Lysaght, author and journalist
- Donagh MacDonagh (1912–1968) Poet, playwright, broadcaster, folklorist, district justice
- Brinsley MacNamara (1890–1963), author
- T. P. McKenna (1929–2011), actor
- Dermot Morgan (1952–1998), Irish comedian, actor
- Peter Murphy (1923–2011), radio and television broadcaster
- Sinéad O'Connor (1966–2023), musician and actress
- Geoffrey Molyneux Palmer (1882–1957), composer
- Noel Purcell (1900–1985), actor
- Eoin Ryan Snr (1920–2001), member of Seanad Éireann
- Ivan Yates (born 1959), broadcaster, former TD, (Teachta Dála) and former cabinet minister

== Popular culture ==
James Joyce based two episodes of his epic novel Ulysses at Sandymount Strand. For example, on the morning of Bloomsday, in the Proteus episode, Stephen Dedalus wanders "into eternity" on the strand. Later the same day, Leopold Bloom sits on a rock and watches while young Gertie lifts her skirt as Bloom pleasures himself. It was this incident in the Nausicaa episode which led to the banning of the book in the USA for alleged obscenity.

"In long lassoes from the Cock lake the water flowed full, covering greengoldenly lagoons of sand, rising, flowing." – Ulysses, James Joyce.

== See also ==
- List of towns and villages in Ireland
