= Merrion railway station =

Railway station in Dublin, Ireland

Merrion
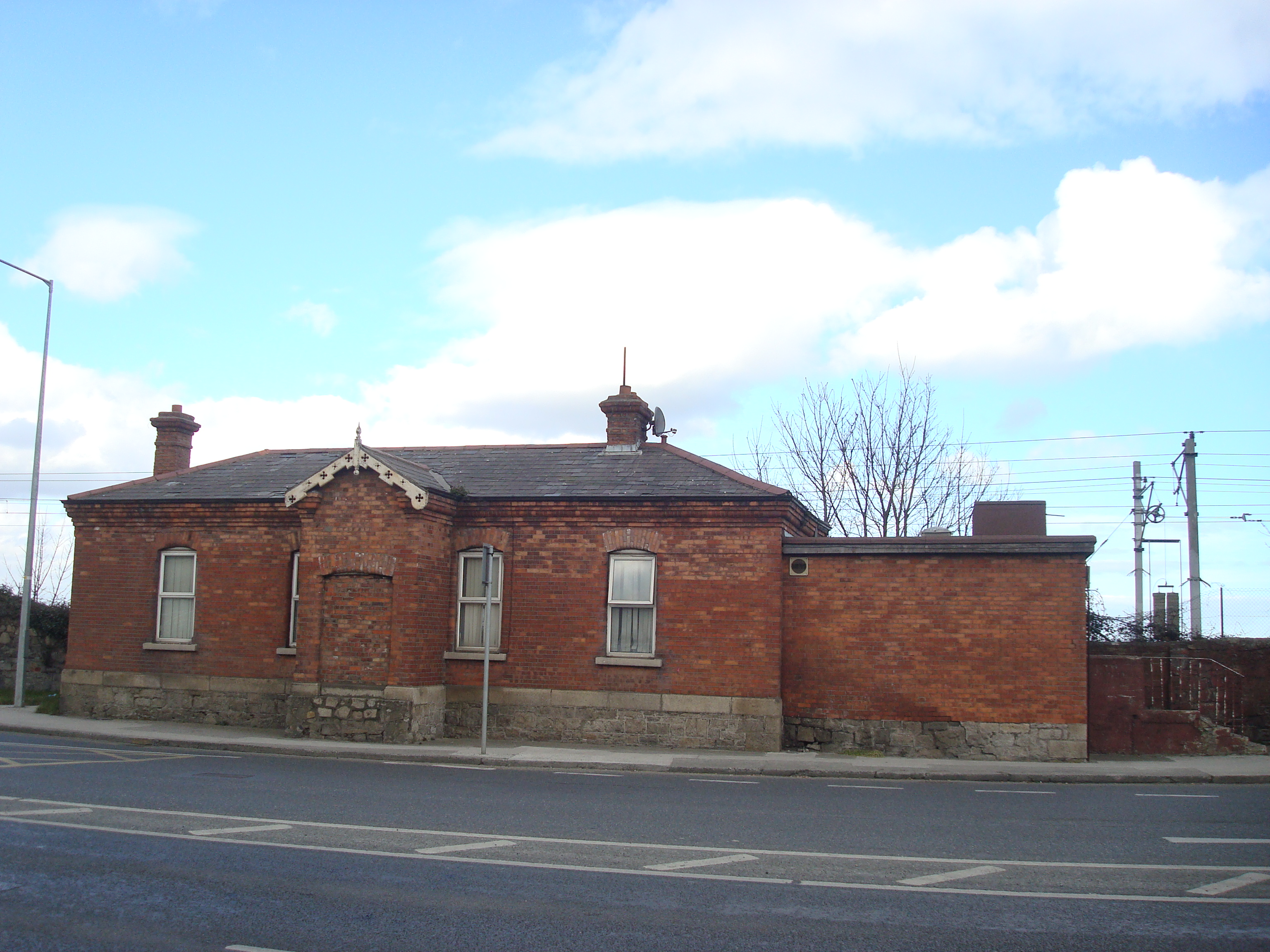
- The old station building

General information
- Location: Merrion Road; Merrion, Dublin; Ireland
- Coordinates: 53.31574°N 6.20425°W
- Owner: CIÉ Railways Division
- Operator: CIÉ Railways Division
- Platforms: 2

Construction
- Structure type: At-grade

History
- Original company: Dublin and Kingstown Railway
- Pre-grouping: Dublin and South Eastern Railway
- Post-grouping: Great Southern Railways

Key dates
- 1 January 1835: Station opens
- 1857: Line regauged from 1,435 mm (4 ft 8 1/2 in) in to 5 ft 3 in (1,600 mm)
- 30 August 1862: Station closes
- 5 April 1882: Station reopens
- 1 October 1901: Station closes a second time
- 5 March 1928: Station reopens a second time
- July 1929: Station closes a third time
- August 1930: Station reopens a third time
- September 1935: Station finally closes
Location

Merrion is a former railway station in Dublin. The disused station building lies to the immediate south of Merrion Gates in Merrion on the DART line.

The station originally opened in early 1835, shortly after the completion of the Dublin and Kingstown Railway line. It closed permanently in 1935. Today the village is served by the surrounding Booterstown and Sydney Parade stations.

Preceding station	Disused railways	Following station
Sydney Parade; Line and station open	Dublin and Kingstown Railway	Booterstown; Line and station open
