= Sydney railway station (disambiguation) =

Sydney railway station usually refers to Central railway station, Sydney in Sydney, Australia. Other uses include:

- The Sydney Parade railway station in Dublin, Ireland.
- The railway station in Sydney, Nova Scotia

== See also ==
- North Sydney railway station
