= Merrion Gates =

Railway level crossing

Coordinates: 53.316388°N 6.204953°W

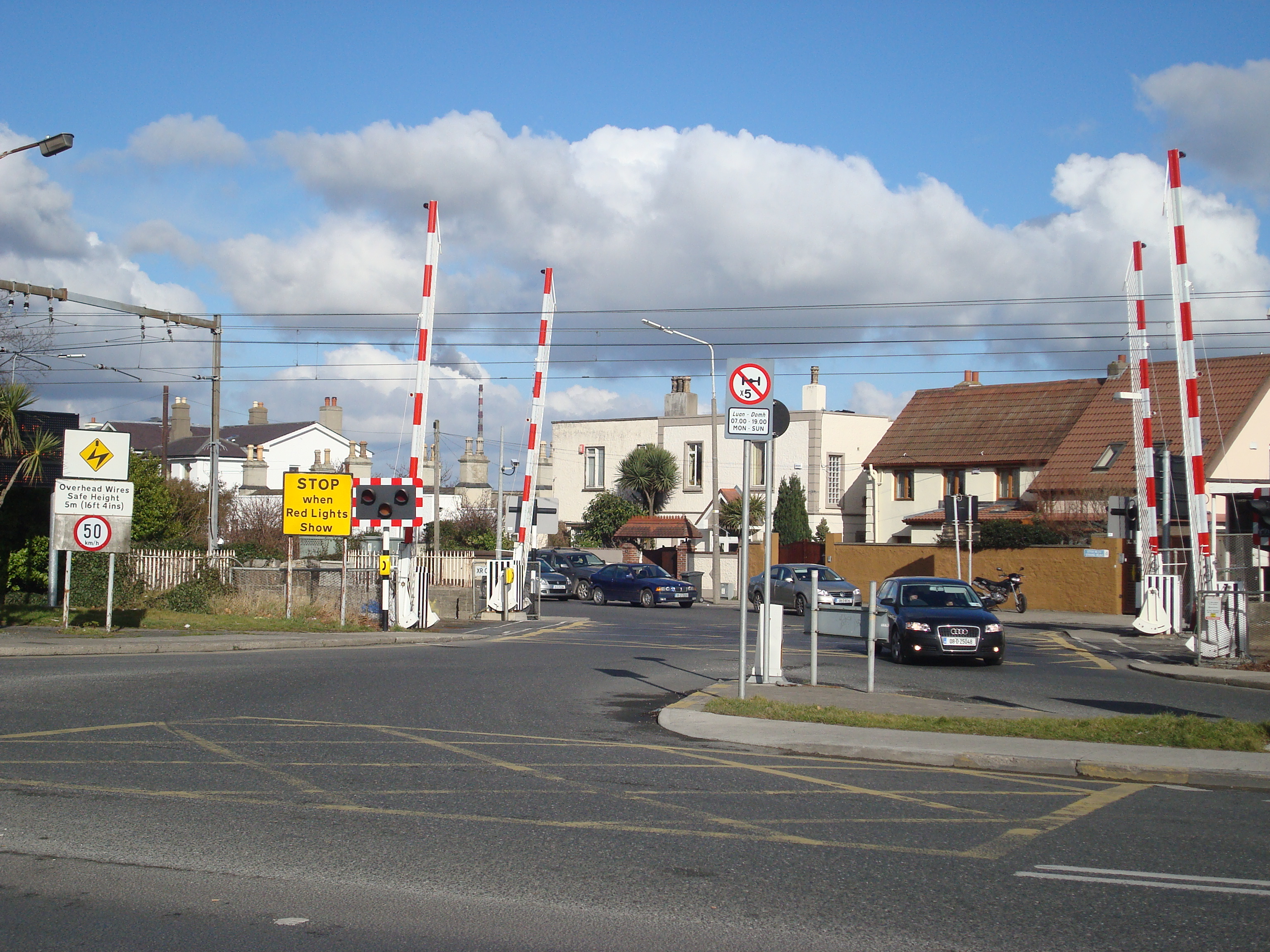
Merrion Gates level crossing

The Merrion Gates (Irish: Geataí Mhuirfean) is a railway level crossing in Merrion/Sandymount, Dublin, Ireland, where the DART and Dublin–Rosslare railway line crosses Strand Road near its junction with Merrion Road. There is pedestrian access to Sandymount Strand immediately to the east of the railway crossing.

First built in 1834, the junction is a "notorious" traffic bottleneck, which also restricts the possible frequency of railway traffic. The term "Merrion Gates" is sometimes used to refer to the surrounding area, and a number of nearby businesses take their name from the junction.

== History ==
The Merrion Gates site is close to the former Merrion Castle, which was destroyed during the Irish Rebellion of 1641. The railway line and gates were built in 1834 by the Dublin and Kingstown Railway, at a site described in some sources as a "symbolic entry point to the inner city". Important passengers, who travelled to Dublin by train from Dún Laoghaire port, were sometimes greeted at the Merrion Gates – including the Papal legate in advance of the 1932 Eucharistic Congress.

In 1921, during the Irish War of Independence, the Merrion Gates were the site of an ambush and shootout which resulted in the deaths of two civilians.

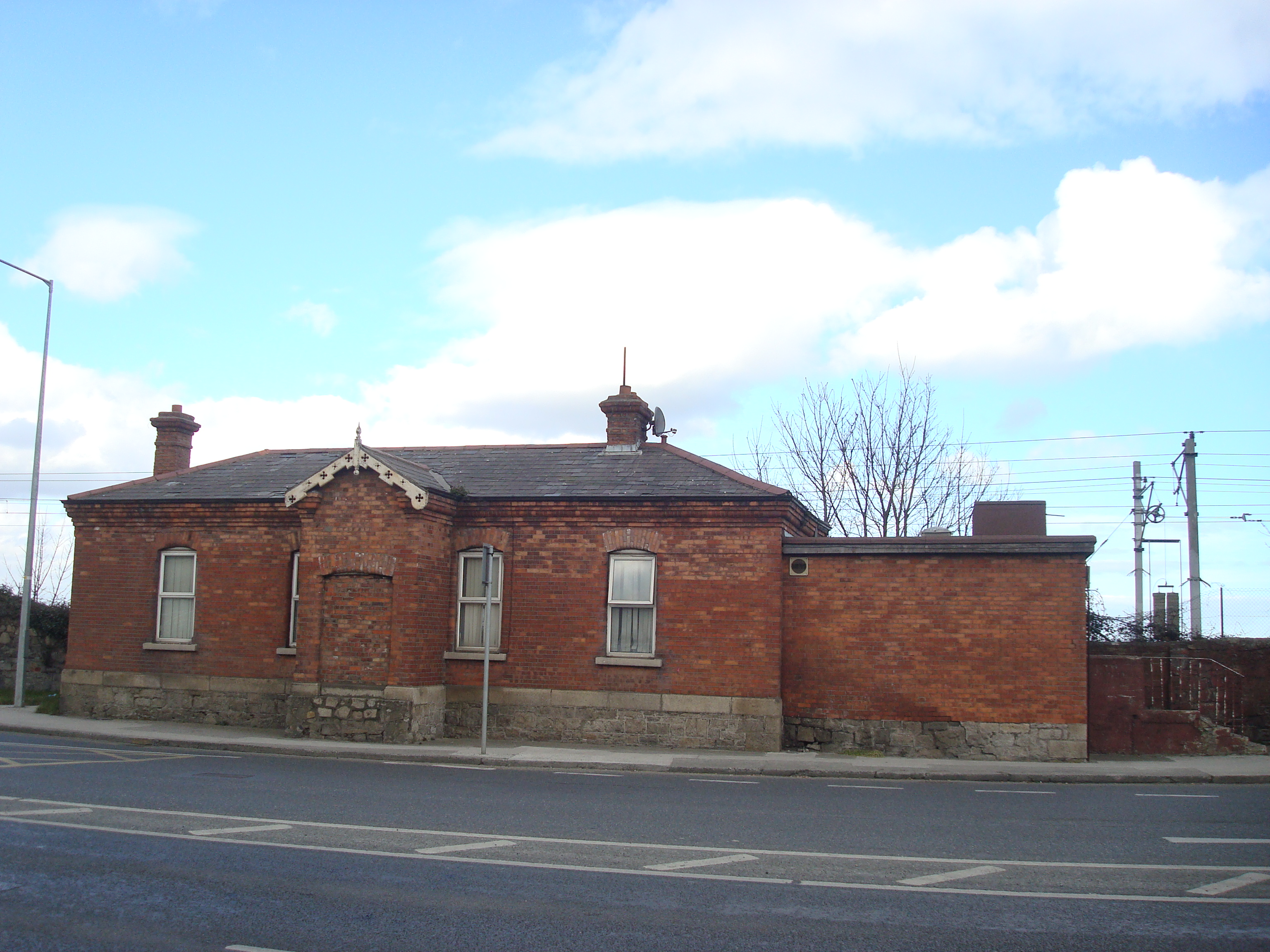
Old Merrion railway station building

The Merrion Gates railway crossing lies just north of the former Merrion railway station. This station opened in 1835 and closed in 1935. Neighbouring stations still in operation include Sydney Parade to the north and Booterstown to the south.

== Development proposals ==
As of the early 21st century, the Merrion Gates are a well-known and "notorious" traffic bottleneck, where the gates have been reportedly "closed for up to 20 minutes per hour at peak times".

In 2016, the National Transport Authority unveiled a proposal to close the Merrion Gates and to divert motor traffic onto a new road bridge to be built over the railway approximately 250 metres to the north. The proposal expected that pedestrian and cycle traffic would be routed through a tunnel under the crossing. As of mid-2018, these proposals had reportedly been "shelved".
