= Lansdowne Road railway station =

Station in Dublin, Ireland

Lansdowne Road Bóthar Lansdún
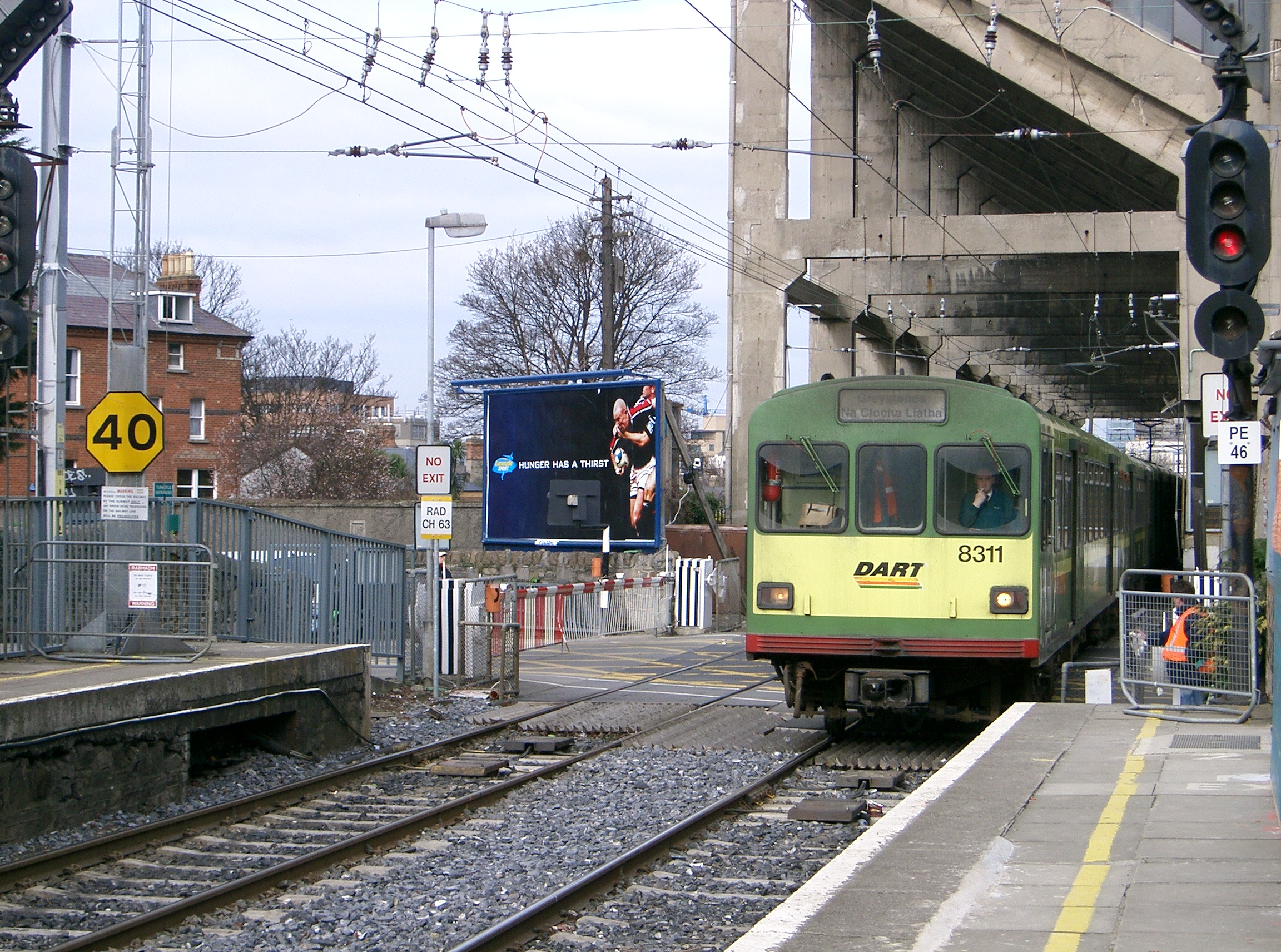
- A DART 8300 Class passes under the old Lansdowne Road Stadium and over the level crossing as it enters the station

General information
- Location: Lansdowne Road, Dublin 4, D04 V3K1; Ireland
- Coordinates: 53.33382°N 6.22914°W
- Owner: Iarnród Éireann
- Operator: Iarnród Éireann
- Platforms: 2
- Tracks: 2
- Bus stands: 0

Construction
- Structure type: At-grade
- Platform levels: 1
- Parking: No
- Cycle facilities: No
- Accessible: Yes

Other information
- Station code: LDWNE
- Fare zone: Suburban 1

History
- Original company: Dublin, Wicklow and Wexford Railway
- Pre-grouping: Dublin and South Eastern Railway
- Post-grouping: Great Southern Railways

Key dates
- 1 July 1870: Station opens
Services
Preceding station	Iarnród Éireann	Following station
Grand Canal Dock	Commuter; Northern Commuter; Peak times only	Sydney Parade
Grand Canal Dock	Commuter; Western Commuter (City Branch); Peak times only	Sydney Parade
Dublin Pearse	Commuter; South Eastern Commuter	Sydney Parade
Grand Canal Dock	DART	Sandymount
Location

Lansdowne Road railway station (Irish: Stáisiún Bhóthar Lansdúin) is a railway station in Dublin, Ireland. The station serves the Ballsbridge, Irishtown and Upper Baggot Street areas of Dublin 4.

== Facilities and services ==
The station has two through platforms, 1 is the northbound platform and platform 2 is for southbound services. These are connected via a subway. Both have separate entrances as there is a level crossing adjacent to the station on Lansdowne Road. There are 2 automated ticket vending machines at each entrance. When there is an event at the stadium, additional access points are opened to allow for crowd control. It has disability access to both platforms.

All DART services serve the station, as do several South Eastern Commuter (Dublin Connolly to Gorey) and a number of services to Drogheda, Dundalk and Maynooth.

== History ==
The station was adjacent to its namesake Lansdowne Road Stadium before the stadium was demolished in 2007 and replaced on-site by the new Aviva Stadium, which the station now serves.

The station opened in 1872. It was electrified in 1983 with the arrival of DART services.

== Gallery ==
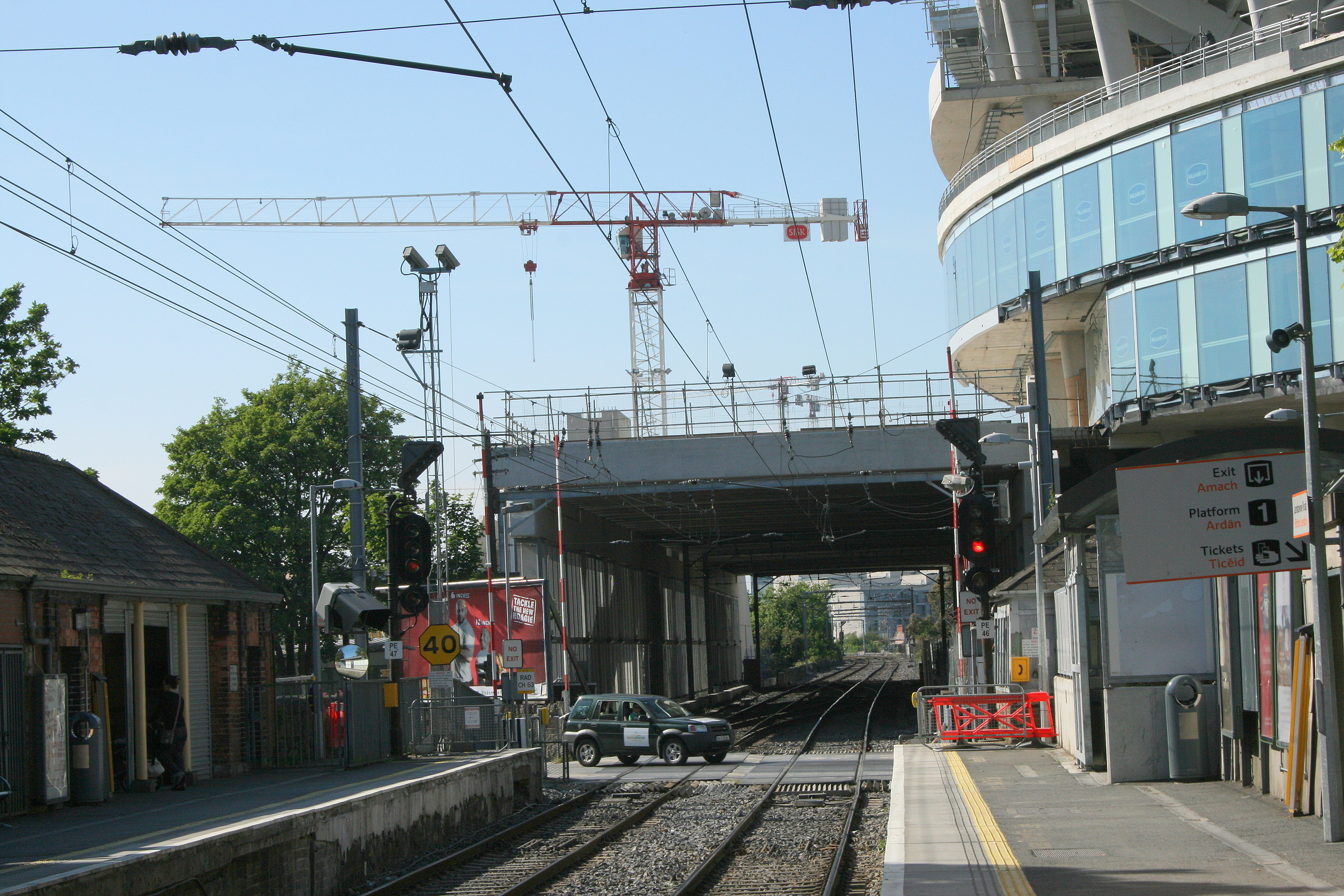
Aviva Stadium under construction (2009)

== See also ==
- List of railway stations in Ireland
