= St Vincent's Private Hospital =

St Vincent's Private Hospital may refer to:

- St. Vincent's Private Hospital (Dublin), the largest private hospital in Dublin, Ireland
- St Vincent's Private Hospital Melbourne, a group of private hospitals in Victoria, Australia
