= St. John the Evangelist, Sandymount =

Church in Ireland

Coordinates: 53°19′27″N 6°12′42″W

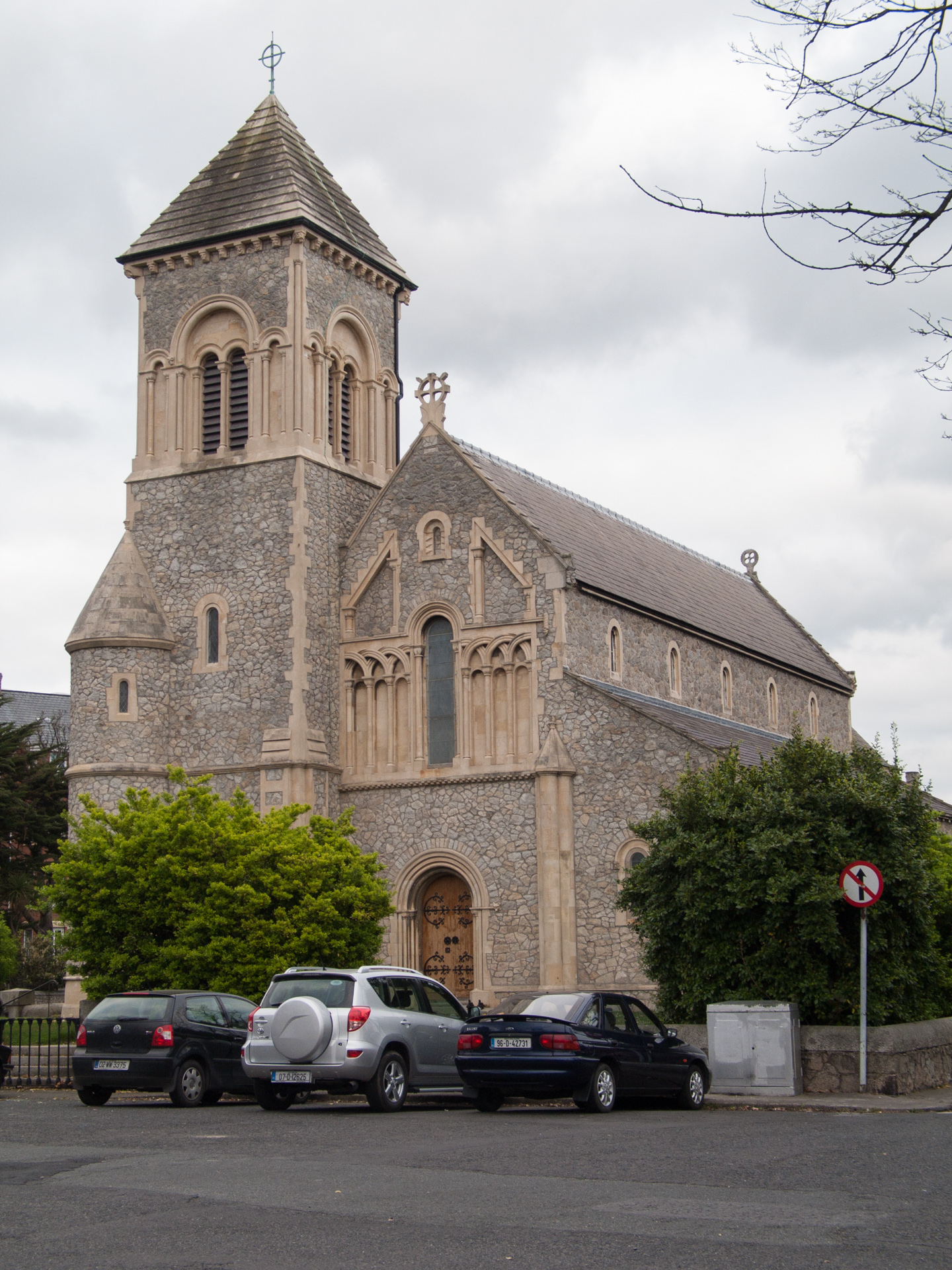
Church of Saint John the Evangelist, Sandymount

St. John the Evangelist, Sandymount is an Anglican church in Sandymount, Dublin, Ireland which is part of the Diocese of Dublin and Glendalough. Dedicated to John the Evangelist, the church was designed by architect Benjamin Ferrey and established in 1850 by the Earl of Pembroke's brother, Sidney Herbert, 1st Baron Herbert of Lea. Initially a chapel-of-ease in the parish of Donnybrook, it is now a trustee/non-parochial church in the Church of Ireland.

St John's is one of only a few Anglo Catholic churches in Ireland. Its use of high church liturgy, incense, candles, Stations of the Cross and weekly Eucharist, lead to conflicts with Irish unionists in the past. St John's was home to the Community of St. John the Evangelist, the first Anglican order of nuns in Ireland.
