= Sandymount railway station =

Railway (DART) station in Dublin, Ireland

Sandymount Dumhach Thrá
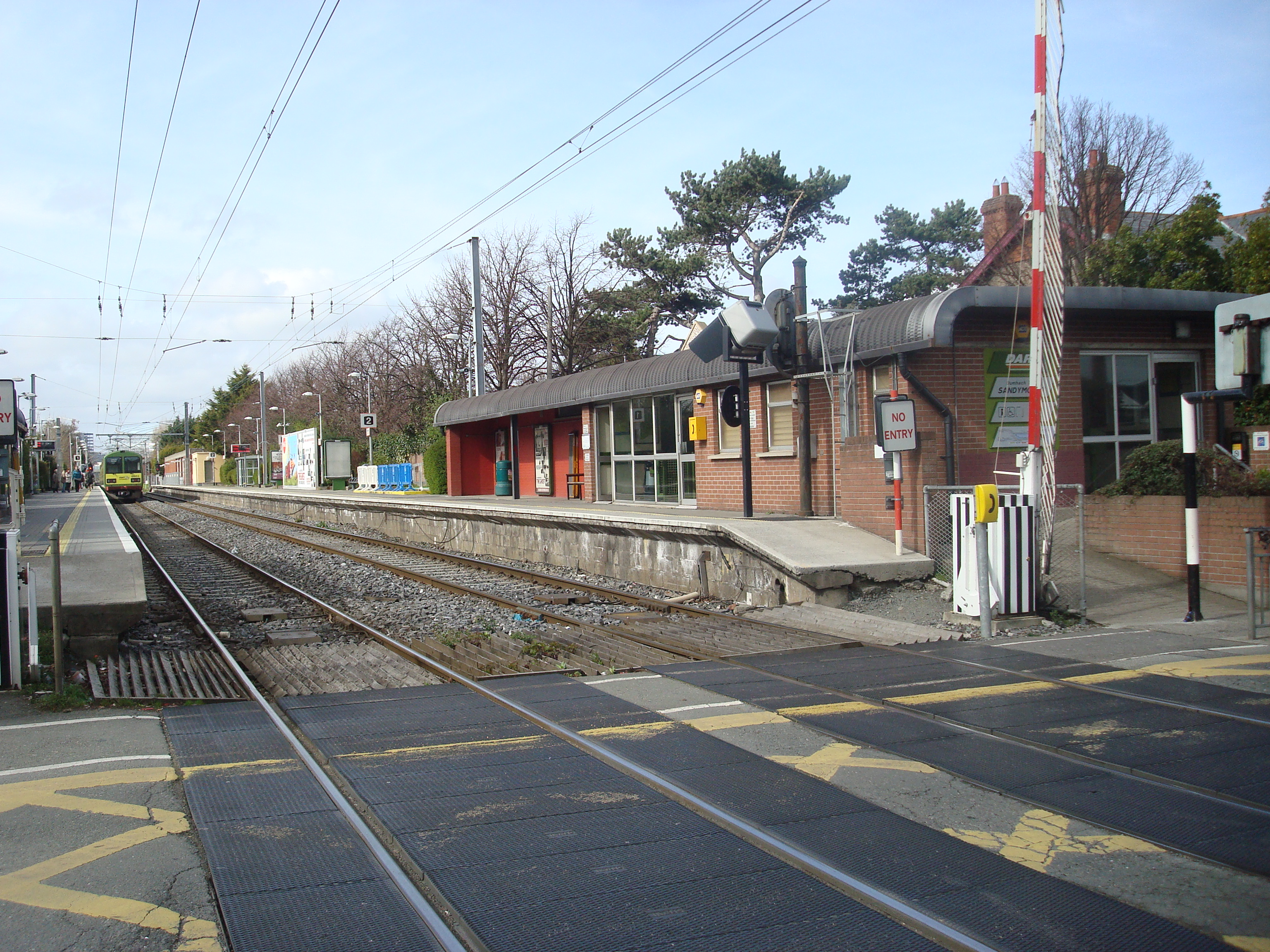
- Sandymount station looking north, with the main building on right, and a northbound DART on platform 1.

General information
- Location: Holyrood Park, Dublin, D04 PC52; Ireland
- Coordinates: 53.32795°N 6.22138°W
- Owner: Iarnród Éireann
- Operator: Iarnród Éireann
- Platforms: 2
- Tracks: 2
- Bus operators: Dublin Bus
- Connections: S2

Construction
- Structure type: At-grade
- Parking: No
- Cycle facilities: Yes
- Accessible: Yes

Other information
- Station code: SMONT
- Fare zone: Suburban 1

History
- Opened: January 1835
- Original company: Dublin and Kingstown Railway
- Pre-grouping: Dublin and South Eastern Railway
- Post-grouping: Great Southern Railways

Key dates
- 1901: Station closed
- 1928: Station reopened
- 1960: Station closed for second time
- July 1984: Station reopens for DART services
Location

Sandymount railway station (Irish: Stáisiún Dhumhach Thrá), also known as Sandymount DART station, serves Sandymount and Ballsbridge (including RDS Simmonscourt) in Dublin, Ireland. It has two platforms, both fully accessible via ramps along with a night gate from platform 2 to street level.

There is a level crossing as the railway line crosses Sandymount Avenue. The level crossing is a MCB-CCTV (manual-controlled barrier level crossing) with code XR-003.

== History ==
Sandymount Halt was originally opened in January 1835. The station has had several periods of closure: from 1841 to 1860; 1862 to 1882; 1901 to 1928 and from 1960 until it reopened in 1984. The station was reopened with the electrification of Dublin suburban rail services - launched as the DART.

The station was also re-opened with a one-off temporary platform for Queen Victoria's first visit to Ireland in 1849 when she and her entourage traveled by special train from Kingstown to Sandymount before continuing by horse carriage to Dublin.

== Operations ==
The information office is open between 05:45 to 00:21 from Monday to Friday and from 09:00 to 21:00 on Saturdays and Sundays.

== Transport services ==
Directly outside the station on Sandymount Avenue are bus stops for the following route:

- Dublin Bus route S2 from Irishtown to Heuston railway station. This route provides a connection to the Luas Green Line at Ranelagh, as well as the Red Line at Heuston.

In addition, a number of bus services stop on Merrion Road, located 200m from the station:

- Dublin Bus route 4 from Heuston railway Station to Monkstown
- Dublin Bus routes 7 / 7A from Mountjoy Square to Bride's Glen / Loughlinstown
- Dublin Bus 7N Nitelink from Dublin city centre to Shankill (Friday & Saturday only)
- Aircoach route 703 from Killiney to Dublin Airport
- Aircoach route 702 from Greystones to Dublin Airport

== See also ==
- List of railway stations in Ireland

Preceding station	Iarnród Éireann	Following station
Lansdowne Road	DART	Sydney Parade
	Historical railways	
Westland Row; Line and station open	Dublin and Kingstown Railway	Sydney Parade; Line and station open
