= Booterstown railway station =

Railway station in Dublin, Ireland

Booterstown Baile an Bhóthair
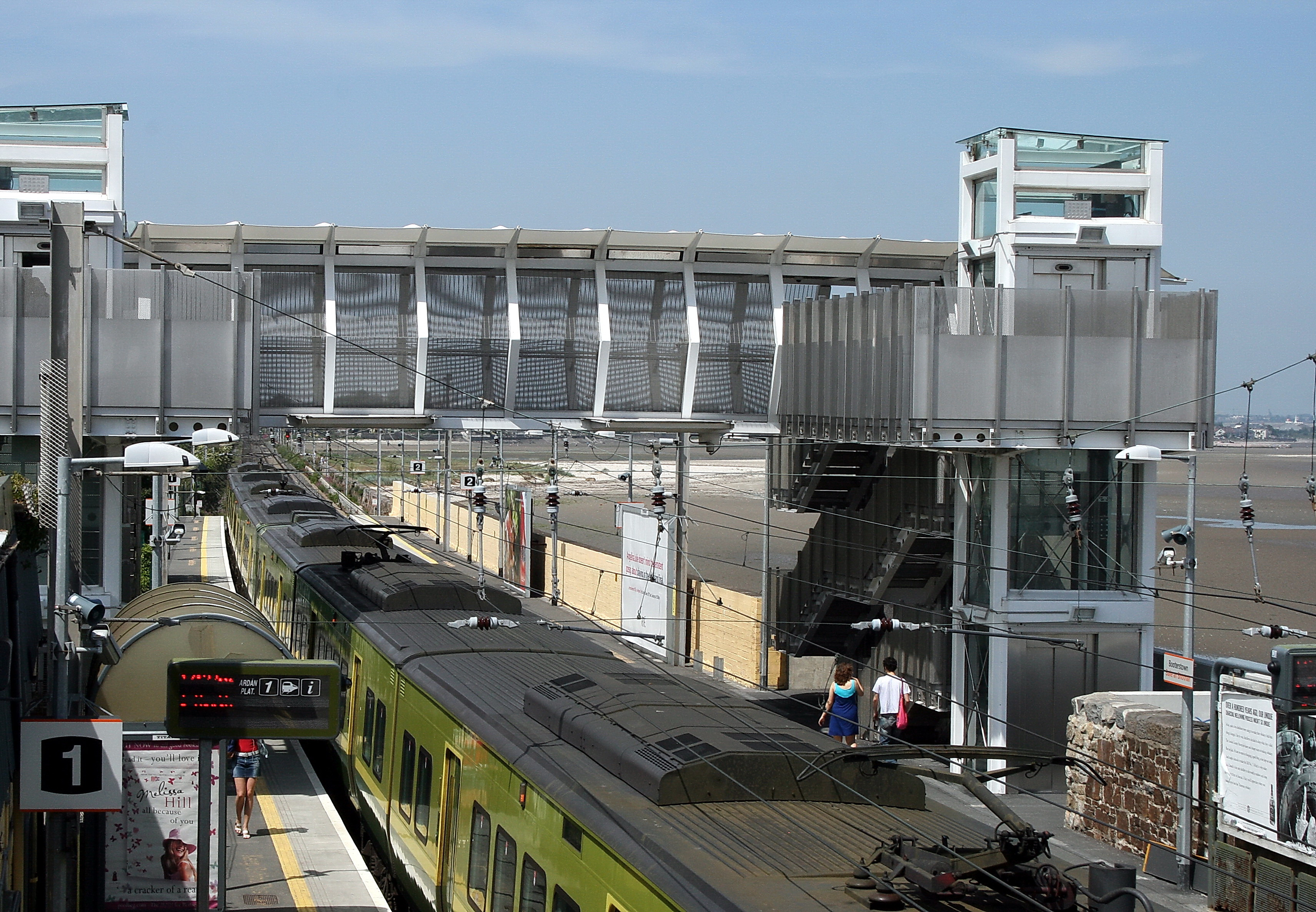
- Booterstown station facing north on 12 June 2007

General information
- Location: Rock Road, Blackrock/Booterstown; County Dublin, A94 N9P4; Ireland
- Coordinates: 53.3099°N 6.1954°W
- Owner: Iarnród Éireann
- Operator: Iarnród Éireann
- Platforms: 2
- Tracks: 2
- Bus operators: Aircoach; Dublin Bus
- Connections: 4; 7; 7A; 7N; 84N; 702

Construction
- Structure type: At-grade
- Parking: Yes
- Cycle facilities: Yes
- Accessible: Yes

Other information
- Station code: BTSTN
- Fare zone: Suburban 1

History
- Opened: January 1835
- Original company: Dublin and Kingstown Railway
- Pre-grouping: Dublin and South Eastern Railway
- Post-grouping: Great Southern Railways

Key dates
- 1857: Line regauged from 1,435 mm (4 ft 8 1/2 in) to 5 ft 3 in (1,600 mm)
- 12 September 1960: Station closed
- 7 March 1975: Station reopened
- 1983: Station upgraded
- 23 July 1984: DART services commence
Route map
Location

Booterstown railway station (Irish: Bhaile an Bhóthair) is a suburban station that serves Booterstown in Dún Laoghaire–Rathdown, Ireland.

== Location and access ==
The station is located on the coast, bordering the bird sanctuary of Booterstown marsh to the west and southeast. The road linking the station to the Rock Road runs to the southwest, with a car park beside it.

The station is fully wheelchair accessible.

The information office is open at various times between 05:45-00:00, Monday to Friday.

== History ==
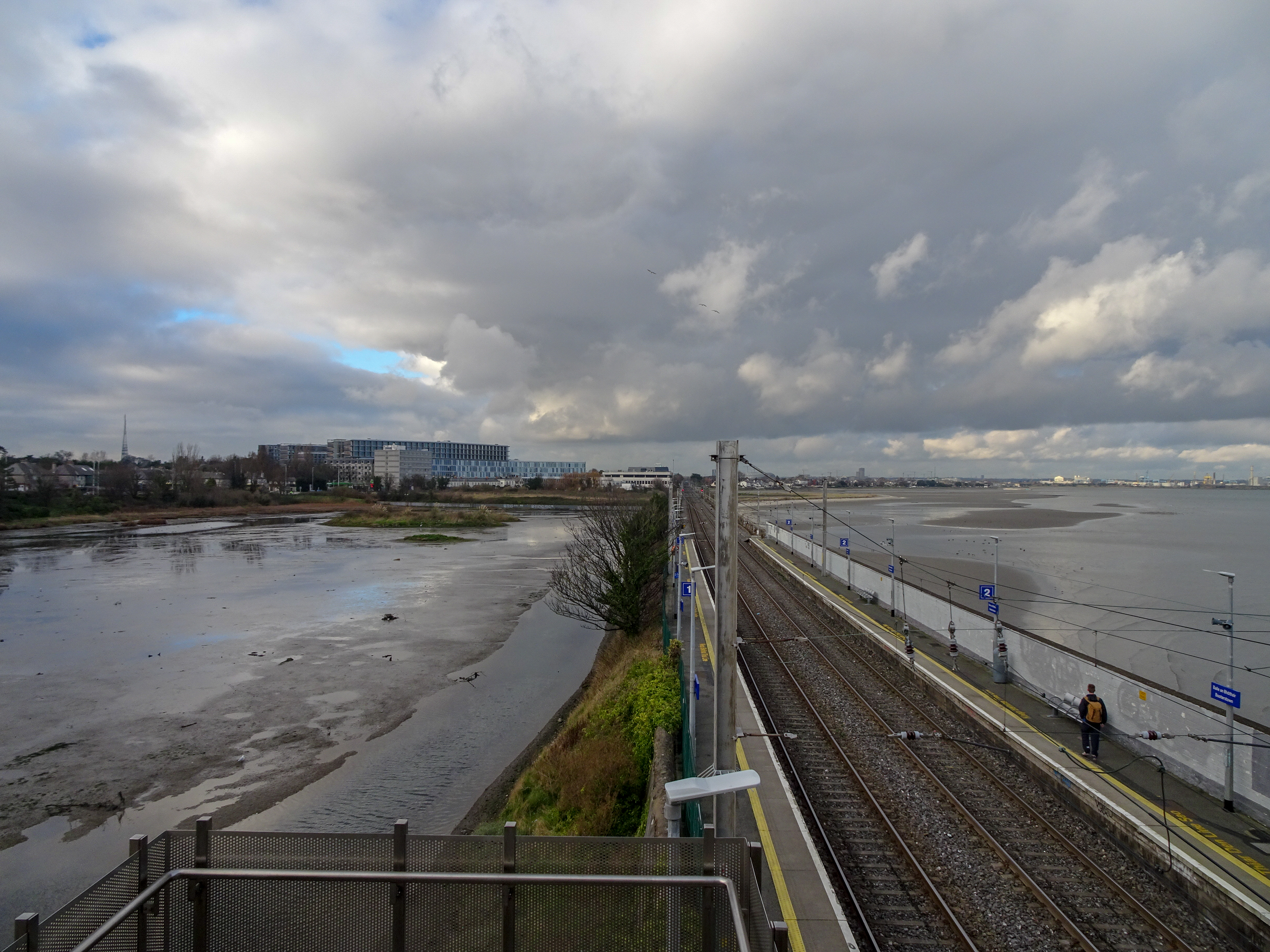
From Booterstown railway bridge the railway line can be seen dividing the marsh from sea in Dublin bay

The station opened in January 1835. It closed for a period from 12 September 1960 to 7 March 1975. The station became part of the DART service upon its opening on 23 July 1984.

The footbridge at the south end of the station was used in 1980 as the cover photographic image for the pop music single A Day Without Me by the band U2.

== Transport services ==
Directly outside the station on the Rock Road, are bus stops for the following routes

Dublin Bus:

- Route 4 from Harristown to Monkstown
- Routes 7 / 7A from Mountjoy Square to Bride's Glen / Loughlinstown. Route 7 provides a connection to the Luas Green Line terminus at Bride's Glen
- 7N Nitelink from Dublin city centre to Shankill, via Blackrock (Friday & Saturday only)
- 84N Nitelink from Dublin city centre to Greystones, via Blackrock (Friday & Saturday only)

Private Operators:

- Aircoach route 702 from Dalkey to Dublin Airport, via Booterstown

== See also ==
- List of railway stations in Ireland

Preceding station	Iarnród Éireann	Following station
Sydney Parade	DART	Blackrock
	Historical railways	
Merrion; Line open, station closed	Dublin and Kingstown Railway	Blackrock; Line and station open
