= Merrion Centre =

Merrion Centre can refer to:

- Merrion Centre, Dublin
- Merrion Centre, Leeds
