= St. Michael's Hospital (Dún Laoghaire) =

- Health Service Executive
- Shown in Dublin

Geography
- Location: Dún Laoghaire, Ireland
- Coordinates: 53.293813°N 6.13866°W

Organisation
- Care system: HSE
- Type: General

History
- Founded: 1876

Links
- Website: stmichaels.ie
- Lists: Hospitals in the Republic of Ireland

St. Michael's Hospital (Irish: Ospidéal Naomh Micheál) is a public hospital in Dún Laoghaire in Ireland. It is managed by Ireland East Hospital Group.

== History ==
The hospital, which was designed by John L. Robinson, was founded by the Sisters of Mercy in 1876. In 2001, St. Michael's Hospital joined the St. Vincent's Healthcare Group, which also administers St. Vincent's University Hospital and St. Vincent's Private Hospital. In 2007 the Sisters of Mercy sold a car park behind the hospital to Noel Smyth, a developer, for residential development. St. Vincent's Healthcare Group confirmed at the time that it had no plans to dispose of the hospital 'either by sale or site swap'.
