= Community of St. John the Evangelist =

The Community of St. John the Evangelist (CSJE) is an Anglican religious order of nuns of the Church of Ireland. Founded in 1912, the order is located in Dublin, and administers their house as a nursing and residential care home.

For some years, the Community had a priory in St. David's, Wales. This later moved to Bridgend, Wales, before consolidating with the mother house in Dublin.
