= Meriones =

Meriones may refer to:

- Meriones (mythology), a hero of the Trojan War
- Meriones (genus), a genus of gerbil that includes the species most commonly kept as a pet
- Meriones (subgenus) a subgenus of the genus Meriones that contains a single species: the Tamarisk Jird
- 3596 Meriones, a Trojan asteroid
