= Sydney Parade railway station =

Railway station in Dublin, Ireland

Sydney Parade Paráid Sydney
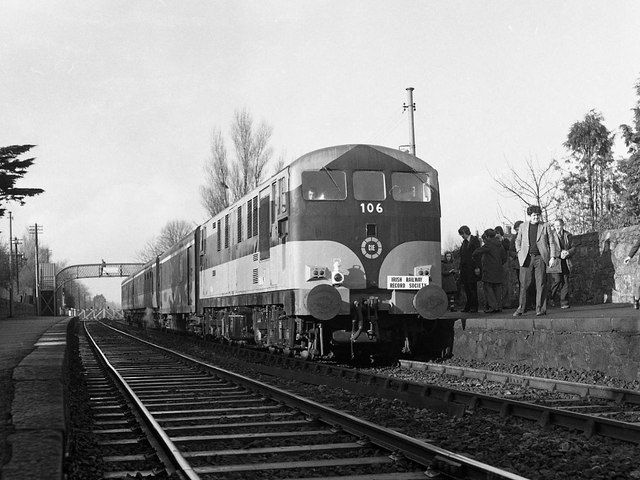
- The station in 1978

General information
- Location: Sydney Parade Avenue; Dublin 4, D04 FC91; Ireland
- Coordinates: 53.3208°N 6.2115°W
- Owner: Iarnród Éireann
- Operator: Iarnród Éireann
- Platforms: 2
- Tracks: 2
- Bus routes: 1
- Bus operators: Dublin Bus
- Connections: 47

Construction
- Structure type: At-grade
- Parking: No
- Cycle facilities: No
- Accessible: Yes

Other information
- Station code: SIDNY
- Fare zone: Suburban 1

History
- Opened: 1 January 1835
- Original company: Dublin and Kingstown Railway
- Pre-grouping: Dublin and South Eastern Railway
- Post-grouping: Great Southern Railways

Key dates
- 1 October 1852: Halt upgraded to station
- 1857: Line regauged from 1,435 mm (4 ft 8 1/2 in) in to 5 ft 3 in (1,600 mm)
- 12 September 1960: Station closed
- 6 June 1972: Station reopens
- 1983: Station upgraded
- 23 July 1984: DART services commence
- 2014: Station refurbished
Location

Sydney Parade Railway Station (Irish: Pharáid Sydney) is a suburban station located on Sydney Parade Avenue in Dublin 4, Ireland.

== History ==
The station opened on 1 January 1835, as a halt on the Dublin and Kingstown Railway. In 1852, it was upgraded to a full station with the construction of shelters, stone platforms and a footbridge.

It was named after Sidney Herbert, 1st Baron Herbert of Lea.

The station was closed between 12 September 1960 and 6 June 1972. It was electrified in 1984 with the launch of DART services.

== Location and access ==
Sydney Parade serves the southern end of Dublin 4, St Vincent's Hospital at Elm Park and the RTÉ Radio and Television studios at Montrose, Donnybrook.

There is a level crossing with code XR-004 at the northern end of the station.

The information office is open at various times between 06:00-00:00, Monday to Friday. It is unstaffed on Saturday and Sunday.

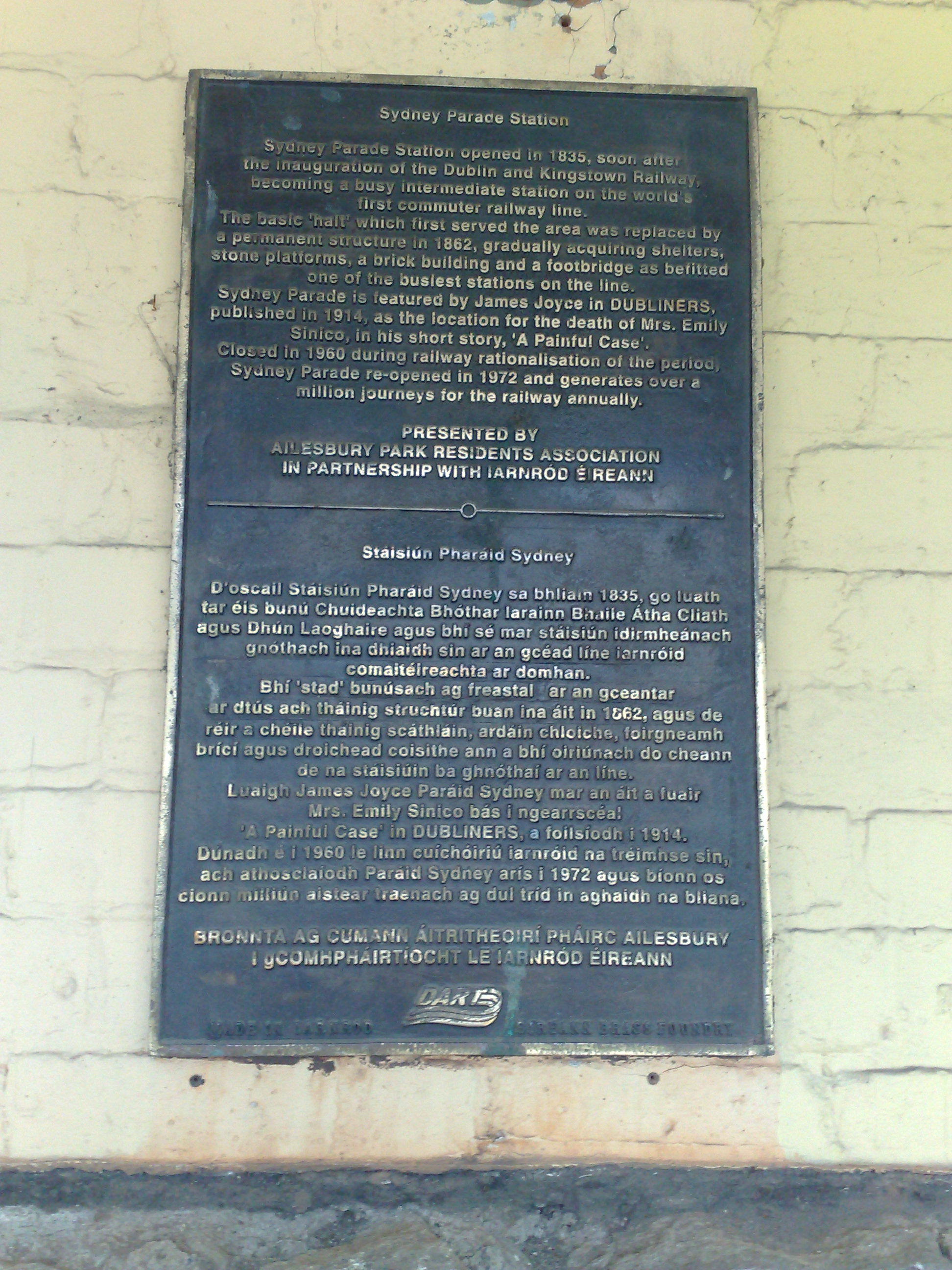
Plaque in shelter on southbound platform of Sydney Parade

== Transport services ==
Directly outside the station are bus stops for the following routes:

- Dublin Bus route 47 from Poolbeg Street to Belarmine, via UCD
- UCD Shuttle, from the station to UCD Belfield Campus (term time only)

In addition, a number of bus services stop on Merrion Road, located 350 m from the station.

- Dublin Bus route 4 from Harristown to Monkstown
- Dublin Bus routes 7 / 7A from Mountjoy Square to Bride's Glen / Loughlinstown.
- Dublin Bus 7N Nitelink from Dublin city centre to Shankill (Friday & Saturday only)
- Dublin Bus 84N Nitelink from Dublin city centre to Greystones (Friday & Saturday only)
- Aircoach route 703 from Killiney to Dublin Airport
- Aircoach route 702 from Greystones to Dublin Airport

== Literary references ==
- A crucial incident in the story "A Painful Case" by James Joyce (from his collection Dubliners) occurs here.
- The station is mentioned in the title of the bestselling book Should Have Got Off at Sydney Parade authored under the pen-name Ross O'Carroll-Kelly.
- The station is mentioned in the 2023 novel Ruth & Pen by Emilie Pine.

== See also ==
- List of railway stations in Ireland

Preceding station	Iarnród Éireann	Following station
Lansdowne Road	Commuter; South Eastern Commuter	Blackrock
Sandymount	DART	Booterstown
	Historical railways	
Sandymount; Line and station open	Dublin and Kingstown Railway	Merrion; Line open, station closed
