= St. Vincent's Private Hospital (Dublin) =

- St. Vincent's Healthcare Group
- Shown in Dublin

Geography
- Location: Dublin, Ireland
- Coordinates: 53.3154°N 6.2091°W

Organisation
- Care system: Private
- Type: Private hospital

Services
- Beds: 236

History
- Founded: 1974

Links
- Website: www.svph.ie

St. Vincent's Private Hospital (SVPH) is a private hospital in Dublin, Ireland.

== History ==
SVPH was founded in 1974 by the Religious Sisters of Charity. The rebuilding of the hospital, to a design by Scott Tallon Walker Architects, was undertaken by John Paul Construction and completed in 2012. It is the largest private hospital in Dublin. SVPH is part of the St. Vincent's Healthcare Group (SVHG), along with St. Vincent's University Hospital and St. Michael's Hospital.
