= St. Vincent's University Hospital =

Hospital in Dublin, Ireland

- Health Service Executive
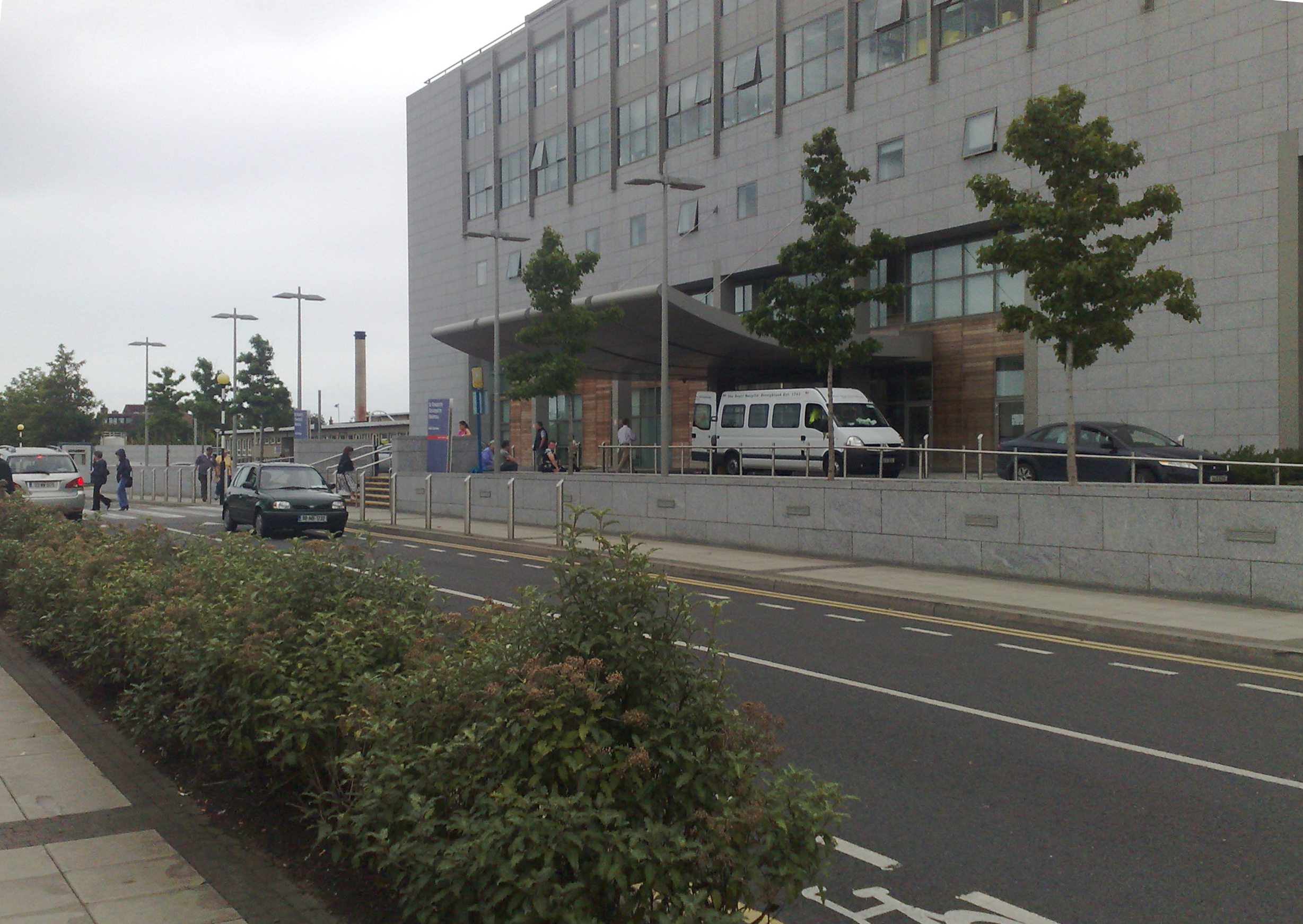
- St. Vincent's Hospital main entrance

- Location in Dublin

Geography
- Location: Merrion Road; Elm Park, Dublin, Ireland
- Coordinates: 53°19′0.09″N 6°12′45.85″W

Organisation
- Care system: HSE
- Type: Teaching hospital
- Affiliated university: University College Dublin

Services
- Emergency department: Yes Accident & Emergency
- Beds: 600

History
- Founded: 1834

Links
- Website: http://www.stvincents.ie/
- Lists: Hospitals in the Republic of Ireland

St. Vincent's Hospital (Irish: Ospidéal Ollscoile Naomh Uinseann) is a teaching hospital in Dublin, Ireland. It is located at Elm Park in the south-eastern outskirts of Dublin city. Precisely, it is at the junction of Merrion Road and Nutley Lane, opposite the Merrion Centre and adjacent to Elm Park Golf Club.

== History ==
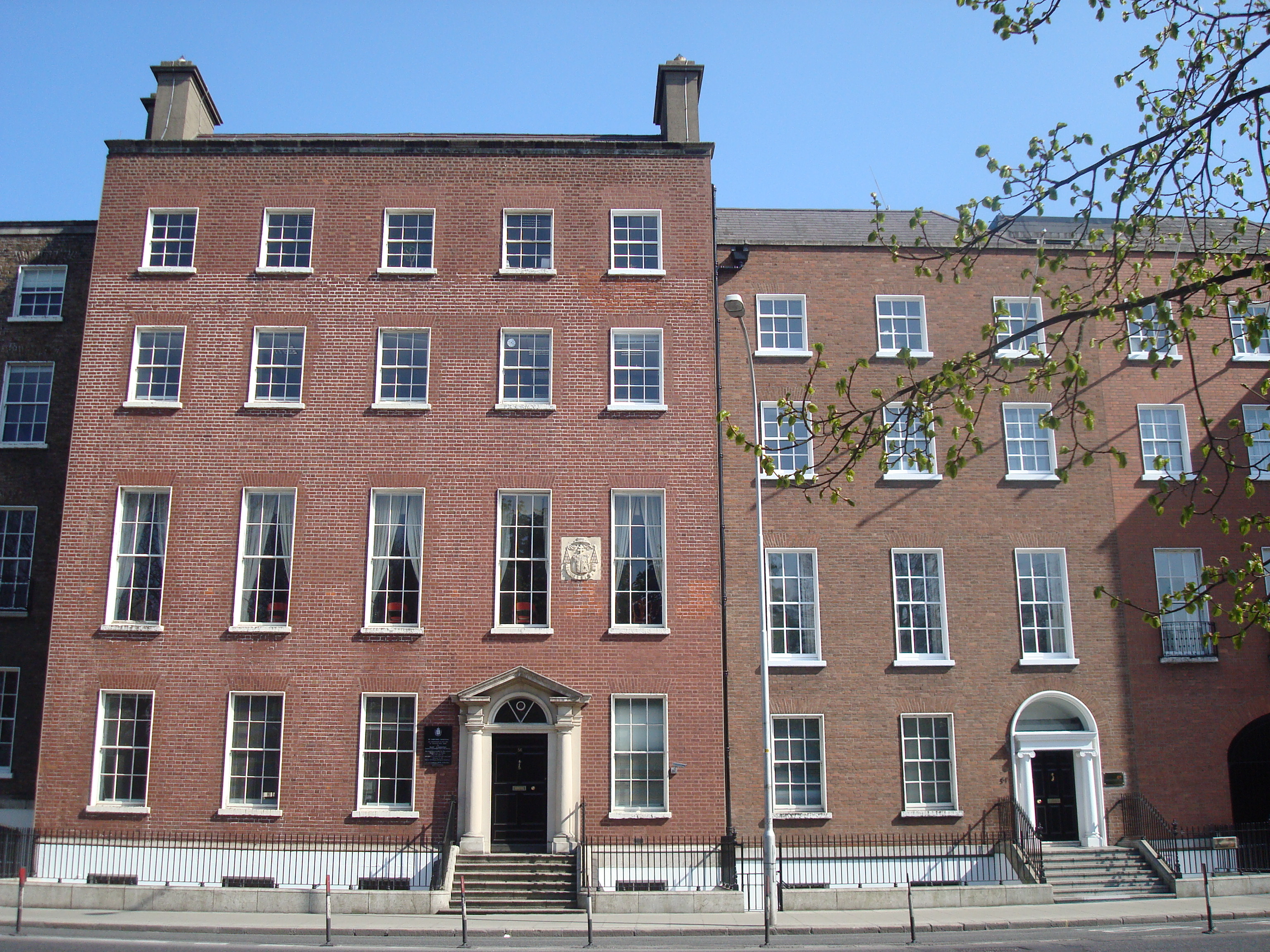
The old St Vincent's Hospital at St Stephen's Green founded in 1834

The hospital was established by Mother Mary Aikenhead, founder of the Catholic order Religious Sisters of Charity, at the Earl of Meath's former home at 56 St Stephen's Green, Dublin, in 1834. The hospital was open to all who could afford its services, irrespective of their religious persuasion. Florence Nightingale, famously was rejected twice there for a post as a trainee nurse. It was legally registered as a company on 28 March 1927. It was subsequently moved to its current site in Elm Park in 1970, and in 1999 was renamed St. Vincent's University Hospital, to highlight its position as a principal teaching hospital of University College Dublin. Along with St. Michael's Hospital and St. Vincent's Private Hospital, it is part of the St. Vincent's Healthcare Group (SVHG).

The first kidney transplant in Ireland took place in there on 19 December 1963.

In May 2013, it was announced that the new National Maternity Hospital, Dublin would relocate to the site of St. Vincent's University Hospital and that the Sisters of Charity were to have responsibility for owning and managing the new hospital. On 29 May 2017, in response to weeks of pressure and public concern, the Sisters announced that they were ending their role in St Vincent's Healthcare Group and would not be involved in the ownership or management of the new hospital; the two sisters on the board resigned. This was described as "a major turning point in the history of religious involvement in Irish healthcare."

On 8 May 2020, it was announced that the Religious Sisters of Charity would transfer ownership of St Vincent's Healthcare Group to the State. They confirmed that they had received permission from the Holy See to transfer the property, worth some €200 million. The St Vincent's Healthcare Group site could then be transferred from the ownership of the religious order to a new independent charitable group to be called St Vincent's Holdings CLG.

In January 2023 the hospital announced that it was creating an inventory of religious iconography around the hospital in order to return them to the religious order after a shares transfer.

== Services ==
The hospital serves as a regional centre for emergency medicine and medical care at an inpatient and outpatient level. Many patients from regional and tertiary hospitals are referred to St Vincent's for specialist care, and it is the national referral centre for liver transplantation and adult cystic fibrosis. Tied closely to the university, it serves as a training ground for doctors, nurses, radiographers and physiotherapists, teaching students from UCD's undergraduate degree courses.

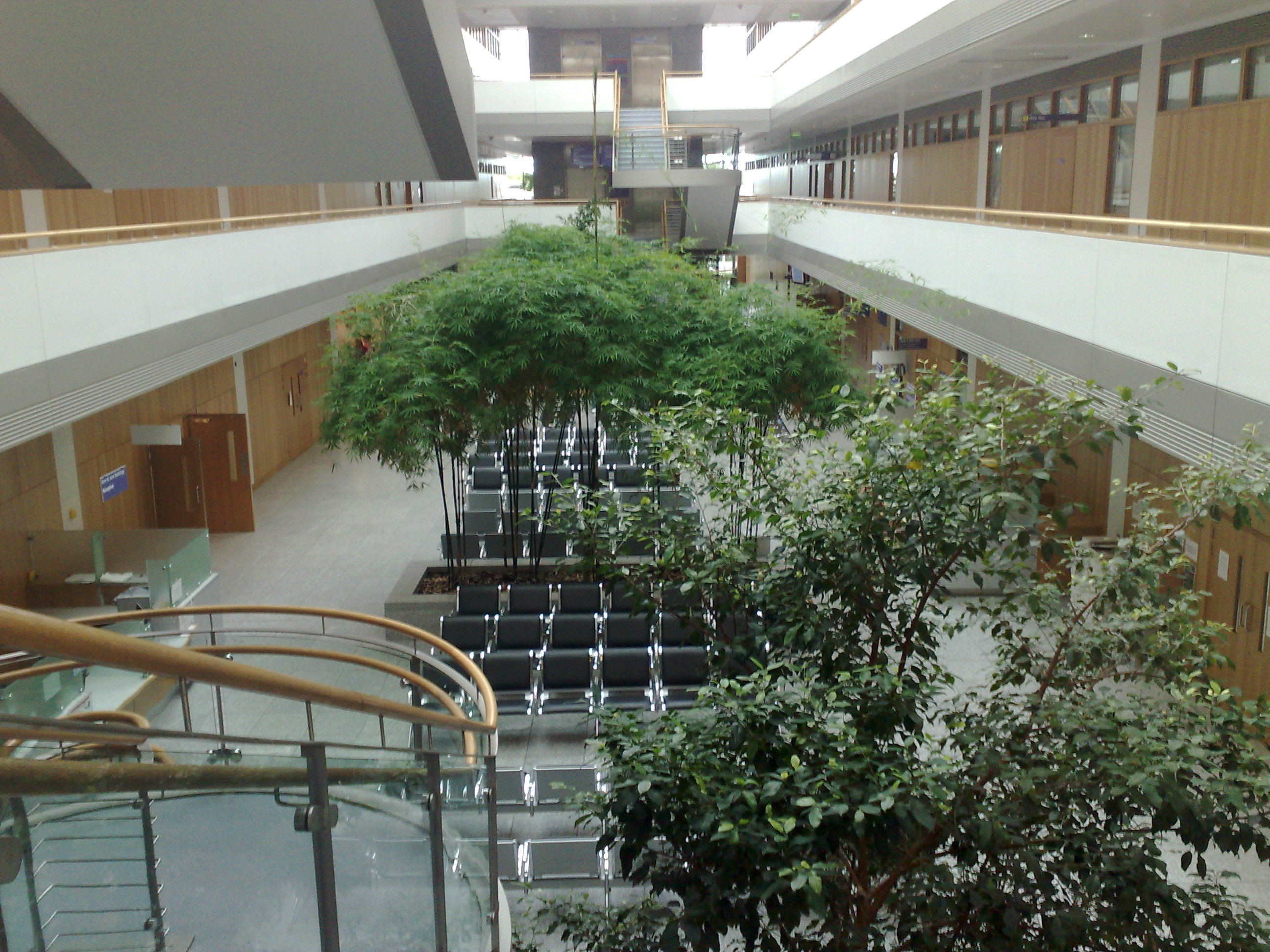
Outpatients department atrium

== Transport ==
Sydney Parade railway station is about five minutes walk from the hospital. The following Dublin Bus routes service the hospital:

To/From	Route Number
Monkstown/Harristown	Route 4
Mountjoy Square/Brides Glen	Route 7
Mountjoy Square/Loughlinstown Park	Route 7a
Blackrock/Rialto	Route 17
UCD Belfield/Clare Hall	Route 27x
Poolbeg St/Belarmine	Route 47
St. Vincent's University Hospital/Bray	Route 84a

== See also ==
- Dublin Hospitals Rugby Cup
