= Merrion, Dublin =

Merrion Muirfin
- Suburb
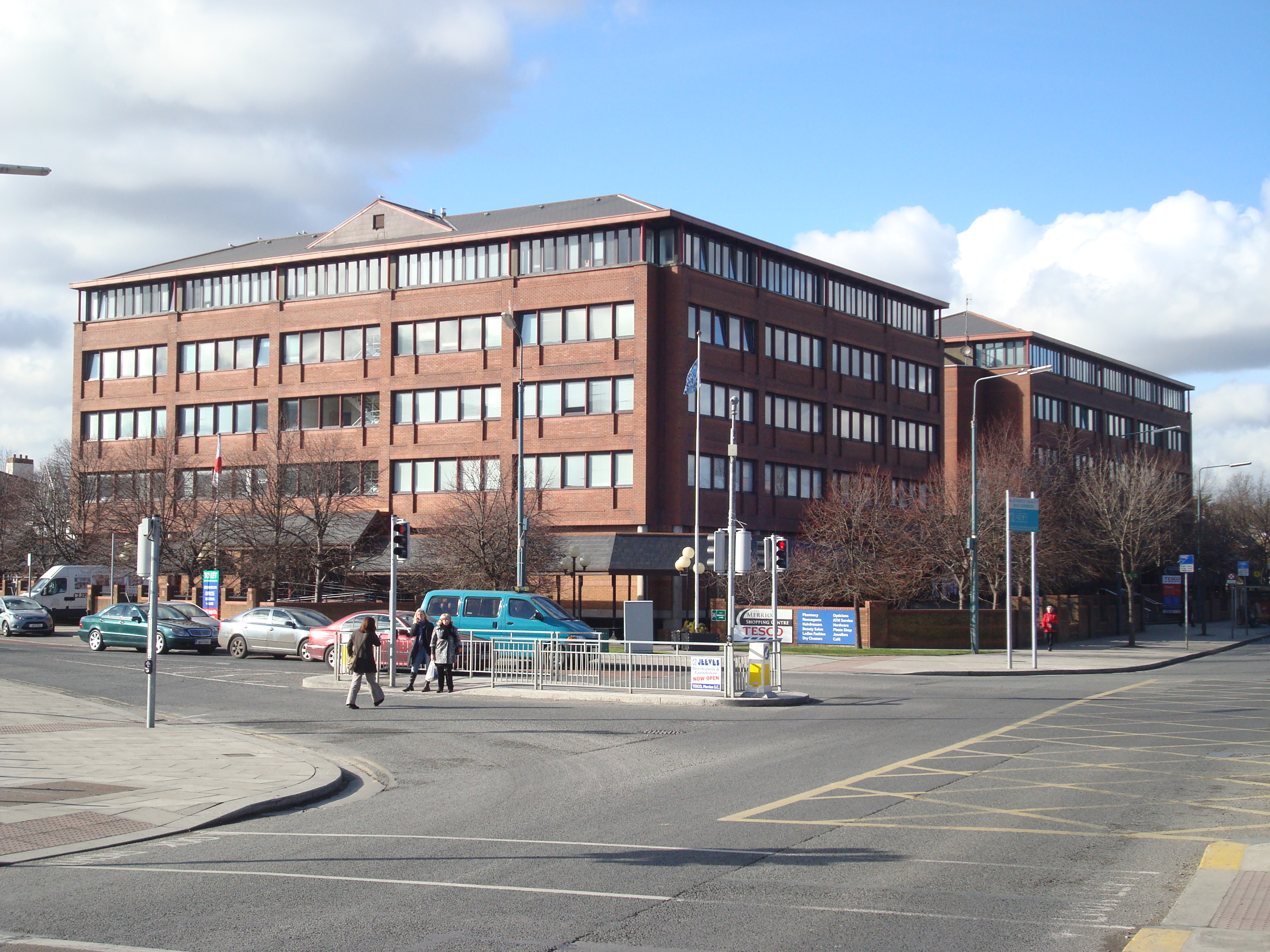
- The Merrion Centre (shopping centre)

- Location in Ireland
- Coordinates: 53°19′00″N 6°12′31″W
- Country: Ireland
- Province: Leinster
- County: County Dublin

Government
  - Dáil constituency: Dublin Bay South
  - Local authority: Dublin City Council
- Time zone: UTC+0 (WET)
  - Summer (DST): UTC-1 (IST (WEST))
- Eircode routing key: D04
- Area code: 01, +353 1
- Irish Grid Reference: O190325

Merrion (Irish: Muirfin) is a townland and southside suburb of Dublin, Ireland. The townland has an area of approximately 0.8 square kilometres (0.3 sq mi).

Merrion is situated along the Merrion Road between Ballsbridge to the north and Booterstown to the south. This stretch of road, about 1 km long, contains a shopping mall (the Merrion Centre), St. Vincent's University Hospital, a Catholic church (Our Lady Queen Of Peace), the Merrion Inn public house, a petrol station, a Bank of Ireland branch, a restaurant and several retail outlets.

Merrion lies within the administrative area of Dublin City, and ends at the border of the administrative area of Dún Laoghaire–Rathdown, near the Merrion Gates.
