= Merrion Road =

Road in Dublin, Ireland

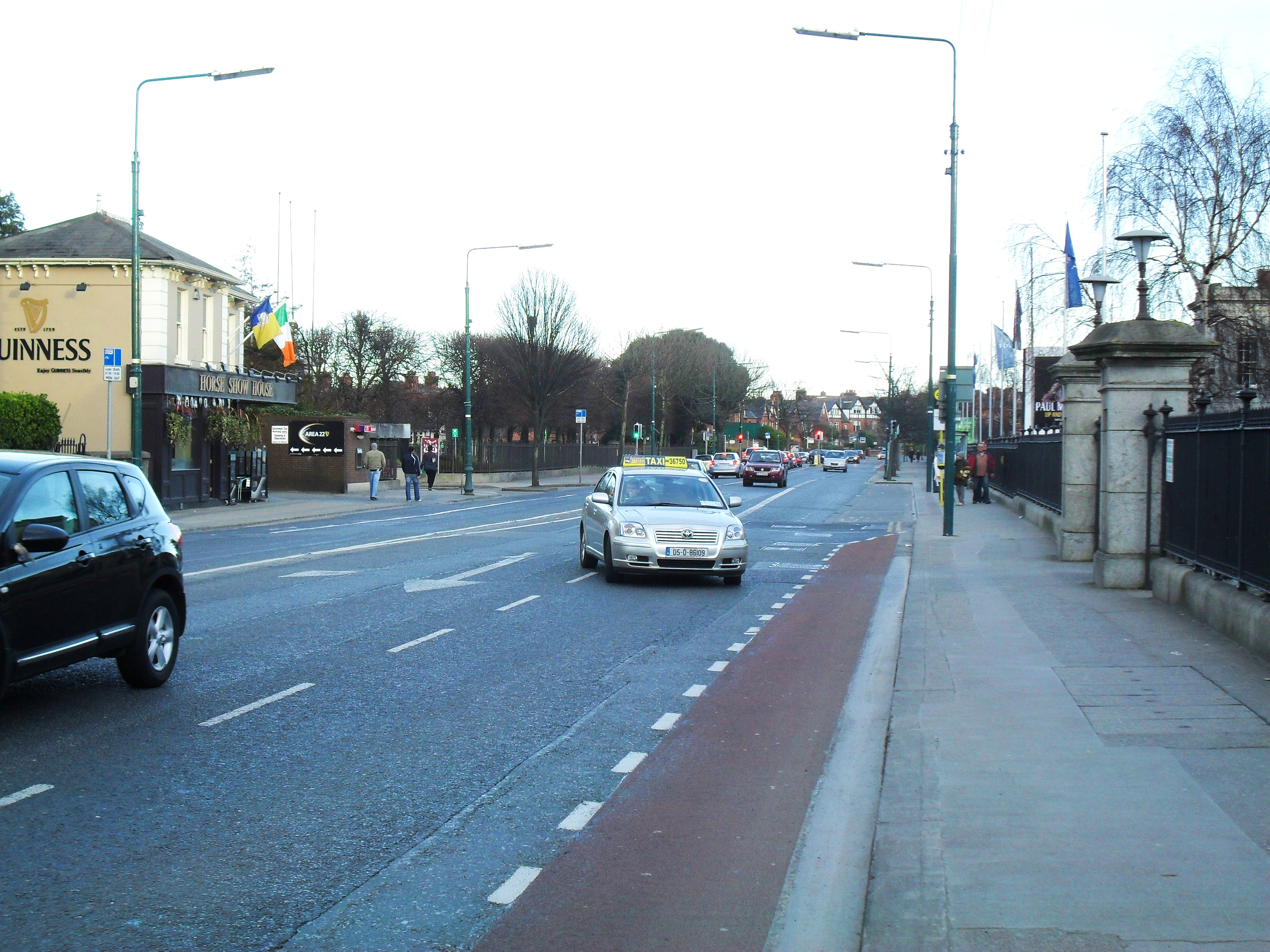
- Merrion Road near the entrance to the RDS

- Location within Dublin
- Native name: Bóthar Mhuirfean (Irish)
- Namesake: Merrion Castle, seat of the Viscounts FitzWilliam
- Length: 2.9 km (1.8 mi)
- Width: 24 metres (79 ft)
- Location: Dublin, Ireland
- Postal code: D04
- Coordinates: 53.3210°N 6.2163°W
- north end: Ball's Bridge
- south end: Rock Road, Trimleston Avenue

Other
- Known for: St. Vincent's University Hospital, Wanderers F.C., Royal Dublin Society, embassies

Merrion Road (Irish: Bóthar Mhuirfean) is a major road, part of the R118, in Dublin 4.

It joins the Pembroke Road section of the R118 at Herbert Park and runs southeast to Merrion, where it meets the Rock Road at Booterstown. At Merrion Gates, it meets Strand Road (R131) just after the latter crosses the DART line.

There are a number of well-known buildings along Merrion Road, including the Royal Dublin Society (RDS), the British Embassy, a Catholic church (Our Lady Queen Of Peace), the Merrion Shopping Centre, several hotels and parts of the "embassy belt" at Ballsbridge. The grounds of Wanderers F.C. rugby club and St. Vincent's University Hospital are also located on the road.

== See also ==
- List of streets and squares in Dublin
