= Merrion Centre, Dublin =

Small suburban shopping centre, Dublin, Ireland

Coordinates: 53.3188°N 6.2133°W

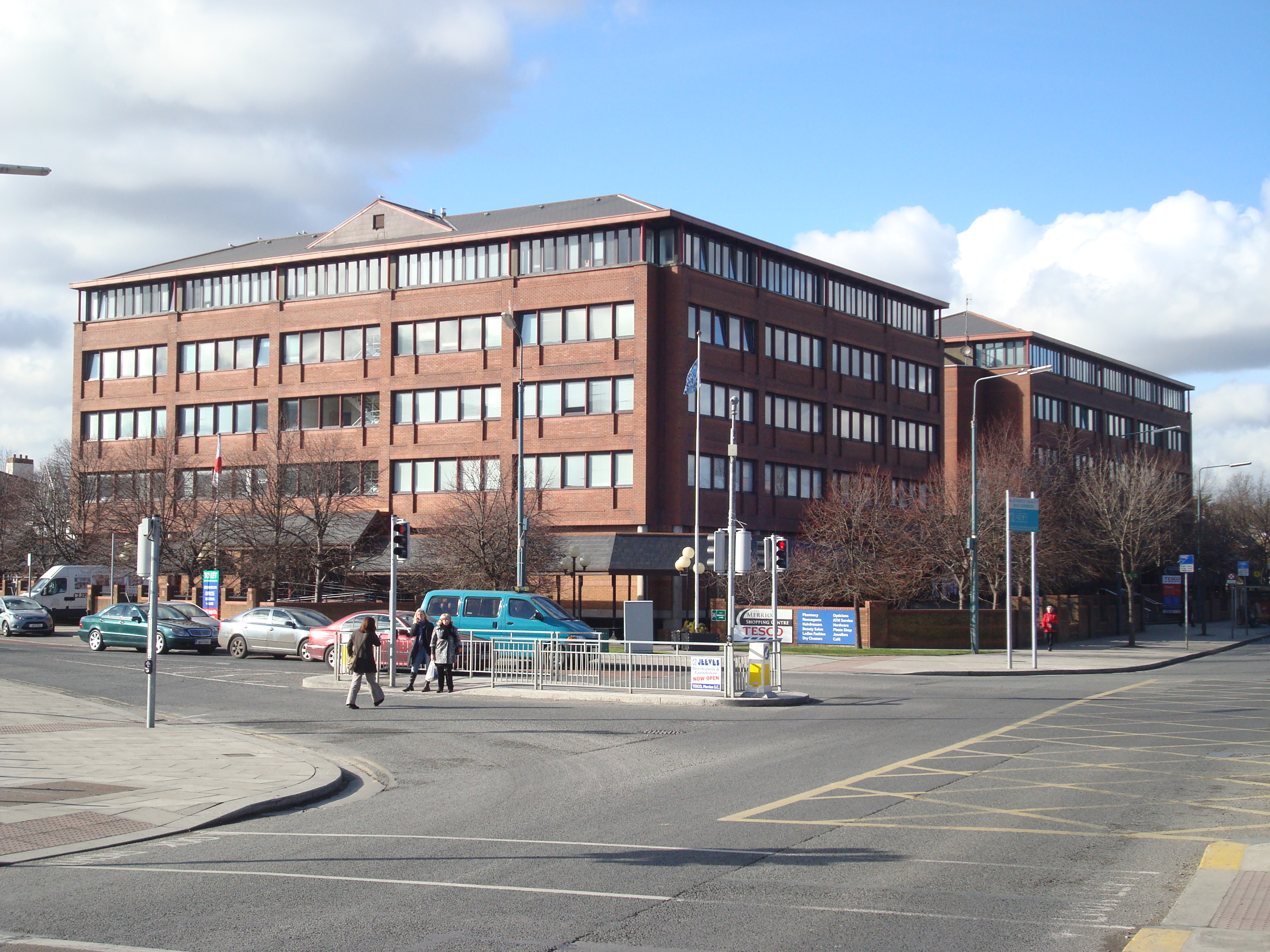
The Merrion Centre

The Merrion Centre is a small shopping centre in Merrion, Dublin, Ireland. It is situated at the junction of Nutley Lane with Merrion Road, opposite St. Vincent's University Hospital. It serves the community of Dublin 4. It is anchored by the Tesco supermarket and the Japanese embassy is located in the centre.

The centre was once home to one of the last remaining Quinnsworth stores owned by Peter Quinn of Nutley Lane. In the late 1990s, the centre underwent a renovation and a Tesco Ireland store was opened.

A free underground car park is provided, with about a quarter of the spaces reserved for office workers.

The Tony Walsh pharmacy was used in the 2003 film Intermission, but filmed to look as if it were outdoors.
