= Aircoach =

Irish commercial intercity bus company

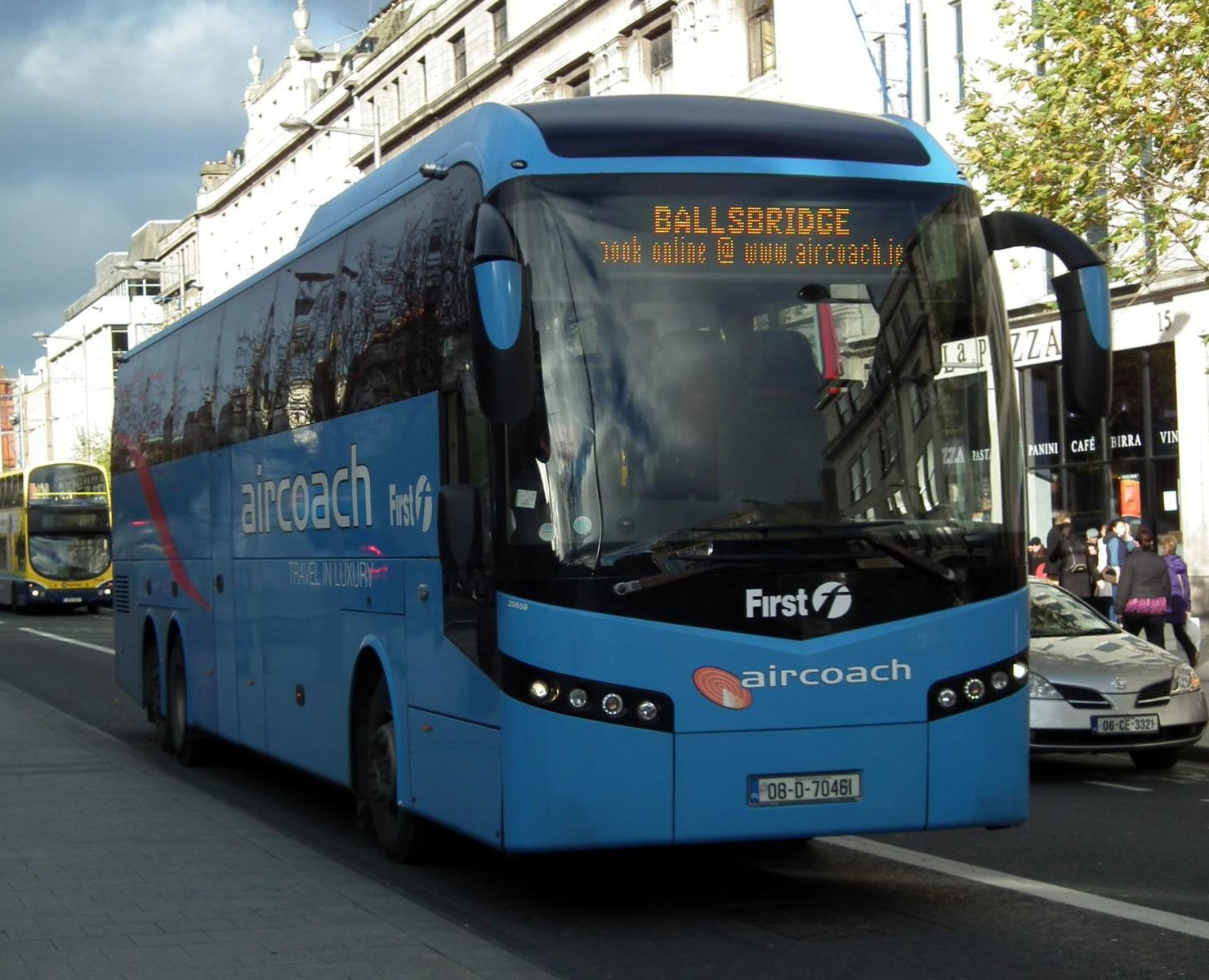
- Aircoach bus in Dublin
- Parent: FirstGroup
- Founded: 1999
- Headquarters: Dublin
- Routes: 5
- Destinations: Dublin Airport; Cork; Dublin; Leopardstown; Belfast; Killiney; Derry; Belfast International
- Hubs: Cork, Belfast, Dublin, Derry
- Fleet: 64
- Managing Director: Kim Swann
- Website: www.aircoach.ie

First Bus Ireland Limited trading as Aircoach is an Ireland-based subsidiary company of FirstGroup. It provides airport express coach services from Cork, Belfast, Derry, Southside Dublin and Dublin to Dublin Airport and from Derry to Belfast International Airport.

It also operates car park and staff shuttles for Dublin Airport and other private hire contracts in the Dublin area, including services for Leinster Rugby and the Football Association of Ireland.

== History ==
Aircoach was formed in 1999 by John O'Sullivan, a former Bus Éireann employee. O'Sullivan sold 90% of the company to FirstGroup in 2003 for €15 million before selling the remaining 10% for €1.5 million to FirstGroup in 2005.

Aircoach was awarded the Overall Logistics and Transport Excellence Award at the 2011 Irish Logistics and Transport Awards. The company was also named Irish Inter-City coach operator of the year at the 2014 Fleet Bus and Coach awards, and Airport coach operator of the year in 2020.

In addition to its scheduled services, Aircoach also operates shuttle bus services at Dublin Airport along with contract services and is the 'official coach supplier' to the Leinster Rugby team and the Football Association of Ireland.

In October 2022, Aircoach acquired the Derry-based transport company Airporter. The Airporter, which provided a shuttle service between Derry and Belfast International and Belfast City Airports, announced in 2009 that its fleet would provide the first free wifi service on-board any coach fleet in Northern Ireland. Following the acquisition of Airporter, Aircoach expanded its reach to service Belfast International Airport and Derry in January 2023.

== Routes ==
Current routes, as of 3 June 2025
Route	Origin	Terminus	Notes
700	Leopardstown	Dublin Airport	Via Stillorgan, UCD, Donnybrook, Leeson St, O'Connell St, and Drumcondra
700X	O'Connell St	Dublin Airport	Via Drumcondra
702	Dalkey	Dublin Airport	Via Dún Laoghaire, Blackrock, Ballsbridge & Port Tunnel
704X	Cork (Lower Glanmire Road)	Dublin Airport	Via Dublin City (Bachelor's Walk / Aston Quay)
705X	O'Connell Street	Derry (Foyleside Coach Park)	Via Dublin Airport, Belfast (Glengall St), Belfast International Airport, Maghera and Drumahoe

=== Former services ===
The first Aircoach route, the 701 Ballsbridge to Dublin Airport, was suspended after 14 years of operation in April 2013. Many of the stops on this service continue to be served by the 700 Leopardstown route, with the stops unique to the Ballsbridge service being amalgamated into the 702 Greystones and 703 Killiney/Dalkey routes.

A service from Ballinteer to Dublin Airport ran from April 2011 until December 2012, whilst the company also previously ran stopping commuter services to Belfast (2004-2010), Cork (2004-2012) and Portlaoise (2004-2006) to/from Dublin City and Dublin Airport.

Service 706/706x from Galway to Dublin City and Dublin Airport via Ballinasloe, Athlone and Maynooth commenced in July 2021 following the cancellation of Bus Éireann service X20. However the service was withdrawn in April 2024 with the company stating they were unable to make the 706/706x commercially viable.

On 30 June 2024, Route 703 was scrapped, with the service being amalgamated into Route 702 to Greystones and operating hourly. Route 700 was extended to Cherrywood from Leopardstown at a reduced frequency of every 30 minutes. Route 702 largely followed the old 703 route to Dalkey before heading to Greystones, while prior to this, it operated along the N11 from Booterstown. Route 701, operating every 30 minutes to Ballbridge via Dublin City Centre, was reintroduced on the same day.

The network was changed again in February 2025. The extension of route 700 to Cherrywood was scrapped, whilst route 701 was renamed the 700X and had its operating hours cut back with the route now operating between Dublin Airport and Dublin City centre only. Route 702 saw the section between Dalkey and Greystones cut. This meant Aircoach no longer serviced Greystones after 17 years of service. The company claimed that this was due to declining passenger numbers but stakeholder groups stated that merging the former 702 and 703 services together created a cumbersome route which made the service unattractive.

The Phoenix Park shuttle ran from May 2008 until January 2010 using East Lancs Myllennium buses which were powered by LPG.

== Fleet ==
The coach fleet consists of 34 Plaxton Panther bodied Volvo B11R coaches built between 2014 and 2020, 5 Mercedes-Benz Tourismo vehicles which were delivered in 2023. and 8 Irizar i6 coaches delivered in 2025.

The bus fleet consists of 17 12.9m Volvo B8RLE MCV Evoras delivered in 2023 which are used across the portfolio of Dublin Airport car park and staff shuttles services.

In August 2026, 7 additional Alexander Dennis Enviro400 Citys were added to the fleet for use on the 700x after being withdrawn from airport services in Glasgow, Scotland. Aircoach reported these would boost capacity on these services between the City Centre & Dublin Airport.

== See also ==
- List of bus operators of the United Kingdom
