= Dublin 4 =

Dublin 4 (D4) Baile Átha Cliath 4
- Postal district
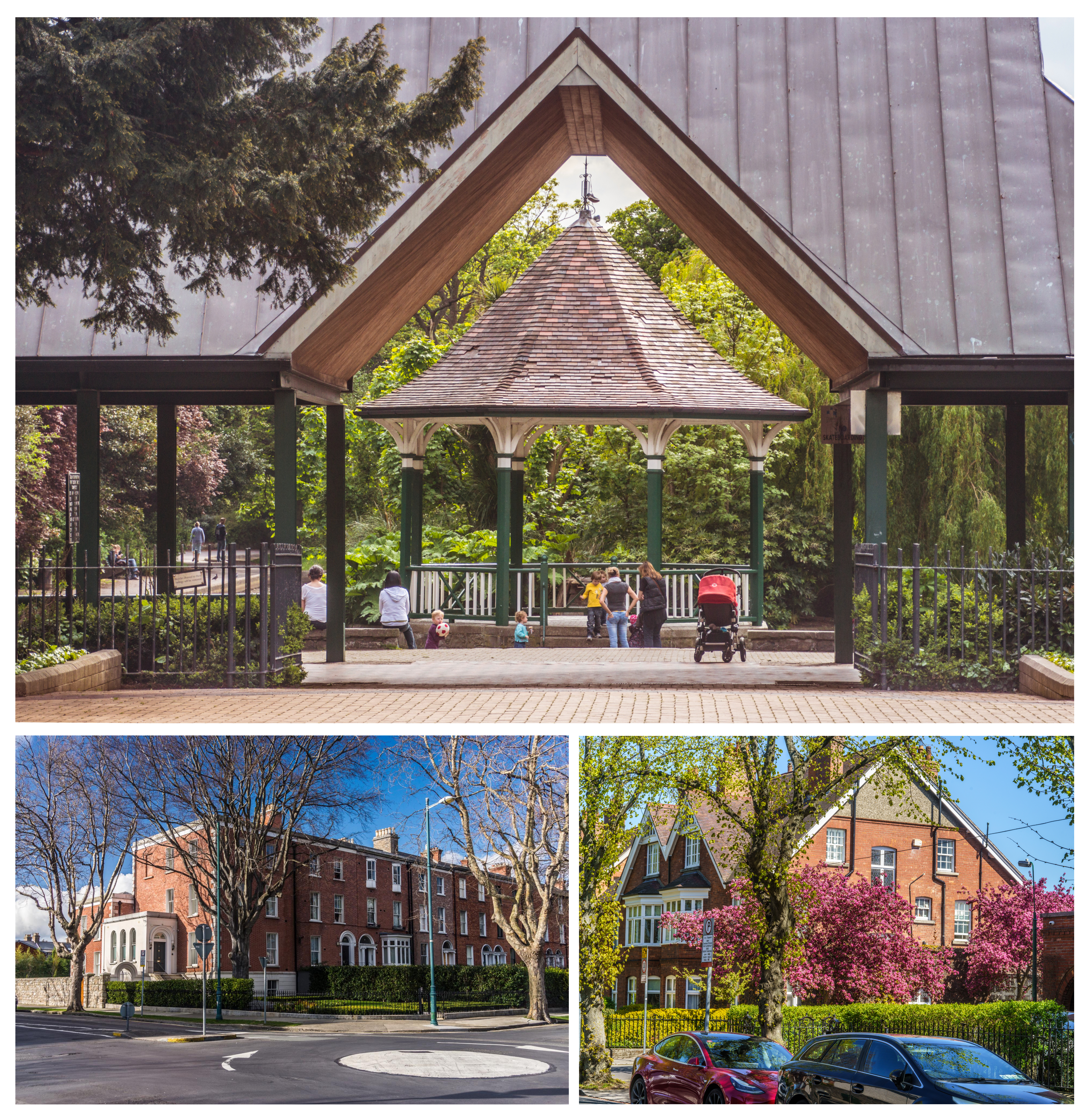
- Dublin 4 has long been considered one of Dublin's most prestigious districts

- Location in Ireland
- Coordinates: 53.3289°N 6.2305°W
- Country: Ireland
- Province: Leinster
- Local authority: Dublin City Council (small part in Dún Laoghaire–Rathdown County Council)
- Dáil constituency: Dublin Bay South
- EU Parliament: Dublin
- Postal district(s): D4/D04
- Dialing code: 01, +353 1

Dublin 4, also rendered as D4 and D04, is a postal district of Dublin, Ireland including Baggot Street Upper, the southernmost fringes of the Dublin Docklands, and the suburbs of Ballsbridge, Donnybrook, Irishtown, Merrion, Ringsend (including South Lotts and parts of Grand Canal Dock) and Sandymount, on the Southside of Dublin. Most of the area was known as Pembroke until 1930 when it was absorbed by the City of Dublin.

The headquarters of the national broadcaster RTÉ, the RDS, Merrion Centre, University College Dublin, Aviva Stadium, Google and a number of foreign embassies to Ireland are all located in Dublin 4.

It is Ireland's most expensive postcode. At the height of the Celtic Tiger economic boom, Shrewsbury Road in D4 was the sixth most expensive street in the world, with one property on the street selling for €58 million. As of 2022, the average property price in the district was almost €1 million.

== Popular culture ==
Dublin 4 or its abbreviation, D4, is sometimes used as a pejorative adjective to describe Dublin's upper-middle class based on the perceived characteristics of residents of this area. However, it sometimes also used to refer to the Irish upper middle class in general, regardless of whether or not they live in the D4 area. In this sense the term signifies a set of attitudes said to be in opposition to those held by "the plain people of Ireland" by Irish commentators such as Desmond Fennell.

While the area has, for most of its existence, been seen as well-to-do, the use of the term D4 as an adjective emerged in the 1990s. The fictional jock Ross O'Carroll-Kelly was meant as a caricature of this.

The term has been used to describe the aspirational upper middle-class from south Dublin and also used by Fianna Fáil members who like to portray themselves as being on the side of "the plain people of Ireland".

Maeve Binchy's book, Dublin 4, contains a series of short stories set in the area.

=== Accent ===
A change in accent occurred between those born roughly before 1970 and those born in the early 1970s or later.

In the early 1980s, a group of people in Dublin 4 developed a different accent, partly in rejection of older views of Irishness. This form of Dublin accent was known as "Dublin 4", "Dartspeak" or later "DORTspeak/Formers Morket" (after the Dublin 4 pronunciation of DART, which runs through the area). It has also been noticed that people who move into the area and parts of south Dublin from outside the county and who would normally speak in their native accent develop the DORT accent. The accent quickly became the subject of ridicule.

== Quotes ==
Two examples of "Dublin 4" being used to refer to alleged wealth:

The area desperately needs the retention of this kind of local community hospital. It covers Dublin 2, 4 and 6 and, because of the writings of a journalist who hails from the west but has chosen to live in Dublin, the connotation Dublin 4 has a very salubrious image which suggests considerable affluence. The reality is that many of the population in the catchment area of this hospital are not affluent.

— Ruairi Quinn, Dáil Éireann Debate, 21 May 1987

The Minister is probably aware that, not far from here, is the mythical place called Dublin 4. In our vision of Dublin 4 we think of Shrewsbury Road, Donnybrook and people who have access to power and money. As Eoghan Harris said, it is almost a state of mind. However, there is another part of Dublin 4, which I know very well, where there is 70 per cent unemployment, drug problems and deprivation. We do not hear much about that part of Dublin 4.

— John Gormley, Dáil Éireann Debate, 28 January 1999

Sometimes the antonym plain people of Ireland or plain people was contrasted with it:

One of the difficulties with modern newspapers is that there is an increasing tendency to portray opinions as facts. This is particularly evident in the Sunday Independent. If one tries to find news in it, apart from the lead story which itself is sometimes not news, one finds a preponderance of articles from self-proclaimed experts who tend to be from middle class backgrounds – dare I say Dublin 4 types, which is a state of mind rather than a geographic location. These articles tend to reflect the attitudes of a particular section of society and regard those attitudes as dominant. There does not appear to be a balance in the attitudes represented by the newspaper. However, the plain people have enough sense to sift out what is good and what is bad. Frequently, the attitudes represented by the newspaper do not reflect the attitudes dominant within the country as a whole, but thankfully, the plain people have enough good sense to resist them.

— John Dardis, Seanad Éireann Debate, 9 February 2005

== Usage in Dublin addresses ==
The postal district forms the first part of numerous seven digit Eircodes that are unique to every single address in the area. For addressing purposes, it appears in both its original form as Dublin 4 and as the first part of a seven digit postal code as D04 a line below. For example:

The Embassy of Switzerland
6 Ailesbury Road
Dublin 4
D04 W205

=== Gallery ===
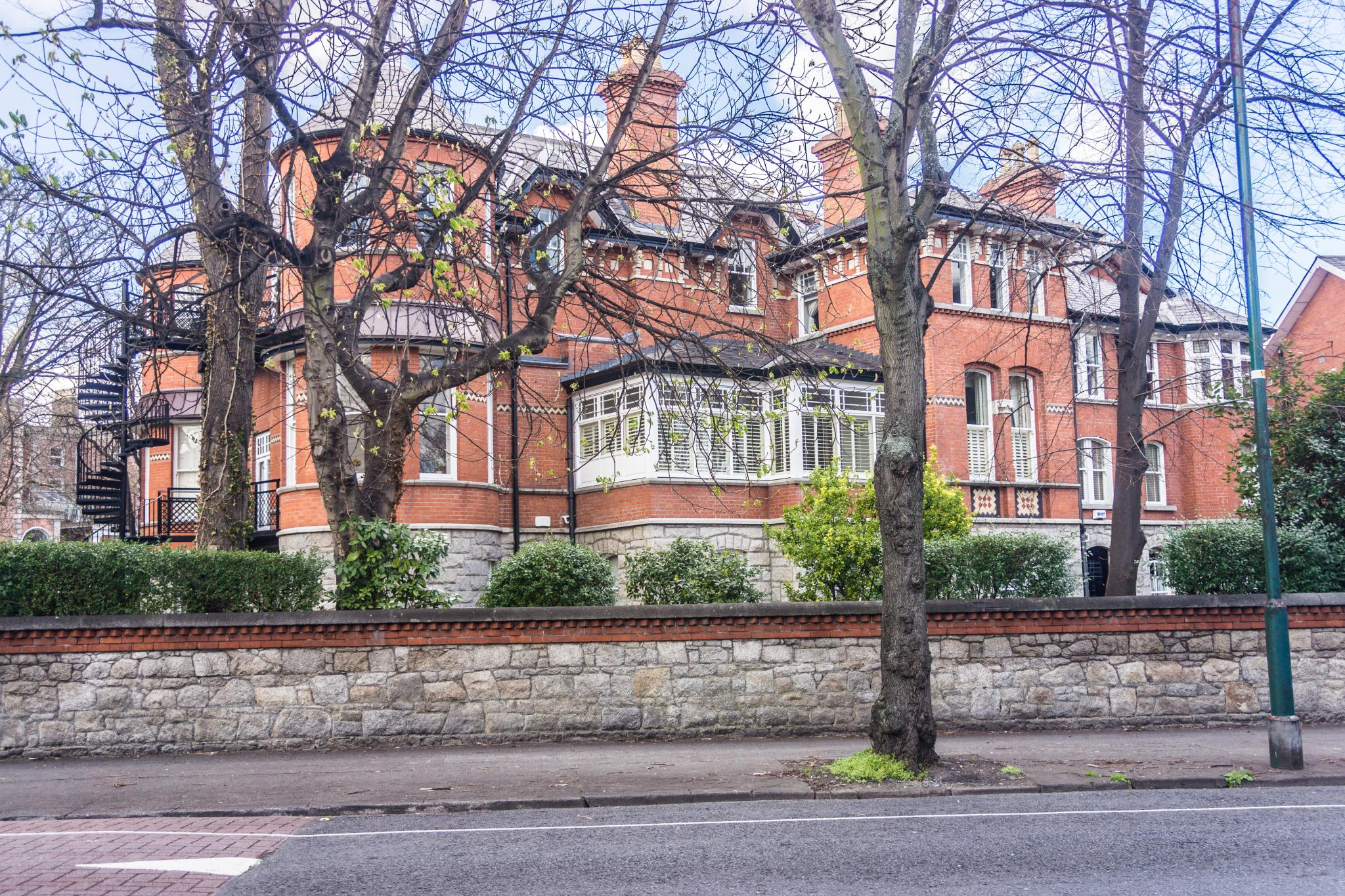
An Edwardian-era home on Clyde Road, D4.

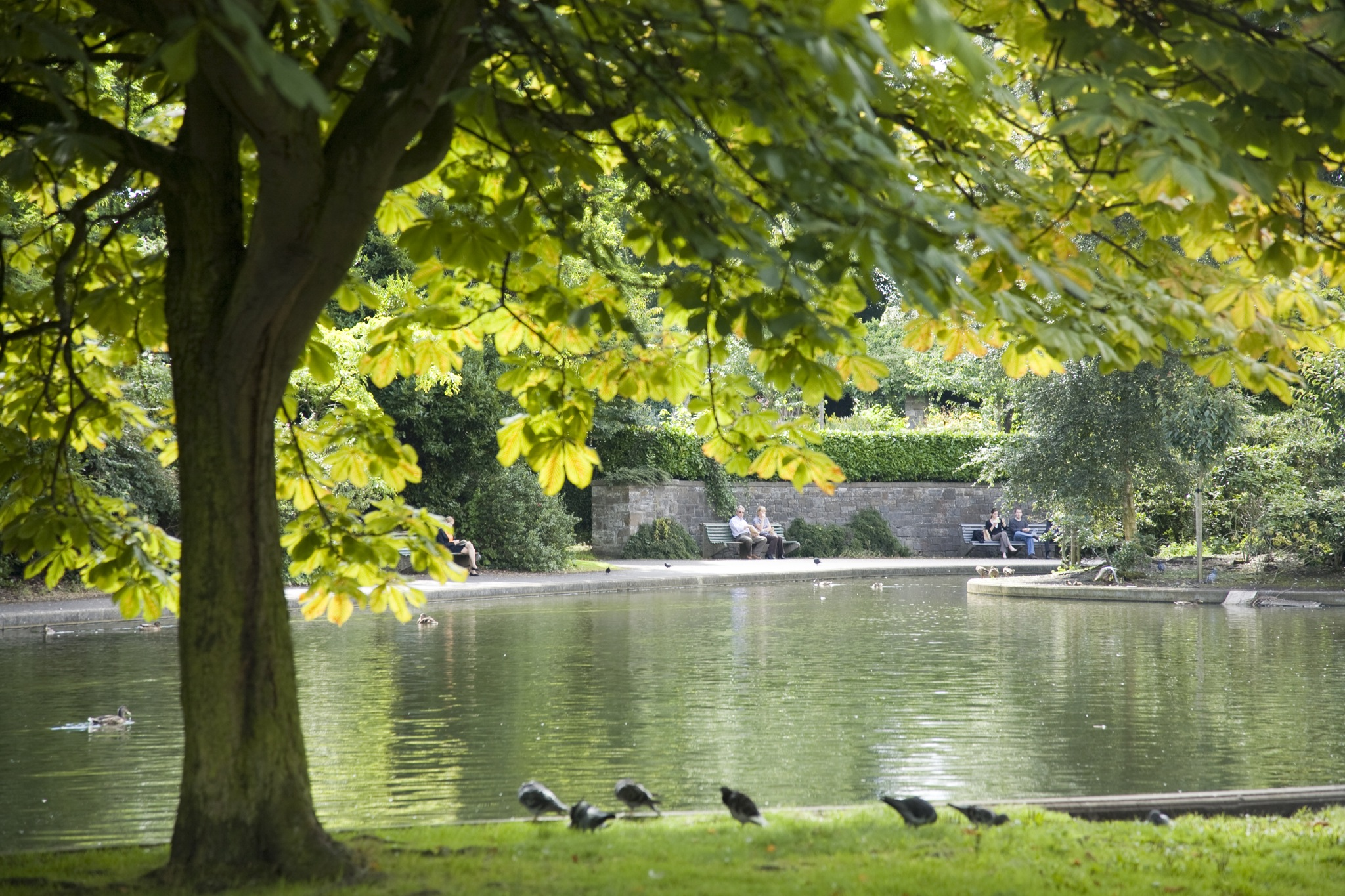
Herbert Park, Ballsbridge, D4

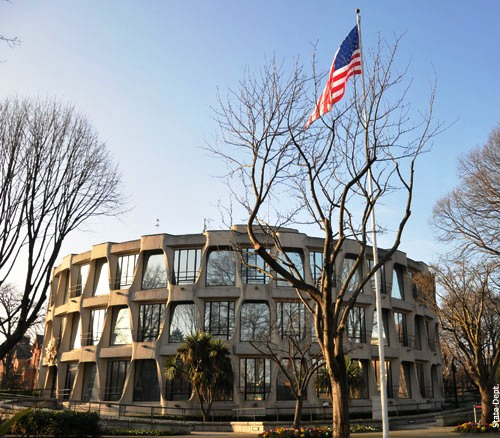
The US embassy to Ireland is located in D4.

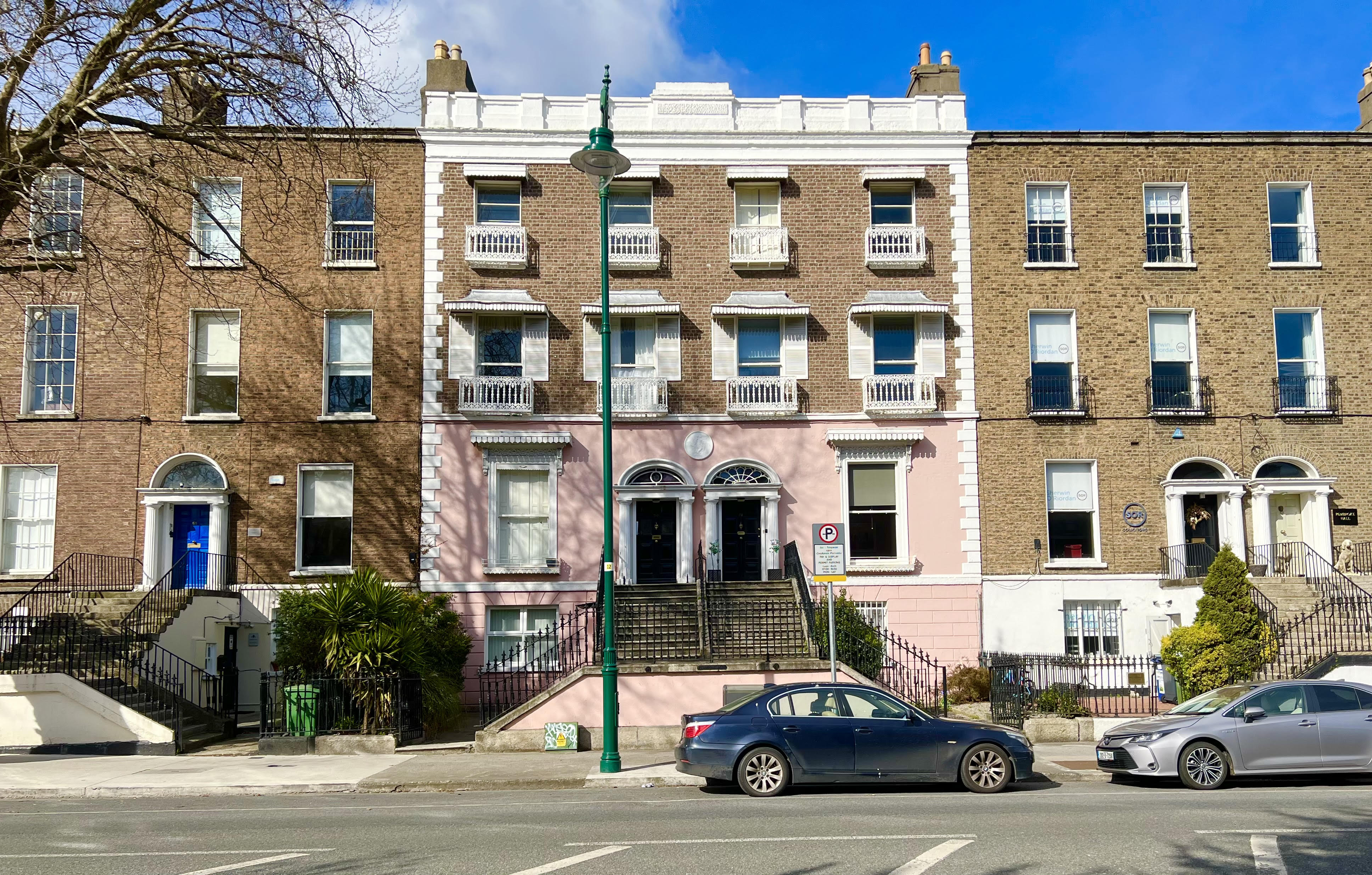
The decorative frontage of large D4 townhouses

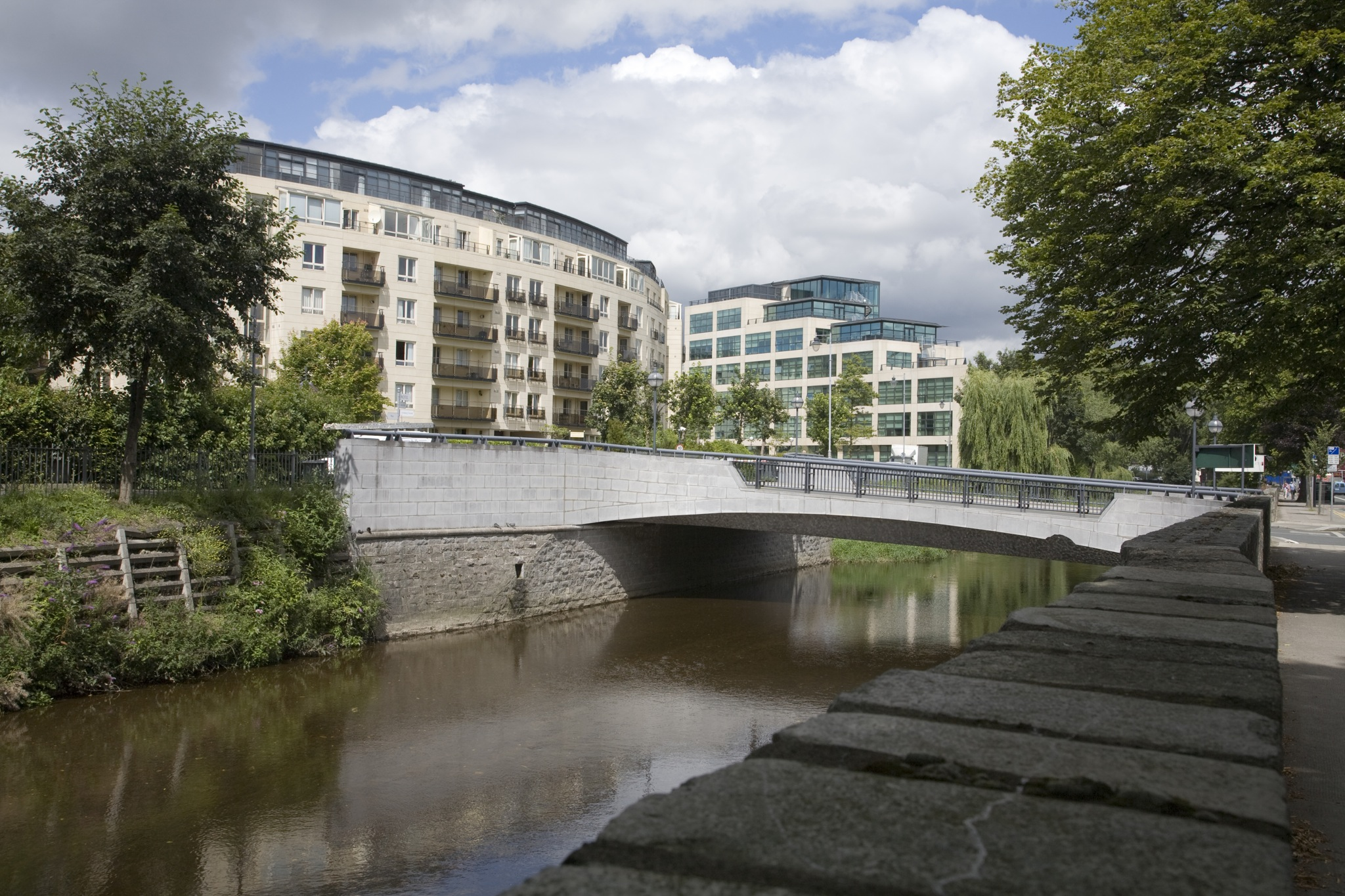
Apartments near the River Dodder

== See also ==
- List of Eircode routing areas in Ireland
