= Alice King =

Alice King may refer to:

- Alice King (novelist) (1839-1894), British novelist
- Alice Gertrude King Kleberg (1862–1944), daughter of Richard King (entrepreneur) and wife of Robert Justus Kleberg, Jr.
- Alice King, later Alice Ginnell (1882-1967), Irish republican activist
- Alice Ross-King (1887–1968), Australian civilian and military nurse
- Alice King Chatham (1908–1989), American sculptor
- Alice Gore King (1914–2007), American women's rights activist, educator, writer, and artist
- Alice M. King (1930–2008), American children's activist and former first lady of New Mexico
- Birei Kin (born 1934), Taiwanese-born Japanese activist
