= Raglan Road, Dublin =

Road in Dublin, Ireland

Raglan Road
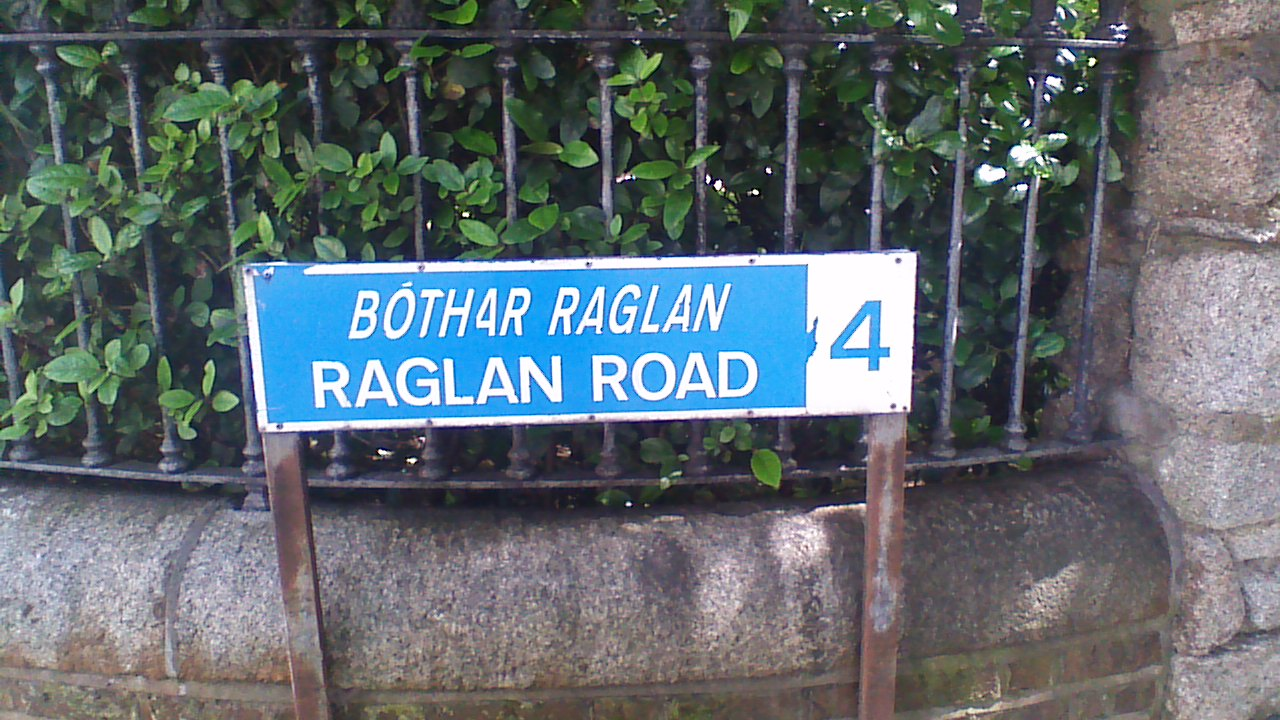
- Sign with Dublin 4 post code

- Location within Dublin Location within Ireland
- Native name: Bóthar Raglan (Irish)
- Namesake: FitzRoy Somerset, 1st Baron Raglan
- Length: 390 m (1,280 ft)
- Width: 17 metres (56 ft)
- Location: Ballsbridge, Dublin, Ireland
- Postal code: D04
- Coordinates: 53.3303°N 6.2382°W
- north end: Pembroke Road
- south end: Clyde Road

Construction
- Inauguration: 1857

Other
- Known for: Poem "On Raglan Road"; Embassies

Raglan Road (Irish: Bóthar Raglan) is a road running between Pembroke Road and Clyde Road in Ballsbridge, Dublin 4, Ireland.

It is the setting of Patrick Kavanagh's poem "On Raglan Road".

== History ==
The road came into existence in 1857, on the conclusion of peace after the Crimean War, and was named after Lord Raglan (Fitzroy Somerset 1788–1855), the first Chief Commander in that war. Nearby Elgin and Clyde Roads, which commemorate James Bruce, Earl of Elgin, and Colin Campbell, Lord Clyde, both died 1863, were opened in 1863–64 (Campbell fought in the Indian Rebellion of 1857; Bruce was Viceroy of India, 1862–63).

Towards the later end of the 19th century, Raglan Road and the surrounding township of Pembroke became the new residential home of the Anglo-Irish aristocracy. During the 18th and mid 19th centuries the Irish upper classes had maintained Dublin homes in the Georgian squares of the city, such as Fitzwilliam and Merrion squares on Dublin's Southside. However, the further expansion of Dublin in the 1850s lead to new residences being created. These roads, such as Raglan Road, boasted a position further away from the street and had large gardens. This new style of housing began to draw the aristocracy to the area. However, a reasonable number of families chose to maintain their Georgian homes in Dublin, most of these were in the areas surrounding either Fitzwilliam Square or Merrion Square.

=== Notable Visitors ===
Queen Victoria stayed at De Wyndsore House (14 Raglan Road) during her 1900 Visit to Ireland. The property was then in the possession of the Duckett family, of Duckett's Grove.

Former US President Bill Clinton and his wife Hillary visited Raglan Road twice. Both in 2007 and in August 2014, high-profile fundraisers were held at the private residence of solicitors Brian Farren and Linda O'Shea Farren at 37 Raglan Road. The most recent fundraiser for Hillary Clinton was held in anticipation of her running for the US presidency in 2016. Nearly 100 guests attended the event, with tickets costing either $1,000 or $5,000. About $50,000 (€39,000) was raised.

== Property ==
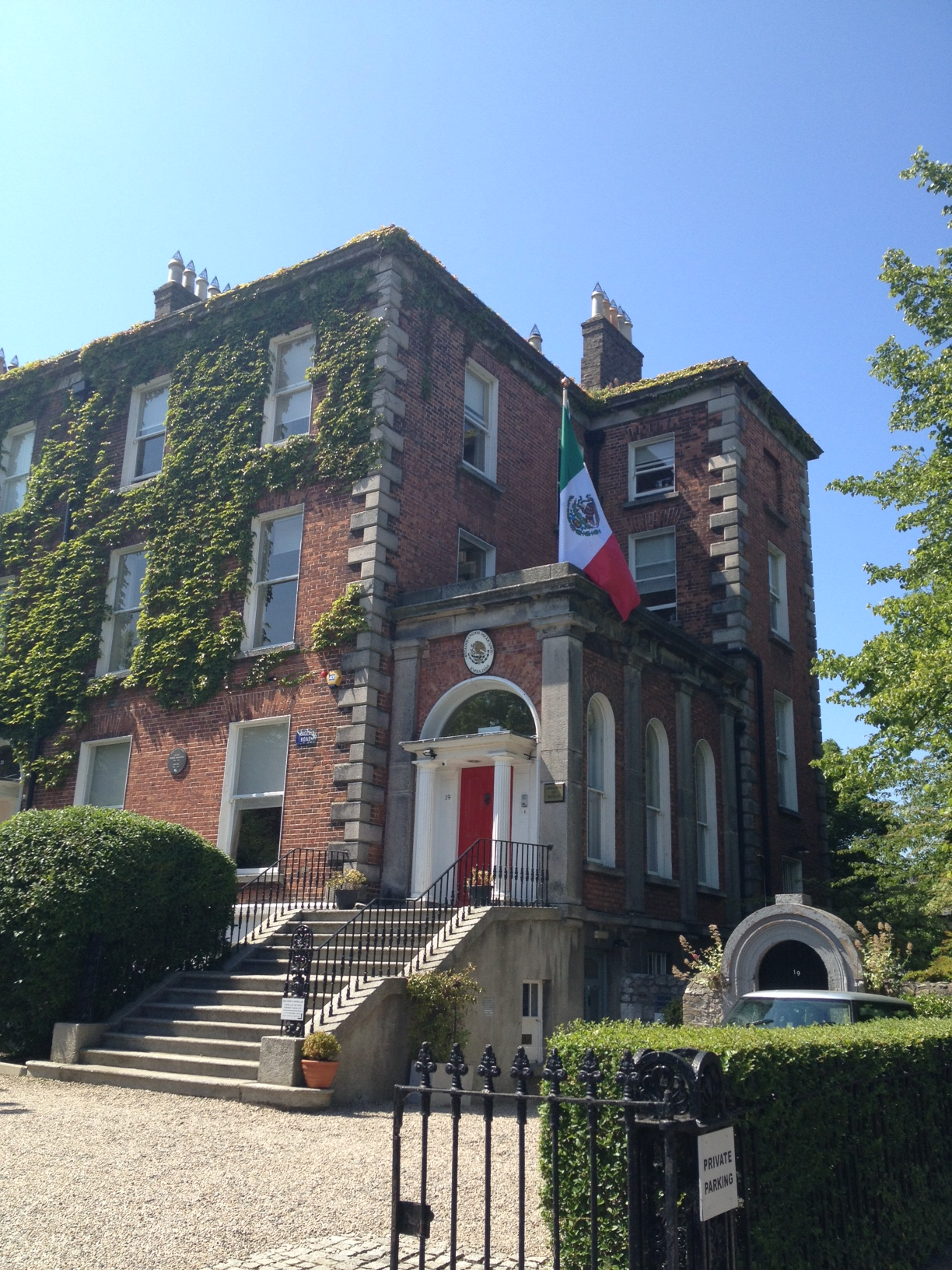
Mexican embassy, Raglan Road

Raglan Road is one of Dublin's most expensive residential roads and contains notable examples of Victorian houses. As of June 2014, the most expensive rental property in Ireland was 17 Raglan Road with a rent of €15,000 per month. The road is notable for its listed early Victorian and Edwardian mansions. The embassies of Turkey, Morocco, Colombia, and Mexico are located on Raglan Road.

== Notable residents ==
- Sir Charles Cameron, physician
- Sir Malby Crofton, Bt., Deputy Lord Lieutenant of Sligo
- Augusta Crofton Dillon, photographer
- Lady Maria Georgina Duckett
- Seán Dunne, financier
- Dermot Gleeson, AIB Chairman
- Patrick Kavanagh, poet
- Denis O'Brien, businessman and billionaire
- Michael O'Leary, CEO Ryanair
- FitzRoy Somerset, 1st Baron Raglan, British Army officer

== See also ==
- List of streets and squares in Dublin
