= 1899 Queen's County Council election =

Local election in Ireland

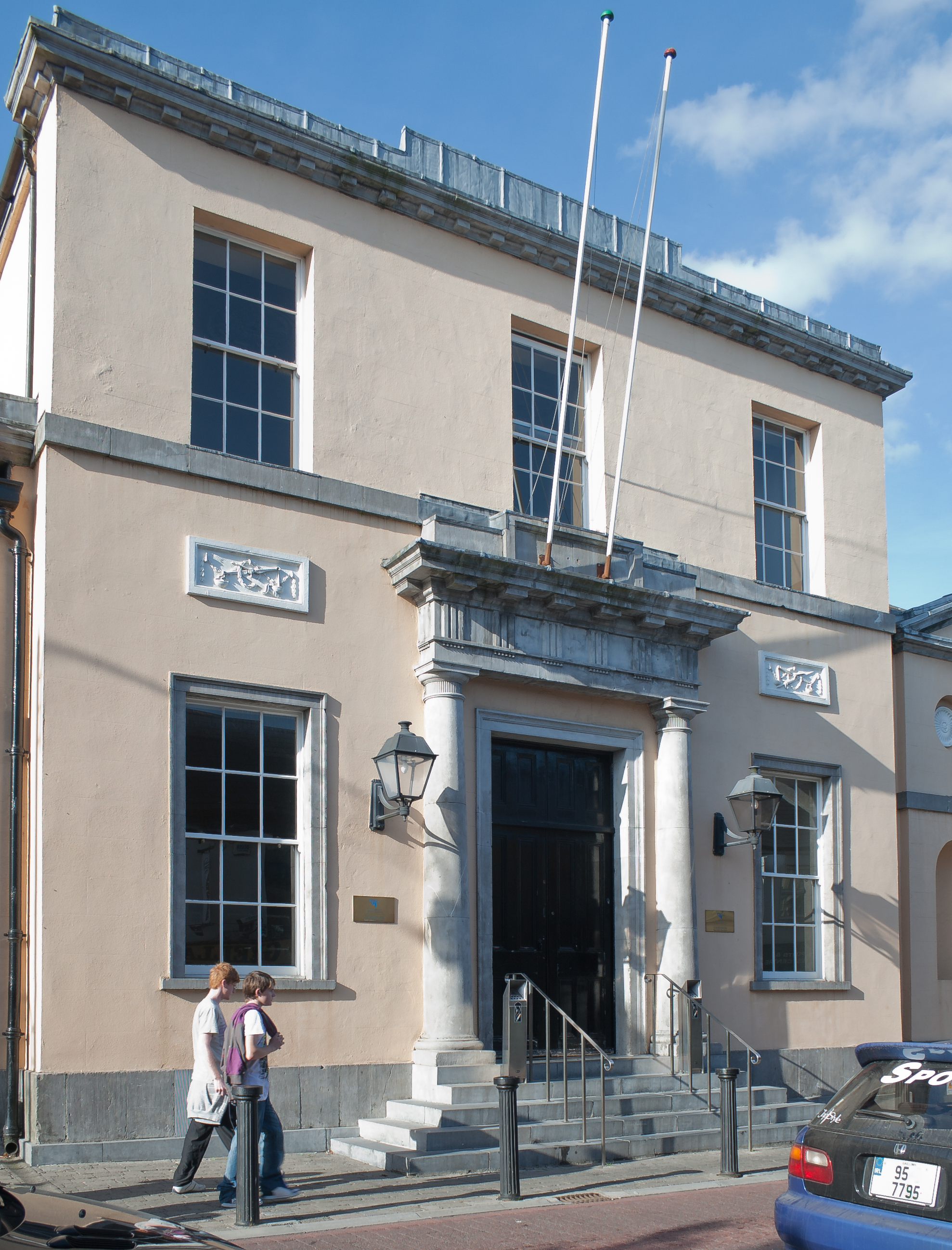
Queen's County Courthouse, site of the inaugural meeting of the county council

Queen's County Council (now Laois County Council) was created in 1899 under the Local Government (Ireland) Act 1898 and the first local elections for the county council, and the councils of the five rural districts within Queen's County, were held on 6 April 1899, simultaneous with elections in the other administrative counties. The first Queen's County Council comprised 32 councillors serving a three-year term:

- 22 elected, one from each of the 22 county districts
- five rural district council chairmen, ex officio
- three nominees of the outgoing county grand jury, the unelected county government prior to the 1898 act
- two members co-opted by the other members at the council's first meeting on 22 April 1899

== Councillors ==
Queen's County Council election 1899
County district	Councillor	Notes
Abbeyleix	William Phelan	
Arless	John Byrne	
Ballinakill	Patrick Brennan	Not the Newtown district representative
Ballybrittas	Denis Boland	
Borris-in-Ossory	Laurence Thomas Kelly	Vice chairman
Castletown	Arthur McMahon	Not the Abbeyleix RDC chairman
Clonaslee	John Treacy	
Coolrain	Michael Fitzpatrick	
Cullenagh	James McMahon	
Donaghmore	Bernard FitzPatrick, 2nd Baron Castletown	
Durrow	Patrick O'Flanagan	
Emo	John Williams	
Luggacurren	Thomas Breen	
Maryborough	Patrick A. Meehan	Chairman. Maryborough is now Portlaoise
Mountmellick	William McEvoy	
Mountrath	John Dowling	
Newtown	Patrick Brennan	Not the Ballinakill district representative
O'Moresforest	Patrick Doran	
Portarlington South	Charles Bannon	
Rathdowney	Daniel Quigley	
Stradbally	Denis Shaughnessy	
Tinnahinch	William Dunne	

Additional Queen's County councillors 1899
Type	Rural district	Name	Notes
RDC chairman	Abbeyleix	Arthur McMahon	Not the Castletown district representative
RDC chairman	Athy No. 2	Thomas Timmins	
RDC chairman	Carlow No. 2	Matthias McWey	
RDC chairman	Mountmellick	James Dunne	
RDC chairman	Roscrea No. 3	Thomas Lowry	
Grand jury	—	Robert Cosby	Of Stradbally Hall
Grand jury	—	Henry Charles White	Of "Charleville", Roscrea
Grand jury	—	Edmund Dease	
Co-opted	—	James Joseph Aird	Auctioneer and merchant in Maryborough; father of William Aird.
Co-opted	—	James Conroy	

== Results by district ==
Coolrain
Name	Votes	Notes
Michael Fitzpatrick	186	Labourers' support
E. Conroy	184	Catholic clergy support
C. P. Hamilton	24	
