= 1899 Irish local elections =

- January & March 1899

All councillors across Ireland
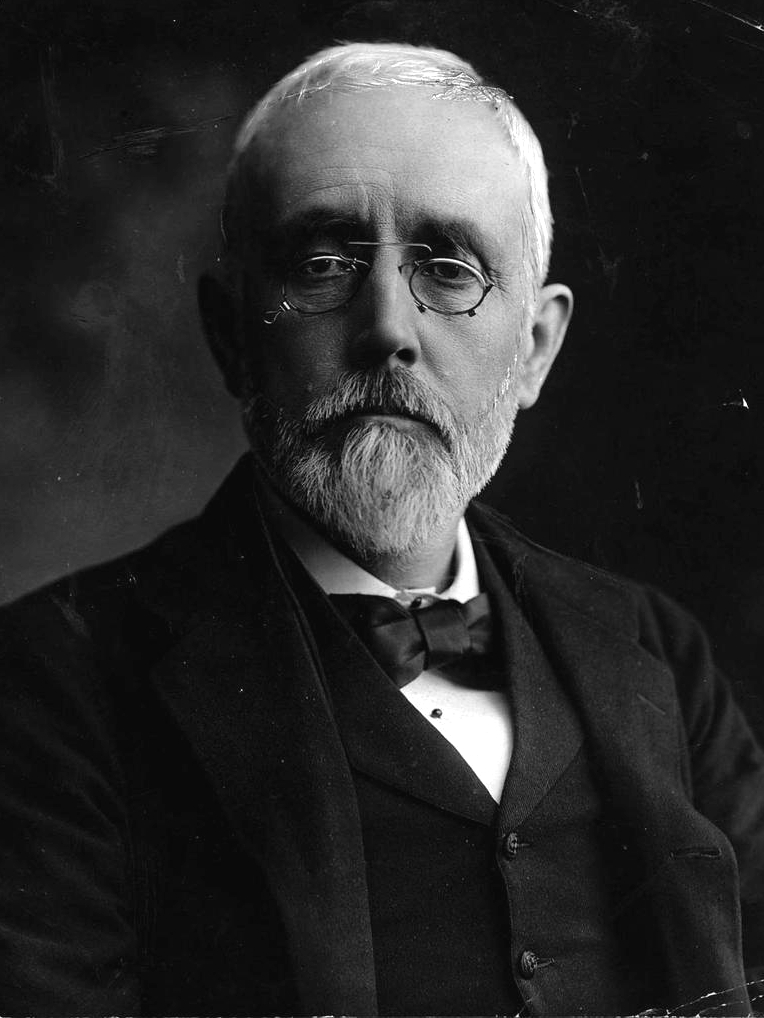

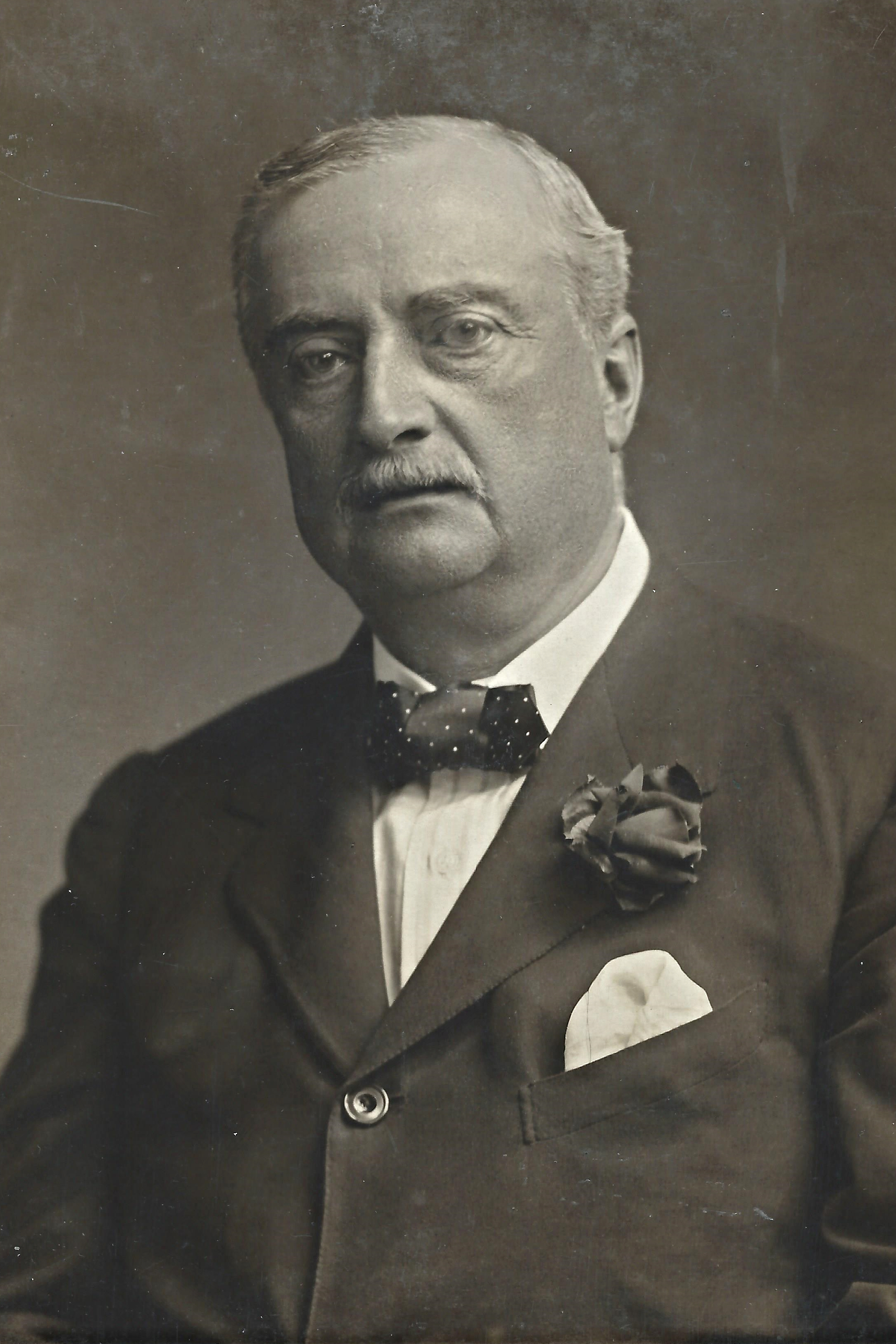

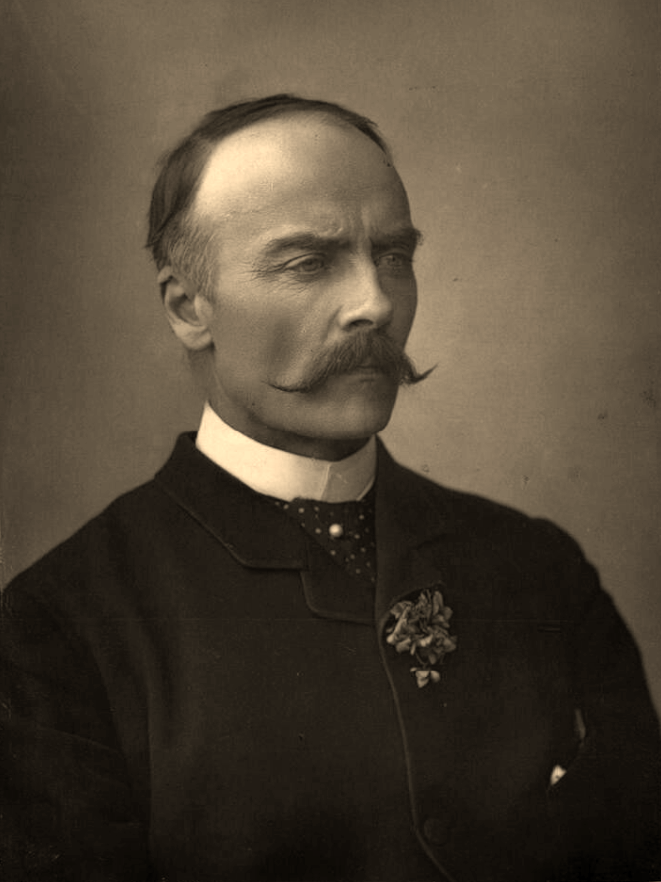

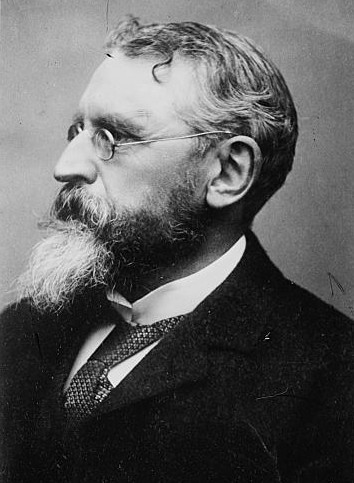
	First party	Second party	Third party
Leader	John Dillon	John Redmond	Edward James Saunderson
Party	Irish; National; Federation	Irish; National; League	Irish; Unionist; Alliance
	Fourth party	Fifth party
		Labour
Leader	William O'Brien	No national leadership
Party	United; Irish; League	Labour; Electoral; Association
- Map showing control by county council, and affiliation of county councillors

The 1899 Irish local elections were the first local elections following the reorganisation of Irish local government caused by the Local Government (Ireland) Act 1898. The 1898 Act had changed the nature of Irish local governance, replacing the unrepresentative grand jury system, and making local government more democratic and representative. As a result, the 1899 election saw the traditional Unionist Landowning class, which had previously dominated much of Irish local politics, being replaced by a newer nationalist representation. Ulster's local government, however, remained Unionist in political outlook.

The elections also saw the expansion of Labour representation. In the 1898 elections, only Ulster had Unionist and unaligned Labourite Councillors. Following the election however the overall Labour representation increased to 303. Of these 303, 218 were nationalists (affiliated to an IPP faction), whilst 56 were extremist (with links to the IRB). There were 14 Unionist Labourites in Ulster, 4 in Munster, 2 in Leinster, 1 in Connaught, but none in Dublin.

They were held in two stages; Urban area local elections in January 1899 and Rural areas in March 1899

== Detailed results ==
=== County Councils ===
Authority	UIL	LEA	U	Ind	Other	Total	Result	Details
Antrim			21			21	Irish Unionist	Details
Armagh			9		7	16	Irish Unionist	Details
Carlow			1		18	19	Irish Nationalist	Details
Cavan					20	20	Irish Nationalist	Details
Clare					20	20	Irish Nationalist	Details
Cork					32	32	Irish Nationalist	Details
Donegal			2		18	20	Irish Nationalist	Details
Down			15		6	21	Irish Unionist	Details
Dublin County			6		14	20	Irish Nationalist	Details
Fermanagh			10		10	20	No overall control	Details
Galway						20	Irish Nationalist	Details
Kerry						21	Irish Nationalist	Details
Kildare	0	0	3	1	17	21	Irish Nationalist	Details
Kilkenny			1		17	18	Irish Nationalist	Details
Queen's County (Laois)			1		21	22	Irish Nationalist	Details
Leitrim					18	18	Irish Nationalist	Details
Limerick							Irish Nationalist	Details
Londonderry							Irish Unionist	Details
Longford							Irish Nationalist	Details
Louth			1		23	24	Irish Nationalist	Details
Mayo							Irish Nationalist	Details
Meath							Irish Nationalist	Details
Monaghan			1	1	17	19	Irish Nationalist	Details
King's County (Offaly)		1	1	2	17	21	Irish Nationalist	Details
Roscommon							Irish Nationalist	Details
Sligo							Irish Nationalist	Details
Tipperary							Irish Nationalist	Details
Tyrone			10		10	20	No overall control	Details
Waterford							Irish Nationalist	Details
Westmeath							Irish Nationalist	Details
Wexford							Irish Nationalist	Details
Wicklow							Irish Nationalist	Details
Totals			113		546	659		

=== Borough Councils ===
Authority	UIL	LEA	U	Ind	Other	Total	Result	Details
Belfast						12		Details
Cork								Details
Dublin	27	8	7	0	18	60	Irish Nationalist	Details
Limerick		24			16	40	LEA	Details
Londonderry								Details
Waterford								Details
Totals								

=== District Councils ===
Authority	UIL	LEA	U	Ind	Other	Total	Result	Details	County	District type
Armagh UD								Details	Armagh	Urban District
Castlebar UD	6			6			No overall control	Details	Mayo	Urban District
Kilrush UD								Details	Clare	Urban District
Derry No. 1 RD								Details	Londonderry	Rural District
Derry No. 2 RD								Details	Londonderry	Rural District
Blackrock UD								Details	Dublin	Urban District
Clontarf UD								Details	Dublin	Urban District
Dalkey UD								Details	Dublin	Urban District
Drumcondra, Cloniffe and Glasnevin UD								Details	Dublin	Urban District
Killiney and Ballybrack UD								Details	Dublin	Urban District
Kingstown UD	5	0	16	0	0	21	Irish Unionist	Details	Dublin	Urban District
New Kilmainham UD								Details	Dublin	Urban District
Pembroke UD	0	0	0	16	0	16	Independent	Details	Dublin	Urban District
Rathmines and Rathgar UD	0	0	0	0				Details	Dublin	Urban District
Dublin South RD								Details	Dublin	Rural District
Galway UD								Details	Galway	Urban District
Sligo UD								Details	Sligo	Urban District
Totals						1,806				
