= 1899 Pembroke Urban District Council election =

1899 Irish local government election

An election to the Pembroke Urban District Council took place on Monday 16 January 1899 as part of that year's Irish local elections.

Unlike some of the elections elsewhere in Ireland, the election was not explicitly contested on Nationalist/Unionist grounds. Instead, the election largely saw a new group of 'Ratepayers' candidates, together with several Independents, challenge the incumbent Town Commissioners and their allies on their historic administration of the district.

The result saw Nationalists elected to the council for the first time.

Following the election Sir Robert Jackson was elected chairman, replacing Col. Davoren.

== Results by party ==
Party	Seats	±	Votes	%	±%
Incumbents and Allies	9	▼3	10,574	52.42	
Ratepayers	5	▲5	7,622	37.79	
Independent	1	▲1	1,976	9.79	
Totals	15	0	20,172	100.00	—

== Ward Results ==
Pembroke (15 commissioners) Electorate:
Party	Candidate	Votes	%	±%
Pro-Incumbent	Sir Robert Jackson (incumbent)	1,472		
Ratepayers	John Coffey	1,244		
Ratepayers	Michael Cooney	1,134		
Ratepayers	John McBride	1,063		
Pro-Incumbent	John J. Cranny (incumbent)	1,012		
Pro-Incumbent	Andrew Vesey Davoren (incumbent)	1,008		
Independent	Samuel Worthington	1,003		
Pro-Incumbent	George W. Casson (incumbent)	949		
Pro-Incumbent	Daniel L. Ramsay	934		
Pro-Incumbent	George O. Carolin (incumbent)	918		
Pro-Incumbent	John Mooney Jr (incumbent)	846		
Ratepayers	John King	796		
Pro-Incumbent	Robert F. Lidwill (incumbent)	794		
Ratepayers	James Thompson	730		
Pro-Incumbent	Cornelius de Groot (incumbent)	714		
Ratepayers	Michael Newport	709		
Pro-Incumbent	John Gibbs (incumbent)	686		
Pro-Incumbent	John Gardner (incumbent)	680		
Ratepayers	John Francis Murphy	675		
Ratepayers	Francis Rooney	642		
Ratepayers	Christopher Downey	629		
Independent	George R. Goodfellow	624		
Pro-Incumbent	Arthur D. Pollen	561		
Independent	Loftus Lowcay Nuzum	349		
Turnout				
