= 1899 Donegal County Council election =

Local election in Ireland

The first election to Donegal County Council took place in April 1899 as part of that year's Irish local elections.

== Aggregate results ==
Donegal County Council election, 1899
Party	Seats	Gains	Losses	Net gain/loss	Seats %	Votes %	Votes	+/−
Irish Nationalist	18							
Irish Unionist	2							
Liberal	0							
Independent	0							

== Ward results ==
=== Annagry ===
Annagry
Party	Candidate	Votes	%	±%
	John Sweeney	945		
	Patrick Gallagher	576		
Majority		369		
Turnout				

=== Ballyshannon ===
Ballyshannon
Party	Candidate	Votes	%	±%
United Irish League	James David Condon	527	49.16	
Liberal	Michael Cassidy	478	44.59	
Irish Unionist	Robert Crawford	67	6.25	
Majority		49	4.57	
Turnout		1,072		
United Irish League win (new seat)				

=== Buncrana ===
Buncrana
Party	Candidate	Votes	%	±%
	W. Doherty	unopposed		

=== Burt ===
Burt
Party	Candidate	Votes	%	±%
Irish Unionist	William J. Hanna J.P.	700		
	James Fleming	588		
Majority		112		
Turnout				

=== Carndonagh ===
Carndonagh
Party	Candidate	Votes	%	±%
	M. White	unopposed		

=== Castlefin ===
Castlefin
Party	Candidate	Votes	%	±%
	William Gallagher J.P.	824		
	Captain William Knox D.L.	552		
Majority		272		
Turnout				

=== Churchhill ===
Churchhill
Party	Candidate	Votes	%	±%
	H. McLafferty	unopposed		

=== Donegal ===
Donegal
Party	Candidate	Votes	%	±%
	L. Dunleavy	unopposed		

=== Dunfanaghy ===
Dunfanaghy
Party	Candidate	Votes	%	±%
Irish Nationalist	Edward McFadden	838		
	Charles Frederick Stewart	92		
Majority		746		
Turnout				

=== Dungloe ===
Dungloe
Party	Candidate	Votes	%	±%
	J. Sweeney	unopposed		

=== Dunkineely ===
Dunkineely
Party	Candidate	Votes	%	±%
	Peter Ward	651		
	Patrick Gallagher	471		
Majority		180		
Turnout				

=== Glenties ===
Glenties
Party	Candidate	Votes	%	±%
	Hugh McDevitt	834		
	William McGroarty	452		
Majority		382		
Turnout				

=== Killybegs ===
Killybegs
Party	Candidate	Votes	%	±%
	John Byrne	963		
	Joseph Murrin	256		
Majority		707		
Turnout				

=== Letterkenny ===
Letterkenny
Party	Candidate	Votes	%	±%
	Manus McFadden J.P.	694		
Irish Unionist	John Robinson	546		
Majority		148		
Turnout				

=== Milford ===
Milford
Party	Candidate	Votes	%	±%
	H. McDevitte	unopposed		

=== Moville ===
Moville
Party	Candidate	Votes	%	±%
	J. Bradley	unopposed		

=== Pettigo ===
Pettigo
Party	Candidate	Votes	%	±%
	Daniel Joseph Flood	663		
	Thomas J. Atkinson	415		
	James Hamilton	93		
Majority		248		
Turnout				

=== Raphoe ===
Raphoe
Party	Candidate	Votes	%	±%
Irish Unionist	Captain Thomas Butler Stoney J.P.	584	44.1	
Irish Nationalist	Charles McCormick	412	31.1	
Independent Presbyterian	Samuel Marshall J.P.	329	24.8	
Majority		172	13.0	
Turnout		1,325		
Irish Unionist win (new seat)				

=== Rathmullen ===
Rathmullen
Party	Candidate	Votes	%	±%
	C. Kelly	unopposed		

=== Stranorlar ===
Stranorlar
Party	Candidate	Votes	%	±%
	Teague Magee J.P.	1,185		
	Captain John Riky J.P.	142		
Majority		1043		
Turnout				
