= 1920 Pembroke Urban District Council election =

1920 Irish local government election

An election to all 15 seats on Pembroke Urban District Council took place on Thursday 15 January 1920 as part of the 1920 Irish local elections. Pembroke was divided into two district electoral areas to elect councillors for a three-year term of office. This term was later extended to 1925.

Four candidates, including Dench (previously a nationalist councillor), and Forsyth (a Protestant Home Ruler, and the incumbent council chairman) ran on a Ratepayers Association ticket, which was silent on the national question. Along with keeping rates down, the grouping was committed to improved housing accommodation for the working classes, extending facilities to plotholders, better street lighting, the erection of a Free Carnegie Library, improved technical education, and providing wash houses where necessary.

== Results by party ==
Party	Seats	±	Candidates	1st pref	FPv%	±%
Irish Unionist	6	Steady	7			
Sinn Féin	6	▲	11			
Ratepayers	3		4			
Labour	0		4			
Independent	0		1			
Total	15		27	7,487	100%	—
Source: Irish Independent Turnout: 70.84%

== Results by local electoral area ==
*: Outgoing councillor.

=== East Ward ===
East Ward: 7 seats
Party	Candidate	FPv%	Count												
Party	Candidate	FPv%	1	2	3	4	5	6	7	8	9	10	11	12	13
Irish Unionist	John Good	19.60	667												
Sinn Féin	James Maguire	14.28	486												
Irish Unionist	Charles R. Dunbar			467											
Irish Unionist	William McMillan		-	-	-	-	-	-	-	-	-	444			
Sinn Féin	Joseph Curran		-	-	-	-	-	-	-	-	-	-	-	466	
Ratepayers	Thomas Ryan		-	-	-	-	-	-	-	-	-	-	-	426	
Sinn Féin	Denis Byrne		-	-	-	-	-	-	-	-	-	-	-	-	424
Labour	Thomas Doyle		-	-	-	-	-	-	-	-	-	-	-	-	329
Sinn Féin	Christopher O'Kelly (Note: Brother of Seán T. O'Kelly.)		-	-	-	-	-	-	-	-	-	-	-	302	
Ratepayers	G. W. Dench, J.P.		-	-	-	-	-	-	-	-	-	196			
Sinn Féin	Alice Ginnell		-	-	-	-	-	-	-	-	179				
Labour	Helen Sophia Chenevix		-	-	-	-	-	-	-	147					
Sinn Féin	Alfred McGloughlin		-	-	-	-	-	-	118						
Independent	John O'Brien		-	-	-	-	-	95							
Labour	Diarmid Joseph O'Leary		-	-	-	51									
Electorate: 4,693 Valid: 3,403 Spoilt: 61 Quota: 426 Turnout: 3,464

=== West Ward ===
West Ward: 8 seats
Party	Candidate	FPv%	Count			
Party	Candidate	FPv%	1			
Irish Unionist	William Beckett	19.27	787			
Ratepayers	Michael Fannin	16.06	656			
Irish Unionist	John Wesley Brittain	10.40	425	665		
Irish Unionist	George Robert Goodfellow	9.50	388			
Sinn Féin	Mary S. Humphreys	9.50	388			
Sinn Féin	Michael Greene	8.69	355			
Sinn Féin	Bartholomew O'Connor	7.91	323			
Irish Unionist	Sir Gabriel Stokes	7.74	316			
Sinn Féin	Michael Stafford	5.70	233			
Labour	J. Edward Nolan	5.56	227			
Ratepayers	William Mills Forsyth, J.P.	5.02	205			
Sinn Féin	Fergus O'Connor	1.79	73	-	-	-
Electorate: 5,876 Valid: 4,085 Spoilt: 71 Quota: 454 Turnout: 4,156
