= 1899 Fermanagh County Council election =

Local election in Ireland

The first election to Fermanagh County Council took place in April 1899 as part of that year's Irish local elections.

The election saw the council split evenly between Unionists and Nationalists. Concurrent district council elections saw Nationalists and Unionists both win 33 seats for Enniskillen Rural Council. Nationalists won a large majority on Enniskillen Board of Guardians, as 8 Cavan Divisions (which all returned Nationalists) were joined to the union. Nationalists won a majority on Lisnaskea Guardians and District Council, while Unionists won control of Irvinestown Council.

== Aggregate results ==
Fermanagh County Council election, 1899
Party	Seats	Gains	Losses	Net gain/loss	Seats %	Votes %	Votes	+/−
Irish Nationalist	10				50.00	56.35	3,922	
Irish Unionist	10				50.00	33.55	2,335	
Independent	0				0.00	10.10	703	

== Ward results ==
=== Belleek ===
Belleek
Party	Candidate	Votes	%	±%
Irish Nationalist	John McHugh	196		
Irish Unionist	D. E. Johnston	121		
Majority		75		
Turnout				

=== Crum ===
Crum
Party	Candidate	Votes	%	±%
Irish Nationalist	Patrick Blake	268		
Irish Nationalist	Edward Brady	167		
Majority		101		
Turnout				

=== Derrylea ===
Derrylea
Party	Candidate	Votes	%	±%
Irish Nationalist	James Tierney J.P.	356		
Irish Unionist	M. Graham	190		
Majority		166		
Turnout				

=== Derrylester ===
Derrylester
Party	Candidate	Votes	%	±%
Irish Nationalist	Owen McBarron	383		
Irish Nationalist	Patrick Charles Doogan M.P.	181		
Majority		202		
Turnout				

=== Enniskillen ===
Enniskillen
Party	Candidate	Votes	%	±%
Irish Nationalist	Patrick Crumley J.P.	366		
Irish Unionist	Thomas Plunkett	358		
Majority		8		
Turnout				

=== Florencecourt ===
Florencecourt
Party	Candidate	Votes	%	±%
Irish Unionist	William Teele J.P.	302		
Irish Nationalist	Francis Maguire	238		
Majority		64		
Turnout				

=== Garrison ===
Garrison
Party	Candidate	Votes	%	±%
Irish Nationalist	John Carroll	254		
Irish Nationalist	Dennis Gallagher	191		
Irish Unionist	John Nixon	50		
Majority		63		
Turnout				

=== Inishmacsaint ===
Inishmacsaint
Party	Candidate	Votes	%	±%
Irish Nationalist	Philip Timoney	222		
Irish Unionist	John Gordon	85		
Majority		137		
Turnout				

=== Lack ===
Lack
Party	Candidate	Votes	%	±%
Irish Unionist	R. Phillips	295		
Independent	George Evans	223		
Majority		72		
Turnout				

=== Lisnaskea ===
Lisnaskea
Party	Candidate	Votes	%	±%
Irish Unionist	George Arnold	264		
	Thomas Plunkett (PHR)	218		
Majority		146		
Turnout				

=== Magheravelly ===
Magheravelly
Party	Candidate	Votes	%	±%
Irish Nationalist	Patrick Owens	336		
Irish Unionist	J. C. Crozier J.P.	183		
Majority		153		
Turnout				

=== Monea ===
Monea
Party	Candidate	Votes	%	±%
Irish Unionist	John Kerr	282		
Independent	William Ferguson	262		
Majority		20		
Turnout				

=== Newtonbutler ===
Newtonbutler
Party	Candidate	Votes	%	±%
Irish Nationalist	Jeremiah Jordan MP	337		
Irish Unionist	S. Clarke	205		
Majority		132		
Turnout				

=== Rosslea ===
Rosslea
Party	Candidate	Votes	%	±%
Irish Nationalist	Luke Cassidy	214		
Irish Nationalist	John McMahon	133		
Irish Nationalist	Edward Maddon	80		
Majority		81		
Turnout				

=== Irvinestown ===
Irvinestown
Party	Candidate	Votes	%	±%
Irish Unionist	Charles Cockburn D'Arcy Irvine	uncontested		

=== Laragh ===
Laragh
Party	Candidate	Votes	%	±%
Irish Unionist	C. Williamson	uncontested		

=== Cross ===
Cross
Party	Candidate	Votes	%	±%
Irish Unionist	A. Savage	uncontested		

=== Kesh ===
Kesh
Party	Candidate	Votes	%	±%
Irish Unionist	E. M. Archdale MP	uncontested		

=== Maguiresbridge ===
Maguiresbridge
Party	Candidate	Votes	%	±%
Irish Unionist	Sir A. D. Brooke	uncontested		

=== Lisbellaw ===
Lisbellaw
Party	Candidate	Votes	%	±%
Irish Unionist	William Hurst J.P.	uncontested		

== Enniskillen Urban Guardians ==
Enniskillen Urban Guardians
Party	Candidate	Votes	%	±%
Irish Unionist	James Dundas Jnr.	360		
Irish Nationalist	Jeremiah Jordan MP	359		
Irish Unionist	Thomas Punkett MRIA	356		
Irish Unionist	William Teele J.P.	354		
Irish Nationalist	P. Crumley J.P.	353		
Irish Unionist	James Dundas Snr.	348		
Irish Unionist	John Graham	344		
Irish Unionist	Dr Kidd	344		
Irish Nationalist	James McGovern	341		
Irish Nationalist	Francis Little	340		
Irish Nationalist	James McElgum	340		
