= 1899 Monaghan County Council election =

Local election in Ireland

The first election to Monaghan County Council took place in April 1899 as part of that year's Irish local elections.

== Campaign ==
Under the Chairmanship of Col. John Leslie, the county Unionist Association met in early January to decide how to proceed, as there was an expectation that the party would be largely frozen out of the election, winning no more than five or six seats. As a result, the association attempted to build stronger links with Independent candidates, whilst also committing itself to contesting every possible seat. To achieve this, the association set up a Voters' Association, under the Honorary Presidency of W. Martin.

== Aggregate results ==
Monaghan County Council election, 1899
Party	Seats	Gains	Losses	Net gain/loss	Seats %	Votes %	Votes	+/−
Irish Nationalist	18					71.56	8,619	
Irish Unionist	1					22.80	2,746	
Independent	1					8.71	1,049	

== Ward results ==
=== Aughabog ===
Aughabog
Party	Candidate	Votes	%	±%
Irish Unionist	John Grey	295	50.8	
Irish Nationalist	James Brady	286	49.2	
Majority		9	1.6	
Turnout		581		
Irish Unionist win (new seat)				

=== Ballybay ===
Ballybay
Party	Candidate	Votes	%	±%
Irish Nationalist	Bernard McKenna	370		
Irish Unionist	Joseph McLean	119		
Majority		251		
Turnout		489		

=== Ballymackay ===
Ballymackay
Party	Candidate	Votes	%	±%
	J. McCaul	506		
	J. Witherington	160		
Majority				
Turnout				

=== Ballytrain ===
Ballytrain
Party	Candidate	Votes	%	±%
Irish Nationalist	Felix McGeough	482		
Irish Nationalist	Peter Keelaghan	27		
Majority				
Turnout				

=== Broomfield ===
Broomfield
Party	Candidate	Votes	%	±%
Irish Nationalist	Thomas Nolan	356		
Irish Nationalist	Owen Hanratty	220		
Majority				
Turnout				

=== Carrickmacross ===
Carrickmacross
Party	Candidate	Votes	%	±%
Irish Nationalist	James Daly	439		
Irish Unionist	Owen J. Smith	158		
Majority				
Turnout				

=== Castleblayney ===
Castleblayney
Party	Candidate	Votes	%	±%
Irish Nationalist	Patrick Duffy	368		
Irish Unionist	R. W. Harrison	243		
Majority				
Turnout				

=== Clones ===
Clones
Party	Candidate	Votes	%	±%
Irish Nationalist	Edward Tierney	441		
Irish Unionist	M. S. Knight	241		
Majority				
Turnout				

=== Clontibret ===
Clontibret
Party	Candidate	Votes	%	±%
Irish Nationalist	Patrick Walshe	322		
Irish Nationalist	Patrick Brenman	178		
Irish Unionist	Isaac Wilson	81		
Majority				
Turnout				

=== Creeve ===
Creeve
Party	Candidate	Votes	%	±%
Irish Nationalist	Peter Smith	434		
Irish Unionist	Thomas Ross	100		
Majority				
Turnout				

=== Cremarlin ===
Cremarlin
Party	Candidate	Votes	%	±%
Irish Nationalist	Patrick McBennett	299		
Irish Nationalist	Francis Connolly J.P.	245		
Irish Unionist	Robert Mulholland	115		
Majority				
Turnout				

=== Drum ===
Drum
Party	Candidate	Votes	%	±%
Irish Nationalist	Patrick Connolly	309		
Irish Unionist	Vesey Davidson	278		
Majority				
Turnout				

=== Emyvale ===
Emyvale
Party	Candidate	Votes	%	±%
Irish Nationalist	John Delaney	553		
Irish Unionist	Whitney U. Moutray	93		
Majority				
Turnout				

=== Glasslough ===
Glasslough
Party	Candidate	Votes	%	±%
Irish Nationalist	Owen Murphy	356	53.61	
Irish Unionist	Col. John Leslie	308	46.39	
Majority		48	7.22	
Turnout		664		

=== Inniskeen ===
Inniskeen
Party	Candidate	Votes	%	±%
Irish Nationalist	Edward Gartlan	323		
Irish Nationalist	P. Flanigan	308		
Irish Unionist	J. M. Boston	14		
Irish Nationalist	Thomas McCabe	13		
Majority				
Turnout				

=== Killunan ===
Killunan
Party	Candidate	Votes	%	±%
Irish Nationalist	Thomas Toal	525		
Irish Unionist	John Leary	131		
Majority				
Turnout				

=== Lough Fea ===
Lough Fea
Party	Candidate	Votes	%	±%
Irish Nationalist	J. J. McCaul	506		
Irish Unionist	Joseph Witherington	160		
Majority				
Turnout				

=== Newbliss ===
Newbliss
Party	Candidate	Votes	%	±%
Irish Nationalist	John Fitzpatrick	412		
Irish Unionist	J. C. Madden	196		
Majority		216		
Turnout		608		

=== Scotstown ===
Scotstown
Party	Candidate	Votes	%	±%
Irish Nationalist	Thomas Mohan	444		
Irish Unionist	Captain E. Fiddes	97		
Majority		347		
Turnout		541		

=== Tydavnet ===
Tydavnet
Party	Candidate	Votes	%	±%
Irish Nationalist	M. Fitzgerald	416		
Irish Unionist	E. H. Greene	117		
Majority				
Turnout				
