= Church of St John, Cutcombe =

Church in Somerset, England

Church of St John
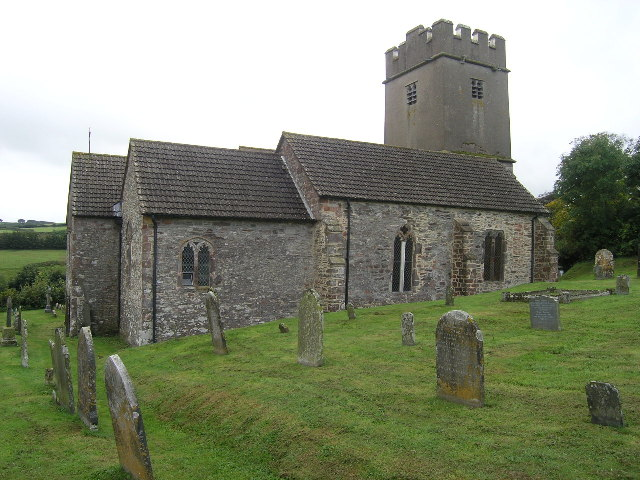

- Location within Somerset
- 51.1424°N 3.5295°W
- Type: Church
- Location: Cutcombe, Somerset, England

History
- Built: 13th century

Listed Building – Grade II*
- Official name: Church of St John
- Designated: 22 May 1969
- Reference no.: 1174575

The Anglican Church of St John in Cutcombe, Somerset, England was built in the 13th and 14th centuries. It is a Grade II* listed building.

== History ==
It is likely there was a church on the site from the early 12th century when it belonged to Bruton Priory, after previously falling within the remit of Glastonbury Abbey.

The date of construction of the current building is not known, however the tower is from the 13th century while the north aisle is dated to the 13th or early 14th century. In 1713 part of the north aisle was rebuilt and the whole building given a Victorian restoration in 1862 by Charles Edmund Giles.

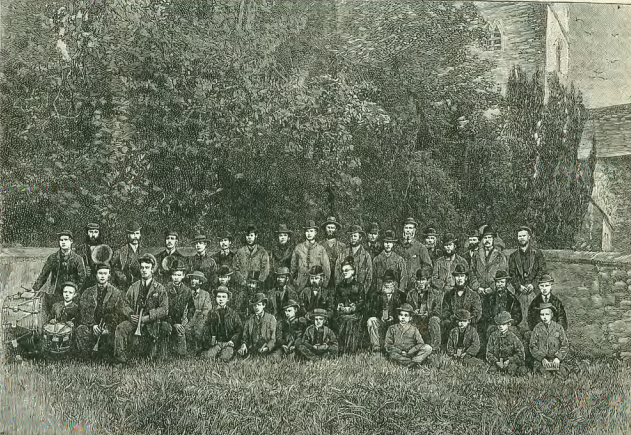
Alice King surrounded by her community Bible class in 1887

The Rev. John Myers King was vicar here in the 19th century and he had a multi-lingual daughter, Alice King who was blind by the age of seven. She went on write a dozen novels and to lead bible classes and Sunday Schools for up to seventy men and boys.

The organ was made by Henry Willis and brought to Cutcombe from the Methodist church in Hucknall, Nottinghamshire.

Further restoration of the church was carried out after £150,000 was raised in 2001.

The parish is part of the Exmoor benefice within the Diocese of Bath and Wells.

== Architecture ==
The stone building has a slate roof. It consists of a chancel, four-bay nave, three-bay north aisle, two-bay organ chamber, four-bay south aisle and a two-bay south chapel with a porch. The two-stage crenellated west tower is supported by diagonal buttresses.

Inside the church is a font with a Norman base of Purbeck Marble with an Italian marble bowl. The south aisle includes stained glass by Clayton and Bell.

In the churchyard is the base of a 14th century cross, which was restored in 1898 including the erection of an octagonal stone shaft and cross.

== See also ==
- List of ecclesiastical parishes in the Diocese of Bath and Wells
