= Gurunanak Darbar, Ireland =

Coordinates: 53.33181°N 6.22326°W

The Gurdwara Guru Nanak Darbar is the gurdwara of Dublin, Ireland. It has two main halls, Divan Hall and Langar Hall. Divan Hall is the main hall where the holy Guru Granth Sahib is kept. It is located on the site of the old Oscar Cinema in Ballsbridge, Dublin 4 which the Irish Sikh community purchased in 1987.

== Entrance ==
Inside the Gurdwara, near the entrance, is the Nishan Sahib, the large Sikh flag. Nishan is a Persian word with several meanings, one of which is "flag". Sahib, an Arabic word meaning lord or master, is used here as an honorific. Thus Nishan Sahib in the Sikh tradition means the holy flag or exalted ensign.

The Sikh pennant, made out of saffron-coloured cloth is triangular, the two equal sides normally being twice the length of the third. On it is commonly printed the Sikh emblem, comprising a Khanda (two-edged sword), a Chakra (an edged circular weapon) and two Kirpans which cross each other at the handles, with the blades flanking the Chakra. The flagstaff has an iron or steel Khanda fixed on the top and is covered in orange cloth which is changed on special occasions and every year in April for the festival of Vaisakhi.

== Divan Hall ==
When Sikhs enter the Divan Hall they walk to the front, where they bow to the Guru Granth Sahib as a mark of respect. Members of all faiths can enter the Divan Hall with their heads covered with a scarf or any piece of cloth usually provided in a box at the entrance of the Gurdwara. They can also use their own piece of cloth.

Guru Granth Sahib is the 11th and everlasting Guru of the Sikhs. The word guru is composed of two words, gu meaning "darkness" and ru meaning "light"; thus guru is the "light that dispels all darkness". Granth is a Sanskrit word signifying a holy book. Sahib is added to its name following the Sikh tradition of expressing respect and veneration towards the Lord. In its 1430 pages, the shabads (hymns) of the Guru Granth Sahib, written in Gurmukhi script by Sikh gurus and saints from various beliefs and religions, are arranged in 31 ragas (the classical Indian melodic modes).

To reflect its importance, the Guru Granth Sahib is placed on the Manji Sahib, a raised platform covered by the palki (canopy), and covered with pieces of beautiful cloth (Romala). Both men and women can read from the Guru Granth Sahib in the gurdwara.

Donations, which may include grocery for the kitchen, money or both, are placed respectfully in front of the Guru Granth Sahib or in the money box. Devotees then sit on the carpeted floor of the divan hall, taking care not to turn their back to the Guru Granth Sahib or point their feet at it, as doing so would show disrespect. Women generally sit on one side and men on the other side of the hall. Sitting on the carpeted floor expresses humility before the Guru and equality with fellow Sikhs and others. Children sit with either parent.

== Worship ==
Kirtan is the singing of hymns from the Guru Granth Sahib, and Katha is the reading of the Guru Granth Sahib with explanations. On the right of the Guru Granth Sahib, musicians with harmoniums, tabla and other musical instruments sing hymns from it. Both men and women can lead the congregation in prayer or singing hymns from the Guru Granth Sahib.

Ardaas is a prayer performed by Sikhs to thank Waheguru (the Almighty) for all that he has done and to pray for the welfare and prosperity of the whole universe. In the congregational setting, the ardaas is recited by one person while everyone stands reverently, hands in prayer pose, facing the Guru Granth Sahib. Periodically throughout the recitation, the assembly as a whole repeats the word "Waheguru" to support the idea that God, the Wondrous Guru, is the Supreme Being capable of everything. At the completion of ardaas, the congregation bows down as one and places their foreheads on the floor to symbolize that they will go as low as necessary to support Waheguru and all that He stands for. On rising, the sangat (congregation) proclaims "Waheguru Ji ka Khalsa, Waheguru Ji ki Fateh" (the Khalsa belongs to the Lord, to whom [also] belongs the Victory), "Bole So Nihal" (he who pronounces these words shall be fulfilled) and "Sat Sri Akal" (True is the Timeless Lord).

Karha Prashad: At the end of the ardaas, prashad made up of flour, sugar and ghee (clarified butter) is served to the entire congregation. It should be accepted sitting with cupped hands raised high to make it easy for the volunteer (sewadar) to serve. This is regarded as food blessed by the Guru and should not be refused. If uncertain of being able to eat much, one says "very small portion" to the approaching volunteer. Parshad should not be thrown away.

== Langar ==
The Langar is a free kitchen designed to uphold the principle of equality among all people of the world, regardless of religion, caste, colour, creed, age, gender or social status. The tradition of langar also expresses the ethics of sharing, community, inclusiveness and oneness of all humankind. It is an important aspect in the Sikh way of life, where a free vegetarian meal is prepared and served to all who come to the door of the Guru. Sikhs come to the langar hall after prayers. Everyone sits on the carpeted floor and has a meal. The work of preparing and serving the food and cleaning up afterwards is called Seva, which means voluntary, selfless service. This practice serves as a practical demonstration and a reminder to Sikhs that everyone is equal, irrespective of their status – high or low, rich or poor – and that they should share their possessions with others.
