= Clyde Road =

Road in Dublin, Ireland

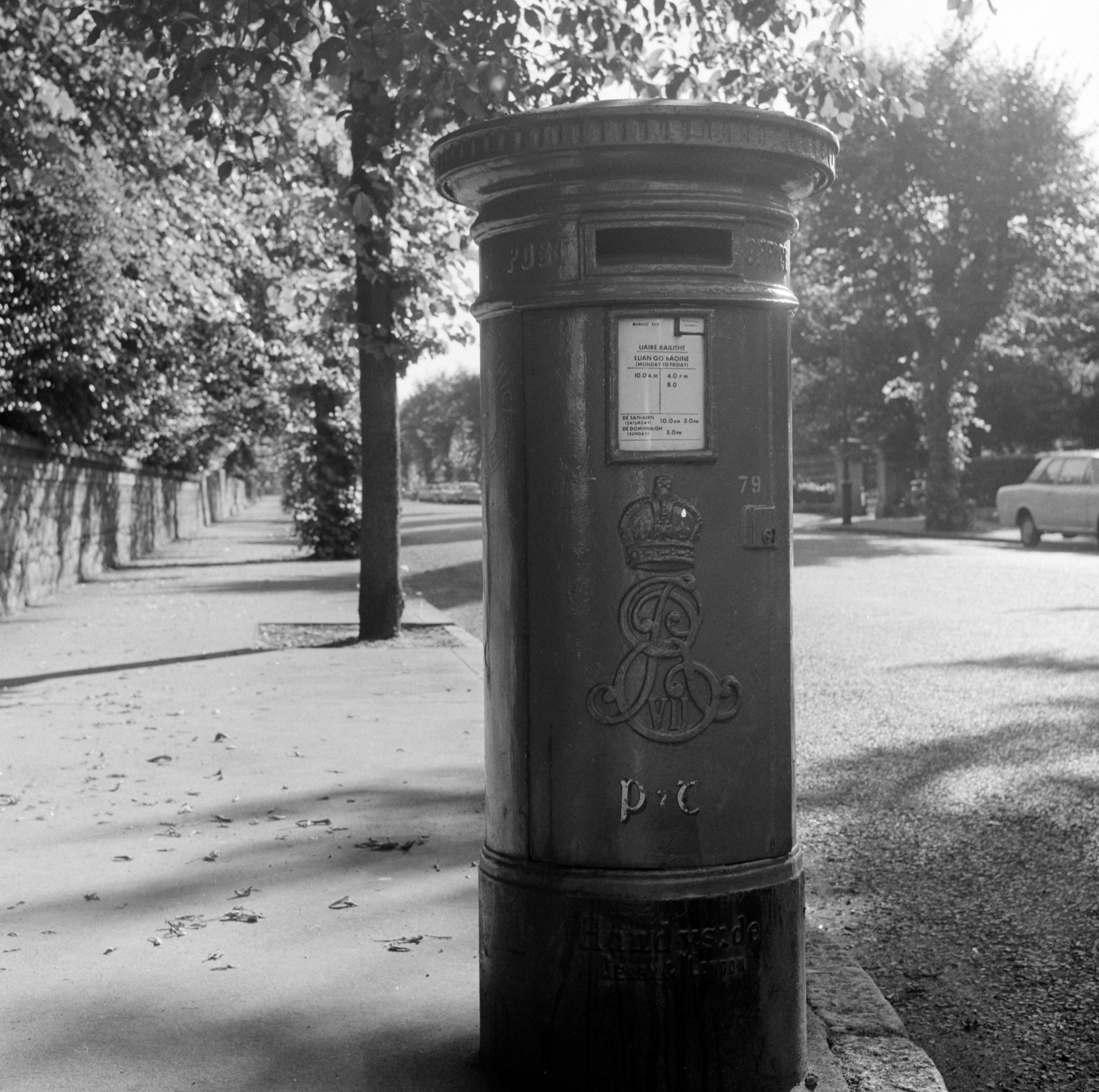
- Pillar box on Clyde Road

- Location within Dublin
- Native name: Bóthar Chluaidh (Irish)
- Namesake: Colin Campbell, 1st Baron Clyde
- Length: 500 m (1,600 ft)
- Width: 20 metres (66 ft)
- Location: Ballsbridge, Dublin, Ireland
- Postal code: D04
- Coordinates: 53°19′45.08″N 6°14′14.59″W
- east end: Elgin Road
- west end: Wellington Road, Wellington Place, Pembroke Park

Other
- Known for: embassies, St Bartholomew's Church

Clyde Road (Irish: Bóthar Chluaidh) runs from Wellington Place to a junction with Elgin Road in Ballsbridge. It meets Raglan Road and Wellington Road.

== History ==
The road is named after Colin Campbell, 1st Baron Clyde (1792–1863), a Scottish soldier who fought in India during the Indian mutiny; he also policed the Tithe War in Ireland.

== Notable buildings ==
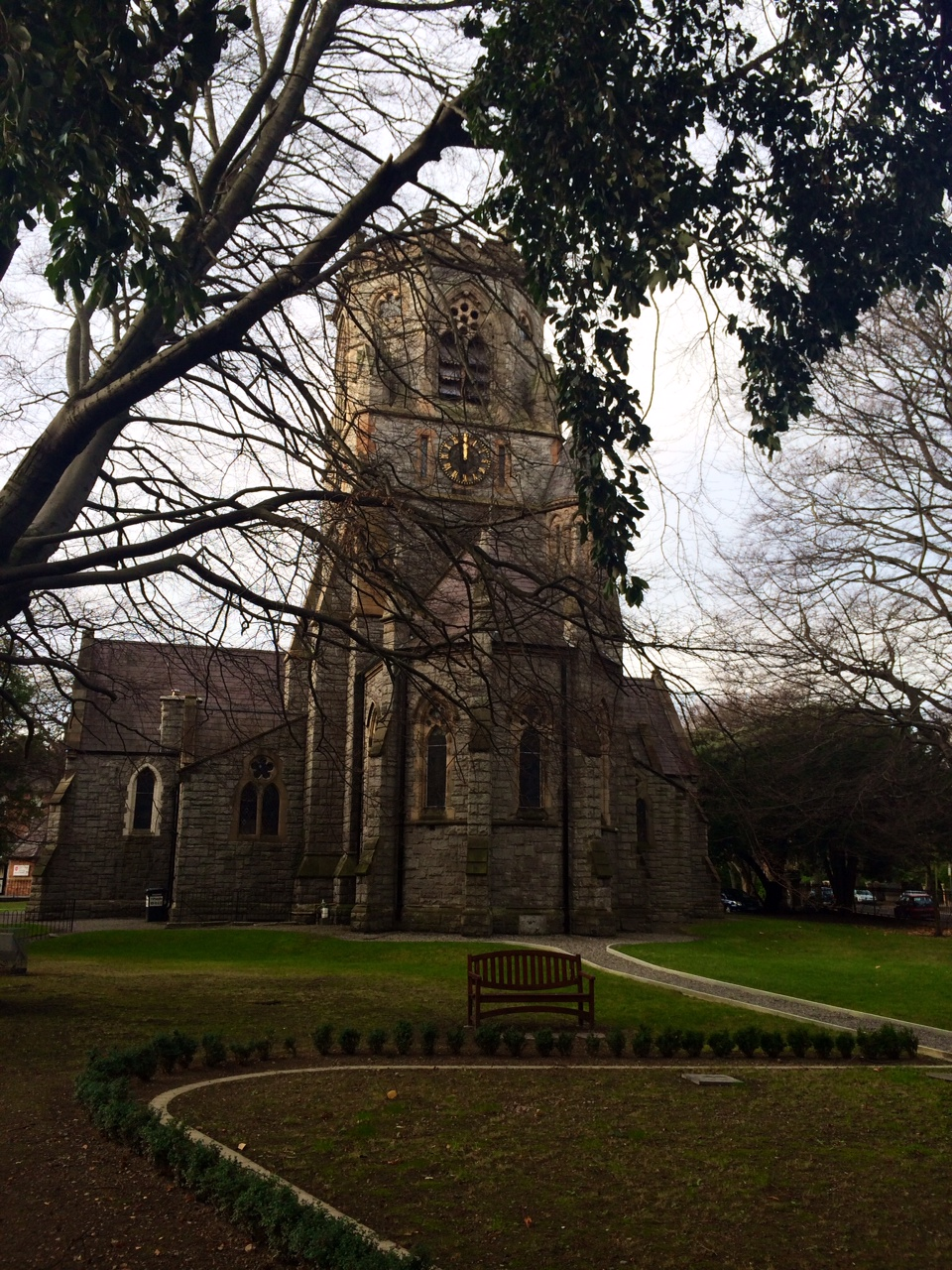
St Bartholomew's Church, Dublin located on Clyde Road.

The embassy of the United States is at the crossroads with Pembroke Road in Ballsbridge, while the National Headquarters and training centre of the Sovereign Military Order of Malta and the Order of Malta Ambulance Corps are located at 32 Clyde Road, Ballsbridge, and the headquarters of The Institution of Engineers of Ireland is at 22 Clyde Road. St Conleth's College, now a co-educational school, was established at 17 Clyde Road in 1939 but in 1940 moved to number 28.

== See also ==
- List of streets and squares in Dublin
