= 1899 Antrim County Council election =

Local election in Ireland

The first election to Antrim County Council took place in April 1899 as part of that year's Irish local elections.

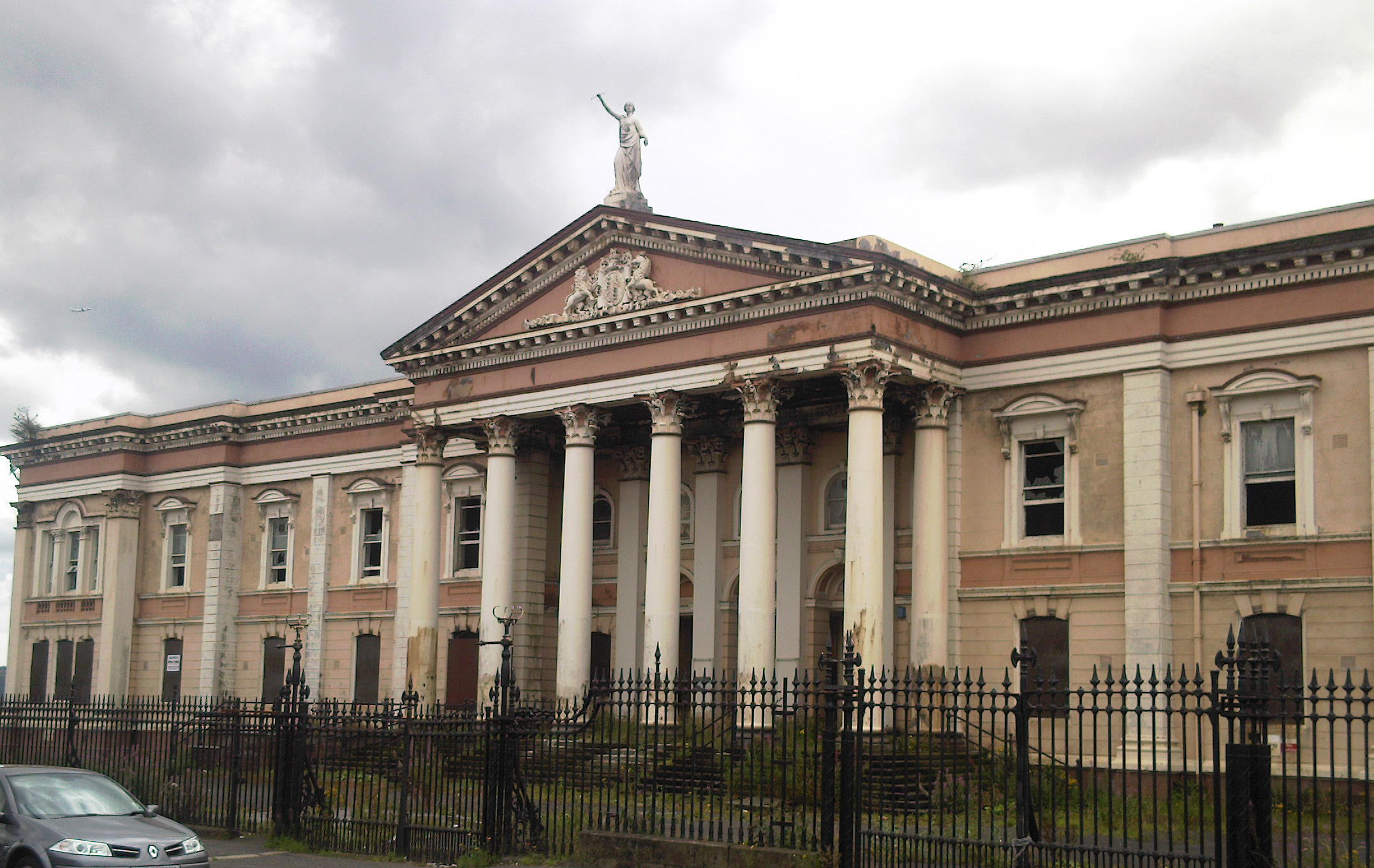
Following the election, the new council was based in Crumlin Road Courthouse.

== Aggregate results ==
Antrim County Council election, 1899
Party	Seats	Gains	Losses	Net gain/loss	Seats %	Votes %	Votes	+/−
Ind. Unionist	19							
Ind. Nationalist	2							

== Ward results ==
=== Ahoghill ===
Ahoghill
Party	Candidate	Votes	%	±%
Ind. Unionist	T. Agnew	855	52.13	
Ind. Unionist	Lt. Col. Rowan	785	47.87	
Majority		70	4.27	
Turnout		1640		

=== Antrim ===
Antrim
Party	Candidate	Votes	%	±%
Antrim Presbyterian Voters’ Association	J. B. Wiley	921	56.85	
Antrim Working Men’s Constitutional Association	H. B. Murray	699	43.15	
Majority		222	13.70	
Turnout		1620		

=== Ballycastle ===
Ballycastle
Party	Candidate	Votes	%	±%
Ind. Unionist	Robert P. Woodside	938	50.29	
Ind. Nationalist	J. P. O'Kane JP	927	49.71	
Majority		11	0.58	
Turnout		1865		

=== Ballyclare ===
Ballyclare
Party	Candidate	Votes	%	±%
Ind. Unionist	David Dickie	940	57.92	
	P. J. Dickens	683	42.08	
Majority		257	15.83	
Turnout		1623		

=== Carrickfergus ===
Carrickfergus
Party	Candidate	Votes	%	±%
Ind. Unionist	A. Miscampbell	789	50.13	
	T. Houston	785	49.87	
Majority		4	0.25	
Turnout		1574		

=== Cushendall ===
Cushendall
Party	Candidate	Votes	%	±%
Ind. Nationalist	J. McSparran	1,143	78.23	
	G. McAuley	318	21.77	
Majority		825	56.47	
Turnout		1461		

=== Galgorm ===
Galgorm
Party	Candidate	Votes	%	±%
	J. Caruth	806		
	A. Kennedy	780		
Majority				
Turnout				

=== Glenarm ===
Glenarm
Party	Candidate	Votes	%	±%
Ind. Unionist	J. Houston	831		
Ind. Unionist	W. J. Crawford	457		
Majority				
Turnout				

=== Kells ===
Kells
Party	Candidate	Votes	%	±%
	M. Gault	1,023		
	F. Owens	531		
Majority				
Turnout				

=== Killoquin ===
Killoquin
Party	Candidate	Votes	%	±%
Ind. Unionist	A. Robinson	1,025		
Ind. Unionist	J. Henry	271		
Majority				
Turnout				

=== Portrush ===
Portrush
Party	Candidate	Votes	%	±%
Ind. Unionist	Sir Francis McNaghten H.M.L. J.P.	623	55.48	
Presbyterian Unionist Voters’ Association	William Moore	316	28.14	
Ind. Unionist	Allan Mill	184	16.38	
Majority		307	27.34	
Turnout		1123	61.77	

=== Randalstown ===
Randalstown
Party	Candidate	Votes	%	±%
Ind. Nationalist	F. Grant	728	51.02	
	J. C. Webb	528	37.00	
	J. P. Butler	171	11.98	
Majority		200	14.02	
Turnout		1427		
