= 1899 Dublin County Council election =

Local authority election in Ireland

- 6 April 1899

20 of 29 seats on Dublin County Council 15 seats needed for a majority
	First party	Second party	Third party
Party	Irish Nationalist	Irish Unionist	Land and Labour League (Ireland)
Seats won	11	6	2
	Fourth party
Party	Parnellite
Seats won	1
- Map of the results by electoral division.
Elected Council control
Irish Nationalist

The 1899 Dublin County Council election was held on 6 April 1899. The election was peaceful, however rain prevented many voters from travelling to polling stations. The election was held alongside other local elections across Ireland.

== Aggregate results ==
Dublin County Council election, 1899
Party	Seats	Gains	Losses	Net gain/loss	Seats %	Votes %	Votes	+/−
Irish Nationalist	11	N/A	N/A	N/A	55.0	51.0	9,254	
Irish Unionist	6	N/A	N/A	N.A	30.0	38.0	6,904	
Land and Labour League (Ireland)	2	N/A	N/A	N/A	10.0	7.5	1,365	
Parnellite	1	N/A	N/A	N/A	5.0	3.5	636	
Total	20						18,159	

|}

== Ward results ==
=== Balbriggan ===
Balbriggan
Party	Candidate	Votes	%	±%
Irish Nationalist	W. J. Cummiskey	Unopposed		

=== Blackrock ===
Blackrock Electorate: 1,434
Party	Candidate	Votes	%	±%
Land and Labour League	William Field	738	62.2	
Irish Unionist	John Byrne	449	37.8	
Majority		289	24.2	
Turnout		1,179	82.2	

=== Castleknock ===
Castleknock Electorate: 665
Party	Candidate	Votes	%	±%
Irish Nationalist	Joseph Mooney	90	62.9	
Irish Nationalist	William Walsh	53	37.1	
Majority		37	25.8	
Turnout				

=== Coolock ===
Coolock Electorate: 1,074
Party	Candidate	Votes	%	±%
Land and Labour League	James J. Flood	429	61.4	
Irish Nationalist	Joseph O'Neill	270	38.6	
Majority		159	22.8	
Turnout				

=== Dalkey ===
Dalkey Electorate: 1,176
Party	Candidate	Votes	%	±%
Irish Unionist	Robert K. Clay	675	50.1	
Irish Nationalist	W. A. Maxwell	673	49.9	
Majority		2	0.2	
Turnout				

=== Donnybrook ===
Donnybrook Electorate: 2,146
Party	Candidate	Votes	%	±%
Irish Unionist	Samuel Worthington	557	54.8	
Irish Nationalist	George R. Peart	459	45.2	
Majority		102	10.0	
Turnout		1016	47.3	

=== Drumcondra ===
Drumcondra Electorate: 1,148
Party	Candidate	Votes	%	±%
Irish Unionist	Henry Gore Lindsay	637	57.5	
Irish Nationalist	Francis Keegan	471	42.5	
Majority		166	15.0	
Turnout				

=== Dundrum ===
Dundrum Electorate: 668
Party	Candidate	Votes	%	±%
Irish Nationalist	William A. Rafferty	382	46.9	
Irish Unionist	Isaac W. Usher	218	26.7	
Irish Nationalist	Peter J. MacCabe	215	26.4	
Majority		164	20.2	
Turnout				

=== Howth ===
Howth Electorate: 1,678
Party	Candidate	Votes	%	±%
Irish Nationalist	James McKenna	507	53.7	
Irish Unionist	Edward Vernon	438	46.3	
Majority		69	7.4	
Turnout				

=== Kingstown ===
Kingstown Electorate: 2,049
Party	Candidate	Votes	%	±%
Irish Nationalist	Thomas Brown	813	57.1	
Irish Unionist	Adam S. Findlater	612	42.9	
Majority		201	21.8	
Turnout		1,425	69.6	

=== Lucan ===
Lucan Electorate: 922
Party	Candidate	Votes	%	±%
Irish Unionist	Charles Nicholas Colthurst-Vesey	272	41.3	
Land and Labour League	John Godley	198	30.0	
Irish Nationalist	John Brennan	97	14.7	
Irish Nationalist	William Bobbett	92	14.0	
Majority		74	11.3	
Turnout		659	71.5	

=== Lusk ===
Lusk Electorate: 1,212
Party	Candidate	Votes	%	±%
Irish Nationalist	Edward Rooney	635	82.1	
Irish Unionist	Edward H. Woods	138	17.9	
Majority		497	64.2	
Turnout				

=== New Kilmainham ===
New Kilmainham Electorate: 1,466
Party	Candidate	Votes	%	±%
Parnellite	Andrew C. Tynan	636	62.5	
Irish Nationalist	John Joseph Lawler	381	37.5	
Majority		255	25.0	
Turnout				

=== Pembroke West ===
Pembroke West Electorate: 2,057
Party	Candidate	Votes	%	±%
Irish Nationalist	James Mahony	651	53.4	
Irish Unionist	Robert W. Jackson	568	46.6	
Majority		83	6.8	
Turnout				

=== Rathcoole ===
Rathcoole
Party	Candidate	Votes	%	±%
Irish Nationalist	Robert Boardman	265	36.9	
Irish Nationalist	John Molloy	178	24.8	
Irish Nationalist	James H. McGrane	171	23.8	
Irish Unionist	John Kennedy	105	14.6	
Majority		87	12.1	
Turnout				

=== Rathfarnham ===
Rathfarnham Electorate: 966
Party	Candidate	Votes	%	±%
Irish Nationalist	Michael Flannigan	490	70.1	
Irish Unionist	Hercules L. B. Rowley	209	29.9	
Majority		281	40.2	
Turnout				

=== Rathmines East ===
Rathmines East Electorate: 3,169
Party	Candidate	Votes	%	±%
Irish Unionist	Vere Ward Brown	974	65.7	
Irish Nationalist	Patrick Greaves	508	34.3	
Majority		466	31.4	
Turnout		1,482	46.9	

=== Rathmines West ===
Rathmines West Electorate: 2,496
Party	Candidate	Votes	%	±%
Irish Unionist	Edward M. Hodgson	662	62.9	
Irish Nationalist	John Joseph Crooks	390	37.1	
Majority		272	25.8	
Turnout				

=== Stillorgan ===
Stillorgan Electorate: 1,250
Party	Candidate	Votes	%	±%
Irish Nationalist	John Joseph Reilly	505	56.4	
Irish Unionist	Lewis John Ball	390	45.6	
Majority		115	10.8	
Turnout				

=== Swords ===
Swords Electorate: 995
Party	Candidate	Votes	%	±%
Irish Nationalist	Patrick J. O'Neill	528	55.1	
Ind. Nationalist	Thomas Aungier	430	44.9	
Majority		98	10.2	
Turnout				
