= 1899 Limerick Corporation election =

Local election in Ireland

An election for Limerick Municipal Council was held in 1899 as part of the wider 1899 Irish local elections. Following the reforms of the 1898 Act Limerick's franchise had increased from 709 to 5,521.

A total of 79 candidates contested the 40 seats; with 27 of the outgoing councillors putting themselves forward for re-election, 34 Laborites putting themselves forward, 18 Merchants and large rate-payers.

The election saw Labour winning control of the council, with 24 of the councils 40 seats. Hand in hand with Labour's victory, went the victory of the Irish Republican Brotherhood. Of the 40 councillors, 21 were members of the IRB. Of these 21 IRB members, 18 were Labourites.

== Aggregate results ==
Limerick Corporation election, 1899
Party	Seats	Gains	Losses	Net gain/loss	Seats %	Votes %	Votes	+/−
LEA	24					53.22	9,070	
Re-elect	11					27.21	4,637	
Merchant	5					19.58	3,337	

The result had the following consequences for the total number of seats on the council after the elections:

Party	Previous council		New council	
Party	Cllr	Ald	Cllr	Ald
Independent	32	8	12	4
Labour	0	0	20	4
Total	32	8	32	8
Total	40		40	
Working majority	32	8	8	0
Working majority	40		8	

== Ward results ==
Abbey Ward
Party	Candidate	Votes	%	±%
Re-elect	M. McDonnell	403		
LEA	W. Fitzgerald	356		
LEA	J. O'Brien	342		
LEA	M. Murphy	332		
LEA	P. Moloney	324		
Re-elect	J.J. Cleary J.P	205		
Re-elect	J. Kivlehan	179		
Merchant	W. Holliday	86		
Merchant	J. Power	54		
Turnout		2,281		

Castle Ward
Party	Candidate	Votes	%	±%
LEA	D. Gilligan	345		
LEA	J. Hassett	325		
LEA	J. Connery	318		
LEA	J. Vaughan	311		
Re-elect	T. Donnellan	290		
Re-elect	A. Hall J.P.	231		
Re-elect	R. Nash	156		
Re-elect	W. O'Connell	131		
Merchant	W. McDonnell	82		
Turnout		2,189		

Custom House Ward
Party	Candidate	Votes	%	±%
LEA	M. Joyce	276		
LEA	J. Kett	264		
Independent	T. Cleeve J.P	225		
Independent	S. Quin J.P	224		
Independent	L. Carr	197		
LEA	J. Maloney	194		
LEA	J. O'Neill	172		
Independent	R. Gleeson	102		
Independent	W. Frost	72		
Independent	D. Nelson	68		
Independent	J. McMahon	30		
Turnout		1,824		
