= St Bartholomew's Church, Dublin =

Church in Ireland

Coordinates: 53.3299°N 6.23626°W

Saint Bartholomew's Church
- Irish: Teampall San Parthalán
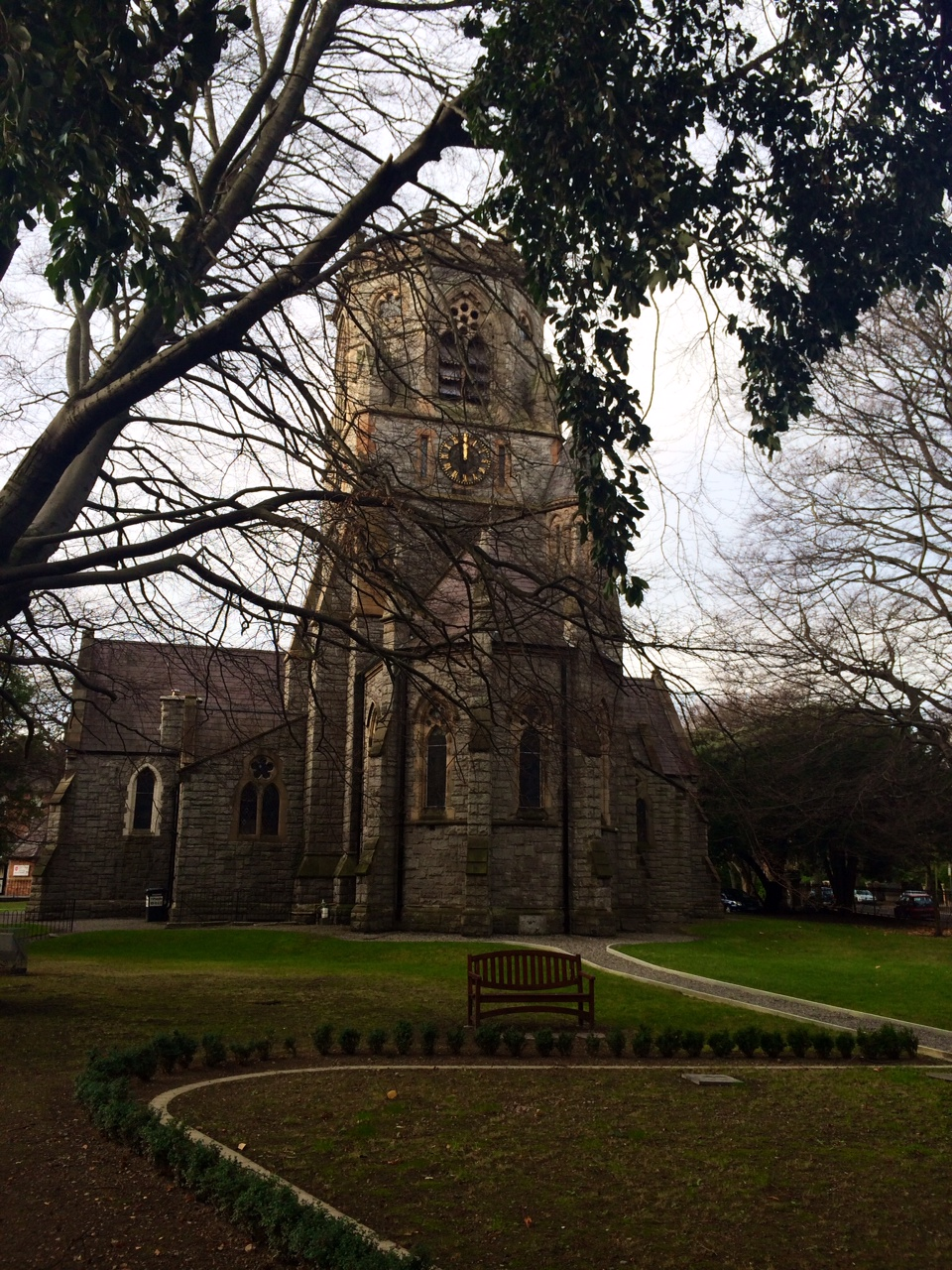

- Location: Clyde Road, Ballsbridge, Dublin
- Country: Ireland
- Denomination: Anglican
- Churchmanship: Anglo-Catholic
- Website: stbartholomews.ie

History
- Dedication: St. Bartholomew
- Consecrated: 1867

Architecture
- Architect: Thomas Henry Wyatt
- Architectural type: Church

Administration
- Province: Dublin
- Diocese: Diocese of Dublin and Glendalough
- Parish: Ballsbridge

Clergy
- Vicar: The Rev. Andrew McCroskery

Saint Bartholomew's Church, Dublin, is a Church of Ireland (Anglican) parish church located on Clyde Road in Ballsbridge on the Southside of Dublin.

== History ==
The church was consecrated in 1867. Many of its original features are intact, such as the sanctuary mosaics and the elaborate wrought iron choir screen. The architect was Thomas Henry Wyatt. The rectory was built in 1872 by the architect James Edward Rogers.

The bells were cast by Gillett & Bland of Croydon and hung in 1881. Although described as a "carillon", there are only eight bells, making it technically a chime.

Julius Turing (1873–1947) and Ethel Stoney (1881–1976), parents of the mathematician and computer scientist Alan Turing (1912–1954), were married in the church in October 1907.

The church is the focal point of the civil parish of the same name in the barony of Dublin.

== Liturgy ==
Saint Bartholomew's Church maintains a liturgical tradition that is broadly related to that of the Anglo-Catholic tradition. Anglo-Catholicism distinguishes that section or party of the Anglican Communion which stems from the Tractarian Movement of the 1830s. (This movement was centred in Oxford and included such influential figures as John Henry Newman, one of the prime movers in the founding of what was to become University College Dublin.) Anglo-Catholics hold a "high" doctrine of the Church and the sacraments; they attach great importance to the apostolic succession, that is, to an episcopal order derived from the apostles; to the historical continuity of the existing Church with the Church of the earliest centuries; and to the Church's ultimate independence of the State.

The church offers a weekly Sunday Solemn Eucharist (sometimes referred to as High Mass) that includes a sung liturgy, the use of candles, Eucharistic vestments and incense, and liturgical processions. Clergy are assisted by servers (including acolytes and a thurifer). Choral Evensong is offered on Sundays, and on festivals or the eve of festivals there is Solemn Evensong (with incense) and Benediction of the Blessed Sacrament. The main services are accompanied by the parish choirs.

== Vicars ==
The following have served as vicars of St Bartholomew's:

- 1864–1871: Arthur Altham Dawson
- 1871–1905: Richard Travers Smith
- 1905–1918: Harry Vere White (later Bishop of Limerick)
- 1918–1951: Walter Cadden Simpson
- 1951–1957: Robert Norman Sidney Craig
- 1957–1964: Henry Homan Warner
- 1964–1972: James Maurice George Carey
- 1972–1987: John Thomas Farquhar Paterson (later Dean of Christ Church Cathedral, Dublin)
- 1978–1985: John Robert Winder Neill (later Archbishop of Dublin)
- 1985–2000: John Andrew McKay
- 2000–2004: William James Ritchie
- 2004–2007: Michael Thompson
- 2008–present: Andrew McCroskery

== Music ==
The church is celebrated for its fine music and is often used as a concert venue.

=== Choirs ===
The choir of boys and men at the church is one of the two remaining all-male Church of Ireland parish church choirs in the country (the other being the male choir at St George's Church in Belfast). The male choir at St Bartholomew's generally sings at least one of the choral services each Sunday during term-time. The remainder are sung by the girls' choir (formed in 2002 and now playing an increasingly prominent role in the church's regular worship as well as undertaking a programme of regular concerts and joint events around the city and country), the Elgin Chorale (which sings during choir vacations) and the newly formed chamber choir, the Clyde Chorale. In recent years, the activities of the choir have expanded to include regular concert appearances. The boy choristers have sung many times in the National Concert Hall, Dublin, where their performances have included the War Requiem of Benjamin Britten and J. S. Bach's St Matthew Passion. The choirs' repertoire is fully representative of the major styles of choral music from the sixteenth century up to the present day.

=== Organ ===
The organ was built in 1887 by Gray & Davison. Rebuilt in 1925, it was then left largely unaltered until 1963 when another firm, J. W. Walker & Sons Ltd, undertook a major restoration. This rebuild changed the character of the organ but retained most of the original pipework and mechanism. The organ was last rebuilt by Trevor Crowe of Dublin in 2002. Much of the original instrument's character was brought back by restoring the third manual. In addition, sophisticated technology was incorporated, allowing the player to program sequences of stops and pre-define stop combinations. The instrument was cleverly fitted into a relatively small chamber on the north side of the building.

The first radio broadcast of an organ recital at the church was made in 1935.

==== Organists ====
- 1867–1883: William Henry Owen
- 1883–1884: J. C. Marks
- 1884–1938: William Henry Vipond Barry
- 1938–1946: Edward Samson Fry
- 1946–1956: Alfred S. Burrowes
- 1956–1970: G. David Lee
- 1970–1985: David Milne
- 1985–2007: Malcolm Wisener (subsequently organist of Saint Fin Barre's Cathedral in Cork)
- 2007–2008: Peter Parshall (Acting)
- 2008–2010: Fraser Wilson
- 2010–2011: Peter Parshall
- 2011–2021: Tristan Russcher
