= 1899 Kingstown Urban District Council election =

1899 Irish local government election

Elections to the Kingstown Urban District Council took place on Monday 16 January 1899 as part of local elections that year. Following the election, T. W. Robinson was elected council Chairman.

== Results by party ==
Party	Seats	±	Votes	%	±%
Irish Unionist	16		5,476	66.43	
Irish Nationalist	5		2,528	30.67	
Independent	0	Steady	239	2.90	
Totals	21	Steady	8,243	100.00	—

== Ward results ==
=== Monkstown ===
Monkstown (3) Electorate:
Party	Candidate	Votes	%	±%
Irish Unionist	Adam S. Findlater, M.A., J.P. (incumbent Commissioner)	166		
Irish Unionist	William Wallace (incumbent Commissioner)	158		
Irish Unionist	John McCullagh, J.P. (incumbent Commissioner)	148		
Irish Nationalist	J. J. Kennedy	86		
Turnout		558		

=== West ===
West (6)
Party	Candidate	Votes	%	±%
Irish Nationalist	Philip P. Hynes (incumbent Commissioner)	574		
Irish Nationalist	John Carr (incumbent Commissioner)	437		
Irish Nationalist	James Triston (incumbent Commissioner)	315		
Irish Nationalist	Michael J. Collins (incumbent Commissioner)	314		
Irish Unionist	R. Blount	300		
Irish Unionist	Fred Thompson	294		
Irish Nationalist	J. J. Kennedy	260		
Irish Unionist	T. Pennell	259		
Irish Unionist	George Thompson	246		
	Samuel Smith (incumbent Commissioner)	239		
Turnout		3,238		

=== East ===
East (6)
Party	Candidate	Votes	%	±%
Irish Unionist	Thomas W. Robinson (incumbent Commissioner)	301		
Irish Unionist	Col. D. G. Beamish (incumbent Commissioner)	297		
Irish Unionist	Alexander Joseph Taylor	290		
Irish Unionist	Edward Browett	284		
Irish Unionist	Thomas Ross (incumbent Commissioner)	283		
Irish Nationalist	Thomas Brown (incumbent Commissioner)	281		
Irish Unionist	George H. Hammersley Heenan	274		
Irish Nationalist	Dr. Roche, J.P.	83		
Turnout		2,093		

=== Glasthule ===
Glasthule (6)
Party	Candidate	Votes	%	±%
Irish Unionist	James Evans, P.L.G. (incumbent Commissioner)	383		
Irish Unionist	William G. Berrett (incumbent Commissioner)	370		
Irish Unionist	Frederick G. Coldwell (incumbent Commissioner)	366		
Irish Unionist	Col. B. W. Blood (incumbent Commissioner)	360		
Irish Unionist	Frederick. A. Buckley (incumbent Commissioner)	359		
Irish Unionist	Henry J. Clarke (incumbent Commissioner)	338		
Irish Nationalist	J. J. Kennedy	178		
Turnout		2,354		
