= Pembroke Town Hall, Dublin =

Municipal building in Ballsbridge, County Dublin, Ireland

Pembroke Town Hall
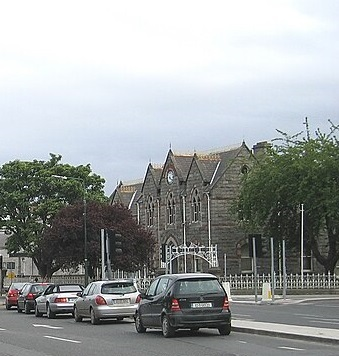
- Pembroke Town Hall

- Location within Dublin

General information
- Architectural style: Gothic Revival stye
- Location: Merrion Road, Ballsbridge, Ireland
- Coordinates: 53.3283°N 6.2302°W
- Completed: 1880

Design and construction
- Architect: Edward Henry Carson

Pembroke Town Hall is a municipal building in Merrion Road, Ballsbridge, Dublin, Ireland. The building currently accommodates the offices of the City of Dublin Vocational Education Committee.

== History ==
After significant population growth, largely associated with its development as a residential suburb of Dublin, the township of Pembroke appointed town commissioners in 1863. The town commissioners established their first town hall at Ballsbridge Terrace but, in the early 1870s, decided to erect a more substantial building. The site they selected on the southwest side of Merrion Road was donated by the principal landowner in the area, George Herbert, 13th Earl of Pembroke. He also provided approximately £2,000 of the finance for the construction costs. The new building was designed by Edward Henry Carson in the Gothic Revival stye, built by Gahan & Sons in Ballyknockan granite with red sandstone dressings at a cost of £3,300 and was completed in 1880.

The original design involved an asymmetrical main frontage of three bays facing onto Merrion Road. The central bay featured an arched opening flanked by polished marble colonnettes supporting an architrave, which was surrounded by voussoirs. The other bays on the ground floor were fenestrated by pointed sash windows, while the first floor all three bays were fenestrated by bi-partite mullioned windows with quatrefoils in the heads, and surmounted by gables. There was a clock in the central gable and roundels in the others. Internally, the principal rooms were the various municipal offices on the ground floor, and the boardroom, which was 45 feet (14 m) long and 21 feet (6.4 m) wide, on the first floor. Ornate chairs, designed by James Hicks, were installed in the boardroom. There was an elegant staircase with a fine stained glass window at the top of the first flight.

In 1899, the town commissioners were replaced by an urban district council, with the town hall becoming the offices of the new council. The building was extended to the southeast by three extra bays to create a fire station in the early 20th century. The works were carried out by G. & T. Crampton to a design by Charles Herbert Ashworth and were completed in 1902. The extension contained three round headed openings on the ground floor. On the first floor, the central bay was fenestrated by another bi-partite mullioned window with a quatrefoil in the head, and surmounted by a gable, while the outer bays were fenestrated by three tall casement windows in each bay.

During the Easter Rising, the commander of the 177th (2/1st Lincoln and Leicester) Brigade, Brigadier-General Lancelot Richard Carleton, established a temporary headquarters in the town hall. The building was used as a place to hold and interrogate political prisoners. The Irish republican, Éamon de Valera, who had commanded the 3rd Battalion, Irish Volunteers at Boland's Mill on the Grand Canal Dock during the fighting and was the last commander to surrender, was arrested by British soldiers and taken to the town hall, where he was held under armed guard.

The building ceased to be the local seat of government in 1930 when Pembroke was annexed by Dublin in accordance with the Local Government (Dublin) Act 1930. It subsequently served as the home of Ringsend Technical School until 1951, when it became the offices of the City of Dublin Vocational Education Committee.
