= Ballsbridge =

Southside suburb of Dublin, Ireland

Ballsbridge Droichead na Dothra (Irish)
- Suburb
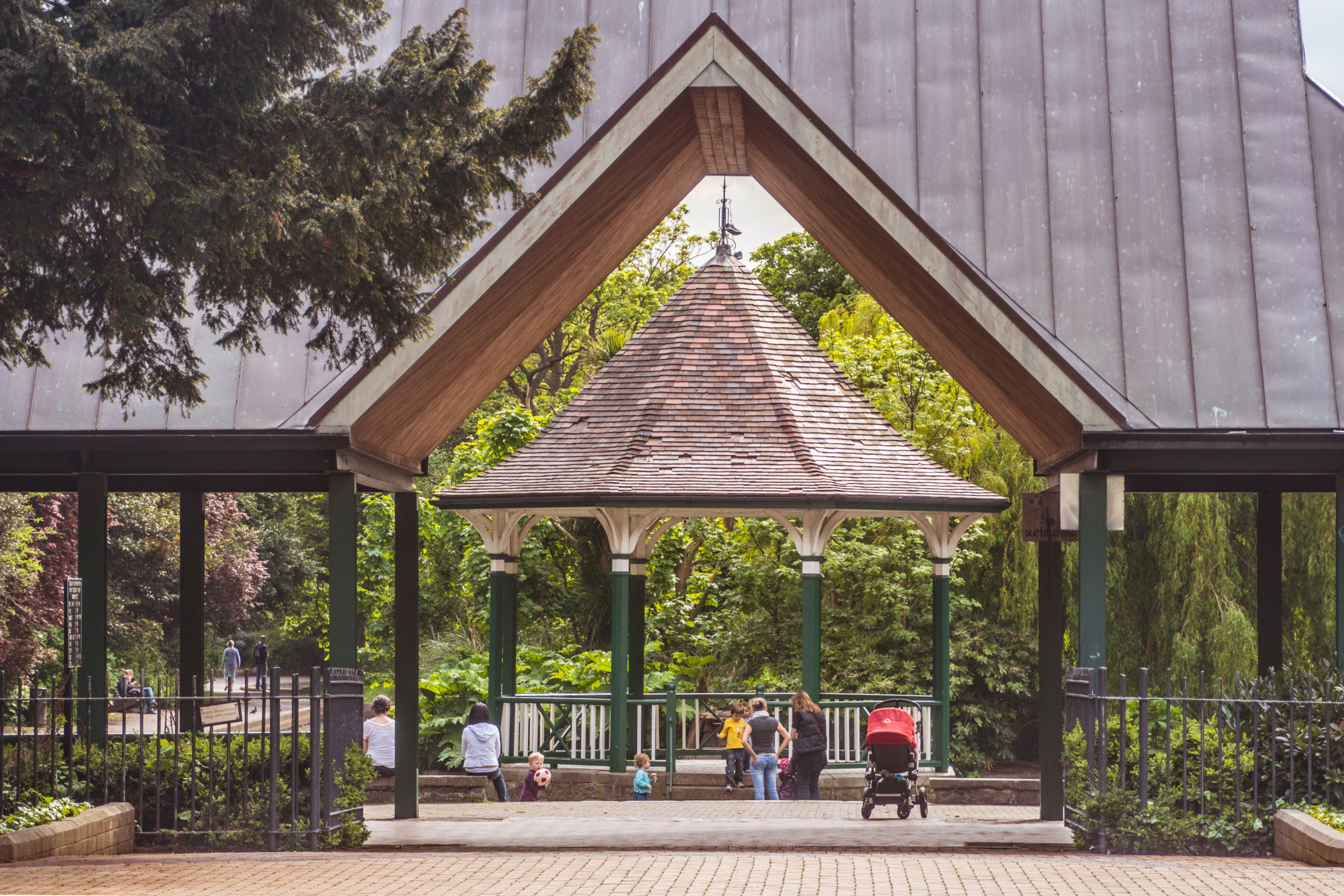
- Herbert Park is a prominent local amenity

- Location in Dublin
- Coordinates: 53.329°N 6.231°W
- Country: Ireland
- Province: Leinster
- Local authority: Dublin City Council
- EU Parliament Constituency: Dublin
- Eircode routing key: D04
- Dialing code: 01, +353 1

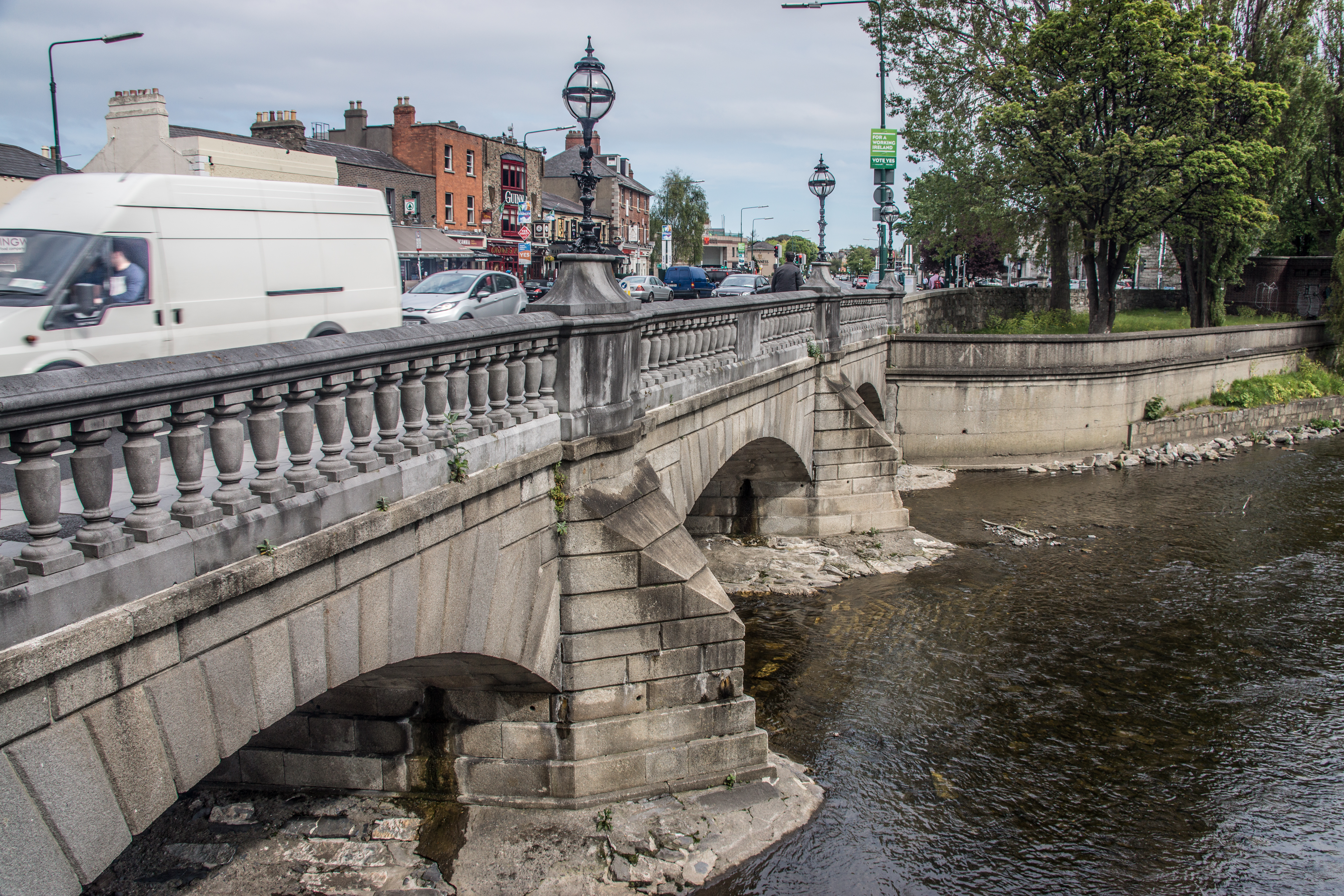
The bridge referred to as Ball's Bridge. This is not the original bridge of that name.

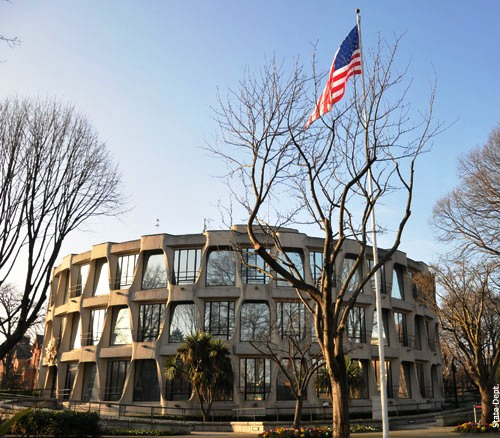
American embassy (Chancery), 2018

Ballsbridge (Irish: Droichead na Dothra, meaning 'Dodder bridge') (from historic Ball's Bridge) is an inner suburb of Dublin, Ireland. The area is largely situated north and west of a three-arch stone bridge across the River Dodder, on the south side of the city. The sign on the bridge still proclaims it as "Ball's Bridge", in recognition of the fact that the original bridge on that location was built and owned by the Ball family, a well-known Dublin merchant family in the 1500s and the 1600s. The current bridge was built in 1791.

Ballsbridge was once part of the Pembroke Township.

== History ==
18th-century maps show that the area of Dublin that is now Ballsbridge was originally mud flats and marsh, with many roads converging on a small village located around the bridge, and known already as Ballsbridge. Situated on the Dodder, this village had a ready source of power for small industries, including by the 1720s, a linen and cotton printers, and, by the 1750s, a paper mill and a gunpowder factory.

The land around Ballsbridge was rural and mostly belonged to the Earl of Pembroke. After the Royal Dublin Society (RDS) moved into its present site near Ballsbridge in 1879, the Earl of Pembroke began to develop these lands into suburban residential housing. The RDS held their first show on their new premises in the early 1880s. In 1903, the land formerly known as the 'Forty Acres' was given to the city by the Earl of Pembroke to establish Herbert Park.(The Earl of Pembroke's surname was Herbert.)

Until 1965, there was a well-known botanical garden on Landsdowne Road near Ballsbridge. The garden belonged to Trinity College, which had leased land from the Earl of Pembroke. In 1960, the original lease from the Pembroke Estate expired and was not renewed. After reducing their size considerably, Trinity decided, in 1965, to close the botanical gardens at that location and to open a new garden at Dartry. Two hotels now stand on the site.

In 1916, the Mount Street bridge, which spans the Grand Canal at the foot of Northumberland Road, was the site of an important battle during the Easter Rising. The O'Rahilly, one of the leaders of the Rising, lived at 40 Herbert Park. Another resistance leader, Eoin MacNeill, who refused to participate in the Rising, lived down the road at 19 Herbert Park.

== Popular culture ==
The date of 16 June 1904, now commemorated as Bloomsday, was chosen by the writer James Joyce for the setting of his novel Ulysses because it was the date on which he lost his virginity to his girlfriend Nora Barnacle - Joyce was renting a room at the time in a house at 60 Shelbourne Road.

In the 1940s and 1950s, the writer Brendan Behan lived in Ballsbridge, as did the poet Patrick Kavanagh, who lived at 62 Pembroke Road. Busts of Behan and Kavanagh are on display at two pubs along Pembroke Road, Searson's and the Wellington. Kavanagh wrote his famous poem On Raglan Road about a girl he met on that street in 1944.

== Buildings, structures and parks ==
The bridge itself forms the heart of the Ballsbridge suburb which extends northwards towards the Grand Canal along Northumberland Road up to Haddington Road and Shelbourne Road, southwards along the Merrion Road towards Merrion and along Anglesea Road towards Donnybrook, and westwards to encompass the area around Pembroke Road, Clyde Road, Elgin Road and Herbert Park. The bridge was extensively modernised and widened by 24 feet in 1900 by William Kaye-Parry.

Herbert Park, a public park, is thirty-two acres in size and is divided by a road, also called Herbert Park, and forms part of Ballsbridge's nebulous border with Donnybrook.

The Royal Dublin Society (RDS) has its grounds here, and the Lansdowne Road headquarters of the Irish Rugby Football Union (IRFU) is on the boundary between Ballsbridge and Irishtown. The corporate headquarters of Allied Irish Banks (AIB) are also located in Ballsbridge. The former Pembroke Town Hall is located to the immediate northwest of the RDS.

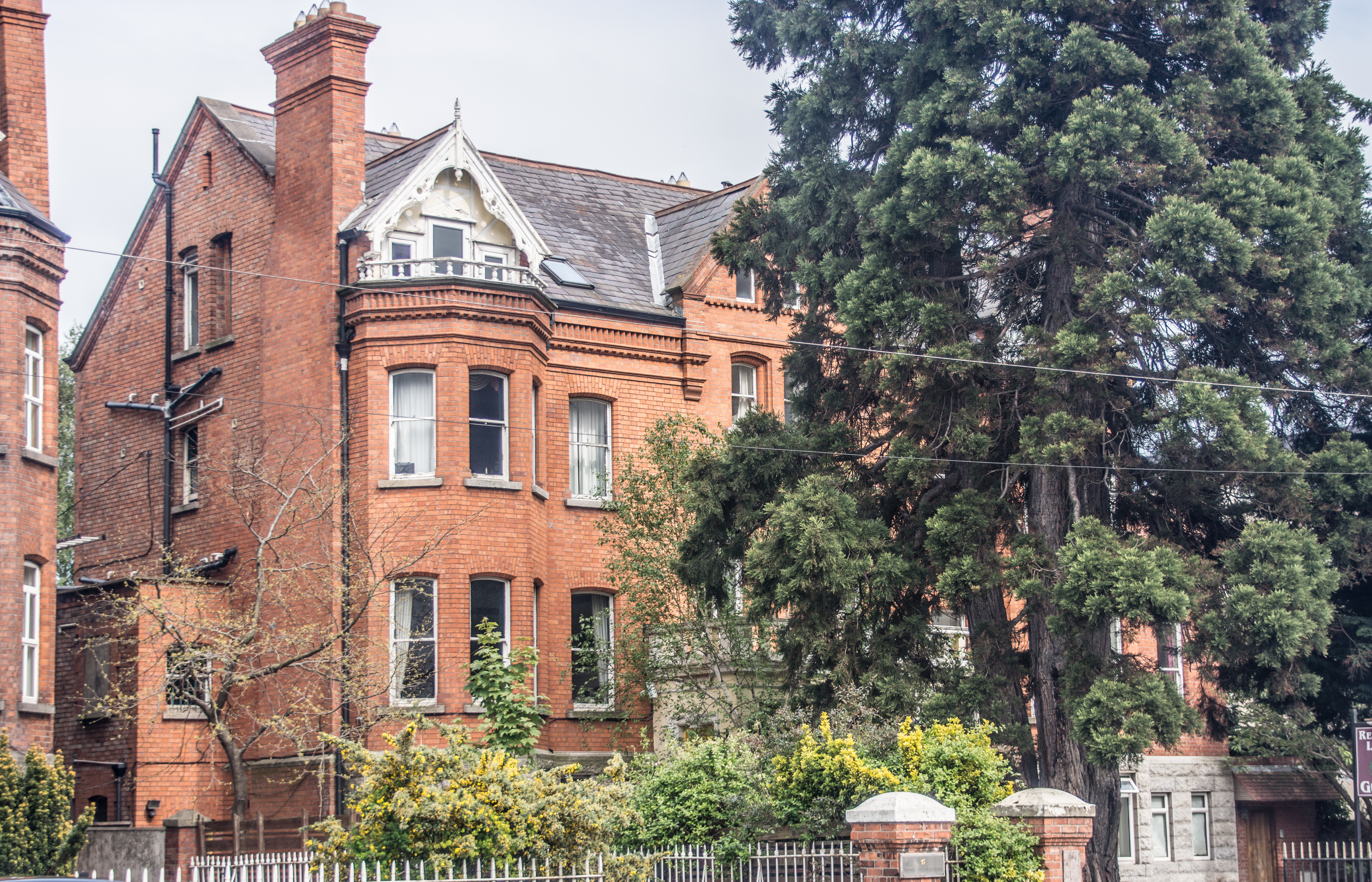
Ballsbridge features architecture from the Georgian, Victorian, and Edwardian periods and is known for its high property prices

Ailesbury Road, along with adjacent Shrewsbury Road, contains the most expensive properties in Dublin, and the roads are featured in the Irish edition of the board game Monopoly. Shrewsbury Road was the sixth most expensive street in the world in 2007.

Many of Dublin's embassies and diplomatic residences are located in the southern part of Ballsbridge on and around Ailesbury Road. The British, American, Italian, Spanish, Dutch and other embassies are located in the Ballsbridge area of Dublin.

The U.S. embassy, an iconic cylindrical building, is a major landmark in present-day Ballsbridge. It was designed in 1955 by John M. Johansen, Professor of Architecture at Yale University. The project was 9 years in incubation and the building was inaugurated in 1964.

Gurdwara Guru Nanak Darbar, the place of assembly and worship for the Irish Sikh community, is located on Serpentine Avenue. It is located on the site of the old Oscar Cinema which the community purchased in 1987.

== Transport ==
The DART train passes nearby, stopping at Lansdowne Road (which is also frequently served by commuter services) and Sandymount stations.

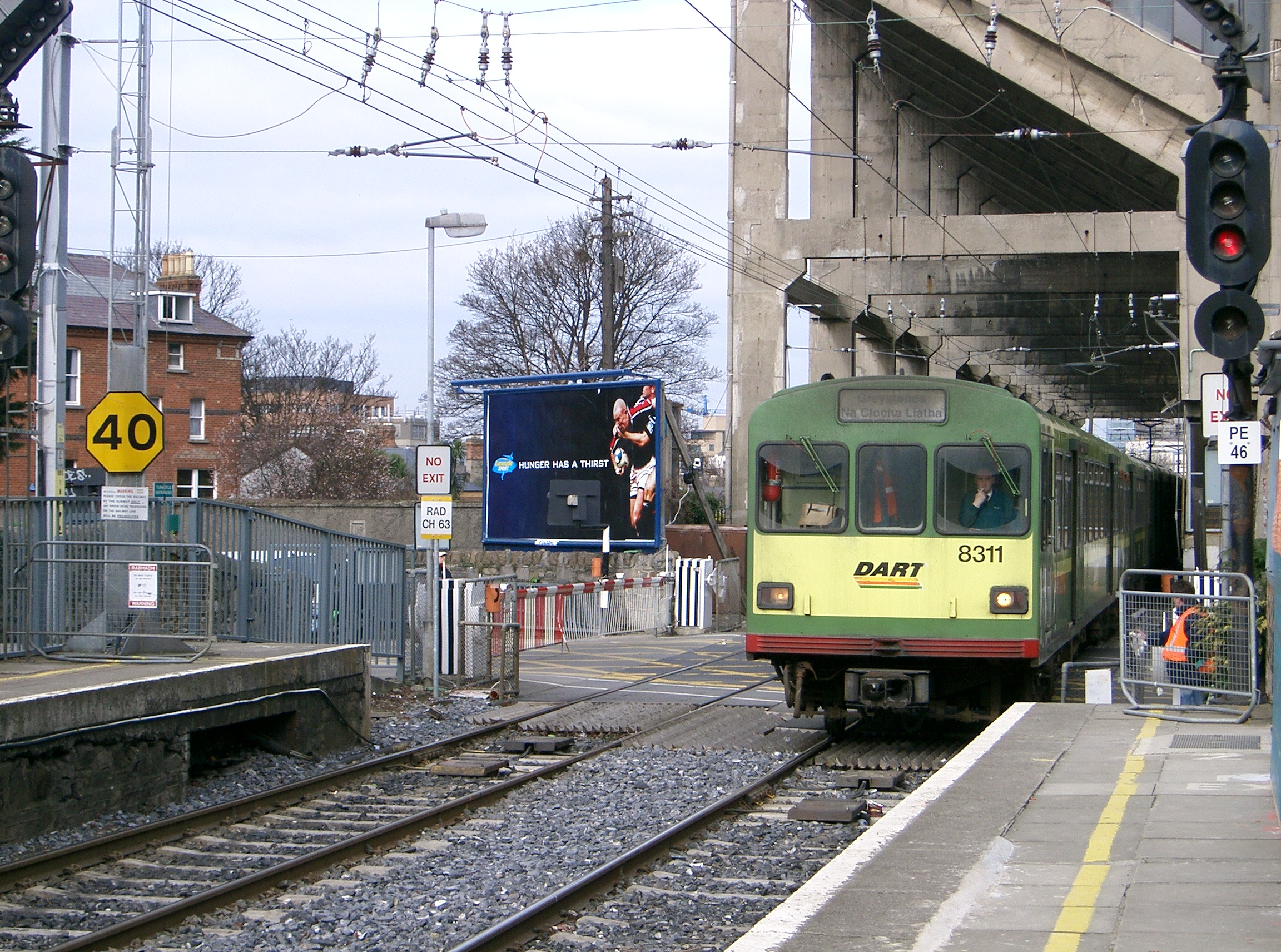
A DART train passes under the Lansdowne Road Rugby Stadium (since demolished and replaced by Aviva Stadium) and over the level crossing as it enters Lansdowne Road railway station, 2005

Ballsbridge used to be served by the Dublin tramways 6, 7 and 8, and also served as the terminus for tram line 5 back when Ballsbridge was still known as Pembroke. The tram lines were closed throughout the 1930s and 1940s and the 6, 7 and 8 were the last to close, with all three ending on 9 July 1949.

Ballsbridge is serviced by the following bus routes:

- 4 Ballymun to Monkstown
- 7 Cherrywood to Dublin
- 7a Loughlinstown to Dublin
- 18 Palmerstown to Sandymount
- 27X Clare Hall to Belfield

A number of services have been withdrawn due to Dublin Bus' Network Direct route restructuring programme.

== See also ==
- Aviva Stadium
- Marian College
- Sandymount
- St Bartholomew's Church, Dublin
- List of towns and villages in Ireland
