= Coolrain =

Village in County Laois, Ireland

Coolrain Cúil Ruáin
- Village
- Location in Ireland
- Coordinates: 52.9797°N 7.5686°W
- Country: Ireland
- Province: Leinster
- County: County Laois

Coolrain (Irish: Cúil Ruáin), is a village in County Laois, Ireland. It is situated near the Slieve Bloom Mountains. The nearest town is Mountrath, and the closest village is Camross.

In 1828 Coolrain was spelt Coleraine and was in the parish of Offerlane, Queens County (which is now called County Laois)

In 1855 Coolrain had a corn and flour mill, a dispensary and police barracks. The local pub, Sheeran's, dates from the 1790's. There is a playground in the village.

In 1901 the population of Coolrain's townlands, was 304, and by 1911 the population was 364. The townlands of Coolrain in 1901 and 1911 were: Anatrim/Anatrin, Coolnagour (1828 Colenagour), Coolrain (1828 Coleraine), Derryduff, Derrynaseera (1828 Dernaserea), Glebe, Larch Hill, Laurel Hill, Shanderry, Tinnakill (1828 Tennakilly).

Coolrain Sawmills is located 1.5km north of the village.

A charity tractor run, in aid of Clonenagh National School, takes place in the village each December. A syndicate based in the village owned the 2017 Irish Grand National winner, Our Duke. Stages of the Birr Endurance rally have taken place in the village.
