= Alice Ginnell =

Irish Republican activist

- Born: Mary Alice King; 24 September 1882; Gaybrook, County Westmeath
- Died: 2 August 1967 (aged 84); Edgeworthstown

Alice Ginnell (born Mary Alice King; 24 September 1882 – 2 August 1967) was a Republican activist and member of both Cumann na mBan and Sinn Féin. She was the first woman Election Agent in Ireland or Great Britain.

== Biography ==
Ginnell was born Mary Alice King to James and Georgina King in Kilbride House, Gaybrook near Mullingar, County Westmeath in 1882. She got her education from the Loreto Convent boarding school in Navan, County Meath. Ginnell was the second wife of Laurence Ginnell and married him on 30 January 1902 in Rochfortbridge, County Westmeath. She was active in politics and friends with Constance Markievicz and Maud Gonne.

In 1903 the couple lived in France for a time, on the run due to Laurence Ginnell's political activities. Her husband was the Irish Parliamentary Party MP for Westmeath North which brought the couple to London where Ginnell became a member of the local branch of Cumann na mBan. She was also a member of Sinn Féin. After the Easter Rising in 1916 Ginnell collected information about prisoners in Lewes and Aylesbury gaols which was used in propaganda and promotion. Ginnell also worked for the Irish National Relief Fund with Art O'Brien. She visited the women using the name "Mrs Jones" as a cover, She later traveled to the US under the same name. While they lived in London, Ginnell also worked as a translator. Up to 1916 she was working for the brokerage firm Lockie, Pemberton and Co.

In 1917 Ginnell returned to Ireland where she organized the Cumann na mBan branches in Meath, Westmeath and Rathmines in Dublin. In April that year a selection of women from the leading republican organisations founded the League of Women Delegates to demand women be represented amongst the Sinn Féin executive. Ginnell was secretary of the organisation and in October was nominated to the Sinn Féin executive along with Kathleen Clarke, Áine Ceannt, Jennie Wyse Power, Kathleen Lynn, and Helena Molony. In 1918 Ginnell was sent by Sinn Féin to Westmeath to help with running candidates in that constituency. She found such a lack of organisation that she ended up becoming the Election Agent. Ginnell was the first woman to hold this position.

Laurence Ginnell was elected to the Dáil and became Director of Propaganda. But in 1920 his health was poor and he took a leave of absence and both he and his wife were sent on a tour of the Americas. Mostly Ginnell travelled with her husband, but in December she went to New York to meet with Harry Boland and the MacSwineys. A year after the start of the tour of North America the couple arrived in South America where they acted as a diplomatic team. Ginnell herself only ran for election once, in the 1920 Pembroke Urban District Council election, and was unsuccessful.

An Anti-Treaty supporter, Ginnell was her husband's Election Agent in the 1922 elections. She then moved to the US to set up a ‘Public Stenographer’ office on Madison Avenue, New York and from there went to Washington. In D.C. Laurence Ginnell was de Valera's Anti-Treaty representative until he died suddenly in 1923. Ginnell returned to Ireland and took up a position as a translator in the Department of Industry and Commerce. She held that position until she retired. Ginnell died at the age of 86 at a Nursing Home in Edgeworthstown. Ginnell recorded her experiences in her diaries with her husband.
