= Robert William Jackson =

Deputy Surgeon-General Sir Robert Jackson LRCP FRCSI CB
- Born: 11 August 1827; Edenderry, Ireland
- Died: 12 May 1921 (aged 93); Sandymount, Ireland
- Spouse(s): Anne Simpson (m. 1860–1888) Gertrude Gelston (m. 1891)
- Children: 4
- Military career
- Allegiance: United Kingdom
- Branch: British Army
- Service years: 1854–1882
- Rank: Deputy Surgeon-general
- Unit: Army Medical Department
- Conflicts: Crimean War; Siege of Sevastopol; Indian Mutiny; Relief of Lucknow; Second Battle of Cawnpore; Capture of Lucknow; Third Anglo-Ashanti War; Battle of Amoaful; Battle of Ordashu; Anglo-Zulu War; Anglo-Egyptian War; Battle of Tel El Kebir
- Awards: Knight bachelor Order of the Medjidie (Ottoman)
- Memorials: St Patrick's Cathedral, Dublin

Deputy Surgeon-General Sir Robert William Jackson LRCP FRCSI CB (11 August 1827 – 12 May 1921) was a British Army surgeon. He was knighted at Windsor Castle on 30 November 1882.

Coat of arms of Robert William Jackson

Notes
Granted 3 February 1911 by George James Burtchaell, Deputy Ulster King of Arms.
Crest
A boar's head erased and erect Sable thereon an escutcheon Argent charged with the cross of Saint Patrick.
Torse
Of the colours.
Escutcheon
Sable on a fess between three boars' heads erased and erect Or as many ogresses.
Motto
Carpe Diem
