= Alice King (novelist) =

British writer (1839–1894)

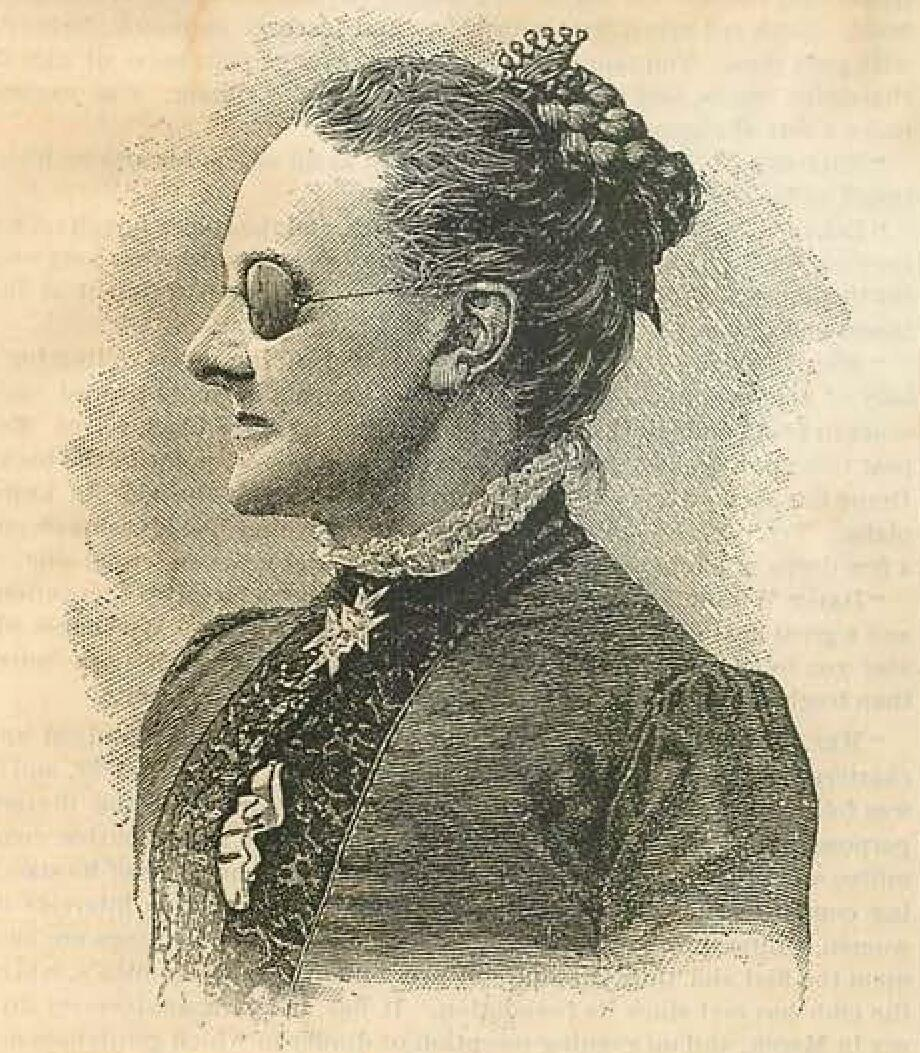
- Born: 28 March 1839; Cutcombe
- Died: 26 April 1894 (aged 55)
- Occupation: Writer
- Parent(s): John Myers King

Alice King (28 March 1839 – 26 April 1894) was a British writer, teacher, and public speaker. Blind since the age of seven, she published over a dozen novels.

== Life ==
King was born on 28 March 1839 in Cutcombe, Somerset, the youngest child of the Rev. John Myers King, Vicar of Cutcombe and a translator of Virgil. Born with poor and deteriorating eyesight, she went completely blind at age seven. Though she never learned Braille, she learned seven additional languages – French, German, Italian, Spanish, Hebrew, Greek, and Latin – by ear. She wrote with a typewriter (then a fairly new invention) with tactile keys.

She said that she published her first work when she was twelve helped by her father. Her early writing was done with the help of a local school child who would transcribe her words. She noted that they had a poor understanding of grammar and composition so she found it necessary to compose half a page or so in her head so that she could instruct her amenuensis. When her first typewriter arrived from America she had the letters carved into the keys, but this was not the perfect answer as she had no idea what shape letters were so she had to learn the shapes so that she could recognise them on the keys. She found the typewriter difficult but eventually she achieved speeds equal to someone writing by hand and she did not need the help of a sighted person to write.

With the help of Henry Morley, she was able to get her first novel published in her early 20s and used the proceeds to fund a stained glass window for the Church of St John, Cutcombe. In addition to publishing over a dozen novels, she contributed to publications like Argosy, The Quiver, and The Girl's Own Paper. She taught a community Bible class for as many as 80 people and guided them in organizing civic activities like a brass band and a cricket club. Her work was highly regarded by author Charles Dickens.

She died as a spinster around late April 1894 at her residence at Minehead. She was taken ill the day before a planned visit to Clifton with her sister, but died several days later.

== Bibliography ==
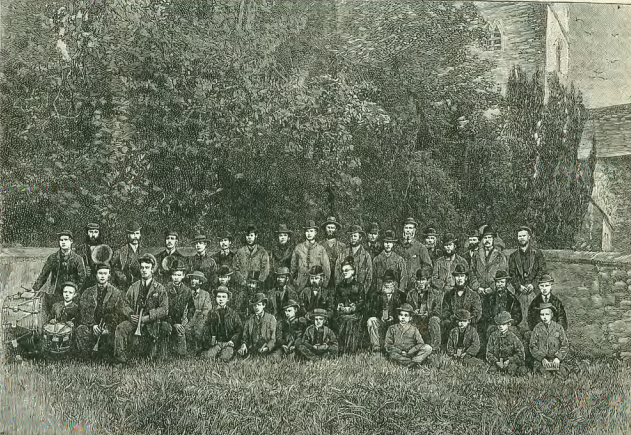
Alice King surrounded by her community Bible class in 1887

- Forest Keep. 3 vol. London: Hurst and Blackett, 1862.
- Eveline. 3 vol. London: Hurst and Blackett, 1863.
- The Lady of Winburne. 3 vol. London: Hurst and Blackett, 1865.
- Sir Tristram's Will. 3 vol. London: Hurst and Blackett, 1867.
- Queen of Herself. 3 vol. London: Hurst and Blackett, 1871.
- The Woman with a Secret. 3 vol. London: Hurst and Blackett, 1872.
- Spell-Bound. 3 vol. London: Hurst and Blackett, 1874.
- Hearts or Coronets. 3 vol. London: Hurst and Blackett, 1876.
- Twice Loved. 3 vol. London: Hurst and Blackett, 1878.
- Fettered Yet Free. 3 vol. London: Hurst and Blackett, 1883.
- The Strange Story at Lee. 1 vol. London: Hamilton, 1887.
- A Strange Tangle. 1 vol. London: John Maxwell, 1887.
- The Lady Elfrida's Escape. 1 vol. London: R. T. S., 1889.
