= Pembroke, Dublin =

Former local government area in the suburbs of Dublin, Ireland (1863–1930)

Pembroke Peambróg or Pembróc
- Interactive map of Pembroke
- Country: Ireland
- Province: Leinster
- County: County Dublin
- Established: 1863
- Abolished: 1930
- Named for: Earl of Pembroke

Government
  - Local authority: Pembroke Town Commissioners (1863–1899); Pembroke Urban District Council (1899–1930)
- Pembroke

Pembroke Township Act 1863
- Act of Parliament
- Parliament of the United Kingdom
- Long title: An Act for the Improvement of Pembroke Township, comprising Baggotrath, Donnybrook, Sandymount, Ringsend, and Irishtown, in the Barony of Dublin and County of Dublin.
- Citation: 26 & 27 Vict. c. lxxii

Dates
- Royal assent: 22 June 1863

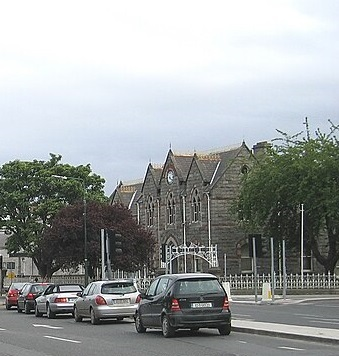
Pembroke Town Hall

Pembroke is a former local government area within County Dublin that was adjoining the city of Dublin, Ireland. It was formed as a township for local government purposes by a local act of Parliament, the Pembroke Township Act 1863 (26 & 27 Vict. c. lxxii). The township took its name from the fact that most of the area was part of the estate of the Earl of Pembroke. It was governed by town commissioners until 1899 when it became an urban district. In 1930 Pembroke was absorbed by the City and County Borough of Dublin.

== Composition ==
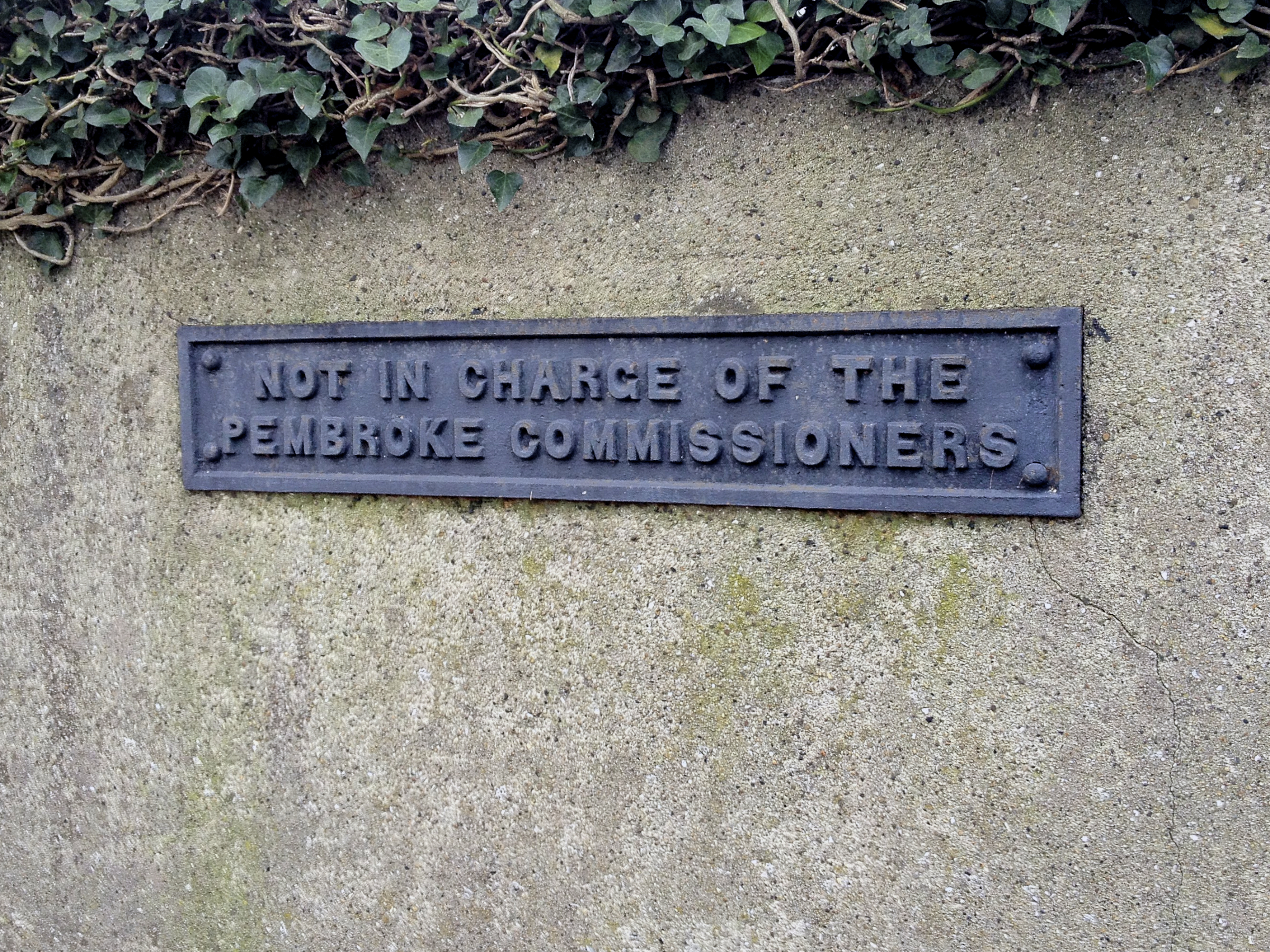
A wall-plaque from the days of The Pembroke Commissioners

The township consisted of a number of distinct areas: Ballsbridge, Donnybrook, Sandymount, Irishtown and Ringsend. The areas varied in nature, with Ringsend being an old fishing village, Irishtown a working-class residential and industrial district, while the remainder of the township contained affluent residential areas. Seven-ninths of the township was part of the Pembroke Estate, and the agent of the estate was an ex officio commissioner, the remaining 14 being elected by property owners. The estate had a great deal of influence on the activities of the commissioners, and also made donations of land for the use of the township. This influence largely ended when a more democratically elected urban district council replaced the commissioners. In 1899, it became an urban district under the Local Government (Ireland) Act 1898.

=== Electoral history ===
Election	Control	Administration
1899	Unionist	Unionist
1902	Unionist	Unionist
1905	Unionist	Unionist
1908	Unionist	Unionist
1911	Nationalist	Nationalist
1914	Nationalist	Nationalist
1920	NOC	Unionist-Ratepayer
1925		
1928		

== Town Hall ==
Pembroke Town Hall was built on Merrion Road, Ballsbridge, and opened in 1880. Previously the township offices had been in nearby Ballsbridge Terrace. The town hall later formed the administrative headquarters of the City of Dublin Vocational Education Committee.

== Dissolution ==
Under the Local Government (Dublin) Act 1930, Pembroke Urban District was dissolved and its area was added to the functional area of the city of Dublin.

== Continued use of name ==
The library run by Dublin City Council in Ballsbridge is called Pembroke Library. It is also the name of a local electoral area for elections to Dublin City Council.
