= List of towns and villages in County Dublin =

List of towns and villages in a county of Ireland

This is a list of towns and villages in County Dublin, Ireland, many of which are suburbs of Dublin city.

== A ==
- Adamstown
- Artane
- Ashtown
- Athgoe

== B ==
- Balbriggan
- Baldoyle
- Balgriffin
- Ballinteer
- Ballsbridge
- Ballyboden
- Ballybrack
- Ballybough
- Ballyboughal
- Ballyfermot
- Ballygall
- Ballymount
- Ballymun
- Ballyroan
- Balrothery
- Barnacullia
- Bayside
- Beaumont
- Belfield
- Blackrock
- Blanchardstown
- Bluebell
- Bohernabreena
- Booterstown
- Brittas
- Broadstone

== C ==
- Cabinteely
- Cabra
- Carrickmines
- Castleknock
- Chapelizod
- Cherrywood
- Cherry Orchard
- Churchtown
- Citywest
- Clondalkin
- Clongriffin
- Clonsilla
- Clonskeagh
- Clontarf
- Clonturk
- Coolmine
- Coolock
- Corduff
- Cornelscourt
- Crumlin

== D ==
- Dalkey
- Damastown
- Darndale
- Dartry
- Deansgrange
- Dollymount
- Dolphin's Barn
- Donabate
- Donaghmede
- Donnybrook
- Donnycarney
- Drimnagh
- Drumcondra
- Dún Laoghaire
- Dundrum

== E ==
- East Wall
- Edmondstown

== F ==
- Fairview
- Finglas
- Firhouse
- Foxrock

== G ==
- Garristown
- Glasnevin
- Glasthule
- Glencullen
- Glenageary
- Goatstown
- Grangegorman

== H ==
- Harold's Cross
- Hollystown
- Howth

== I ==
- Inchicore
- Irishtown
- Islandbridge

== J ==
- Jobstown
- Johnstown

== K ==
- Kill O' The Grange
- Kilbarrack
- Killester
- Killiney
- Kilmacud
- Kilmainham
- Kilnamanagh
- Kilternan
- Kimmage
- Kinsealy
- Knocklyon

== L ==
- Leopardstown
- The Liberties
- Loughlinstown
- Loughshinny
- Lucan
- Lusk

== M ==
- Malahide
- Marino
- Merrion
- Milltown
- Monkstown
- Mount Merrion
- Mulhuddart

== N ==
- Newcastle
- Naul
- North Strand
- North Wall

== O ==
- Oldbawn
- Oldtown
- Ongar

== P ==
- Palmerstown
- Perrystown
- Phibsborough
- Poppintree
- Portmarnock
- Portobello
- Portrane

== R ==
- Raheny
- Ranelagh
- Rathcoole
- Rathfarnham
- Rathgar
- Rathmichael
- Rathmines
- Rialto
- Ringsend
- Roebuck
- Rockbrook
- Rolestown
- Rush

== S ==
- Saggart
- Sallynoggin
- Sandycove
- Sandyford
- Sandymount
- Santry
- Shankill
- Skerries
- Smithfield
- Stepaside
- Stillorgan
- Stoneybatter
- Sutton
- Swords

== T ==
- Tallaght
- Templeogue
- Terenure
- The Coombe
- Ticknock
- Tyrrelstown

== W ==
- Walkinstown
- Whitechurch
- Whitehall
- Windy Arbour

== See also ==
- List of towns and villages in the Republic of Ireland
