= Art O'Neill Challenge =

Annual race in Ireland held since 2009

Coordinates: 53.03125°N 6.45400°W

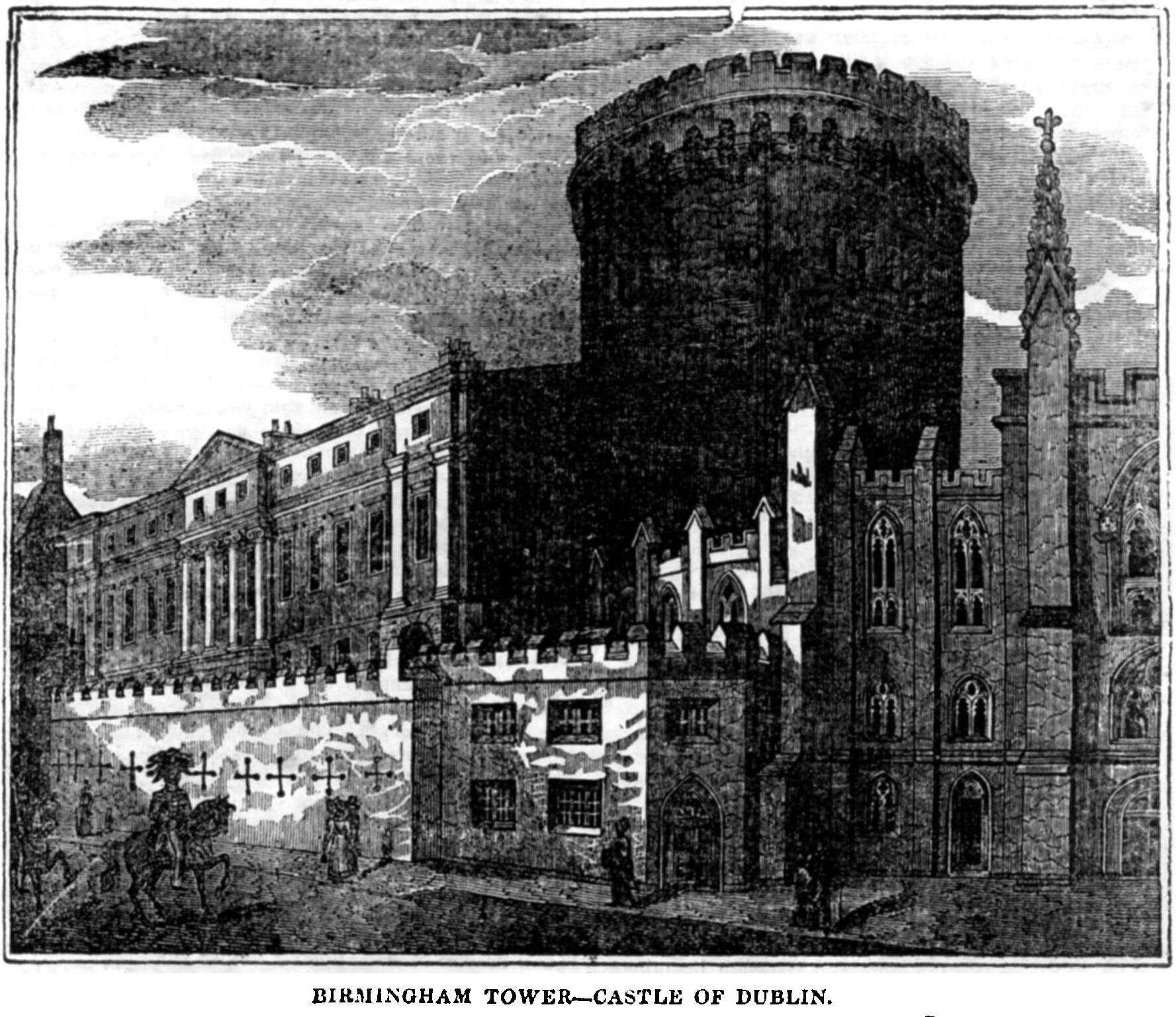
- The Bermingham Tower at Dublin Castle, from whence a 1592 escape was effected that is commemorated today by the Art O'Neill Challenge
- Date: Annually in January
- Location: County Dublin and County Wicklow, Ireland
- Event type: Ultramarathon; Road running Mountain running aka Fell running Mountain hiking
- Distance: 65 km (40 mi) (as of 2026)
- Established: 2009 (17 years ago)
- Course records: Men's: 4:51:06 (2019) (Germany) Florian Reichert; Women's: 7:05:00 (2015) (Republic of Ireland) Suzanne Kenny
- Website: The Art O'Neill
- Participants: 200 (Art O'Neill Challenge); 200 (AON Pursuit)

The Art O'Neill Challenge, also known as the AON Challenge, the Art O'Neill Ultra or simply The Art O'Neill, is an approximately 60 kilometre Irish ultramarathon overnight endurance race that begins at Dublin Castle, at nighttime, and finishes at Glenmalure in the Wicklow Mountains the following day. The event takes place annually in the month of January, starting on a Friday night, and ends the following day.

The event recreates the Elizabethan era escape of Red Hugh O'Donnell and brothers Art and Henry O'Neill from Dublin Castle on 6 January 1592, and the subsequent journey by Art and Red Hugh to Glenmalure. Shortly after the trio were free of the castle, Henry O'Neill was separated from the pair and went his own direction, eventually returning safely to Ulster. O'Donnell and Art, however, alongside a guide sent to help them, continued south to the rural valley of Glenmalure, a rebel stronghold where they knew they would find safety. The men undertook the lengthy journey from Dublin by foot in the middle of winter wearing wholly unsuitable 16th century clothing and footwear consisting of linens and tunics. Along the journey over the mountains, Art O'Neill died of exposure, whilst O'Donnell survived, but lost both big toes to frostbite.

As of the 2026 event, the Art O'Neill Challenge (consisting of Trek, Hybrid and Run categories) is capped at a limit of 200 entrants, who are selected by a lottery process in the months leading up to the event. The 2026 event saw the introduction of a non-refundable fee to enter the lottery. Once selected, each successful applicant is required to pay a fee to secure their place. Since 2023, a shorter event named the AON Pursuit has taken place alongside the main AON Challenge on the same night, but only covers the first 25 km of the route, and is only open to runners. An additional 200 entrants compete in the AON Pursuit, bringing the total number of competitors to 400. The volunteer rescue service Dublin & Wicklow Mountain Rescue have been the organiser and sole beneficiary of the event since 2018.

The challenge has been completed by at least one runner in less than 5 hours, whereas it typically takes walkers "anywhere between twelve and seventeen hours" to complete. The event has been described by History Ireland as a "unique endeavour that combines history, hill-walking, mountain-running, élite international ultra-running and tourism".

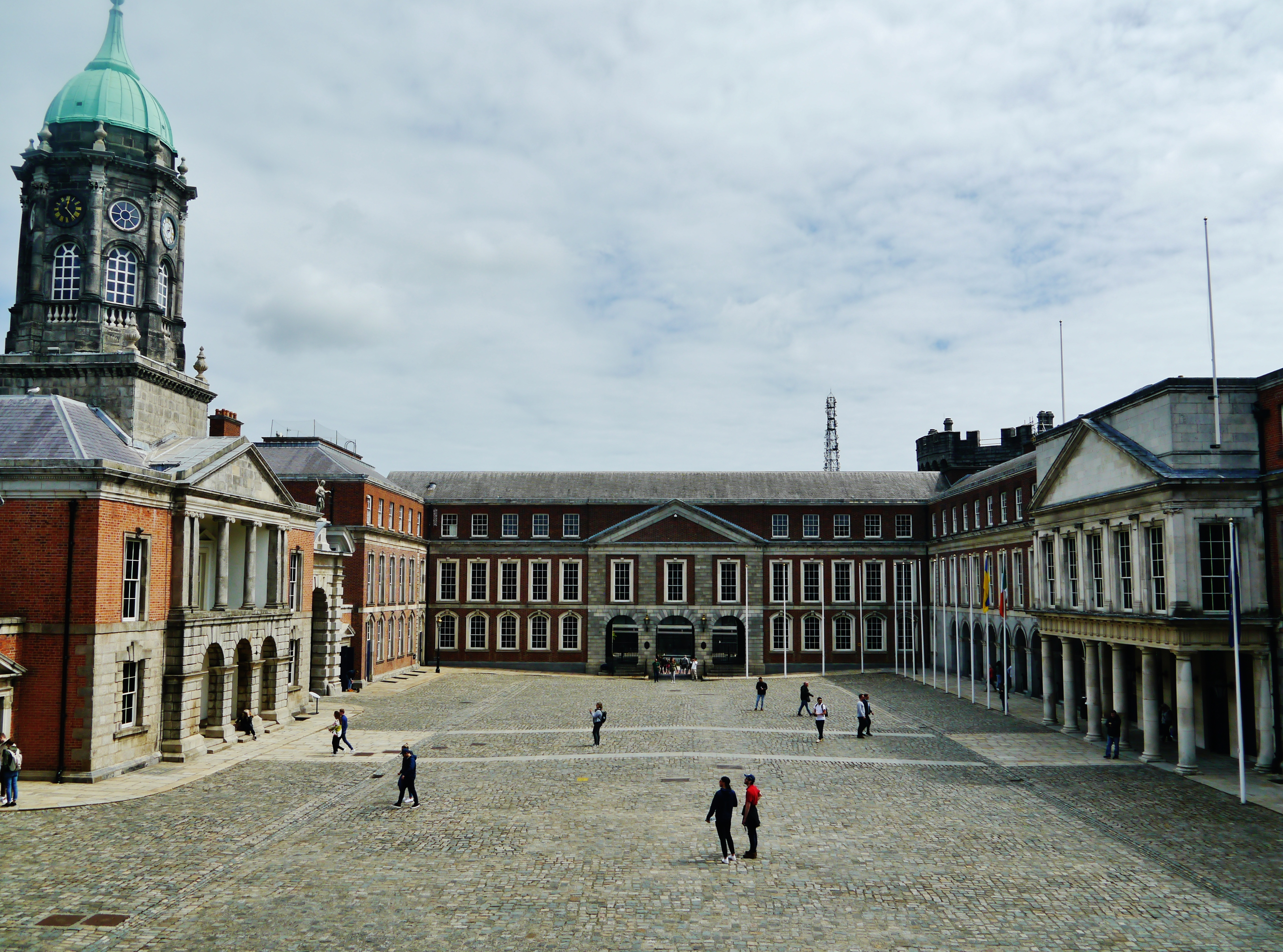
The inner courtyard of Dublin Castle in 2022

== History ==
=== 1592 escape ===
The Lord Deputy of Ireland Sir John Perrot arrested Art O'Neill and imprisoned him in Dublin Castle in 1585, it being the seat of British rule in Ireland. In December of 1585, Art O'Neill made a successful escape from the castle and "hid for a time in the Wicklow mountains, but, attempting to head north to Ulster, he was recaptured before 20 February 1586", according to the Dictionary of Irish Biography. In 1586, Art and his brother Henry O'Neill were imprisoned in Dublin Castle. Hugh Roe O'Donnell was kidnapped in late 1587 and was imprisoned in Dublin Castle's Bermingham Tower, where state prisoners were held. On 6 January 1592, coinciding with the day of the Feast of the Epiphany, the three men successfully escaped from the castle together. When the three prisoners were unshackled to eat, they took advantage of the gaolers.

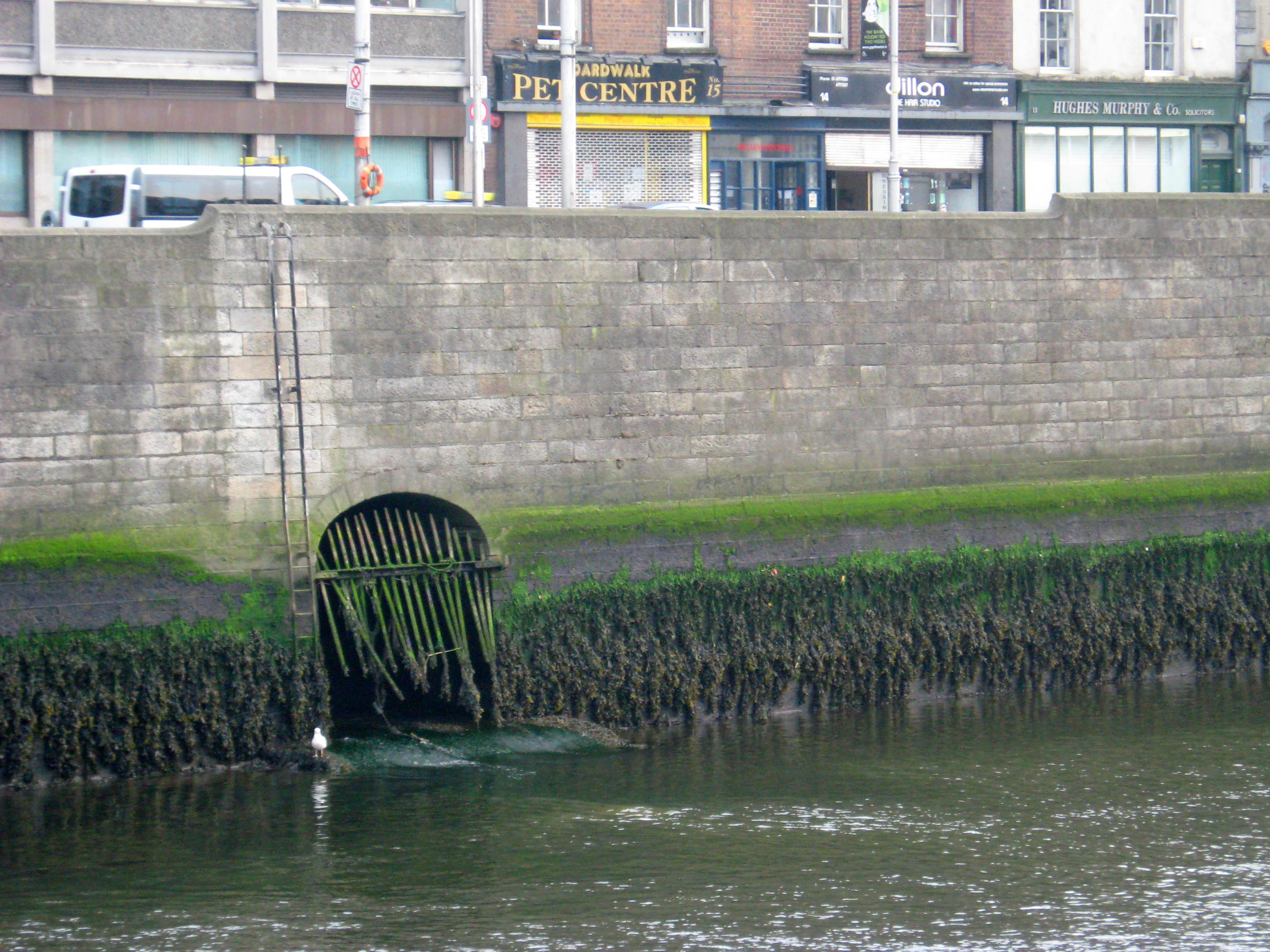
Picture of the River Poddle emptying into the River Liffey at Wellington Quay, Dublin

In an Irish Times article by Frank McNally, it was noted that the men began their escape through the vertical toilet chute of a garderobe at the top of an unspecified tower at Dublin Castle, after which they negotiated their way through the River Poddle, which was at that point used as a sewer. McNally alludes to Red Hugh O'Donnell having been imprisoned in the "high-security" Record Tower, but makes no note of the location in which the O'Neill brothers were kept. Darren McGettigan, author of Red Hugh O'Donnell and the Nine Years War, notes that the three men escaped through a 'privy' into the castle moat.

Hugh O'Neill, Earl of Tyrone (c. 1550 – 1616) was instrumental in helping the men to effect their 1592 escape. Historian Jonathan Bardon contends that O'Neill organised the escape, and McNally notes that Tyrone probably achieved this by bribing Dublin Castle staff. Historian Hiram Morgan notes that Lord Deputy William FitzWilliam was most likely the recipient of this bribe, though this has never been conclusively proven. Prior to O'Donnell's imprisonment his family had allied with Tyrone. Tyrone aimed to release O'Donnell so O'Donnell could succeed his senile father Hugh McManus O'Donnell and provide Tyrone with much-needed military assistance. Tyrone placed so much importance on O'Donnell's escape that he was willing to allow Art and Henry, his family's enemies, to escape as well.

The men first needed to "scramble down a chute with an improvised rope" during which Art accidentally fell and injured his foot. Despite the injury, the group continued on, successfully crossing the River Dodder, and escaped beyond the city walls of what was at that point still a comparatively small city. Once clear of danger, Henry O'Neill was either separated from the other two by accident, or else split from them on purpose. According to the Annals of the Four Masters:

The darkness of the night, and the hurry of their flight (from dread of pursuit), separated the eldest of them from the rest, namely, Henry O'Neill. Hugh was the greenest of them with respect to years, but not with respect to prowess. They were grieved at the separation of Henry from them; but, however, they proceeded onwards, their servant guiding them along...

On the 430th anniversary of the escape in 2022, the official Facebook account of the Art O'Neill Challenge described the escape thus:

At the time of the escape Dublin was a town roughly corresponding to the present day Liberties. People lived outside the walls, within the area known as the Pale, but there was little by way of roads or byways to other towns. The Dublin and Wicklow mountains were unmapped and largely inaccessible, and were used as safe areas for Irish clans resisting English rule. Deep in the southern Wicklow Mountains one of the most secure of these areas was Glenmalure, which was the stronghold of Feagh McHugh O'Byrne, a powerful Chieftain, who carried out many raids within the Pale, and was a major thorn in the side of the Crown forces. Dublin at the time had a massive network of rivers and marshes all the way across what we know as south and west County Dublin, and river courses and fording points would have been crucial to any route from Dublin Castle to Glenmalure, particularly in the middle of winter. The River Poddle ran behind Dublin Castle, emptying into the Dubh Linn - Black Pool, which gave the town its name - nearby. This river would have been an essential navigation aid to the original escapees.

Cartographer John Speed's 1610 map of Dublin, completed less than twenty years after the escape, gives some indication of the size and limits of the city at the time.

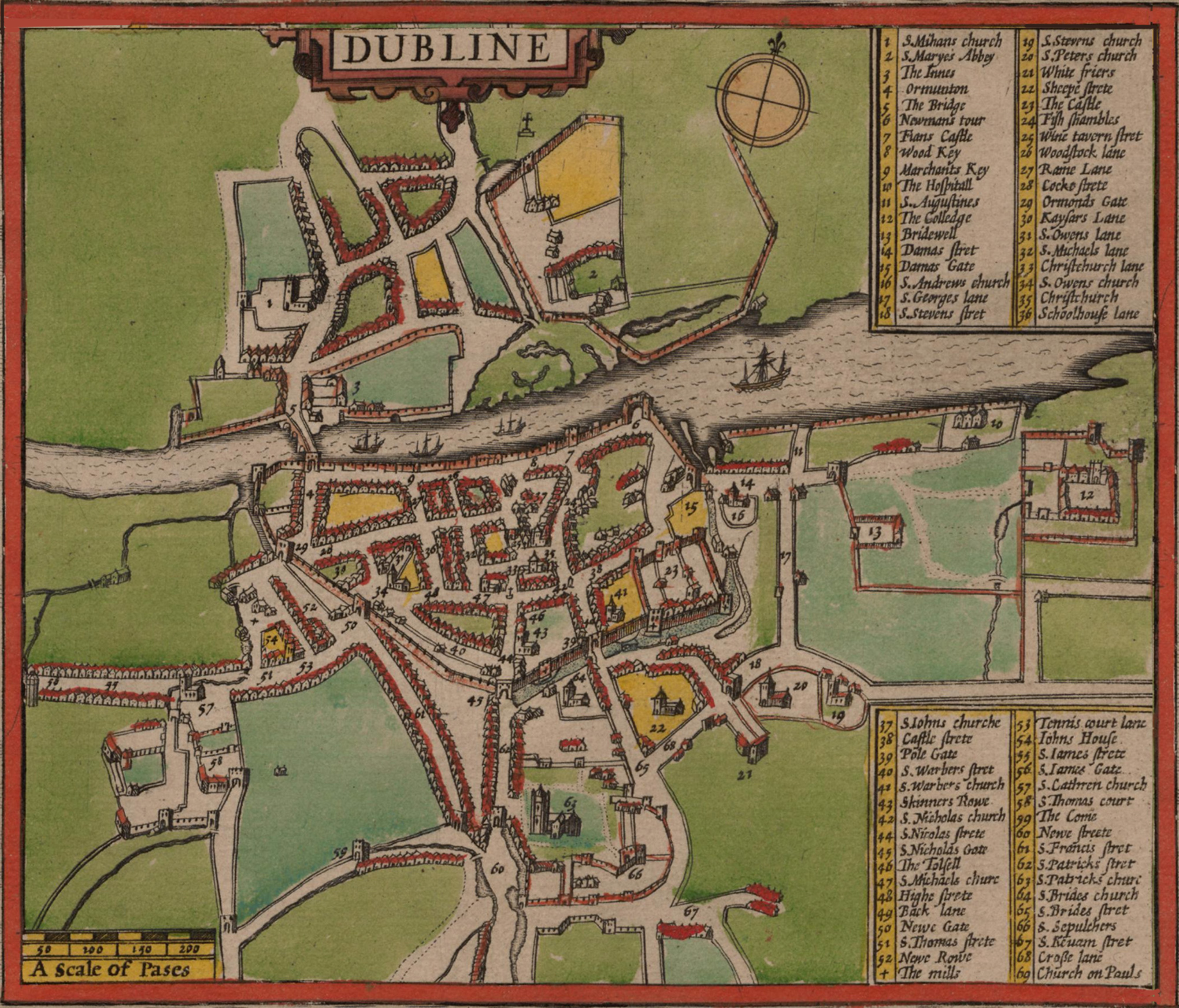
Colourised version of John Speed's 1610 map of Dublin

Horses were supposed to have been provided to facilitate a faster and less tiring escape to Glenmalure, however these did not materialise, and the group were forced to continue by foot notwithstanding Art's injury. A gaoler's servant named Edward Eustace was sent to help the men, with whom they journeyed southwest through the outlying County Dublin villages (modern-day suburbs) of Harold's Cross, Kimmage, Templeogue, Firhouse, and Ballyboden before successfully crossing the boundary out of the area in which English law applied. Both Lughaidh Ó Cléirigh (O'Donnell's biographer) and the Annals of the Four Masters imply that Edward Eustace was the guide who escorted Hugh Roe from Dublin to Glenmalure. In contrast, O'Sullivan Beare implies that the guide, who was "sent by Fiach [O'Byrne]", was not Eustace. Alfred Webb claims that Turlough O'Hagan (one of Tyrone's men) was the guide who escorted Hugh Roe from Dublin to Glenmalure. but Hiram Morgan and Darren McGettigan clarify that though O'Hagan escorted O'Donnell back to Ulster, he was not the guide that escorted the prisoners to Glenmalure.

Glenmalure was at that point the stronghold of Fiach MacHugh O'Byrne, an ally of the O'Neill's, and a place in which they knew they would be given sanctuary. According to the Annals of the Four Masters, Glenmalure was considered "a secure and impregnable valley; and many prisoners who escaped from Dublin were wont to resort to that valley, for they considered themselves secure there, until they could return to their own country."

At this time Ireland, along with the rest of Europe, was in the midst of a period known as the Grindelwald Fluctuation (1560s-1630s), part of what is now known as the Little Ice Age which made the climate colder than usual. During their escape, Art and Hugh were caught in heavy rain and snow. Art was also "physically weak and malnourished from years of imprisonment", however another source claims he was "stout and heavy" during the escape. According to McGettigan, Art and Red Hugh eventually had to pause at a rock some kilometres from their ultimate destination, owing to exhaustion. Their guide (named Edward Hughes according to McGettigan), continued onwards to Glenmalure valley to fetch help from O'Byrne, who sent men back with food and beer to the location. An 1888 entry in Irish Monthly magazine summarised the scene that befell the rescuers:

When aid came to them from Wicklow, "their bodies," say the ancient Annals of the Four Masters, "were covered with white-bordered shrouds of hailstones freezing round them, and no life was found in their members." Art indeed was dead, but Hugh survived...

The Dictionary of Irish Biography contends that O'Neill was not totally dead by the time help reached them, but rather that he was "extremely ill". Nonetheless, he died "soon afterwards and was buried in the Wicklow Mountains near Glenmalure". O'Donnell, on the other hand, went on to become one of the main leaders in the Nine Years' War against Tudor rule in Ireland.

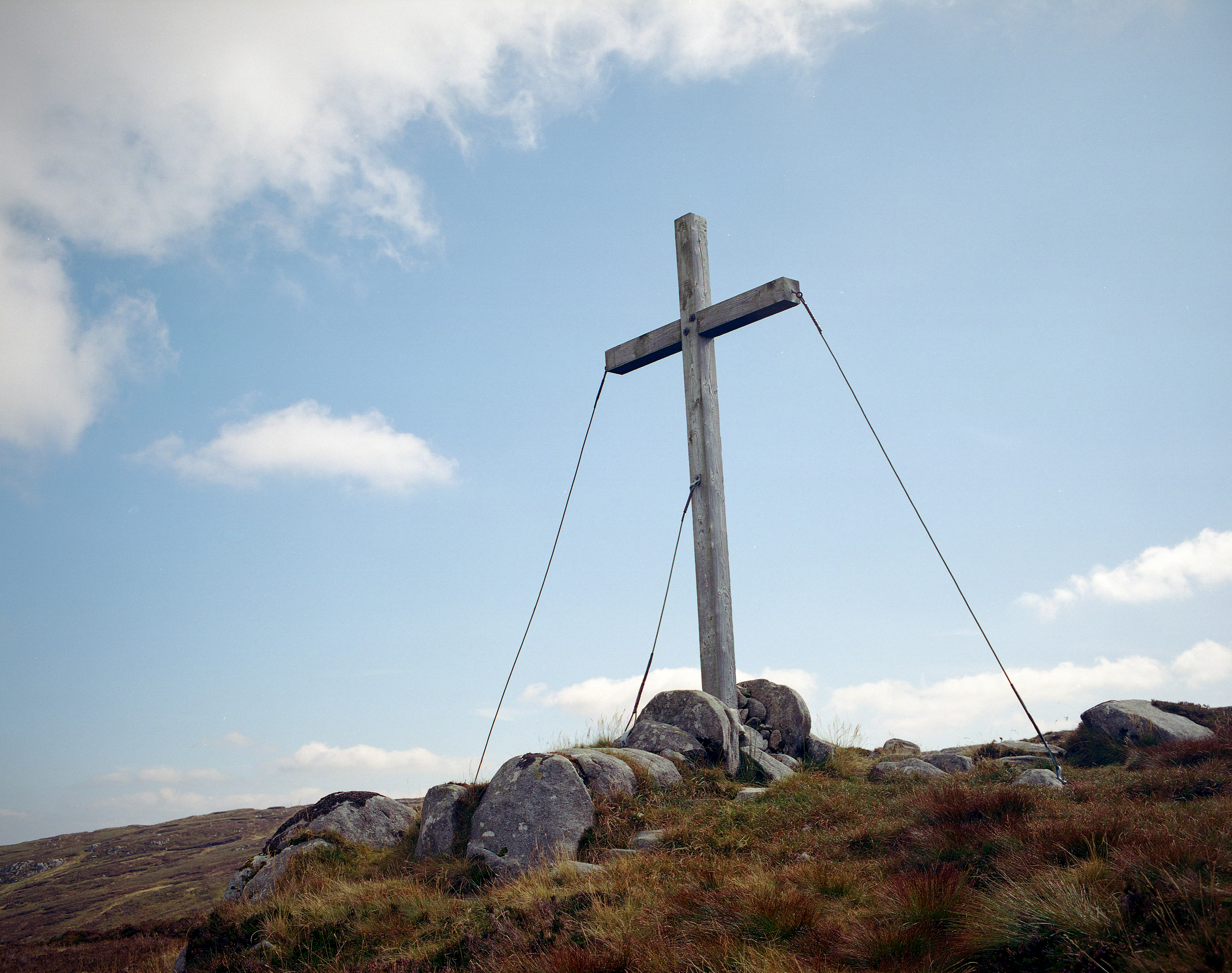
Art's Cross, pictured in 2014

A large wooden cross was erected in 1932 on a prominent point on Conavalla mountain, reputedly marking the point where "it is believed (Art O'Neill) lies buried". A commemorative plaque is also affixed to a large boulder some distance downhill of the cross, which reputedly marks the point where he died. These points are known respectively as Art's Cross and Art's Plaque. Art's Plaque is also sometimes known as Art's Grave.

EastWest Mapping, an Enniscorthy-based cartographic service that produces maps for hillwalkers, contends that the men were blocked at an area known as the 'Flags of Glanree' where they were forced, owing to exhaustion, "to rest under the shelter of a high rocky precipice". They note that:

...they should have followed up the Glanreebeg valley and gone via the Asbawn to get to Glenmalure... Instead the reasoning goes that they veered left and went up into Glanreemore, whence they hit upon the Flags and could go no further [..] It must be said though that this steep ground is not a complete barrier – they weren't trapped by a wall of rocks, they could quite easily have climbed the back of the valley and regained their route. Of course the guide may not have known this and perhaps also the men were too exhausted at this stage to retreat and regain the correct route...

Annie M. P. Smithson, an Irish novelist, summarised the escape in the Dublin Historical Record of September 1943 with the following account:

(Red Hugh O'Donnell) and the other two with him escaped by a rope into the common sewer of the Castle, and so into the Poddle river which enclosed the Castle on that side. When clear of the city, accompanied by a faithful servant, they made their way to the mountains and reached Fassaroe, keeping clear of the O'Toole clan by whom O'Donnell had been betrayed on his first escape (in 1591). It must have been a frightful journey. The weather was bitterly cold, with driving rain which turned to heavy snow. Henry O'Neill became separated from the others, and Art O'Neill, who was a stout, heavy man, was soon unable to make any head way against the snowstorm blowing in their teeth. Red Hugh and his servant carried him as long as they were able, but they were soon compelled to rest under the shelter of a projecting rock. After a while Hugh sent his servant to the O'Byrne of Wicklow, then in arms against the English. The man must have had a terrible time getting to O'Byrne, but he did reach him at last, and the Wicklow chieftain, having heard his story, at once sent some of his people back with him to the spot where he had left his master and Art O'Neill. With them they brought food and clothes. When they arrived at the place they could find neither Red Hugh nor Art O'Neill—there seemed to be no trace of them. But it was soon discovered that they were there—covered with snow. When the men dug them out of the drift, Art O'Neill, as we know, was dead, and Red Hugh near death. After some time the rescuers were able to get him on to a horse and bring him safely to O'Byrne's stronghold amongst the Wicklow hills...

Some sources claim that O'Donnell and O'Neill brothers were the only people on record to have ever escaped from Dublin Castle during its period under English rule, however it is known that at least one other person, Sir Edmund Butler of Cloughgrenan, also did so in November of 1569. On that occasion the escape was also achieved by means of climbing down a rope.

==== 430th anniversary re-enactment ====
On 6 January 2022, the 430th anniversary of the escape, two men named Don Hannon and Paul O'Callaghan completed a period-authentic reenactment of the journey from Dublin Castle to Glenmalure, departing the castle at midnight. The two men wore "only period-relevant clothing and footwear, and carr(ied) no food, water, lights, navigation, or other equipment" with them. Their clothing consisted of knee-high leather boots, wool trousers, a linen tunic, wool and leather jacket, wool cloak and a wool hood. For safety, both men carried live trackers, with which their location was monitored by organisers.

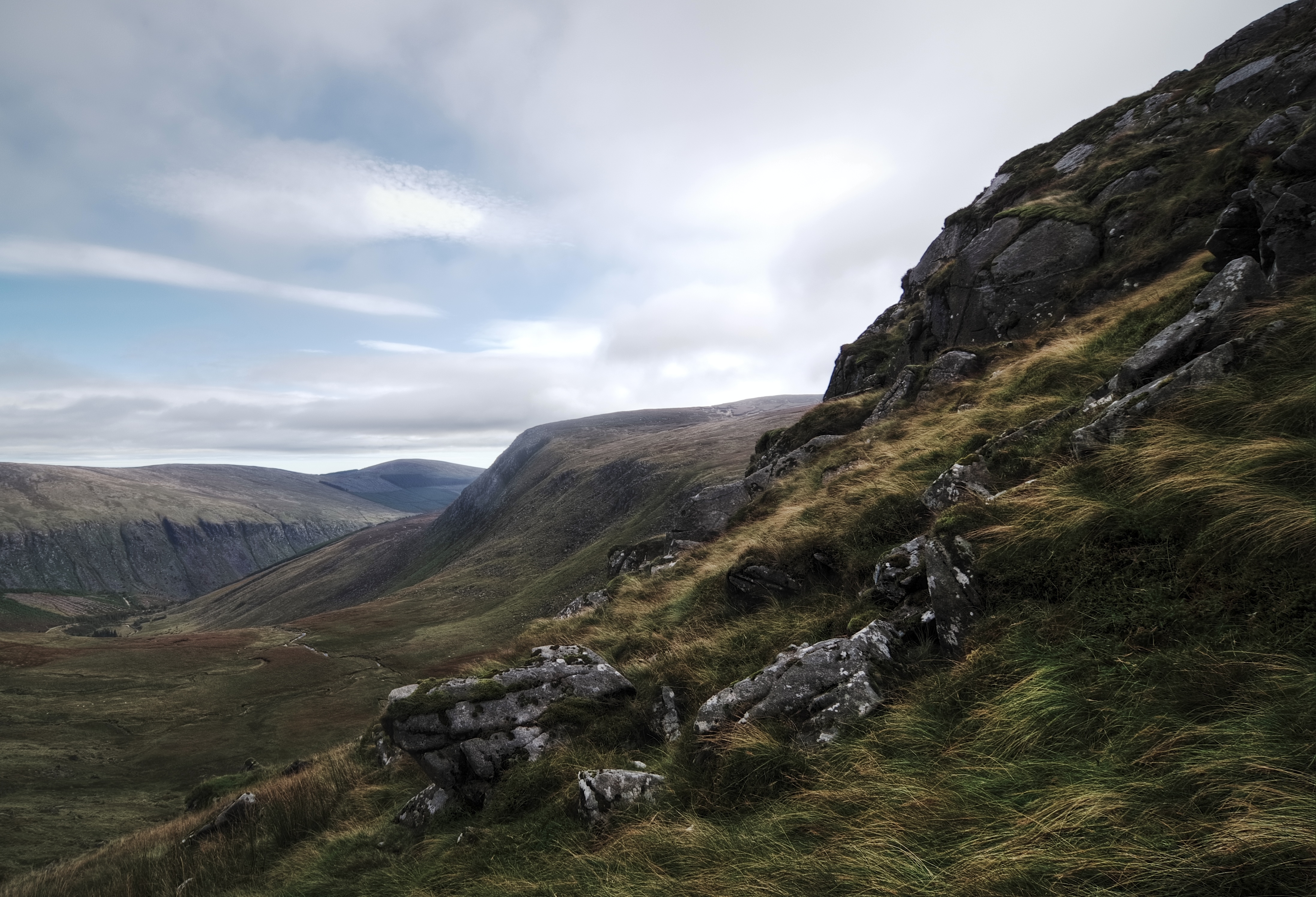
Typical landscape above Glenmalure, autumn 2013

=== Art O'Neill Walk ===
According to McNally, commemoration of the event "long predates the extreme-sports craze of which it is now part". An annual trek along the escape route has been happening since at least 1954 when The Irish Times reported that four men and a woman had completed it that year. History Ireland, as well as the official webpage of the event, also state that people have been walking the same escape route taken by the men "for years" in unofficial commemoration of the event.

Irish mountaineer Paddy O'Leary recounts the Art O'Neill Walk being undertaken in the month of May in 1952, during which the group descended from a ridge to attend mass in the village of Lacken. Later that same year, to be more faithful to the original conditions, the walk was undertaken again in December:

Later that year Uinseann MacEoin, an architect, and Dáithí Ó Scoláird, a civil servant who had been on the previous walk, decided with others to make the outing more in keeping with the original by starting at night from Dublin Castle in late December, a custom followed ever since, sometimes in extreme conditions which tax even hardened climbers. They took about 19 hours, having again diverted to attend Mass, this time in Valleymount. It seems they initiated the tradition of ending up at Ballinacor, the site of Fiach McHugh O'Byrne's stronghold, the final refuge of Hugh O'Donnell, the survivor of that terrible blizzard-beset escape.

The prologue to Leary's 2015 book The Way That We Climbed: A History of Irish Hillwalking, Climbing and Mountaineering recounts a group undertaking the Art O'Neill Walk in an unspecified year in the 1950s, in which O'Leary himself participated. The group followed an eastern route via Lough Dan and Glendalough, as proposed by one of its members, Tom Quinn. Quinn, having researched the history of the 1592 escape, had concluded that the route taken by the escapees in 1592 was more likely to have followed the eastern rather than the western side of the Wicklow Mountains. O'Leary notes that throughout the rest of the 1950s, Dublin working-class youth hostellers gradually began joining Tom Quinn "on his more venturesome enterprises", adding "a new flavour to an already irreverent approach to what conventional society would then have regarded as a fairly irresponsible activity".

From at least 1998 to 2007, an unofficial Art O'Neill Walk took place every year in January, starting at midnight from Dublin Castle, and was attended by people from "various hillwalking clubs around Ireland" as well as casual attendees who chose to turn up on the night. The walk was conducted on a "no fee/no pre-entry" basis, and was primarily organised by, and for, members of the Irish Ramblers Club, led each year by Tom Milligan, an experienced hillwalker. Milligan recalled in a 2007 website post:

In 1998, before the walk was promoted on the internet, only four people turned up. Since then things have changed somewhat. Indeed, on this Friday night, 5th January, 2007, four hundred and fifteen years after the escape of Red Hugh O’Donnell and Art and Henry O'Neill in 1592, over sixty walkers turned up for the challenge.

The 2007 walk followed a 46 km long route, along which a small number of resting points were observed. A "small group of regular volunteers from the Wayfarers Hillwalking Club" were noted as having provided a "welcome cup of soup and a slice of cake" to participants upon reaching the first one of these at Kilbride Army Camp at 3.30am, an isolated location at the foot of Seefin Mountain in County Wicklow. Other Wayfarers that year volunteered to transport "carloads of backpacks to this point" which allowed walkers to change from walking shoes into hiking boots and put on head torches in preparation for the off-road mountain section of the walk which was to follow. Upon encountering mist on Black Hill, attendees grouped together in the dark for safety before continuing, and at 9.30am reached Ballinagee Bridge, another resting point, which forms part of the R756 road (the Wicklow Gap road).

As daylight broke, the group ascended Glenreemore Brook to Art's Cross, before descending into Glenmalure valley and the river ford at Baravore, the traditional ending point of the walk. Some entrants continued on to the village of Greenan to finish at "the remnants of Fiach MacHugh O'Byrnes fortress". Pat Lynch, a member of Wayfarers Hillwalking Club, provided transport from the finish point "to anyone who required a lift to the train in Rathdrum" where they could get a ticket back to Dublin. In summary of the 2007 event, Milligan wrote:

This walk has a lot of road and track in it and half of it happens in darkness. Hillwalkers normally don't like that arrangement of terrains, but the strangeness and unusual nature of the Walk, allied with the dramatic story it commemorates, makes it a journey everyone remembers with satisfaction, especially those who joined us from far-flung places like Sweden, Germany and the Sultanate of Oman.

As the walk grew in popularity amongst Leinster's hillwalking community, numbers taking part in the event continued to increase year on year and were welcomed, until eventually Milligan was required to notify the public in an un-dated post of the following caveat:

This walk has been organised for members of the Irish Ramblers Club, but over recent years many non-members have tagged along and have always been welcome. However, due to the fact that non-members are not covered by club insurance we have decided that it would be unwise to invite all and sundry to participate with us again this year. If a serious accident were to occur to a non-member and they were not covered by insurance then questions would be asked about the practice I've adopted in previous years of casually inviting all comers. Nevertheless, if people do turn up and decide to follow us then we will be happy to have their company but they will do so at their own risk.

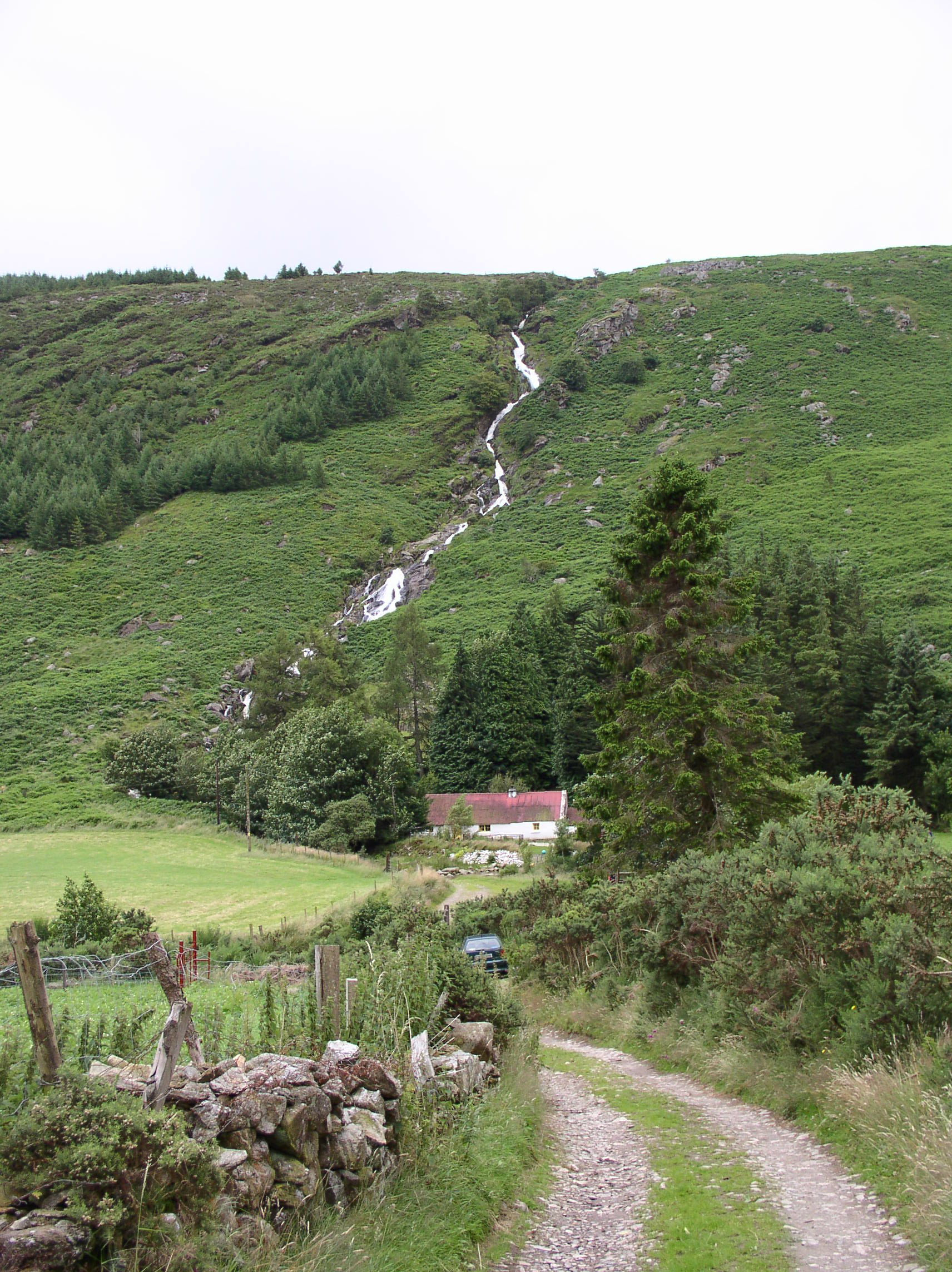
Glenmalure valley, County Wicklow

In his closing comments on the post, Milligan reminded prospective participants that it "is NOT a led walk so you need to be able to navigate if the group moves ahead of you", and "There will be NO backup so you will need to bring your own food and have transport at the finish to bring you home". Milligan specified that "a map and compass, headtorch, reflective band (for the road walk), whistle, food and rain-gear should be carried by all." He also warned that "The time taken to cover the route is usually 14+ hrs depending on the weather conditions and the fitness of the participants."

=== Art O'Neill Challenge ===
==== 2009 ====
The official website of the Art O'Neill Challenge states that the event became an organised event in 2009, initially as a fundraiser for rugby player Stuart Mangan, an Irishman living in London who had been paralysed from the neck down following a rugby accident in April 2008. The 2009 event was organised by Gearóid Towey, an Irish Olympic athlete, who conceived the event as a means to raise money for Mangan, and at the event the racing bibs of competitors displayed the words "The Stuart Mangan Appeal".

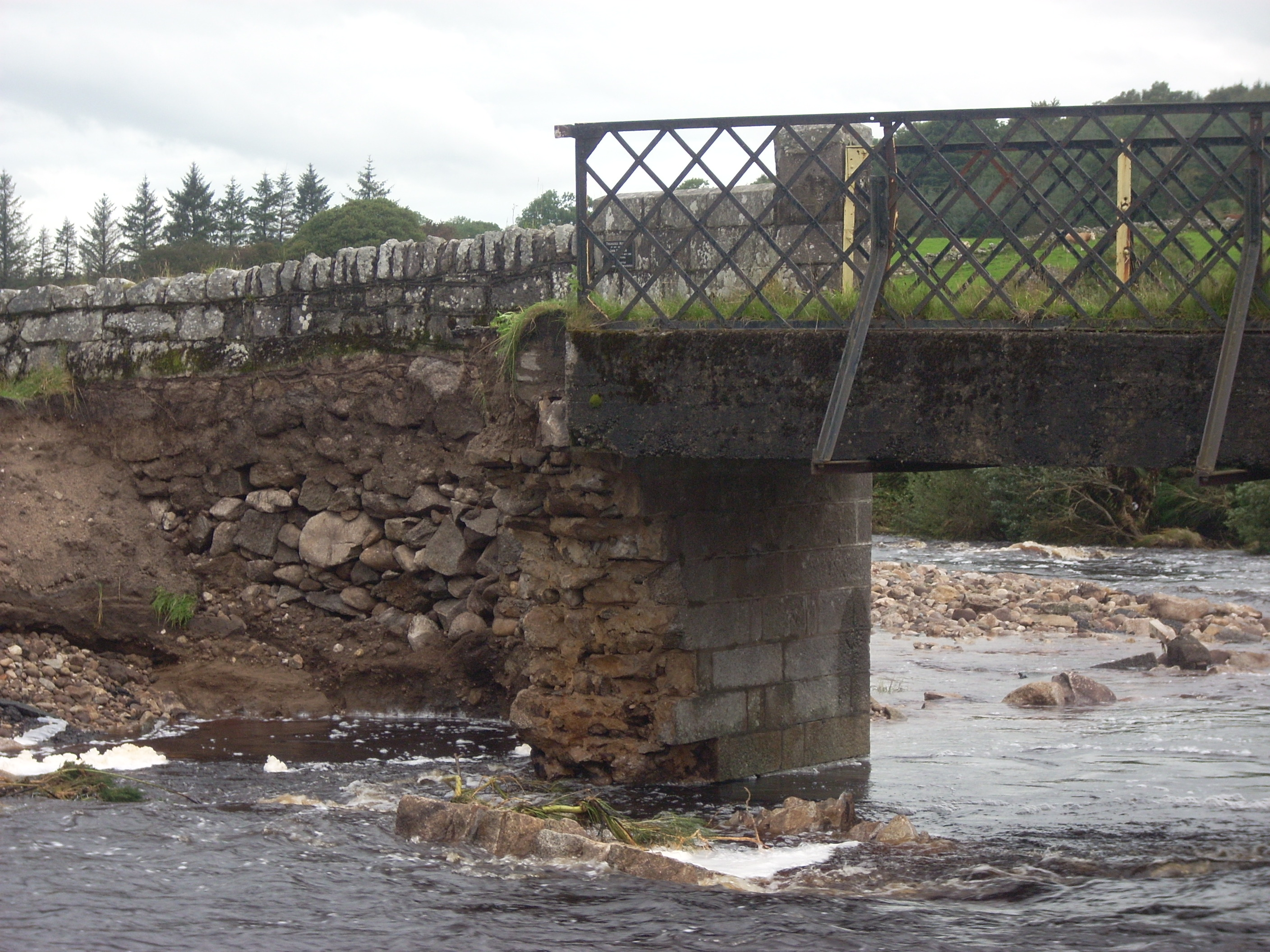
Ballysmuttan Bridge, pictured in September 2008

In August 2008, Ballysmuttan Bridge, which crosses the River Liffey near Seefin (and was ordinarily crossed as part of the Art O'Neill route), was severely damaged during the 2008 Ireland floods and subsequently closed off to public use. As a result, from 2009 until the bridge's re-opening in 2012, the annual Art O'Neill trail was rerouted to a footbridge at Ballynabrocky, close to Kippure Lodge, the nearest bridge at which to cross the Liffey.

In the 2009 event, 200 hikers took part as well as just 11 ultra runners, who departed Dublin Castle at midnight and 2am respectively. Those who chose to hike were provided with experienced guides to navigate for them on the mountain section, whereas the ultra runners were not. Eventual winner of the ultra category, Eoin Keith, gave navigational advice to some of the other 10 ultra competitors prior to the race.

Adrian Tucker, who came second place in the ultra category (losing to Eoin Keith), wrote a report of the event afterwards for the official Stuart Mangan Appeal website, noting that "Whether you're a walker, hiker, runner or whatever, there's room for you out there on this event, which is very well organised, and has a great friendly group of volunteers assisting."

Stuart Mangan subsequently died in August 2009. The Art O'Neill Challenge did not take place in 2010.

==== 2011 ====
In October 2010, Gearóid Towey announced on the forum pages of the Irish Mountain Running Association (IMRA) that the event would be going ahead again in January 2011, and that "the Sports Charitable Trust and Mountain Rescue (would) benefit from funds raised" on that occasion. Towey announced that there would now be "three ways to participate: run, hike or a combination of both" and reminded that navigational skills would be required for runners.

An information evening was held at the Dublin premises of Basecamp (an outdoor retailer and one of the event sponsors) a few nights prior to the 2011 event, at which "over 130 people turned out [..] given by event organiser Gearoid Towey, (Eoin) Keith and Declan Cunningham from (the) Dublin Wicklow Mountain Rescue Team which covered topics such as logistics, nutrition, safety, route and navigation using a Garmin GPS device."

The 2011 event witnessed a 150% increase on 2009 numbers, with 500 registrants, including "a large international contingent" according to Outsider Magazine, with Irish, English, Scottish, Brazilian, American, German, Australian, New Zealand French, Italian, Spanish, Portuguese, Danish, Dutch and South African contestants signing up. Of the initial 500 registrants, only 482 participants actually started the race, of which 324 finished. The youngest finisher was 15-year-old named Ruari Cashman.

Broadcaster Myles Dungan took part in the hiking option of the event in 2011, recounting his experiences later for The History Show on RTÉ Radio 1. Having set off from Dublin Castle at midnight on Friday 7 January, Dungan and colleagues reached the finish line "around five o'clock" the following evening (Saturday 8 January) as the sun was setting, having walked for approximately 17 hours.

==== Subsequent years ====
"First 100 Entries 82 Euro (inclusive of Active Network commission)

Thereafter 92 Euro (inclusive of Active Network commission)

The entry fee includes:

- Transport from the finish in Barravore to Glenmalure Lodge by mini bus.
- Transport by coach from Glenmalure Valley to Dublin.
- Hot drinks (coffee, tea, soup) and food (sandwich, flapjack) at checkpoint 1 (25k mark)
- Hot drinks (tea, coffee) and food (porridge, flapjacks) at checkpoint 2 (38k mark)
- Transport of a bag with change of clothes and footwear to checkpoint 1 and on to the finish for your arrival.
- Official AON Technical T Shirt
- First Aid
- Guiding where needed
- Marshalling en route
- Chip timing and recording
- Fifteen Euro donation to Mountain Rescue

Please note that we operate a no refunds and no transfers policy. In the event of extreme weather which would compromise safety, the event will be rescheduled."

— Official Art O'Neill Challenge website detailing the then-upcoming 2012 event

From 2012 onwards, a cap of 200 participants per year was placed on the event owing to National Parks and Wildlife Service restrictions. In 2014, the allocation of tickets via a lottery system was introduced for the first time after an attempted online booking system crashed.

The 2016 event was featured on Irish television programme Nationwide in February of that year.

In November 2017, whilst advertising registration for the upcoming 2018 event, Irish sports publication Outsider Magazine wrote that the event was becoming "the stuff of legends".

Since 2009, the event has grown, "owing to the hard work of Declan Cunningham and Gearóid Towey", into a "recognised annual sporting fixture on the Irish circuit". In 2018, organisation of the event passed to the Dublin & Wicklow Mountain Rescue team. As of 2025, the event serves as a major fundraising source for the service.

The 2021 event was cancelled due to COVID-19. Initially it was provisionally delayed until March/April 2021, but was then cancelled outright due to the pandemic.

A briefing / information night is often held by organisers at the Dublin city premises of outdoor equipment shop 'Great Outdoors' in the days leading up to the event, where participants can air questions.

The 2025 event, due to take place on 10 January, was postponed on 8 January due to unsafe conditions along the route caused by extreme cold weather and snow affecting Ireland and the UK. Event organisers noted they were "currently assessing alternative dates... likely to be in April or May 2025, due to the complexities of booking Dublin Castle and aligning with other key event partners." The 2025 event is scheduled to take place on 26 September.

== Participation options ==
=== AON Challenge ===
The challenge can be undertaken on a walking, running, or hybrid basis, which was a precedent established in the 2011 event. The official website that year (2011) explained that the run option would be treated as a race, whereas the hybrid option would involve running to Kippure Lodge and walking the rest of the way, and the walk would be treated as a group effort with no competitive element. The places for the Challenge event are decided by lottery, and capped at 200.

The hybrids run the road section (30 km approx.), and then begin the mountain section in a guided group. The ultra-runners navigate themselves across the open mountain stages. All entrants are fully supported by Dublin & Wicklow Mountain Rescue Team, should help be needed.

As of 2015, it was usual that the walkers depart from Dublin Castle at midnight, the hybrids depart at 1am, and the runners depart at 2am, however these times have since changed.

As of the 2025 event, the deadline for participants to enter their name into the lottery for the Challenge event (all three categories) was 6 October 2024. Only one entry per person is permitted. The day after the deadline, the events' official Facebook page announced that nearly 700 people had entered the lottery for the 200 places on offer for the Challenge that year.

=== AON Pursuit ===
The AON Pursuit, sometimes subtitled a "25km Fugitive Chase", is a shorter option that first appeared as part of the 2023 event. It is a running-only event, which covers the first 25 km of the route to Kippure Estate, and re-enacts the wardens of Dublin Castle who "gave chase" in the 1592 escape, but "gave up due to poor weather".

Both events (Challenge and Pursuit) start from Dublin Castle and follow the same route through Dublin to Kippure Estate in County Wicklow, where only the Pursuit finishes. Kippure Estate lies below the mountain of Kippure, in a townland bearing the same name.

The allocation of tickets for the Pursuit option is not lottery-based, but rather on a first-come-first-served basis. Individual tickets for the AON Pursuit cost €75 per person (as of 2025). It has been described by "Runna", a running coach app, as an "ideal way to experience the rich history of the legendary escape without committing to the full 60km challenge".

=== Entrance fee ===
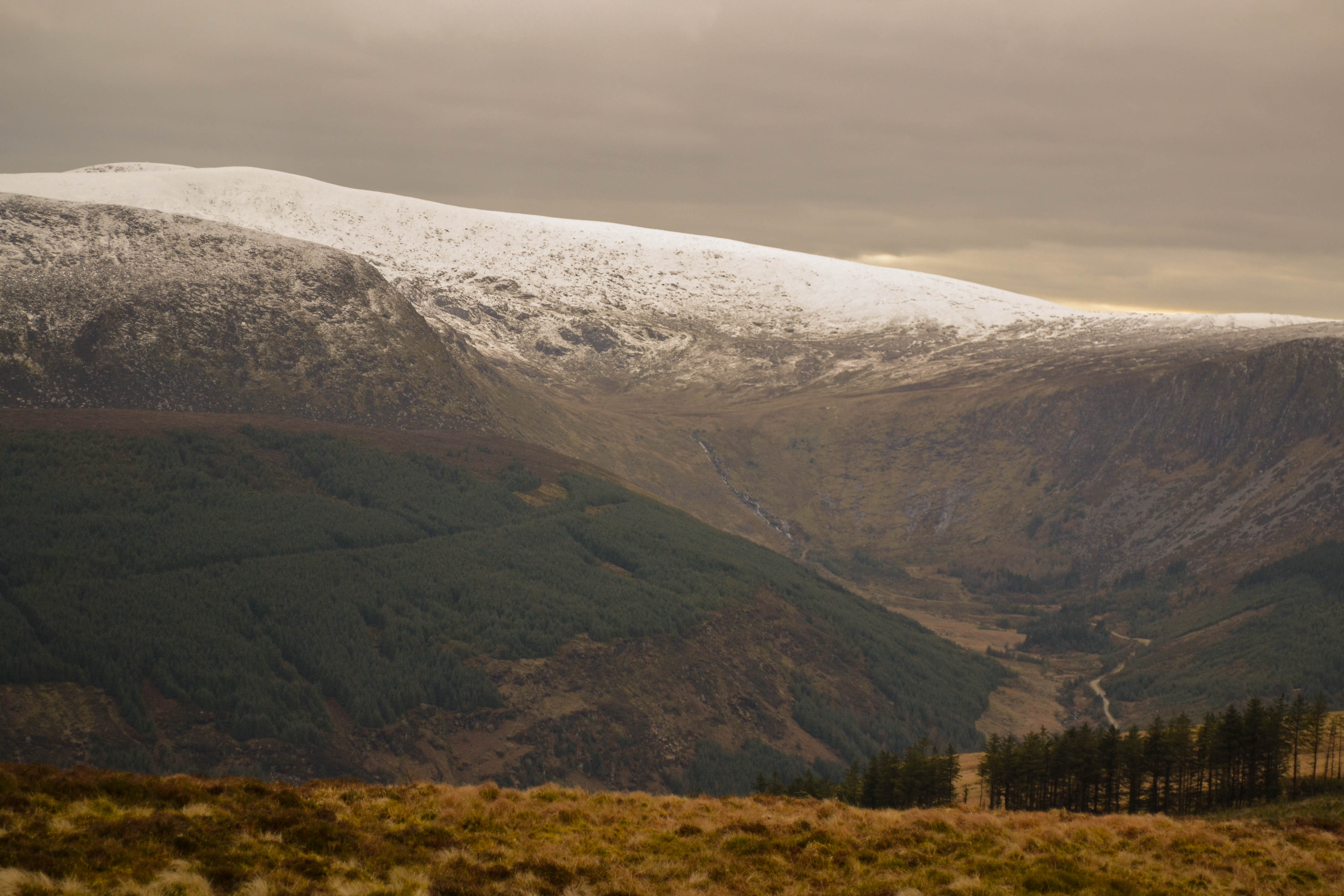
Snow on the Wicklow Mountains (Lugnaquilla) in February 2018

In 2009, the entrance fee of €50 included "transport from the finish in Baravore to public transport in Dublin if needed, hot drinks, food, first aid and guiding where needed en route". From 2018, the entrance fee was noted as €140 per person, with all proceeds "going directly to Dublin Wicklow Mountain Rescue Team's (DWMRT) operating costs". It was explained by Outsider Magazine in November 2017, that DWMRT were hoping to use funds to build their own rescue base. As of the 2025 event, it costs €175 per ticket for the Challenge event, and €75 per person for the AON Pursuit.

=== Ticketing / Lottery ===
As of the 2016 event, the Belpark Triathlon Club, based in Rathfarnham, Dublin, wrote that the AON Challenge was "significantly over subscribed", with approximately 1 in 3 entrants securing a ticket.

Frank McNally, writing in 2017 noted that participation is capped at 200, "but it could be much larger... Up to 800 apply each year".

The Challenge event is capped at 200 entrants, who are selected through a lottery process in the months before the event. The 2025 event, which is due to take place on Friday 10 January 2025, began accepting applicants for its lottery process on 27 September 2024. Entries are non-transferrable.

== Organisation ==
=== Gear list ===
The organisers release a mandatory gear list required to compete in the event each year. This typically includes such items as a "map, compass, food, bivvy bag, waterproof jacket and bottoms, torches, first aid kit, whistle, wool hat, spare clothing (top and bottoms), foil blanket".

As of late 2015, there was no phone coverage on the upper reaches of some of the mountain stages of the event.

=== Gear dropoff ===
Participants are able to bring a bag with them to a drop off point in the courtyard of Dublin Castle before the race, which is then transported to the checkpoints along the route for them to access.

=== Staffing ===
The event is staffed by members of Dublin & Wicklow Mountain Rescue Team, with the help of volunteers. Safety and rescue cover along the route is provided by mountain rescue team members. According to the official webpage of the event, "The Art O'Neill Challenge provides much-needed funds to keep Dublin & Wicklow Mountain Rescue Team operational, allowing the team's volunteers to maintain its 24/7 emergency response to those in need".

Participants are required to register, and have their kit checked prior to starting the event to ensure they have the mandatory survival items should they be required. Participants are also electronically tagged at this stage. Before each race, participants are also briefed at the front of the castle with personal safety information, as well as rules aimed at minimising their damage to the Wicklow Mountains National Park through which they journey.

For the 2018 event, "several" members of England's Calder Valley SRT (Search and Rescue Team) travelled to Dublin to help with the running of the event.

=== Route ===
The Challenge follows one route, but includes three options to participants: trek, hybrid, and ultra. The route is on paved road for the first 30 km, after which contestants find checkpoint one (located in Ballynultagh Wood as of 2025). The Pursuit option finishes at checkpoint one.

From there, the route heads over Billy Byrne's Gap (a saddle between Mullaghcleevaun and Moanbane) and down to checkpoint two, which is near Ballinagee Bridge. From checkpoint two, the route crosses Kings River before ascending to pass by Art's Cross and then crossing a plateau of bogland before reaching Table Track and heading down to the finish line at Glenmalure Lodge, a local pub.

The Challenge consists of 60 km that includes a mixture of city streets, country lanes, fire roads, mountain tracks, and open hillsides. As well as the difficult terrain, the event is self-navigated for the runners, adding an extra element of difficulty.

It is considered extremely useful by organisers to carry out daylight reconnaissance "recce" hikes/runs of the route prior to taking part in the event. There is no official length as part of the event involves self-navigation, and the route and endpoint has varied over the years. The approximate length of the 2024 event was 60 kilometres. Owing to access to privately owned land changing, the 2025 event changed route between Kippure Estate and Ballydonnell Forest, adding an additional 2 kilometres to the event. Prior years have been shorter, sources have claimed it to be 52 km, 53 km, or 55 km.

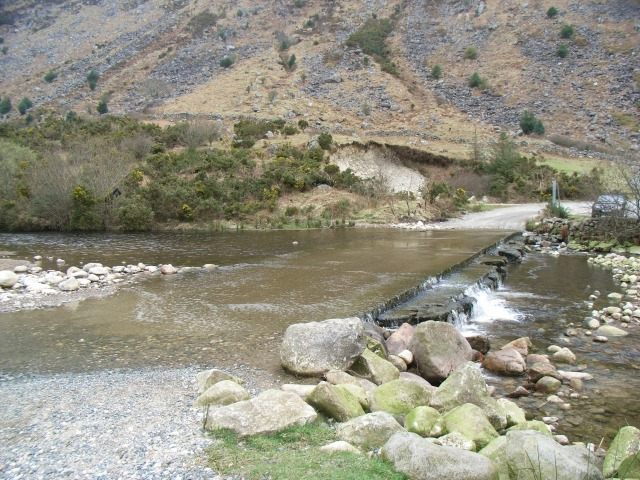
The ford across the River Avonbeg at Baravore in Glenmalure at which the race previously finished, prior to the 2022 event

For many years, the traditional finish line of the Challenge was located at the ford across the River Avonbeg at Baravore where a carpark is located. From the January 2022 event onwards, however, the finish line was pushed back to the carpark at the Glenmalure Lodge pub, adding approximately 6 km to the pre-COVID route.

Many participants eat a full Irish breakfast or drink a pint of Guinness at the Glenmalure Lodge upon finishing. One contestant likened the atmosphere in the pub at the end of the 2016 event to "Coppers on a Friday night".

==== Checkpoints ====
There are two checkpoints along the journey, at which contestants must dip/dib in with their electronic tags, marking their time. These locations, consisting of checkpoint one (Ballynultagh Wood) and checkpoint two (Ballinagee Bridge), offer a place where contestants can rest, change clothes, and refuel by an open fire. Checkpoint one is where participants can access their drop-bag, allowing them to change their clothes if needed, or change from running shoes to hiking boots which will make the coming mountain section more comfortable. Checkpoint one (Ballynultagh Wood) is sometimes known as 'Red Hugh's Kitchen', and checkpoint two (Ballinagee Bridge) is sometimes known as 'Art's Breakfast'.

After checkpoint two, there is no official route which the ultra participants must take, encouraging them to self-navigate over open mountains with "almost no trails to use". From the January 2022 event onwards, it was decided that "Participants must pass within 300 metres of Art's Cross. This will be a mandatory, virtual checkpoint, enforced by GPS tracking". At Glenmalure Lodge, a pub at the finish line, participants are reunited with their drop-bags and can change out of the clothes they competed in.

The atmosphere at checkpoint one, then located at Kippure House, was described by one competitor in 2009:

I arrived at Kippure House at 4.35am. I was guided by one of the event volunteers, who had ferried the runner’s drop-bag to the checkpoint, allowing for quick and easy access to my gear. The checkpoint was a-buzz. There was food, and hot drinks available. People checking-in, people checking-out, people looking for guidance, guides looking for people. The walkers were sorted into small groups and each group was then allocated one or two experienced guides to navigate them the rest of the way to the finish. Runners were also advised to join in with a walking group if they felt their navigation was not good enough to bring them to the finish.

== Starting times ==
Starting times from Dublin Castle
Year:	Date:	AON Challenge: Trek (Walking) Starting Time:	AON Challenge: Hybrid Starting Time:	AON Challenge: Ultra (Running) Starting Time:	AON Challenge: Entrance fee:	AON Pursuit (Running) Starting Time:	AON Pursuit: Entrance fee:	Source(s):
2009	9–10 January	00:00	—N/a	02:00 (11 participants)	€50	—N/a	—N/a	
2010	—N/a	—N/a	—N/a	—N/a	—N/a	—N/a	—N/a	
2011	7–8 January	00:00	?	02:00	€?	—N/a	—N/a	
2012	13–14 January	00:00	01:15	02:00	€92	—N/a	—N/a	
2013	11–12 January	?	?	?	€99	—N/a	—N/a	
2014	10–11 January	00:00	01:00	02:00	€100	—N/a	—N/a	
2015	16–17 January	00:00	01:00	02:00	€110	—N/a	—N/a	
2016	15–16 January	00:00	?	01:00	€110	—N/a	—N/a	
2017	13–14 January	00:00	01:00	01:00	€110	—N/a	—N/a	
2018	12–13 January	00:00?	01:00	00:00?	€140	—N/a	—N/a	
2019	11–12 January	?	?	00:00	€?	—N/a	—N/a	
2020	17–18 January	?	?	00:00	€?	—N/a	—N/a	
2021 (Cancelled due to COVID-19)	—N/a	—N/a	—N/a	—N/a	—N/a	—N/a	—N/a	
2022 (Staggered starting times due to COVID-19)	21–22 January	20:00	?	22:10-22:30	€?	—N/a	—N/a	
2023	13–14 January	21:00	21:30	23:00	€?	22:00	€?	
2024	12–13 January	20:30	21:00	23:00	€?	00:00	€?	
2025	26–27 September (originally 10–11 January, but postponed due to extreme weather)	19:30-20:30	20:30-21:30	21:30-22:15 (non-competitive) 23:00 (competitive)	€175	00:00	€75	
2026	16–17 January	19:00-20:00	No hybrid category in 2026	21:00-22:30 (non-competitive) 23:00 (competitive)	€175 (plus €6 non-refundable fee to enter the lottery and booking charges of €12.25 to enter the event if selected)	?	€75 (early bird rate €65)	

== Similar events in Ireland ==
- The Lug Walk, a long-distance endurance walk from Seahan forest entrance (on the border between County Wicklow and County Dublin), via Lugnaquilla, towards Seskin in the Glen of Imaal, Wicklow where it ends. The route is 51 km long, takes an average of 15 hours to complete, and follows a route that crosses mainly open mountain terrain. The walk started in 1974, and takes place every two years (biennially)
- The Moonlight Challenge, a night-time walk (consisting of approximately 27 km), that starts and finishes at the Glen of Imaal Mountain Rescue Base at Trooperstown, close to the village of Laragh in County Wicklow. The event has existed since at least 2010. As of 2024, the Moonlight Challenge served as the primary funding stream for the Glen of Imaal Mountain Rescue Team
- Walk the Line, a similar annual self-navigated or guided walking event that starts from Glencullen in Dublin and takes place partly during the hours of darkness. The event has taken place since at least 2012 and also raises funds for the Dublin & Wicklow Mountain Rescue Team

== See also ==
- The Barkley Marathons, a similar ultramarathon trail race held annually in Tennessee, USA which was inspired by the escape of James Earl Ray from nearby Brushy Mountain State Penitentiary in 1977
- The Horse Boy, a short story concerning the lead up to the 1592 Dublin Castle escape, published in the Irish Monthly in 1933
- The Nine Years' War, led mainly by Red Hugh O'Donnell, which lasted in Ireland from 1593 to 1603
- The Pale, the part of Ireland that was directly under the control of the English government in the Late Middle Ages (AD 1300 to 1500), and was centred around Dublin
- Saint Kevin's Way, a walking route which intersects part of the route of the Art O'Neill Challenge
