= Brendan Kehoe =

Irish software developer

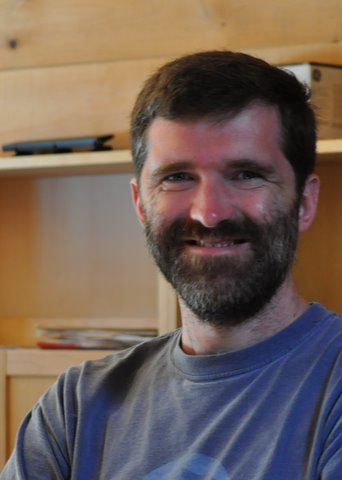
- Kehoe in 2010
- Born: December 3, 1970; Dublin, Ireland
- Died: July 19, 2011 (aged 40); Dublin, Ireland
- Occupations: Software developer and author
- Notable work: Zen and the Art of the Internet: A Beginner's Guide
- Children: 2

Brendan Patrick Kehoe (3 December 1970 – 19 July 2011) was an Irish software developer and writer. Born in Dublin, Ireland, Kehoe was raised in China, Maine. In his early teens, he was first exposed to computing when he was given a Commodore 64 computer, which he used to teach himself about computing and computer networks. On leaving high-school, he moved to Widener University where he continued his computer studies, leaving in 1992.

== Career ==
Kehoe wrote two books and a number of technology articles in the specialist press (e.g., Boardwatch Magazine) on the topic of the Internet. His first book, Zen and the Art of the Internet: A Beginner's Guide, first published by Prentice Hall in July 1992, was the first mass-published user's guide to the Internet. Zen was written while Kehoe was still at Widener; he struck a bargain with the publishers to ensure that the original edition of the book would remain free-of-charge in the internet for everyone to access. In a survey taken by PC Magazine for the twentieth anniversary of the PC, Zen and the Art of the Internet was listed as one of the "top sci-fi/tech non-fiction books of the past twenty years" (1981–2001). It also appeared on Sergey Brin's "Favorite Booklist". As one of the first substantial books freely available for reuse on the Internet, Zen predated and helped to inspire the free culture movement. Parts of it were reworked into other works including the Electronic Frontier Foundation's Guide to the Internet.

Kehoe was a dedicated and detailed programmer, who, as a student, volunteered changes to one of the most complex pieces of free software in the world at the time, the GNU C++ Compiler and Library. His unusual skill at wrangling this code led to a full-time job as a key employee of Cygnus Support in Silicon Valley in 1992, improving, supporting and documenting this code base. By 1995 he was managing the entire GNU C++ group at Cygnus.

Later in life, Kehoe volunteered doing IT support for his local school, the Dalkey School Project. This led to positions as a member of its Board of Management, and from there to being Chairperson of the school. In 2010, he was appointed to the Board of Directors of Educate Together. Kehoe was described by Eric S. Raymond after his death as "a true hacker and a gentleman". He is attributed as having coined the term "net-surfing" in a 1991 USENET post.

== Personal life ==
On 31 December 1993, Kehoe and a friend, Sven Heinicke, were involved in a serious car accident that left Kehoe with brain injuries including aphasia. He subsequently made a nearly full recovery, although some brain issues remained. He married on 5 October 1996 and lived in Dublin with his wife and two children.

At the beginning of March 2011, Kehoe was diagnosed with acute myeloid leukaemia. He underwent chemotherapy to fight the disease but succumbed to it on 19 July 2011.

== Bibliography ==
- Zen and the Art of the Internet: A Beginner's Guide, Brendan Kehoe, 1992, ISBN 0-13-452914-6.
- Children and the Internet: A Zen Guide for Parents and Educators, Brendan Kehoe and Victoria Mixon, 1996, ISBN 0-13-244674-X.
