= Secularist of the Year =

- Irwin Prize
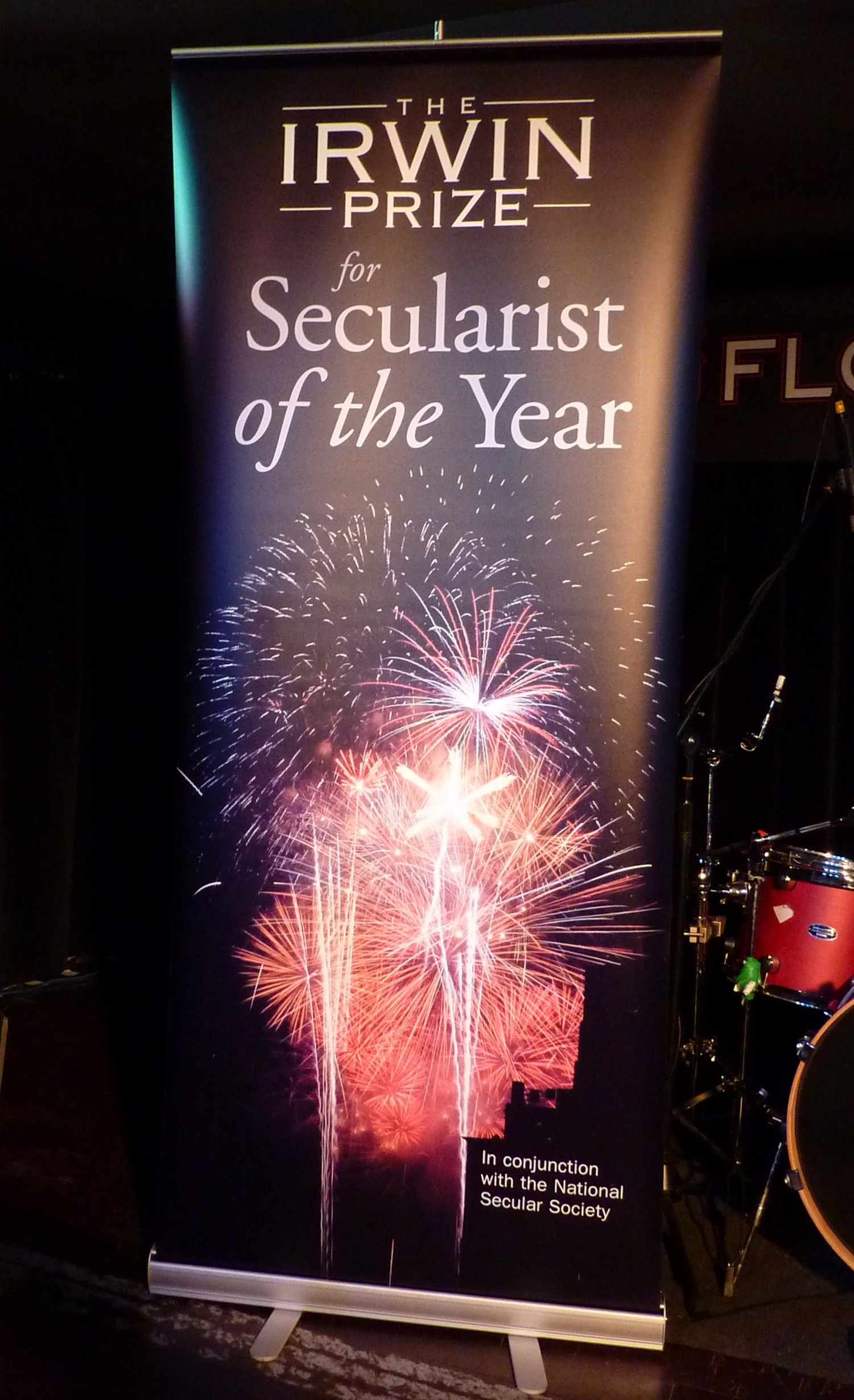
- The Secularist of the Year poster used at the award ceremony
- Awarded for: Making an outstanding contribution to the secularist movement
- Location: London
- Country: United Kingdom
- Presented by: National Secular Society
- Reward: £5000
- First award: 2005
- Website: www.secularism.org.uk/soty

Secularist of the Year, also known as the Irwin Prize, is an award presented annually in the United Kingdom by the National Secular Society in "recognition of an individual or an organisation considered to have made an outstanding contribution to the secularist movement."

The award was established in 2005, and until 2017 it was sponsored by and named after humanist and secularist campaigner Dr. Michael Irwin. The prize consisted of a trophy, the "Golden Ammonite", and a cheque for £5000. The last time Secularist of the Year was awarded was in 2019.

== List of recipients ==
List of recipients of the Secularist of the Year
Year	Portrait	Name	Citation	Presenter	Ref.
2005	Photographic portrait of Maryam Namazie	Maryam Namazie	For "her work in defence of women's rights and the right to freedom of expression"	Polly Toynbee	
2006	Photographic portrait of Steve Jones	Steve Jones	For "his contribution to the promotion of secularism"	Dick Taverne	
2007	Photographic portrait of Mina Ahadi	Mina Ahadi	For "her life opposing the mistreatment of women by the Iranian clerical regime"	Joan Smith	
2008	Not awarded				
2009	Photographic portrait of Eric Lubbock	Eric Lubbock	For "their work in the abolition of blasphemy law"	Richard Dawkins	
2009	Photographic portrait of Evan Harris	Evan Harris	For "their work in the abolition of blasphemy law"	Richard Dawkins	
2010	—	Southall Black Sisters (Note: The award was accepted by Pragna Patel on behalf of the Southall Black Sisters.)	For "their support of black and Asian women's human rights"	Michael Irwin	
2011	Photographic portrait of Sophie in 't Veld	Sophie in 't Veld	For "her work as chair of the European Parliamentary Platform for Secularism in Politic"	A. C. Grayling	
2012	Photographic portrait of Peter Tatchell	Peter Tatchell	For "his lifelong commitment to the defence of human rights against religious fundamentalism"	Nick Cohen	
2013	—	Plan UK (Note: The award was accepted by Debbie Langdon-Davies on behalf of Plan UK.)	"In honour of young human rights activist Malala Yousafzai, the prize was donated to Plan UK" for its campaign to ensure equal access to education for girls worldwide.	Michael Cashman	
2014	Photographic portrait of Şafak Pavey	Şafak Pavey	For "her international work promoting secularism, Human Rights and gender equality as well as humanitarian aid and peace-building"	Kerry McCarthy	
2015	Charlie Hebdo logo	Charlie Hebdo (Note: The award was accepted by Martin Rowson on behalf of Charlie Hebdo.)	For "its courageous response to the terror attack on its Paris office and defence of secularism"	Martin Rowson	
2016	—	Educate Together (Note: The award was accepted by Paul Rowe on behalf of Educate Together.)	For "its work in challenging religious discrimination/privilege in Ireland's education system and setting out a positive vision for inclusive secular education"	Julia Hartley-Brewer	
2017	Photographic portrait of Yasmin Rehman	Yasmin Rehman	For "her advocacy of a secularist approach to tackling hate crime, promoting social cohesion and the human rights of women, and challenging sectarianism and theocracy"	Yasmin Alibhai-Brown	
2018	—	Phil Johnson	For "their courageous campaigning work over many years to expose the institutional abuse of children and vulnerable adults in the Church of England"	Peter Tatchell	
2018	—	Graham Sawyer	For "their courageous campaigning work over many years to expose the institutional abuse of children and vulnerable adults in the Church of England"	Peter Tatchell	
2019	—	Saif ul-Malook	For "his courageous defense of Asia Bibi and other clients in Pakistan accused of blasphemy"	Geoffrey Robertson	

== See also ==
- List of religion-related awards
