= Paul Rowe =

Paul Rowe may refer to:

- Paul Rowe (Canadian football) (1917–1990), Canadian professional football fullback
- Paul Rowe (ice hockey) (1914–1993), American ice hockey player
- Paul Rowe (educationalist), Irish chief executive officer of Educate Together
- Paul Rowe (swimmer), New Zealand-Australian swimmer
- Paul Rowe (Australian footballer) (1941–2023), Australian footballer
- Paul Rowe (rower) (1949–2015), Australian rower and rowing coach

== See also ==
- Rowe (surname)
