= NAWC =

NAWC car refer to:

- Naval Air Warfare Center, a research organization for the US Navy
- Newham Asian Women’s Collective, predecessor of the London Black Women's Project
