= Áine Hyland =

Áine Hyland (née Donlon) is Emeritus Professor of Education and former vice-president of University College Cork, Ireland. She was born in 1942 in Athboy, County Meath and went to school in the Mercy Convent, Ballymahon, County Longford where she sat her Leaving Cert in 1959. She was a civil servant in the Department of Education from 1959 to 1964, during which time she worked as a research assistant on the Investment in Education report (https://www.researchgate.net/publication/263703747_The_investment_in_education_report_1965_-_recollections_and_reminiscences). She married Bill Hyland in 1964 and worked for a short period in the International Labour Office in Geneva, Switzerland.

She completed a Bachelor's degree in Arts in University College Dublin in 1966. She was awarded the Higher Diploma in Education, the Masters in Education and a Ph.D. in 1966, 1975 and 1982 by the University Of Dublin (Trinity College). She taught in Hillcourt Secondary School, Glenageary (now Rathdown School https://www.rathdownschool.ie) and St. Andrew's College, Booterstown *https://www.sac.ie) in the 1970s.

She was appointed Admissions Officer and Senior Lecturer in Education in Carysfort Teacher Education College, Blackrock, Co. Dublin in 1980 and remained there until its closure in 1988 (https://books.google.ie/books/about/Carysfort_College_Remembered.html?id=-2EKwQEACAAJ&redir_esc=y) when she was appointed Senior Lecturer in Education in University College Dublin (https://www.ucd.ie). In 1993, she was appointed Professor of Education and Head of the Education Department in University College Cork (https://www.ucc.ie) and in 1999 she was appointed (Academic) Vice-President of the university. During the 1990s and the early 2000s, she was a member of faculty of the Project Zero Summer School in the Harvard Graduate School of Education (https://pz.harvard.edu/professional-development).

She was a founder member of the Dalkey School Project (Ireland's first Educate Together national school) in the 1970s and served on the board of management of the school from 1978 to 1984. (ref: Áine Hyland, A Brave New Vision for Education in Ireland: the Dalkey School Project 1974 to 1984 - published 2020). Educate Together is now recognised by the Department of Education as patron of more than 1o0 schools at both primary and post-primary level (https://www.https://www.educatetogether.ie/).

Áine Hyland is a scholar in the areas of history of education, curriculum design, and educational policy and practice at all education levels. During her years as Professor of Education in University College Cork, her research interests focused particularly on educational inclusion. The Bridging the Gap project (https://www.ucc.ie/en/bridgingthegap/overview/backgroundtobridgingthegap/) which she led in Cork worked with schools and families in areas of educational disadvantage, and the Multiple Intelligences Project sought to identify and implement inclusive teaching and learning approaches. As Vice President, she set up a teaching and learning centre (now CIRTL httlp://www.ucc.ie/cirtl) and introduced a certificate, diploma and masters degree in Teaching and Learning in Higher Education, the first such qualification for university lecturers and professors in Ireland. In 2021, the university named a room in the centre after Áine Hyland in recognition of her significant contribution to the advancement of Irish education.

She has been chairperson and/or a member of various government-appointed committees and boards. She was a member of the Curriculum and Examinations Board from 1984 to 1988; the Special Education Review Committee from 1991 to 1993; the Constitution Review Group from 1995 to 1996 (https://catalogue.nli.ie/Record/vtls000226049); the Dormant Accounts Board from 2002 to 2006 (https://www.irishstatutebook.ie/eli/2001/act/32); the Irish Research Council for the Humanities and Social Sciences from 2004 to 2008 - now the Irish Research Council (https://www.https://research.ie/) and the board of TUSLA in 2018. She chaired the Commission on the Points system from 1997 to 1999; the (statutory) Educational Disadvantage Committee from 2002 to 2005 and the committee which reviewed Special Accommodations for the State Examinations Commission in 2009.

Following her retirement from University College Cork in 2006, she became a member of the European Universities' Association's Institutional Evaluation Project (IEP) (https://www.https://www.iep-qaa.org/)and in that capacity Hyland was involved in the evaluation of universities in Portugal, Italy, Hungary, Slovakia, Turkey, Bosnia-Herzegovina and Romania. She also worked on various projects with Ireland's Higher Education Authority, contributing to the HEA's National Strategy to 2030. (https://hea.ie/policy/he-reform/overview/).She also contributed to HEA-NCCA debates on the transition of students from second to third level (https://hea.ie/policy/policy-development/transitions/) and has been an assessor for various HEA and Irish Research Council grants including the recent Human Capital Initiative (Pillar 3) projects. (https://hea.ie/skills-engagement/human-capital-initiative-pillars-1-2-and-3/hci-pillar-3-projects-hub/). She has carried out reviews of teacher education programmes for the Teaching Council of Ireland and worked with Professor Pasi Sahlberg on Reviews of Teacher Education in Ireland (https://pasisahlberg.com/news/second-review-of-teacher-education-in-ireland/).

She has been a member of a number of school boards of management as well as the governing authority of University College Cork, the National College of Ireland and the Medical and Health Sciences Board of the Royal College of Surgeons of Ireland.

She is interested in educational policy and practice at all levels of education. Her publications include a three volume collection of extracts from Irish educational documents from earliest times to the 1990s, which she co-edited with Kenneth Milne. (Irish Educational Documents Vols. 1, 2 and 3 published by the Church of Ireland College of Education, 1987, 1992 and 1994). She has published more than 50 articles, reports and papers as well as presenting at numerous conferences nationally and internationally.

In recognition of her contribution to Irish education, she has been awarded a Fellowship of the National College of Ireland; and honorary doctorates by the Royal College of Surgeons ofIreland (D.Sc.) and University College Dublin (D.Litt.). In 2018, Hyland was admitted as a member of the Royal Irish Academy. In 2024, she was awarded a Lifetime Achievement Award by the Educational Studies Association of Ireland. (https://esai.ie/lifetime-achievement-award-2024-prof-aine-hyland/).

Family: Aine married Bill Hyland. The two of them had three daughters: Sonja, Fiona, Niamh. These 3 daughters gave Aine 6 grandchildren. Sonja's children include Louis Patrick Scott and Alexander Liam Scott. Fiona's children Liam Laird and Daniel Laird. And finally Niamh's children include Finn Kelly and Naoise Kelly.

== Publications ==
- Multi-Denominational Schools in the Republic of Ireland 1975-1995 Paper delivered by Professor Áine Hyland, Professor of Education, University College, Cork, Ireland, at a Conference Education and Religion organised by C.R.E.L.A. at the University of Nice. 21–22 June 1996
- A Review of the Structure of Initial Teacher Education Provision in Ireland. Background Paper for the International Review Team May 2012. Higher Education Authority.
