= Southall Black Sisters =

Women's rights organisation

- Abbreviation: SBS
- Formation: 1979
- Founded at: Southall
- Tax ID no.: 1204937
- Registration no.: 03037955
- Legal status: Charity
- Purpose: Providing holistic specialist support services in relation to all forms of domestic abuse, sexual abuse and honour-based abuse
- Headquarters: 21 Avenue Road
- Location: Southall, London, United Kingdom UB1 3BL
- Region served: England
- Executive Director: Selma Taha
- Key people: Pragna Patel
- Revenue: £3,679,997 (2024)
- Expenses: £3,657,599 (2024)
- Staff: 23 (2024)
- Award: Secularist of the Year (2010)
- Website: https://southallblacksisters.org.uk/

Southall Black Sisters Director Pragna Patel at the Secular Conference 2014

Southall Black Sisters (SBS) is a non-profit organisation based in Southall, West London, England. This women's group was established in August 1979 in the aftermath of the death of anti-fascist activist Blair Peach, who had taken part in a demonstration against a National Front rally at Southall Town Hall. In 1980, SBS successfully campaigned against virginity testing in the UK, a policy that was being used to verify the authenticity of Asian marriages by checking the state of women's hymens.

== History ==
The SBS was originally established in order to provide a focus for the struggle of Asian women in the fight against racism, but became increasingly involved in defending the human rights of Asian women who are the victims of domestic violence and in campaigning against religious fundamentalism.

Throughout most of its existence, the group's primary campaigners have been Pragna Patel, Meena Patel and Hannana Siddiqui. Gita Sahgal, the writer and journalist (on issues of feminism, fundamentalism, and racism), film director, and human rights activist, has also been an active member of the organization.

They are best known for the role they played in the Ahluwalia case in 1989 when a woman named Kiranjit Ahluwalia set fire to her abusive husband. They supported her in the case, and were eventually successful.

In 2008, SBS won a legal challenge against Ealing Council, which had threatened to withdraw their funding for black and other ethnic minority women in the borough, in order to fund services for all women regardless of ethnic background. The Council sought to justify its decision on the grounds of "equality", "cohesion" and "diversity".

== Awards and recognition ==
In 2010, the organisation was awarded Secularist of the Year by the National Secular Society, in recognition of their support of black and Asian women's human rights.

In July 2015, Pragna Patel was a co-recipient of the inaugural Bob Hepple Equality Award, alongside Mauro Cabral of GATE. The award is named for Bob Hepple, the former lawyer of Nelson Mandela. In 2011, Patel was named in The Guardian as one of the Top 100 Women Activists and Campaigners.

== See also ==
- Association of Black Humanists
- British Asian
- British Black Panthers
- Organisation of Women of African and Asian Descent (OWAAD)
- London Black Women's Project
