= Tyrrelstown =

Townland and outer suburb of Dublin, Ireland

Tyrrelstown Baile an Tirialaigh (Irish)
- Townland
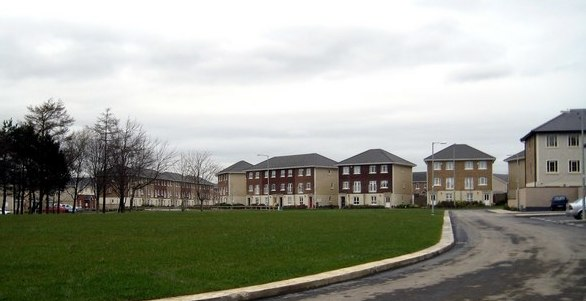
- Housing in Tyrrelstown

- Location in Ireland
- Coordinates: 53.420°N 6.383°W
- Country: Ireland
- Province: Leinster
- County: County Dublin
- Local government area: Fingal

Government
  - Dáil constituency: Dublin West
  - EP constituency: Dublin
- Eircode routing key: D15
- Dialing code: 01, +353 1

Tyrrelstown (Irish: Baile an Tirialaigh) is a townland and planned suburban area within the civil parish of Mulhuddart in Fingal, County Dublin, Ireland. Situated approximately 13 km northwest of Dublin city centre, Tyrrelstown is often considered part of the broader Blanchardstown area. The development of the area began in the early 2000s, and it falls within the Dublin 15 postal district.

== Location ==
Tyrrelstown lies between the N3 and M2 roads. It is bordered by Bellingsmore to the north, Mulhuddart to the south, and Cruiserath to the east. Nearby is the Damastown Industrial Estate which includes an IBM campus. Also in the vicinity is a Bristol Myers Squibb facility in Cruiserath, as well as the Blanchardstown Corporate Park, home to companies such as PayPal and Ask.com.

== History ==
The name Tyrrelstown (also spelled Tyrellstown or Tyrrellstown) originates from the Tyrrell family, including Hugh Tyrrel, who was granted lands in 1178 by Hugh de Lacy, Lord of Meath. Another notable figure, John Tirel (or Tyrrell), served as Chief Justice of the Common Pleas in Ireland during the late 14th century. Tyrrelstown historically formed part of the barony of Castleknock.

To the south of the area stands Tyrrelstown House, a Georgian residence dating to 1720. It is a protected structure under the Fingal County Development Plan. Around 1580, the land was granted to the Bellings family, including Richard Bellings, a key figure in Confederate Ireland.

== Amenities ==
=== Education ===
Tyrrelstown is home to a secondary school affiliated with the Le Chéile Schools Trust and four national schools. These include two Educate Together schools (one being Tyrrelstown Educate Together National School), St Luke's National School (Catholic patronage), and Gaelscoil an Chuilinn (under An Foras Pátrúnachta).

Tyrrelstown ETNS and St Luke's NS were constructed using rapid-build methods by Western Building Systems. In October 2018, they were temporarily closed due to fire safety concerns.

In late 2024, the Department of Education announced plans to relocate Ériu Community College from Ongar, Dublin to Hollywoodrath in Tyrrelstown. The move faced opposition from local parents over the 8-kilometre commute, leading to demonstrations outside Dáil Éireann. Following parliamentary representations, the school's relocation was deferred to 2028.

=== Sport and youth services ===
Tyrrelstown GAA club fields both Gaelic football and hurling teams.

The Foróige youth service operates from the local community centre, providing activities for young people aged 10–18.

Tyrrelstown FC, a local association football club founded in 2004, fields teams in the Athletic Union League and in underage competitions within the North Dublin Schoolboys/Girls League.

Other local clubs include the Tyrrelstown JKS Karate Club and Dublin Sonics Basketball Club.

=== Retail and services ===
A number of commercial services are located in adjacent townlands, including Tyrrelstown Town Centre, Lidl, SuperValu, a butchers in Kilmartin shopping centre, a crèche, and the Carlton Hotel in Cruiserath. A Tesco store was opened in Tyrrelstown in 2026.

== Transport ==
Tyrrelstown is served by several Dublin Bus routes. The 40D connects the area to Dublin city centre, while the 40E links it to the Luas Green Line at Broombridge. The 238 route provides service to Blanchardstown Centre.

A N2–N3 link road was completed in May 2013 and passes by Tyrrelstown, improving the development linkages to the M2 (Dublin-north east motorway). By road it is accessible via Mulhuddart, Hollystown and Cruiserath.
