= Florence Armstrong =

Irish teacher

Florence "Florrie" Armstrong
- Born: 26 November 1928; Drumalure, County Cavan, Ireland
- Died: 14 December 2010 (aged 82); St Vincent's University Hospital, Dublin

Florence "Florrie" Armstrong (26 November 1928 – 14 December 2010) was an Irish teacher and pioneer of multi-denominational education in Ireland.

== Early life and education ==
Florence Armstrong, known as Florrie, was born in Drumalure, County Cavan on 26 November 1928. Her parents were Thomas and Elizabeth Armstrong (née Dunne). She had three brothers. The family lived in Belturbet, where her father was a clerk in the railway office. Armstrong was educated at Coláiste Mobhí, Phoenix Park, Dublin, an Irish language school. In 1947 she was awarded a sizarship in Irish, going on to study at Trinity College Dublin, graduating with a BA in languages in 1951. After she graduated, she returned to Cavan to take up the position of principal at the one-teacher national school at Bocade Glebe, Kildallan. She received her H.Dip.Ed. from Trinity in 1954, becoming principal at St Patrick's, a one-teacher national school in Dalkey, County Dublin.

== Career ==
St Patrick's was in a poor state, and at the time Armstrong arrived in 1954 it was housed in a church hall, with 16 students. It was under the patronage of the local Church of Ireland parish. Through Armstrong's efforts, the student numbers grew to 69 by 1965 taught by 3 teachers, growing to 200 students in 1971. Supported by the local rector, and school manager, Desmond Murray, the school welcomed children from all denominations. Armstrong introduced a novel child-centred educational model, and in 1971 the school had been selected to pilot a new curriculum developed by the Department of Education. The school soon became overcrowded, and when Murray moved to another parish in 1970, the new school managers were not in favour of so many non-Protestants using Church of Ireland resources. They insisted that the admissions policy be reviewed, and at the same time local conservative Catholics opposed children being educated at a non-sectarian ethos school. The Minister for Education, Richard Burke, a conservative Catholic, refused to sanction further expansion of St Patrick's. In 1974, the school announced it would not be taking any junior infant students that year.

Armstrong was a firm believer that parents should be treated as partners within the school, and encouraged their active participation in teaching. She and her supporters fought attempts to reverse her innovations for 3 years, culminating in a group of parents fighting for multi-denominational education in the face of the educational and church authorities challenging Armstrong's "learn together" ethos. The parent-teacher association passed a vote of no confidence in the school manager at the 1974 AGM, and requested he resign. When he refused, the school became the centre of a national discussion on multi-denominational education in Ireland. Armstrong took a leave of absence in 1974 when there was no consensus on the school's new policies. She travelled to Nigeria on secondment as a curriculum advisor. Nigeria was emerging from civil war, and Armstrong aimed to change how teachers were trained, and to implement an integrated primary educational programme with a new curriculum. She remained there to take a post as principal of a large girls' school in Bida.

In her absence, some of the parents in Dalkey refused to abandon her plans for a multi or non-denominational school, forming an association to investigate the possibility of founding a school outside the dominant, religious denominational schooling system. This led to the founding of the Dalkey School Project (DSP) in 1975. It was widely condemned by the local Catholic church. This school would go on to be the first in what would become known as the Educate Together movement. After the 1977 election, the school received support from the new minister for education, John Patrick Wilson. Armstrong was offered the post of principal, which she accepted despite being seriously ill in Nigeria when she received the offer. Opening in a private house in Monkstown in September 1978, the new school was staffed by Armstrong and 2 teachers with 92 students. She oversaw the expansion of the school, which saw several moves to larger premises. She retired in 1990 from a purpose-built school with over 300 students and 10 teachers in Glenageary, Dún Laoghaire.

== Later life ==
She returned to work as an educational consultant with the Agency for Personal Service Overseas and for Irish Aid in Africa. She was part of the educational project in Kasama in northern Zambia which developed a programme to train teachers and focused on educating girls. She was the first recipient of the Educate Together Seed Award in 2006, and in 2008 was the guest of honour at a ceremony in Áras an Uachtaráin marking the 30th anniversary of the opening of the first Educate Together school. Armstrong died in St Vincent's University Hospital, Dublin on 14 December 2010.
