= Dalkey School Project =

School in Dublin, Ireland

The Dalkey School Project is a school in Glenageary, County Dublin in Ireland. It was set up on 18 September 1978 by parents in Dublin who wanted their children to attend a Multidenominational school.

At the time the vast majority of primary schools were National schools, which had religious patrons.

Support for such a school came from Jack Lynch, leader of Fianna Fáil, the Labour Party, and some members of Fine Gael. However the minister for education, Richard Burke was not sympathetic.

During the years 1975–1978, the project members were involved in extensive correspondence with the Department of Education and other bodies in order to prove the need for the school.

The school opened in 1978 with 90 pupils, largely due to the support of the newly elected Fianna Fáil government, with Florence Armstrong as the Principal. Opposition came from a group calling itself Council for Social Concern and some also came from obstructing of planning permission according to Michael Johnston, who was chairman of the project. The school operated from various temporary premises until a dedicated school building was opened in 1983.

In 1984, Educate Together was founded, a coordinating committee to coordinate efforts of groups trying to organize multi-denominational schools in the Republic of Ireland.

== See also ==
- Education in the Republic of Ireland
