= Pragna Patel =

Women's rights activist and business leader

- Organization: Southall Black Sisters
- Known for: Feminist activist and campaigner
- Awards: Bob Hepple Equality Award

Pragna Patel

Pragna Patel was the Director of Southall Black Sisters, a women's rights organisation in London, UK. She was a founding member, chair and Director.

Patel is also a co-founder of Women Against Fundamentalism.

She trained as a lawyer and writes about race, gender and religion.

In 2011, she was named by The Guardian as one of the Top 100 Women Activists and Campaigners.

She has an honorary Doctorate from Keele University for her outstanding contribution to women's rights and a Bob Hepple Equality Award alongside Mauro Cabral of GATE.

She has said: "It is only through activism that that we can truly honour those who came before us to fight for the rights and freedoms that we currently enjoy and it is only through activism that can we encourage others to feel empowered and to form part of wider social movements that carry the promise of change."
