= Mulhuddart =

Outer suburb of Dublin, Ireland

Mulhuddart Mullach Eadrad (Irish)
- Suburb
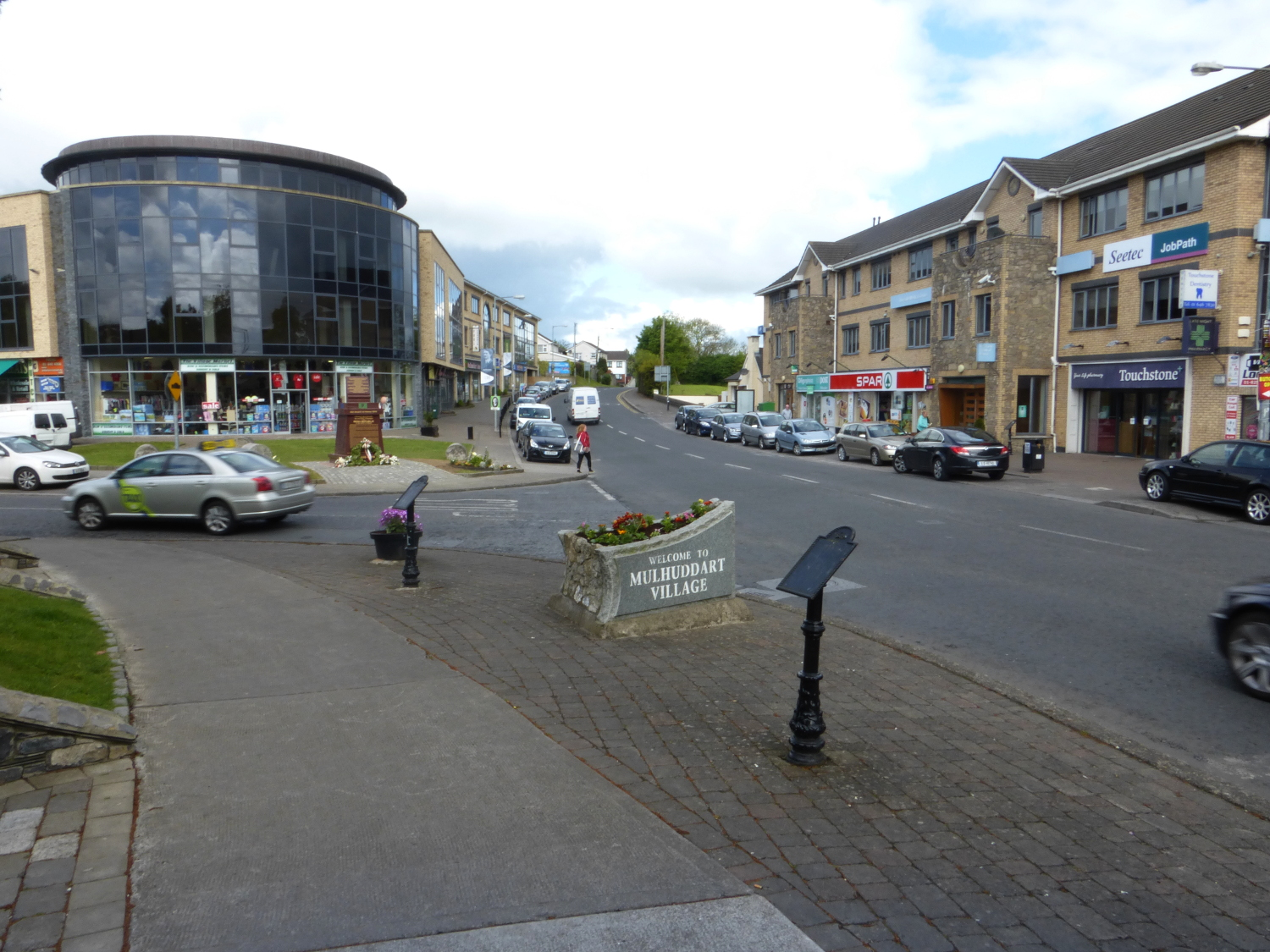
- Main junction at Mulhuddart

- Location in Dublin
- Coordinates: 53.4028°N 6.39816°W
- Country: Ireland
- Province: Leinster
- County: County Dublin
- Local government area: Fingal
- Dáil constituency: Dublin West
- EU Parliament constituency: Dublin

Population (2011)
  - Urban: 3,866
- Eircode routing key: D15
- Dialing code: 01, +353 1

Mulhuddart (Irish: Mullach Eadrad, meaning 'the hill of the milking place') is an outer suburb of Dublin, Ireland. It is 12 kilometres (7 mi) north-west of Dublin city centre. The River Tolka passes near the village.

Mulhuddart is also a civil parish in the barony of Castleknock in County Dublin.

== History ==
=== Placenames ===
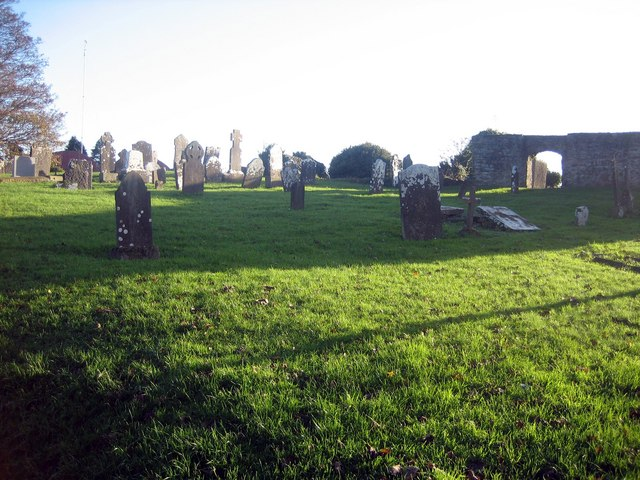
Mulhuddart Old Church and Graveyard

The origins and meaning of the name Mulhuddart are unknown. However, a number of explanations are offered, the most likely being that the name came from the Irish Mullach Eadartha meaning "the hill of the milking place". In ancient Ireland, cows were driven out onto upland pastures during the summer months, and special places were designated for their milking.

Many townland names surrounding the village owe their origins to Norman settlers who colonised the area after the Norman capture of Dublin in 1170. "Buzzardstown" is so-called after the family of William Bossard, and "Tyrrellstown" is named after a branch of the Tyrrells, who were created barons of Castleknock in 1173.

The townland of Goddamendy is perhaps the only townland in Ireland containing a prayer in its name. Tradition has it that when a priest arrived late for the anointing of a dying man, the dead man's relative cursed the priest, who replied "May God amend thee!"

=== Built heritage ===
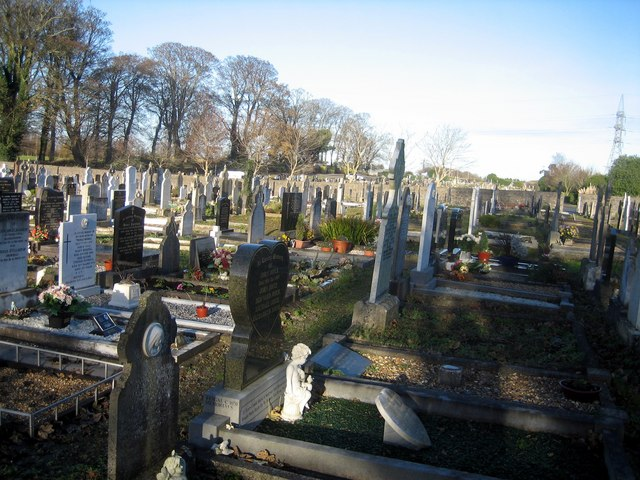
Mulhuddart Graveyard

There are a number of antiquities and old houses in the area. These include the ruins of the Church of Mary, Our Lady's Well which was used widely by pilgrims back in the early century, Mulhuddart National School and Parlickstown House. The Ordnance Survey of Ireland Sheet 50 map also shows a graveyard and burial ground at Cloghran.

Muluddart Church, the Church of Mary, stands above the village on a hill. The church stands on a curved mound, suggesting it was built on the site of an earlier church, which was protected by an enclosure. The current ruins post-date the Anglo-Norman settlement of the area.

=== 1916 Easter Rising centenary monument ===
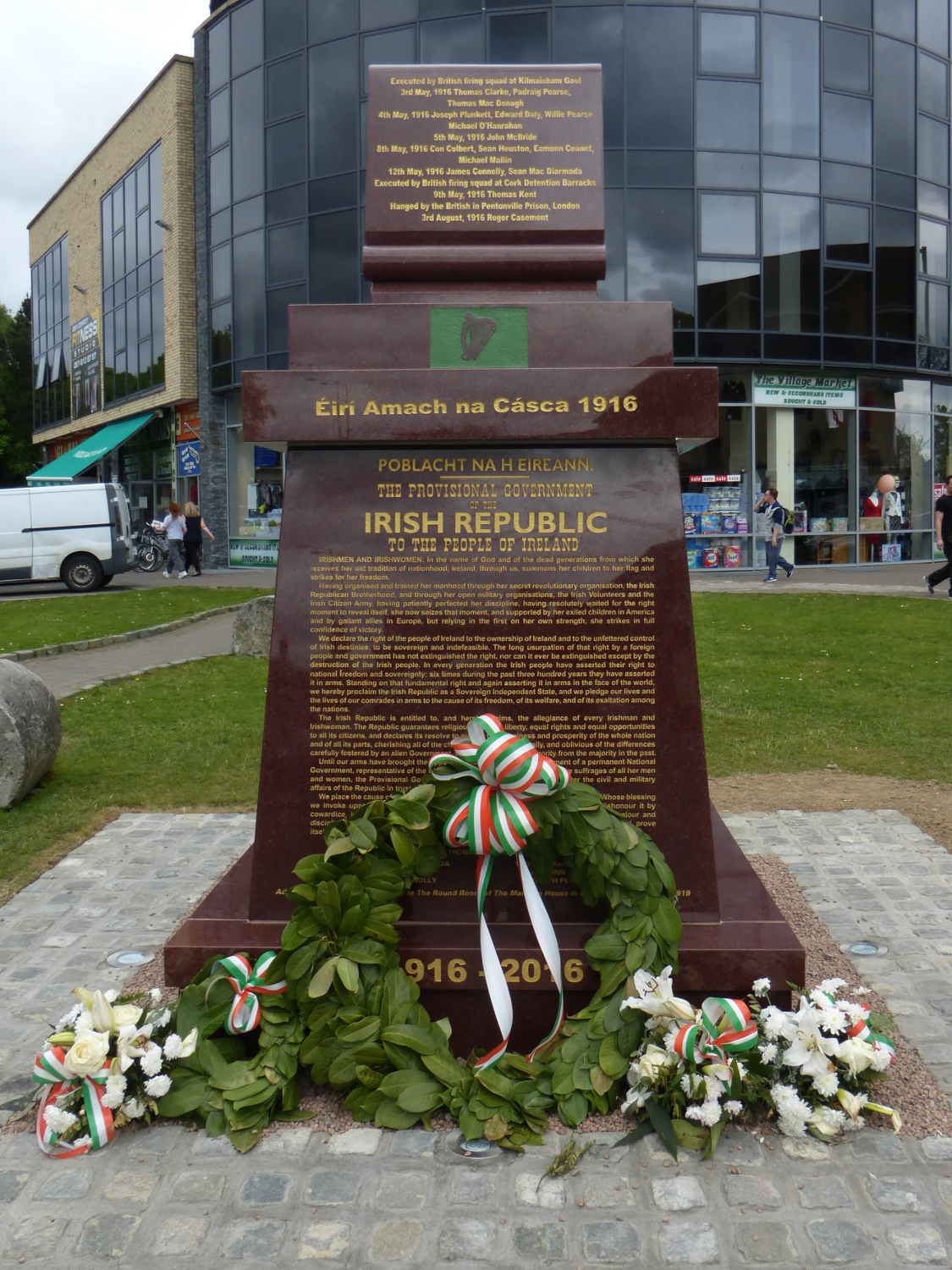
Proclamation memorial monument in Mulhuddart

In May 2016, a centenary monument was unveiled at the main junction of Mulhuddart to commemorate the executed leaders of the 1916 Easter Rising. As well as including the names of the executed leaders, the monument is inscribed with the 1916 Proclamation on the front. On the back, it is inscribed with the Democratic Programme adopted by the First Dáil. The memorial was funded entirely by donations from the local community at the cost of €14,000.

== Location and access ==
The N3 dual carriageway now bypasses the village. It is located near Blanchardstown, now one of the largest suburbs of Dublin. It is bordered by County Meath to the west and by the civil parishes of Ward to the north, Finglas to the east and Clonsilla to the south.

Mulhuddart village essentially comprises a main street, which was the old Navan Road, on which there is a petrol station, a few shops and cafés. Though the village has been bypassed, an underpass connects the main street to Blakestown. Mulhuddart includes the suburban localities of Ladyswell and Manorfield, together with townlands such as Priesttown. Newer estates to the west of the village, such as Swallowbrook and Pheasant's Run, are within the townland of Mulhuddart.

Located on the outskirts of the village is the Damastown Industrial Estate, one of Dublin's largest industrial estates, which includes a large IBM campus employing over 4,000 people. To the north is the village of Tyrrelstown, with a sizable modern housing development.

Public transport in Mulhuddart is provided by Dublin Bus routes 38, 38a, 38b, 39n and 220.

== Education ==
Primary schools in the area include St Patrick's National School (boys and girls, Roman Catholic, in the parish of Corduff), and Scoil An Cheathair Alainn (boys and girls, also Roman Catholic, located in Mulhuddart).

== Administration and politics ==
Mulhuddart is administered by Fingal County Council. For elections to Dáil Éireann, it is in the Dublin West constituency. It is in the European Parliament constituency of Dublin.

== Religion ==
Mulhuddart is a parish in the Blanchardstown deanery of the Roman Catholic Archdiocese of Dublin.

== See also ==
- List of towns and villages in Ireland
