= London Black Women's Project =

Non-governmental organisation in London

- Abbreviation: LBWP
- Predecessor: Newham Asian Women’s Collective
- Merged into: 1987
- Formation: 1981
- Founded at: Newham, United Kingdom
- Merger of: East London Asian Women’s Group (ELAWG)
- Type: Non-governmental organization
- VAT ID no.: 2393931
- Registration no.: 1001834
- Legal status: Charity
- Purpose: Supporting women and girls who have experienced domestic or sexual violence, and abuse.
- Headquarters: 661 Barking Road
- Location: London E13 9EX, United Kingdom
- Origins: Newham Asian Women’s Project (NAWP) founded in 1981
- Region served: London, United Kingdom
- Services: Seven refuges for Black, Asian and minoritised women fleeing domestic violence or seeking safety
- Secessions: Imaan LGBTQI Muslim Support
- Revenue: £1,583,130 (2023)
- Expenses: £1,496,010 (2023)
- Funding: Donations, government contracts and government grants
- Staff: 17 employees (2023)
- Volunteers: 8 trustees (2023)
- Website: Official website
- Formerly called: Newham Asian Women’s Collective; Newham Asian Women’s Project

London Black Women's Project (LBWP) is a voluntary sector organization providing support services to BME women in East London. Known as Newham Asian Women's Project (NAWP) until 2017, the organization was established in 1987 to provide women's refuges and other support services to Asian women in the London Borough of Newham.

== Newham Asian Women's Project ==
Newham Asian Women's Collective (NAWC), a predecessor of NAWP, was established in 1981 to campaign for and support the needs of South Asian women in Newham. NAWC found that racism obstructed access to services for South Asian women experiencing domestic violence. NAWC expanded into neighbouring boroughs in East London, resulting in the founding of East London Asian Women's Group (ELAWG).

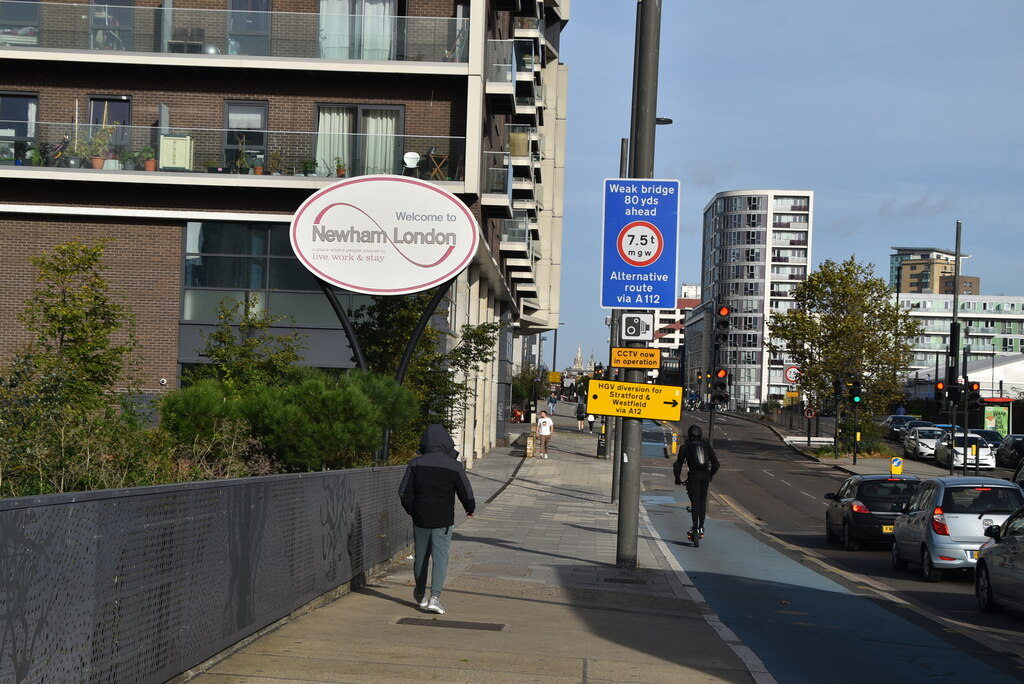
Newham, London serves as the headquarters of the LBWP

In 1987 Newham Asian Women's Project was established, opening a hostel providing emergency accommodation to women and children escaping domestic violence. Gulshun Rehman was one of the founders. NAWP subsequently grew to include a resource centre, refuge and second-stage hostel. In 1997 a counselling service was established for girls and women aged 12 to 55. NAWP offered information, advice, counselling and befriending services in the five major languages of Gujarati, Urdu, Hindi, Punjabi and Bengali. Analysis of the women attending its mental health and counselling support groups showed that three out of five of its clients attempted self-harm. The project's 1998 research report, Growing Up Young, Asian and Female in Britain, aimed to understand why self-harm and suicide were so prevalent among young British Asian women, and make recommendations aimed at improving the situation.

== London Black Women's Project ==
In 2015 it was agreed to expand the project's provision, and rename the project accordingly, and on International Women's Day 2016 the project was renamed London Black Women's Project.

As part of a nationwide funding crisis for specialist providers of BME refuges, the London Black Women's Project was threatened in 2019 with the loss of its council contract to run Newham's refuges for domestic and sexual violence victims. After protests from local campaigners and women's organizations, the decision was reversed in November 2019, and LBWP's contract was extended for another year.

The organization's patron is the actress and writer Meera Syal.

== See also ==
- Domestic violence in the United Kingdom
- Southall Black Sisters
- Refuge (United Kingdom charity)
