= Mountain Rescue Ireland =

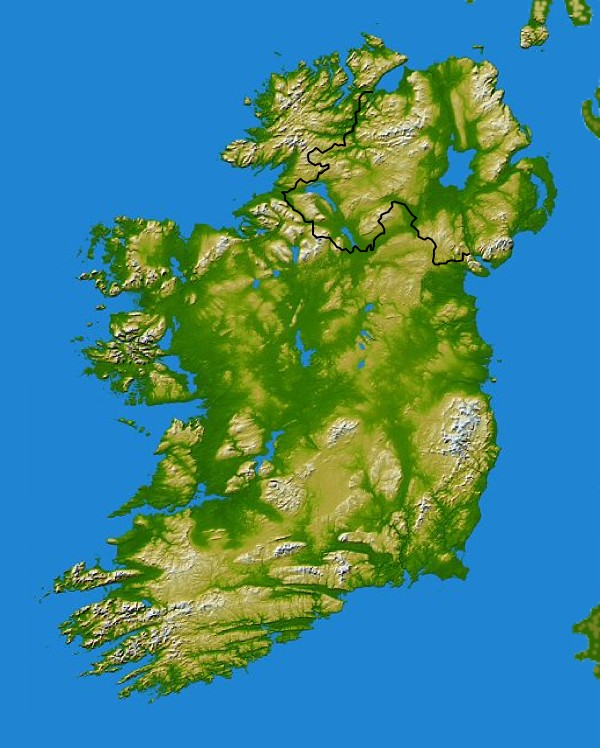
- Scope of MRI services
- Abbreviation: MRI
- Formation: 1965; 61 years ago
- Purpose: Mountain rescue
- Region served: Northern Ireland; Republic of Ireland
- Main organ: Committee
- Affiliations: International Commission for Alpine Rescue
- Volunteers: circa 400 across the 11 member teams
- Website: mountainrescue.ie

Mountain Rescue Ireland (Irish: Cumann Tarrthála Sléibhte na h-Éireann) is the representative body for mountain rescue services on the island of Ireland. It has eleven member organisations - ten regional mountain rescue teams and one national canine search team (SARDA). Mountain Rescue Ireland (MRI) is a member of the International Commission for Alpine Rescue (IKAR-CISA).

Mountain rescue teams in Ireland are independent charities whose membership consists of highly trained volunteers who are called out by the Garda Síochána in the Republic of Ireland or the coastguard, Police Service of Northern Ireland, or Northern Ireland Ambulance Service in Northern Ireland. The teams affiliated to MRI cover all the major mountain areas in Ireland and though each team covers a defined area, the teams also support each other as required. The teams are also supported by SARDA Ireland, (Search and Rescue Dog Association-Ireland) and also co-operate with the Irish Cave Rescue Organisation (ICRO).

SARDA Ireland is a voluntary emergency search and rescue organisation concerned with the training, assessment and deployment of search and rescue dogs, to search for missing persons in the mountains, woodlands rural and urban areas including rivers, lakes and seashores, as well as avalanches and demolished buildings.

== Organisation ==
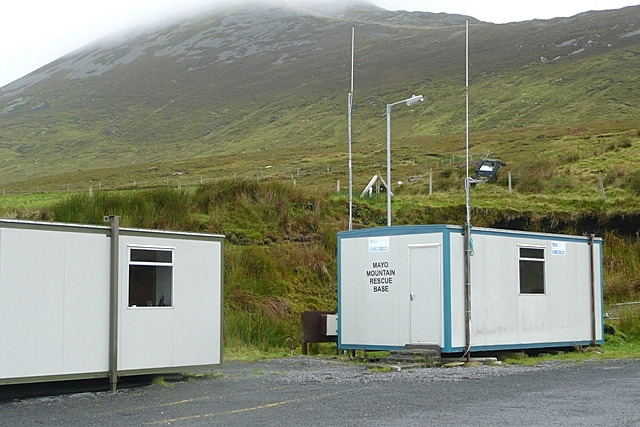
Mayo Mountain Rescue Base near Croagh Patrick

The 11 teams which comprise Mountain Rescue Ireland, with their operational areas, are as follows:

- Donegal Mountain Rescue Team cover the upland areas of Donegal.
- Dublin & Wicklow Mountain Rescue Team cover the upland areas of counties Dublin and Wicklow.
- Galway Mountain Rescue Team cover the upland areas of counties Galway and Clare.
- Glen of Imaal Red Cross Mountain Rescue Team cover the upland areas of counties Dublin and Wicklow.
- Kerry Mountain Rescue Team cover the upland areas of County Kerry and west Cork.
- Mayo Mountain Rescue Team cover the upland areas of County Mayo.
- Mourne Mountain Rescue Team cover the Mourne Mountains in County Down.
- North West Mountain Rescue Team cover the Belfast Hills, glens and upland areas of County Antrim, County Fermanagh and the Sperrin Mountains.
- SARDA Ireland is the Search and Rescue Dogs Association Ireland which works across the island of Ireland.
- Sligo/Leitrim Mountain Rescue Team cover the upland areas of counties Sligo and Leitrim.
- South Eastern Mountain Rescue Association (SEMRA) cover the upland areas of south-eastern Ireland including the Galtee, Comeragh, Knockmealdown, Ballyhoura and Blackstairs mountain ranges.
