= Hollystown =

Outer suburb of Dublin, Ireland

Hollystown Baile an Alabhóidigh (Irish)
- Suburb
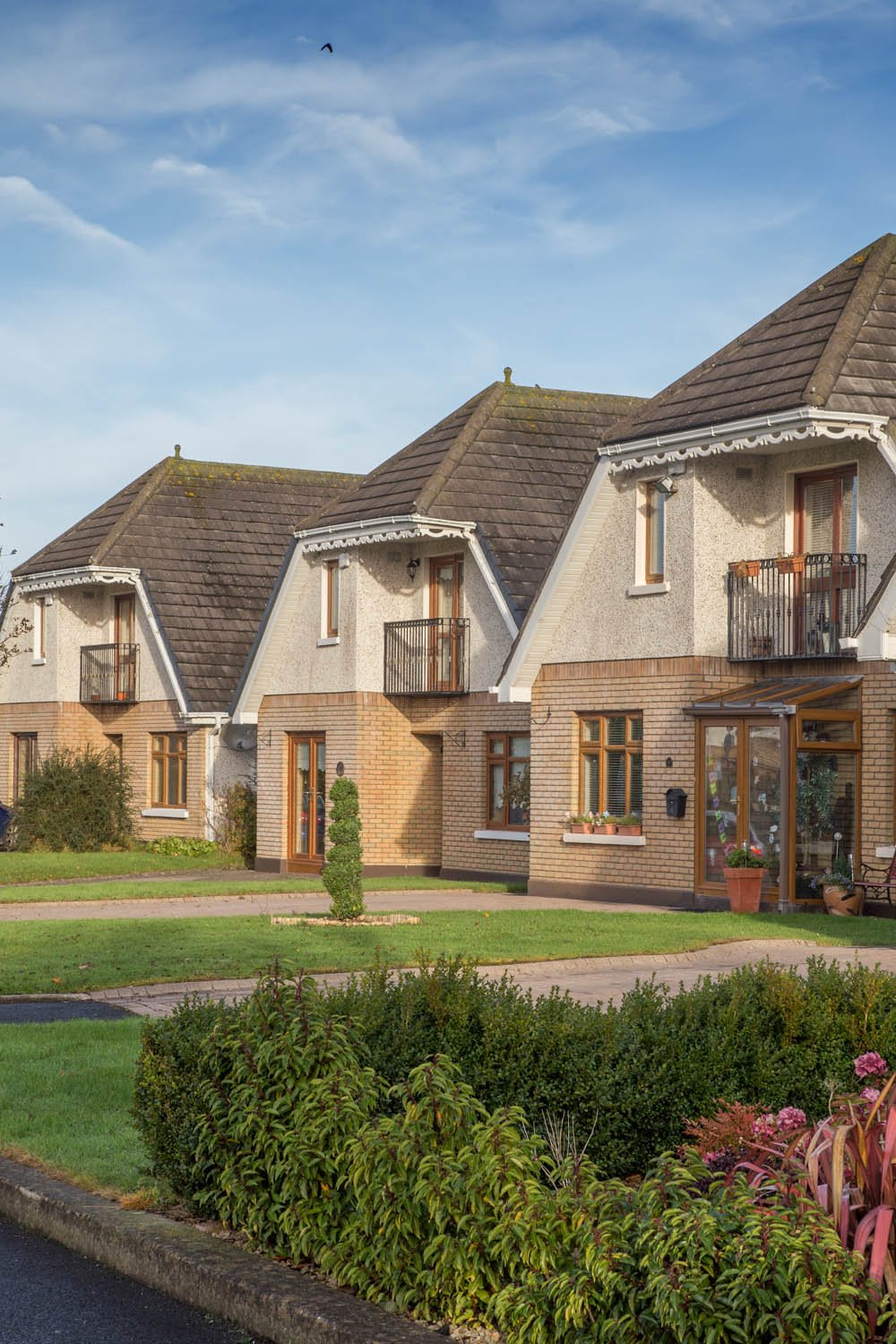
- Hollystown Demesne in Hollystown

- Location in Dublin
- Coordinates: 53°25′42″N 6°22′49″W
- Country: Ireland
- Province: Leinster
- County: County Dublin
- Local authority: Fingal County Council
- Elevation: 75 m (246 ft)

Hollystown (Irish: Baile an Alabhóidigh) is an outer western suburb of Dublin, bordering County Meath. It is close to Tyrrelstown and Blanchardstown in Dublin, and Kilbride and Dunboyne in County Meath, and is in the Dublin 15 postal district. Developed on a greenfield basis since the 1990s, the area has seen significant development since 2016 with the establishment of neighbourhoods such as Hollywoodrath, Bellingsmore and Kilmartin Grove.

Hollystown was previously known for a championship golf course, which closed in 2019.
