= Paul Rowe (educationalist) =

Paul Rowe is an Irish educationalist and former CEO of Educate Together. He became CEO of the educational charity in 2002. In October 2019, it was announced that he would be replaced as CEO by Emer Nowland. Rowe has criticised denominational education on human rights grounds.
