= Damastown =

Townland near Dublin, Ireland

Damastown Baile Dama (Irish)
- Townland
- Location in Dublin
- Coordinates: 53°24′44″N 6°25′30″W
- Country: Ireland
- Province: Leinster
- County: County Dublin
- Local authority: Fingal County Council

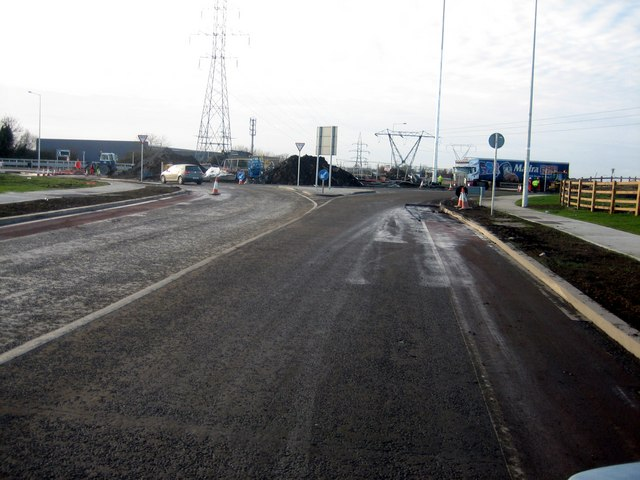
Damastown Avenue.

Damastown (Irish: Baile Dama) is a townland in the civil parish of Mulhuddart in Fingal, County Dublin, Ireland. The townland is located west of the village of Mulhuddart and is north of the N3 road. A 1.8 km (1.1 mi) link road is nearing completion to link Damastown to the Cruiserath Road intersecting Church Road which links Mulhuddart to Tyrrelstown.

The area is primarily laid out as an industrial estate, and companies with premises there include IBM and Gem Pack Foods. A temporary recycling centre was set up in Damastown to allow for an upgrade to the Coolmine recycling centre.

The River Tolka and at least two tributary streams pass through the area.

== History ==
There are some brief historical references to Damastown, Mulhuddart in volume 6 of a series of books called A History of the County Dublin by Francis Elrington Ball published between 1902 and 1920.
