= Educate Together =

Educational charity in Ireland

- The current logo, in use since 2013
- Founded: 1984; 42 years ago
- Type: Educational
- Registration no.: CHY 11816
- Location: Ireland
- Services: Primary education; Secondary education; Teacher training; Advocacy
- Website: educatetogether.ie

Educate Together (Irish: Ag Foghlaim Le Chéile) is an educational charity in Ireland which is the patron body to "equality-based, co-educational, child centred, and democratically run" schools. It was founded in 1984 to act as the patron body for the new multidenominational schools that opened after the establishment of the Dalkey School Project. As of 2026, Educate Together is the patron of 97 national schools and 21 second-level schools in Ireland. There are also four Educate Together primary schools in England.

In 2014 three Educate Together Second Level Schools opened in Dublin 15, Drogheda and Lucan along with the first Educate Together school outside Ireland, in Bristol in the United Kingdom. In joint patronage with Kildare and Wicklow ETB, Educate Together opened another second-level school, Celbridge Community School, in 2015.

== History ==
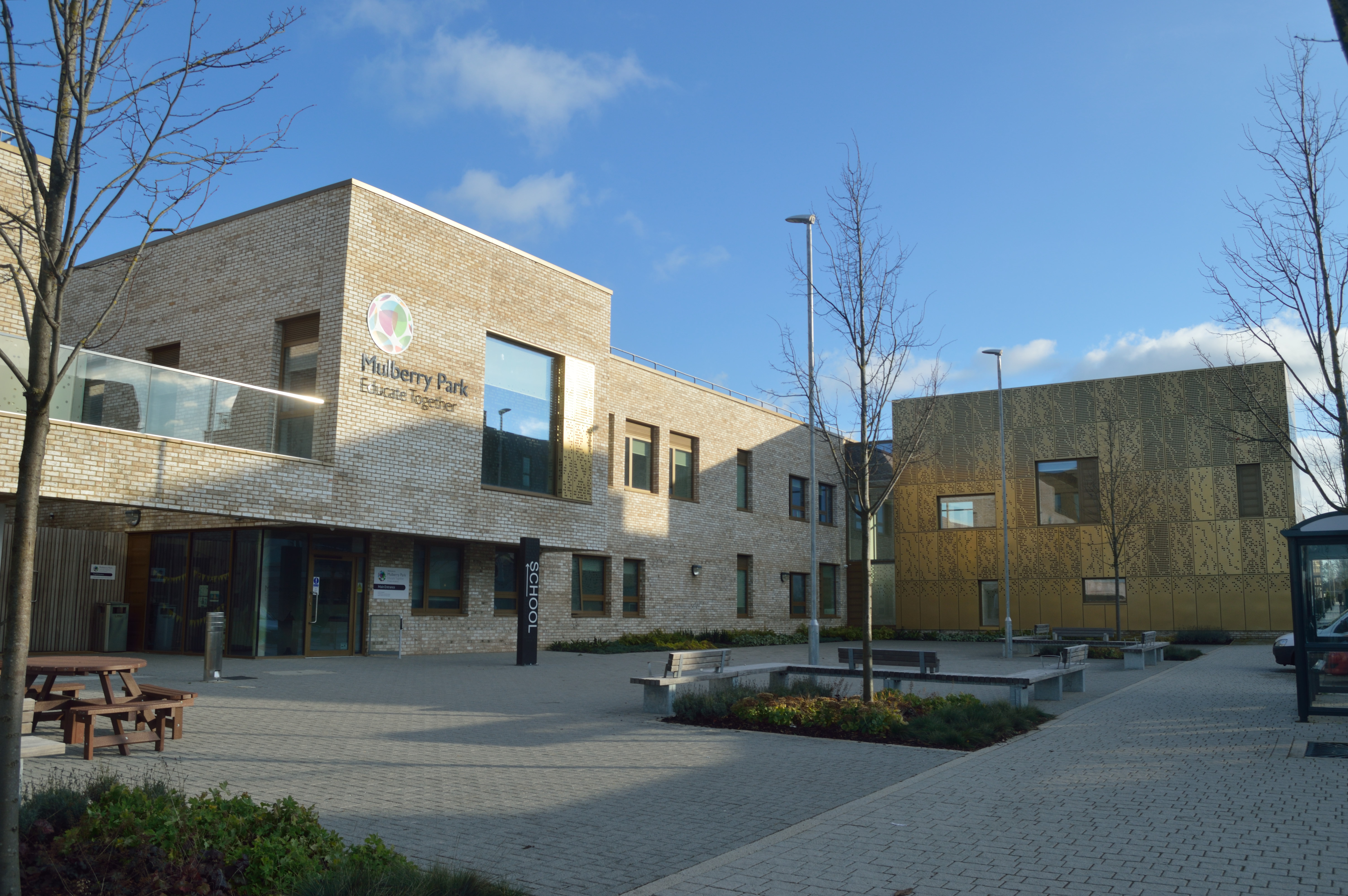
Educate Together school in Bath, England

Educate Together has its roots in the Dalkey School Project founded in the 1970s. Before multi-denominational education, some of those involved in education in Ireland, such as Áine Hyland, Michael Johnston and Florrie Armstrong, questioned the denominational nature of the system and the need to have students of different faiths in different schools. This group of educationalists and parents established the organisation with the stated aim:

"To develop and support in Ireland the establishment of schools which are multi-denominational (i.e. with equal right of access for the children of Catholic, Protestant and other parents, and with the cultural and social background of each child held in equal respect), co-educational and managed under a system which is predominantly democratic in character, wherever and whenever there is viable local support for such a school".

The organisers of the school met opposition from a conservative Catholic group that circulated a leaflet in the Dalkey area alleging that the new school was "atheistic", "divisive", "hostile to religion" and "a precedent for major trouble in other areas".

As of 2016, the majority of primary schools in Ireland were owned by religious communities (or boards of governors). Of the 3,200 primary schools in Ireland, only 2% are multidenominational.

The Dalkey School Project was founded in 1975. The school opened at the start of the 1978–79 school year in temporary premises with Florrie Armstrong as the school principal.

By 1984 two other multi-denominational schools had been started and Educate Together was established as a co-ordinating umbrella body. The organisation became a company limited by guarantee in 1998, and from the year 2000, all new Educate Together schools operate with the patronage of the national company. Educate Together has charitable status in Ireland.

In 2016, Educate Together was awarded Secularist of the Year by the UK's National Secular Society, for putting "secularist principles into action and [demonstrating] what a 21st century secular education system should look like – children and young people educated together, taught an ethical education curriculum in a school with an inclusive ethos without any imposition of religion".

=== Growth ===
The number of schools run by the organisation has grown: in 2007 it was 40, in 2008 it was 44 and by 2018 this number had risen to over 100 including its second-level schools and its schools in the UK. In terms of pupil numbers, 2018 was the first year in which there were over 25,000 students attending an Educate Together school. By 2009 Educate Together had become the fastest-growing patron of schools in Ireland. In 2015, three new schools opened in Tuam, County Galway, Pelletstown, Dublin and New Ross, County Wexford and one in Kildare.

== Ethos ==
Educate Together schools seek to "guarantee equality of access and esteem" to children irrespective of their social, cultural or religious background. Educate Together schools seek to be "learner centred" in their approach to education, and are intended to be run as "participatory democracies, with respectful partnership between parents, pupils and teachers".

== Curriculum ==
Educate Together schools teach the Irish Primary School Curriculum, which includes 30 minutes a day (2 hours 30 minutes per week) to be spent on faith formation. In an Educate Together school this time is spent teaching their Learn Together Ethical Education Curriculum rather than the religious instructions programmes taught in denominational schools. There are four strands to this programme.

- Moral and Spiritual: children learn about feelings and values, the development of conscience, choices and consequences, stillness and meditation.
- Equality and Justice: children learn about wants and needs, rights and responsibilities; the promotion of equality and the nature of democracy locally (student councils are encouraged), nationally and globally.
- Belief Systems: children learn about the rites and ceremonies, celebrations, key figure and beliefs and values of the six main world religions: Islam, Christianity, Hinduism, Buddhism, Judaism and Sikhism. Schools also address Atheism, Agnosticism and Humanism.
- Ethics and the Environment: children learn about appreciation and stewardship of the natural world. Educate Together schools have an ethos of respect, diversity & inclusion.

== Primary schools ==
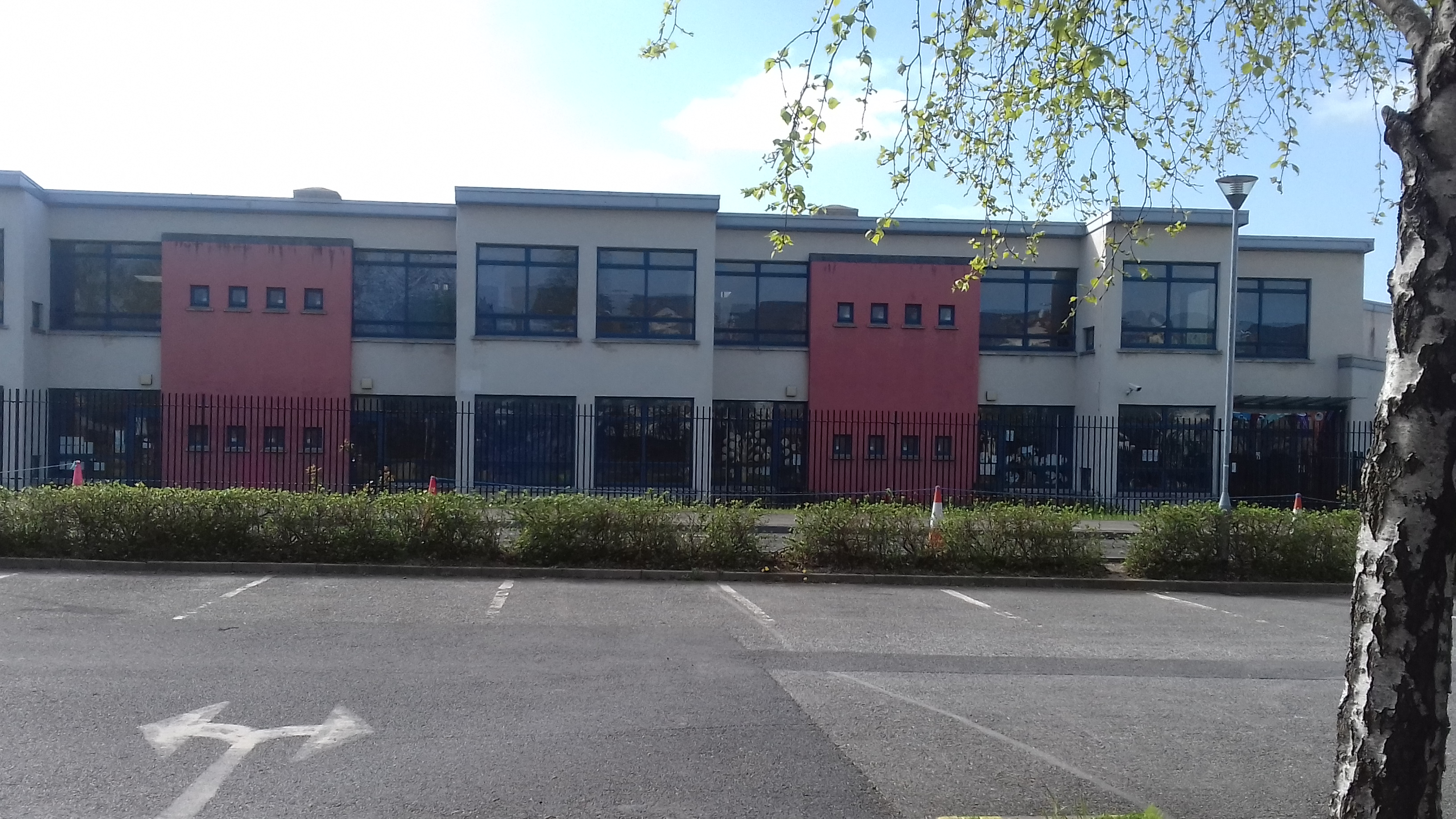
Educate Together, Castleknock, Ireland

As of 2026, there were 97 Educate Together primary schools in Ireland, in 21 different counties. In addition, the Educate Together Academy Trust in the UK had four primary schools in England.

== Second level schools ==
As of 2024, there were 21 second-level schools operating with Educate Together involved as either patron, co-patron or partner. These second-level schools aim not to 'teach to the test' but to instead develop their students' skills in creative and critical thinking, communication, teamwork, research and leadership.

Research published by Trinity College in 2008 showed that 90 per cent of parents who sent their children to an Educate Together school would send their children to a secondary school based on the same model if it was available.

Educate Together's first second-level school – Hansfield Educate Together Secondary School – received its first group of first-year students in August 2014. Educate Together is also joint patron of Kishoge Community College in Lucan and Ballymakenny College in Drogheda. It opened Celbridge Community School in August 2015 with Kildare and Wicklow Educational Training Board.

== Colleges of education ==
In the Irish system, student teachers complete their initial teacher education in state-funded, religiously run Colleges of Education, where time is set aside for Religious Education and the study of either the Catholic or Church of Ireland religious instruction programmes.

Educate Together offers a one-year, part-time postgraduate Certificate in Ethical and Multi-denominational Education in partnership with St Patrick's College of Education, Dublin.

== See also ==
- Education in the Republic of Ireland
