= Abbot of Glendalough =

Head of monastery at Glendalough

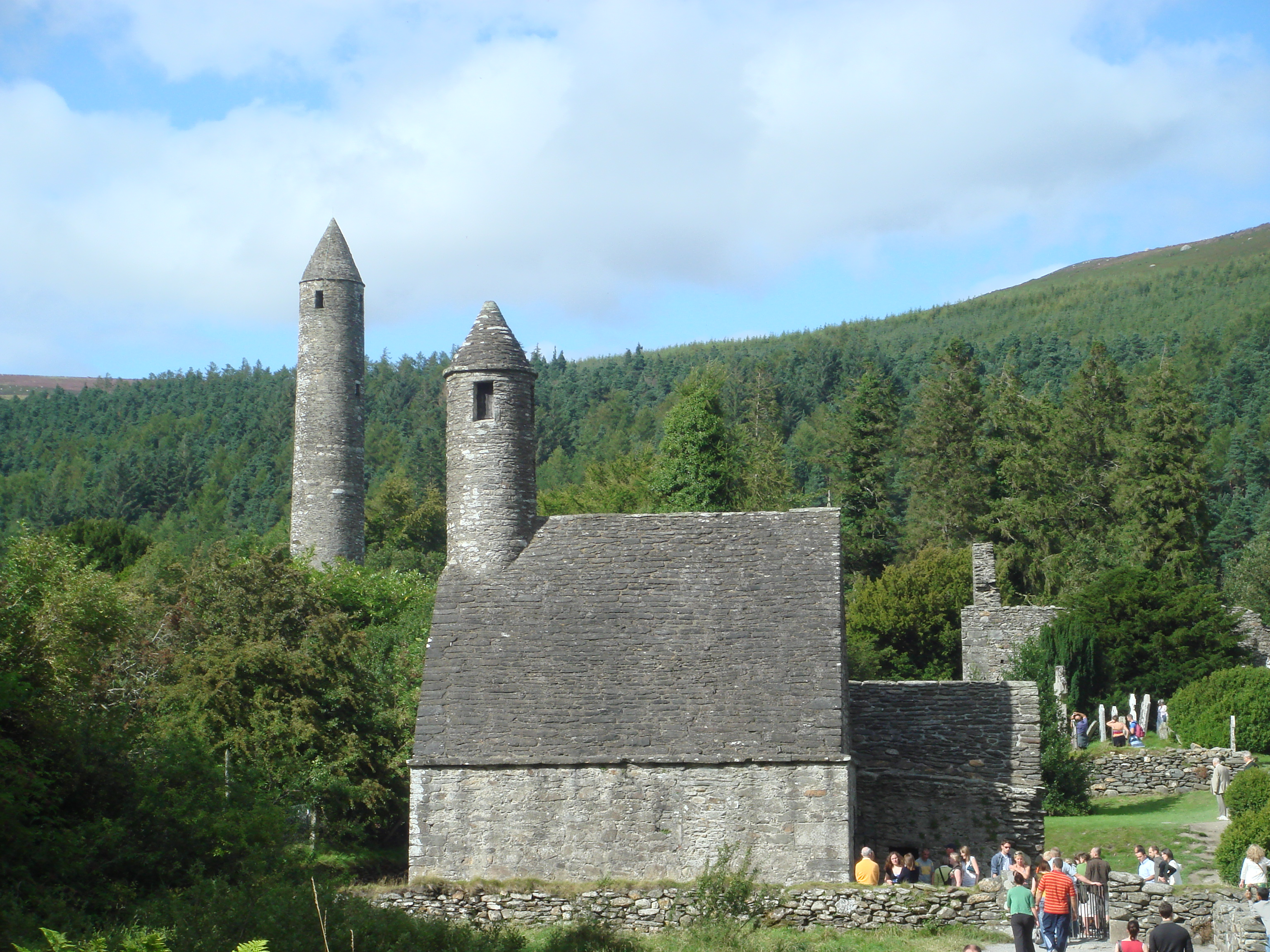
The monastery at Glendalough

The Abbot of Glendalough was the head of the monastery at Glendalough, founded by Saint Kevin in the early sixth century, which is in modern-day County Wicklow, Ireland. After the death of Saint Kevin, the abbots bore the title "Comarbai Cóemgein" (i.e. "successor of Saint Kevin"). Until the early twelfth century, a number of abbots and others at the monastery of Glendalough had also been consecrated bishops, but this did not necessarily mean they were bishops of Glendalough, since the Diocese of Glendalough was not established until the Synod of Rathbreasail in 1111.

== List of abbots ==
The following is a list of abbots and early monastic bishops. (Those who were consecrated bishops, but did not hold the office of coarb or abbot are indicated in italics and brackets):

- Saint Kevin (Cóemgen mac Cóemloga), died 3 June 618 or 622
- Colmán Cerbb, also bishop, died 12 December 657/60
- Dairchell moccu Rétai, also bishop, died 3 May 678
- Do Chumac Conóc, died 687
- Dub Gualae, died 712
- Énchorach ua Dodáin, died 769
- Máel Combair, died 790
- Ceithernach, died 799
- Mimthenach, died 800
- Áed, died 809^{[A]}
- Échtbrann, died 809^{[A]}
- Guaire, died 810
- Eterscél mac Cellaig, also bishop
- Suibne mac Ioseph, died 836
- Suibne ua Teimnén, died 842
- Daniél, also abbot of Tallaight, died 868
- Fechtnach, died 875
- Dúngal mac Baíthnine, also bishop, died 904
- Cormac mac Fidbrain, also bishop, died 927
- (Nuada, bishop, but abbot, died 930)
- Flann ua hAnaile, died 950
- Ferdomnach ua Máenaig, also abbot of Clonmacnoise, died 952
- Flann ua hÁeducáin, died 957
- Martan, also anchorite and abbot of Tallaight; died 959
- Crunnmáel, died 972
- Ailill mac Laignig, died 973
- Cairpre ua Corra, died 974
- Dúnchad ua Mancháin, died 1003
- Conn ua Diugraid, died 1014
- Flann ua Cellaig, died 1030
- Conaing ua Cerbaill, died 1031^{[B]}
- Cathassach ua Cathail, deposed 1031, died 1045^{[B]}
- Murchad ua Nióc, died 1032
- (Máel Brigte ua Máel Finn, bishop, not abbot, died 1041)
- Cináed mac Muiredaig, died 1068
- In Breithem Ua Mancháin, died 1095
- (Cormac Ua Máil, bishop, but not abbot, died 1101)
- Tuathal Ua Cathail, died 13 May 1106
- Gilla Comgaill Ua Tuathail, was killed by the Forthuatha Laigen in 1127; he was the father of Muirchertach Ua Tuathail, king of the Uí Muiredaig (1141–64), and grandfather of Lorcán Ua Tuathail (St Laurence O'Toole).
- Gilla Pátraic mac Tuathail Ua Cathail, was killed by the Uí Muiredaig in 1128; he was the son of Abbot Tuathal Ua Cathail.
- Dúnlaing Ua Cathail, died 1153
- Lorcán Ua Tuathail (St Laurence O'Toole), became abbot of Glendalough in 1154, and archbishop of Dublin in 1162, died 14 November 1180.

== Notes ==
- ^{A} It is uncertain whether Áed preceded or succeeded Échtbrann.
- ^{B} It is uncertain whether Conaing preceded or succeeded Cathassach, who was blinded by Domnall ua Dúnlaing, grandson of Dúnlaing mac Tuathail Uí Muiredaig, king of Leinster (1014).
