= Wicklow Mountains National Park =

205-square-kilometre (51,000-acre) protected area in Ireland

- IUCN category II (national park)
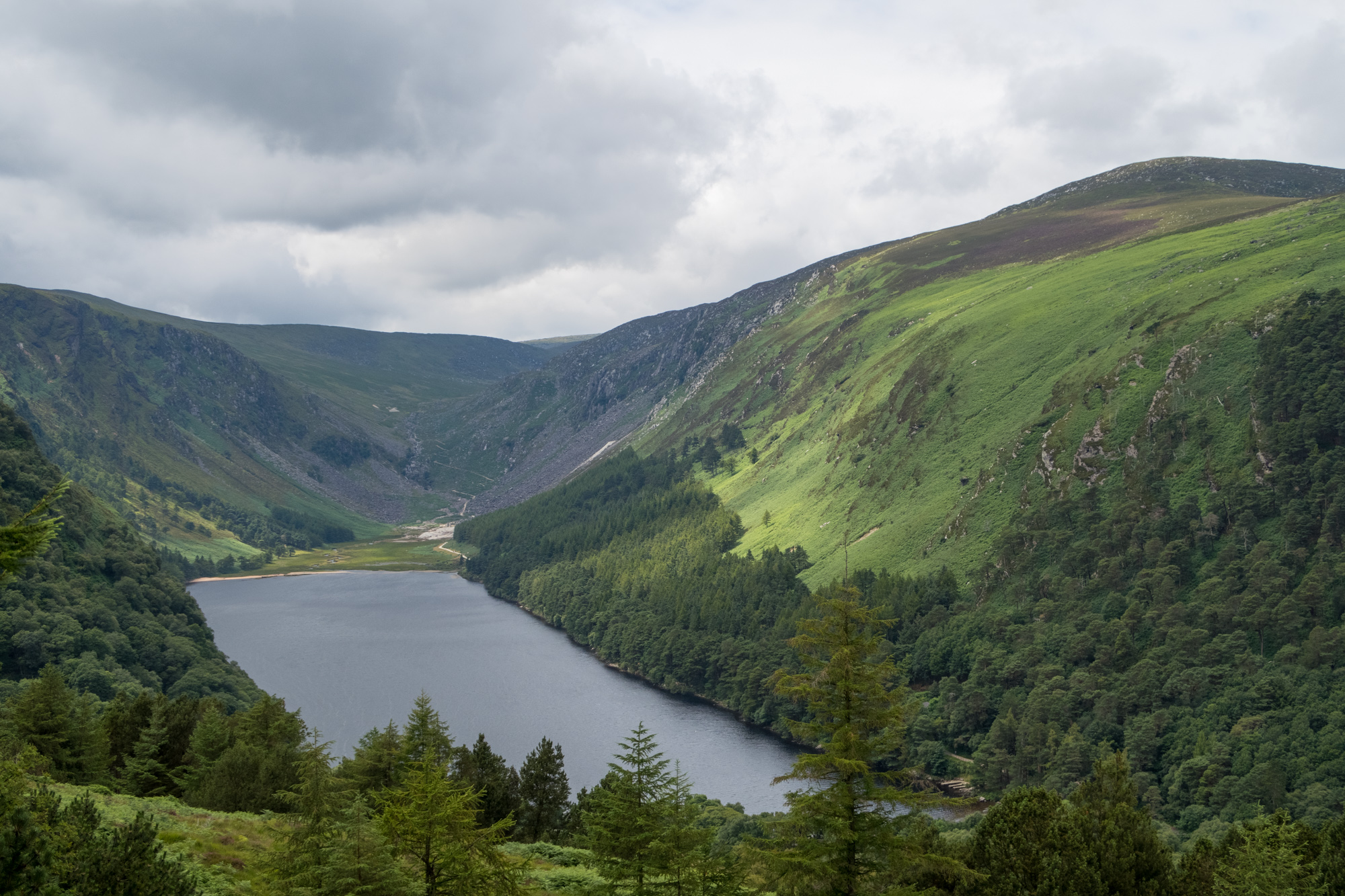
- Glendalough

- Map showing park and surrounding areas
- Location: County Wicklow, Ireland
- Nearest city: Dublin
- Coordinates: 53.018°N 6.398°W
- Area: 205 square kilometres (51,000 acres)
- Established: 1991
- Governing body: NPWS National Parks and Wildlife Service

Wicklow Mountains National Park (Irish: Páirc Náisiúnta Sléibhte Chill Mhantáin) is a 205-square-kilometre (51,000-acre) protected area in Ireland, one of eight national parks in the country. The park stretches through County Wicklow as well as small areas of South Dublin and Dún Laoghaire–Rathdown in County Dublin. The park is located in the Wicklow Mountains a short distance south of Dublin. It contains a variety of attractions that are popular with city dwellers seeking recreation, and areas visited by tourists and history enthusiasts.

== Glendalough ==
Chief among the historic sites is Glendalough, which features a collection of Early Medieval monastic structures associated with St Kevin, a hermit priest. Other sites include the Education Centre in Bolger's Cottage, on the Miners' Road by the Upper Lake, Glendalough, and remnants of mining villages.

National Parks in Ireland

== Activities and environment ==
Recreational activities available within the park include walking and hiking, rock climbing, rowing, diving, limited swimming and fishing, and many opportunities for sightseeing and photography. Motor tourists may take the R756 road which passes through the Wicklow Gap. Another scenic driving route follows the historic Military Road designated R115 from the Dublin Hills south through the centre of the mountains to Laragh village.

The variety of habitats found in the park ranges through blanket bog, deciduous woods, coniferous woods, upland grassland, heath, exposed rocky areas and scree. Numerous plant species including bluebells, wood sorrel and wood anemones, woodrush, bracken, polypody fern and various species of mosses are found. Among trees common in the park are holly, hazel and mountain ash.

Some of the protected wildlife of the park are several species of bats, rare otters, and nine threatened or internationally important species of birds including the hen harrier, peregrine falcon and whooper swan.

== Park history and management ==
Having been proposed for many years, establishment of the park was announced by Charles Haughey, the Taoiseach in 1988, at Glendalough. An interpretative centre was financed in 1990 and the park officially opened in 1991. It is managed by the National Parks and Wildlife Service under the Department of Arts, Heritage, Regional, Rural and Gaeltacht Affairs. Park staff are responsible for nature conservation, promotion of research and education, public safety and facilitation of good relations between the park and surrounding communities.

=== Additions to the national park ===
In May 2009 an addition of 28.33 square kilometres (7,000 acres) to the park was announced.

In 2016 the state purchased an additional 19.8296 square kilometres (4,900.0 acres) from a private party. The tract of land goes from Kippure down to Glenasmole Valley and Bohernabreena Reservoir. The land was added to the Wicklow National Park.
