= Glendalough =

Glacial valley and monastic settlement in County Wicklow, Ireland

- Gleann Dá Loch
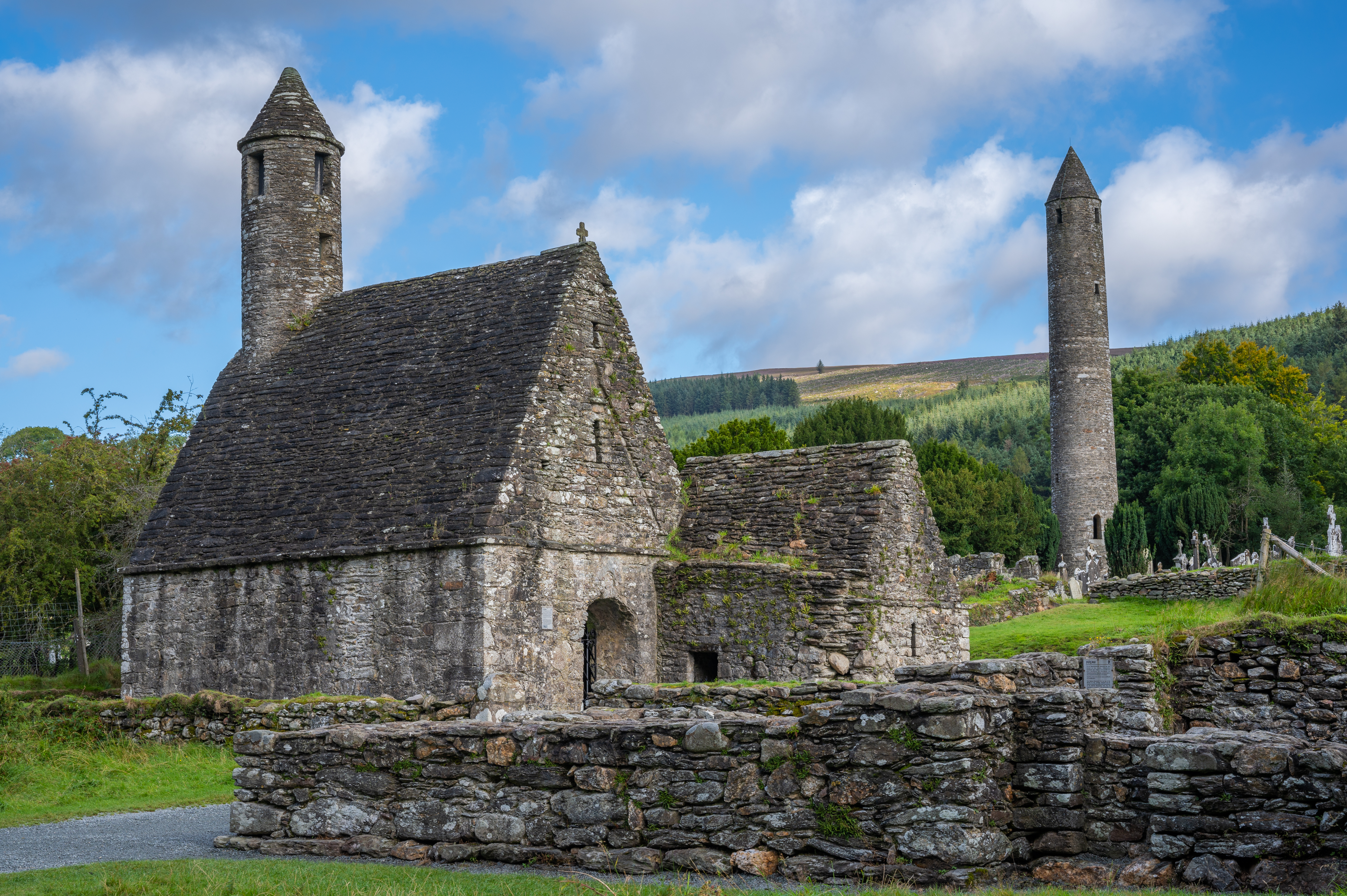

- Location within Ireland
- Interactive map of Glendalough

Monastery information
- Order: Celtic Christianity
- Established: 6th century
- Disestablished: 1398
- Diocese: Glendalough (to 1185); Dublin and Glendalough (1185–1398)

People
- Founder: Saint Kevin

Architecture
- Status: Inactive
- Style: Irish monastic, Romanesque

Site
- Location: County Wicklow
- Coordinates: 53°00′37″N 6°19′39″W
- Visible remains: Round tower, gateway, cathedral, several churches
- Public access: yes
- Website: www.glendalough.ie

Glendalough (/ˌɡlɛndəˈlɒx/; Irish: Gleann Dá Loch, meaning 'valley of two lakes') is a glacial valley in County Wicklow, Ireland, renowned for an Early Medieval monastic settlement founded in the 6th century by St Kevin. From 1825 to 1957, the head of the Glendalough Valley was the site of a galena lead mine. Glendalough is also a recreational area for picnics, for walking along networks of maintained trails of varying difficulty, and also for rock climbing.

== History ==
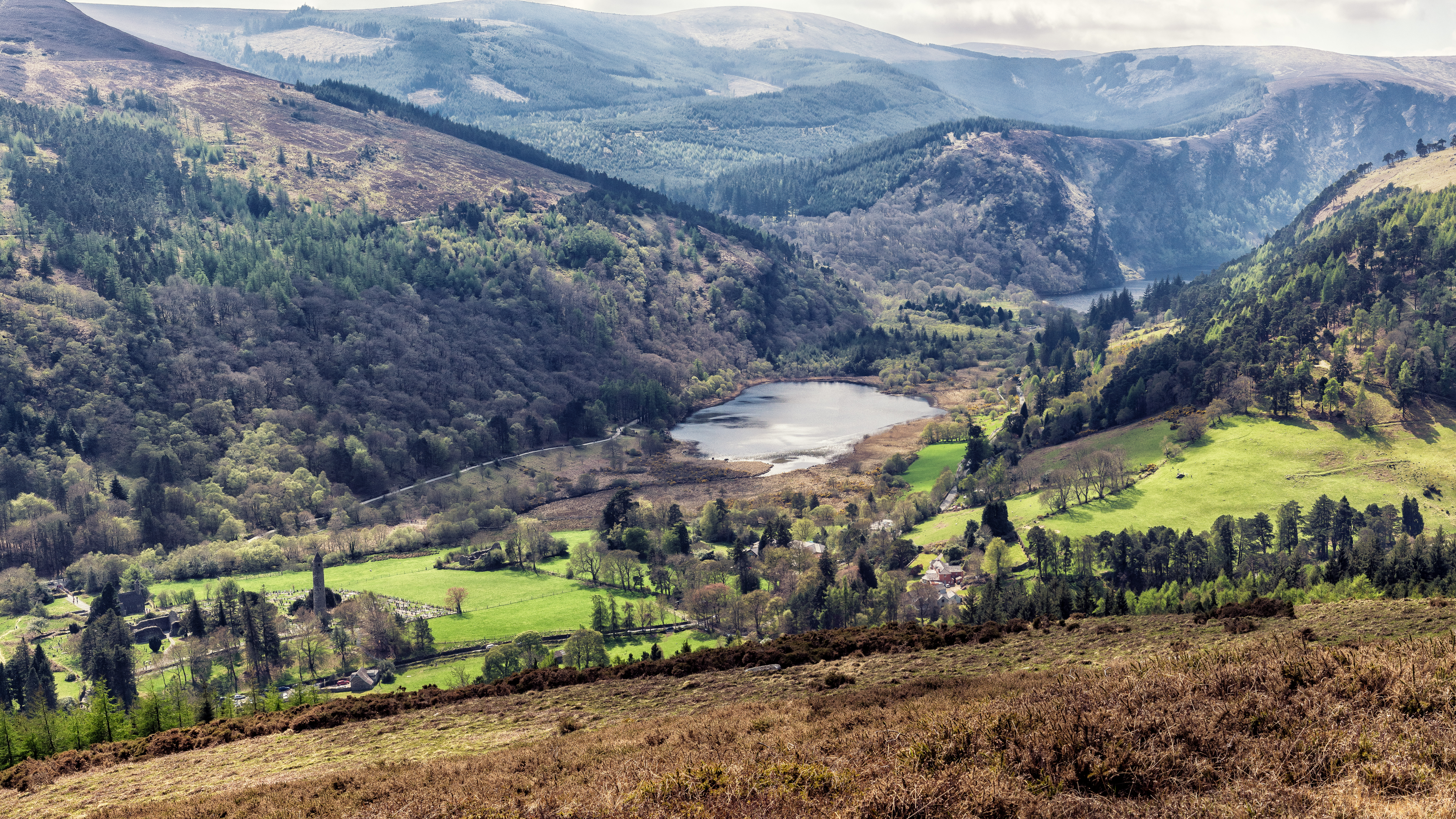
Lower Lake and Monastic Village from Brockagh Mountain

Kevin, a descendant of one of the ruling families in Leinster, studied as a boy under the care of three holy men: Eoghan, Lochan and Eanna. During this time, he went to Glendalough. He was to return later, with a small group of monks to found a monastery where the 'two rivers form a confluence'. Kevin's writings discuss his fighting "knights" at Glendalough; scholars today believe this refers to his process of self-examination and his personal temptations. His fame as a holy man spread and he attracted numerous followers. He died in about 618, traditionally on 3 June. For the next six centuries, Glendalough flourished and the Irish Annals contain references to the deaths of abbots and raids on the settlement.

Circa 1042, oak timber from Glendalough was used to build the second-longest Viking longship recorded (circa 30 m). A modern replica of that ship was built in 2004 and is currently located in Roskilde, Denmark. At the Synod of Rath Breasail in 1111, Glendalough was designated as one of the two dioceses of North Leinster. The Book of Glendalough was written there about 1131. St. Laurence O'Toole, born in 1128, became Abbot of Glendalough and was well known for his sanctity and hospitality. Even after his appointment as Archbishop of Dublin in 1162, he returned occasionally to Glendalough, to the solitude of St. Kevin's Bed. He died in Eu, in Normandy in 1180. In 1176, the Annals of Tigernach report that Glendalough was 'plundered by the foreigners'. In 1214, the dioceses of Glendalough and Dublin were united. From that time onwards, the cultural and ecclesiastical status of Glendalough diminished. The destruction of the settlement by English forces in 1398 left it a ruin but it continued as a church of local importance and a place of pilgrimage.

Glendalough is on the 1598 map "A Modern Depiction of Ireland, One of the British Isles" by Abraham Ortelius as "Glandalag". Descriptions of Glendalough from the 18th and 19th centuries include references to occasions of "riotous assembly" on the feast of St. Kevin on 3 June.

The present remains in Glendalough tell only a small part of its story. The monastery in its heyday included workshops, areas for manuscript writing and copying, guest houses, an infirmary, farm buildings and dwellings for both the monks and a large lay population. The buildings which survive probably date from between the 10th and 12th centuries.

== See of Glendalough ==
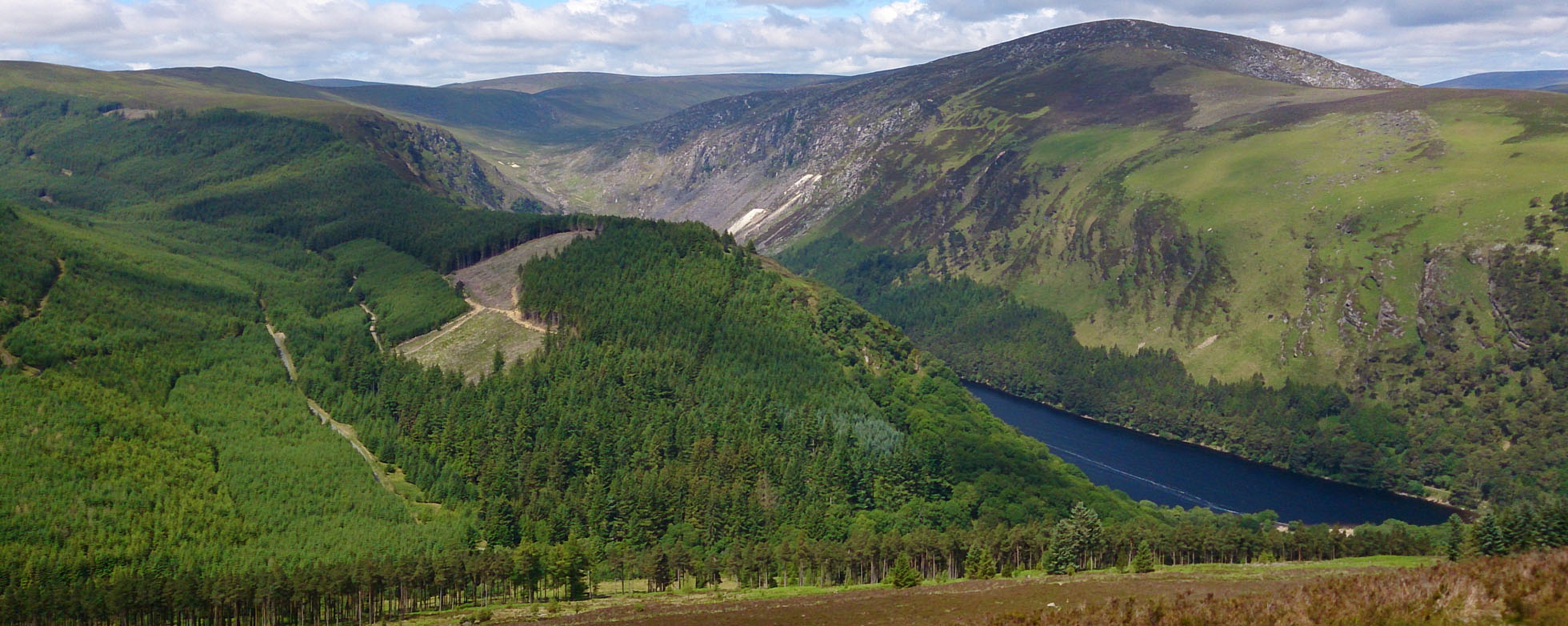
Upper Lake surrounded by Camaderry (right), Conavalla (distance centre), and Lugduff (far right), and The Spinc forested outcrop (near centre)

=== Church of Ireland succession ===
The Church of Ireland maintains the diocese of Glendalough in union with the diocese of Dublin- together being the Diocese of Dublin and Glendalough. As such, the Archbishop of Dublin is also styled as bishop of Glendalough.

=== Catholic succession ===
Since 1969, Glendalough has been a titular see in the Roman Catholic Church and is used for bishops who hold no ordinary power of their own, and thus are titular bishops.

==== Titular bishops ====
- Raymond D'Mello (20 December 1969 – 13 December 1973)
- Marian Przykucki (12 December 1973 – 15 June 1981)
- Donal Murray (4 March 1982 – 10 February 1996)
- Diarmuid Martin (5 December 1998 – 14 October 2004)
- Guy Sansaricq (6 June 2006 – 21 August, 2021)
- Kevin S. Randall (13 August 2023 – present)

== Annalistic references ==
See Annals of Inisfallen (AI)

- AI800.2 Minndenach, abbot of Glenn dá Locha, rested.
- AI809.2 Échtbrann, abbot of Glenn dá Locha, [rested].
- AI1003.6 Dúnchad Ua Mancháin, abbot of Glenn dá Locha, rested.

== Monuments in the Lower Glen ==
=== Gateway ===
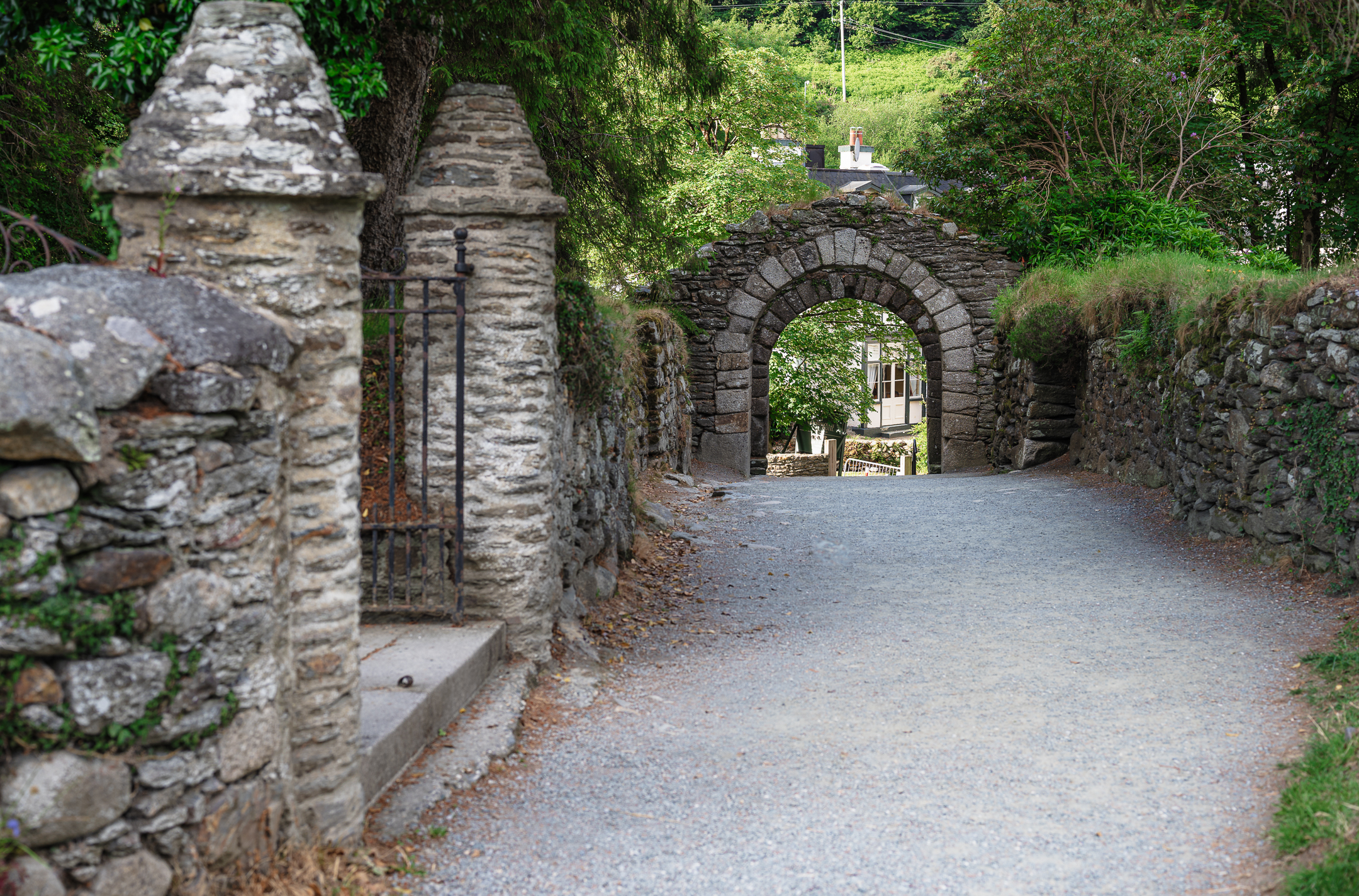
The Gateway

The Gateway to the monastic city of Glendalough is one of the most important monuments, now totally unique in Ireland. It was originally two-storeyed with two fine, granite arches. The antae or projecting walls at each end suggest that it had a timber roof. Inside the gateway, in the west wall, is a cross-inscribed stone. This denoted sanctuary, the boundary of the area of refuge. The paving of the causeway in the monastic city is still preserved in part but very little remains of the enclosure wall.

=== Round Tower ===
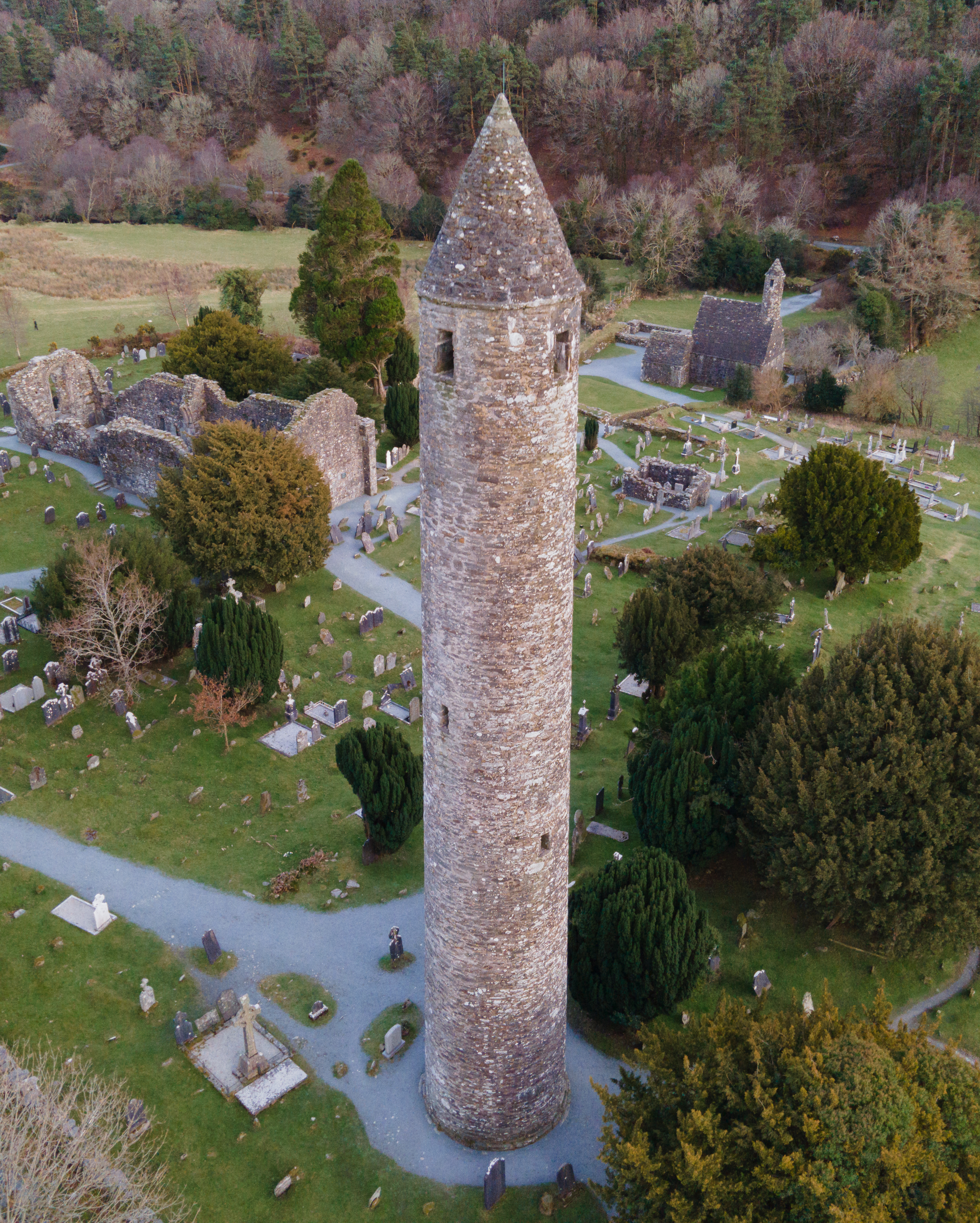
The Round Tower

This fine tower, built of mica-slate interspersed with granite is about 30 metres high, with an entrance 3.5 metres from the base. The conical roof was rebuilt in 1876 using the original stones. The tower originally had six timber floors, connected by ladders. The four storeys above entrance level are each lit by a small window; while the top storey has four windows facing the cardinal compass points. Round towers, landmarks for approaching visitors, were built as bell towers, but also served on occasion as store-houses and as places of refuge in times of attack.

=== St. Peter and St. Pauls' Cathedral ===
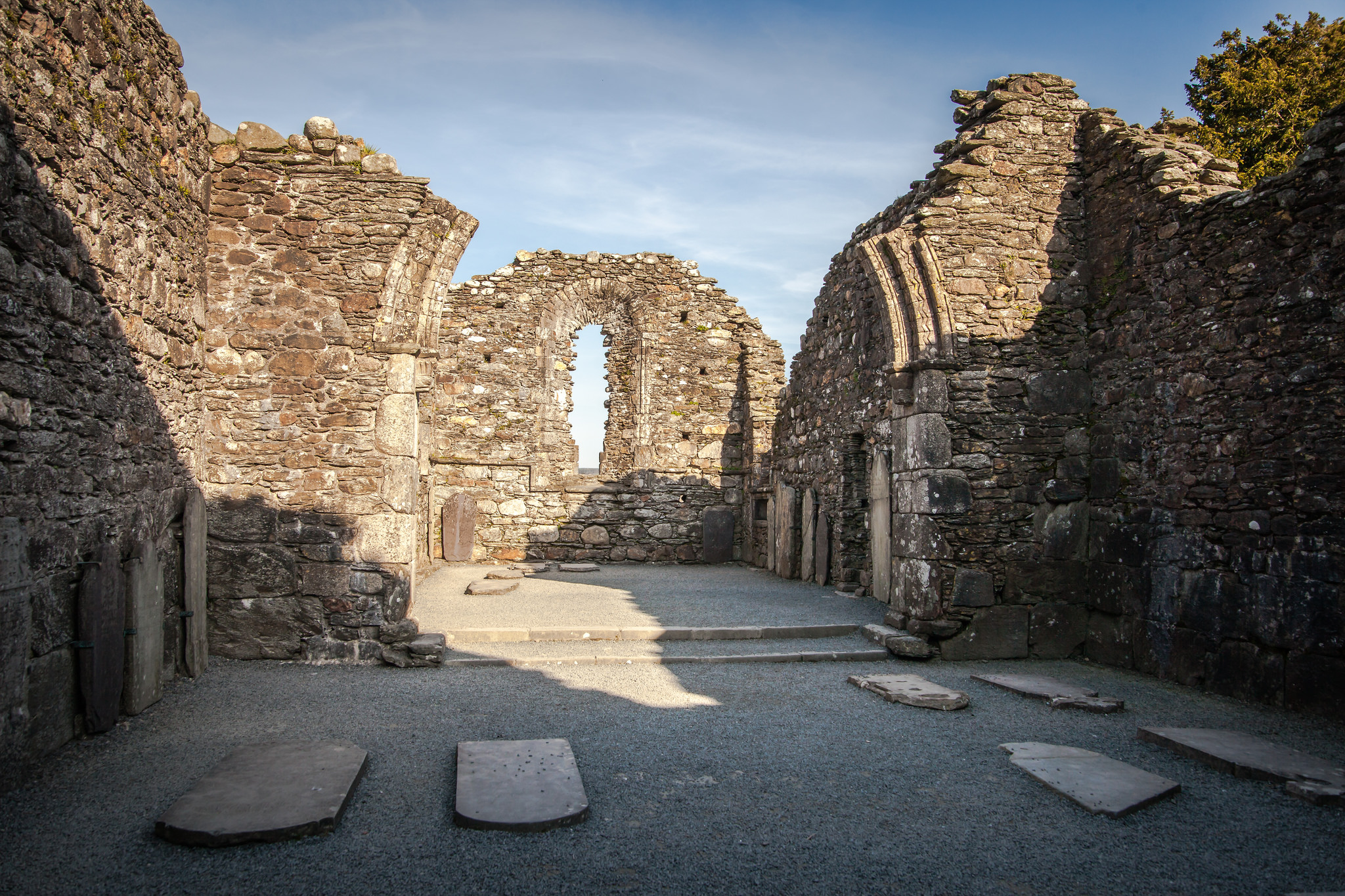
The Cathedral

St. Peter and St. Pauls' Cathedral is the largest and most imposing of the buildings at Glendalough, the cathedral had several phases of construction, the earliest, consisting of the present nave with its antae. The large mica-schist stones which can be seen up to the height of the square-headed west doorway were re-used from an earlier smaller church. The chancel and sacristy date from the late 12th and early 13th centuries. The chancel arch and east window were finely decorated, though many of the stones are now missing. The north doorway to the nave also dates from this period. Under the southern window of the chancel, there is an ambry or wall cupboard and a piscina, a basin used for washing the sacred vessels. A few metres south of the cathedral an early cross of local granite, with an unpierced ring, is commonly known as St. Kevin's Cross.

=== Priests' House ===
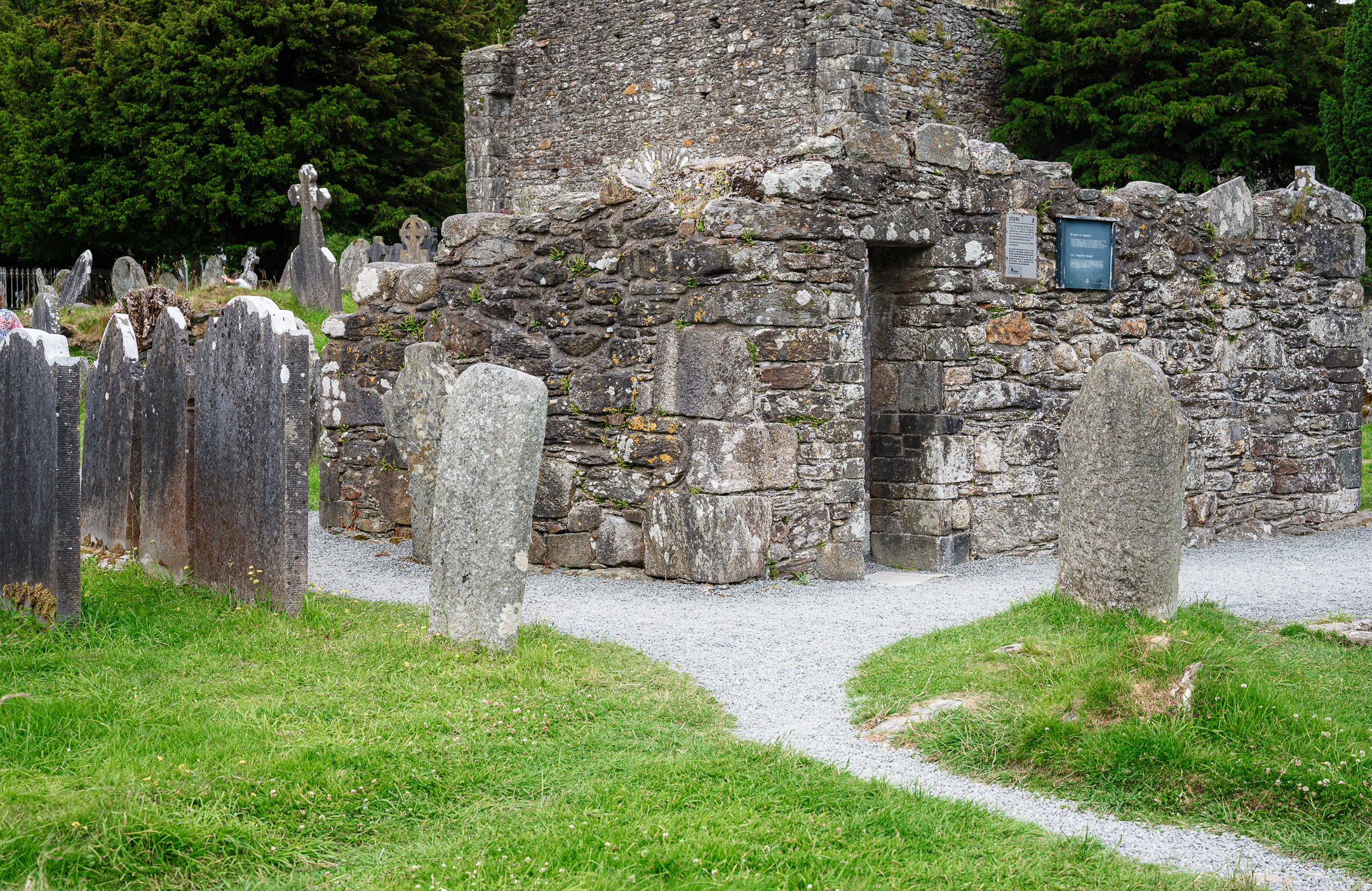
The Priests' House

Almost totally reconstructed from the original stones, based on a 1779 sketch made by Beranger, the Priests' House is a small Romanesque building, with a decorative arch at the east end. It gets its name from the practice of interring priests there in the 18th and 19th centuries. Its original purpose is unknown although it may have been used to house relics of St. Kevin.

=== St. Kevin's Church or "Kitchen" ===
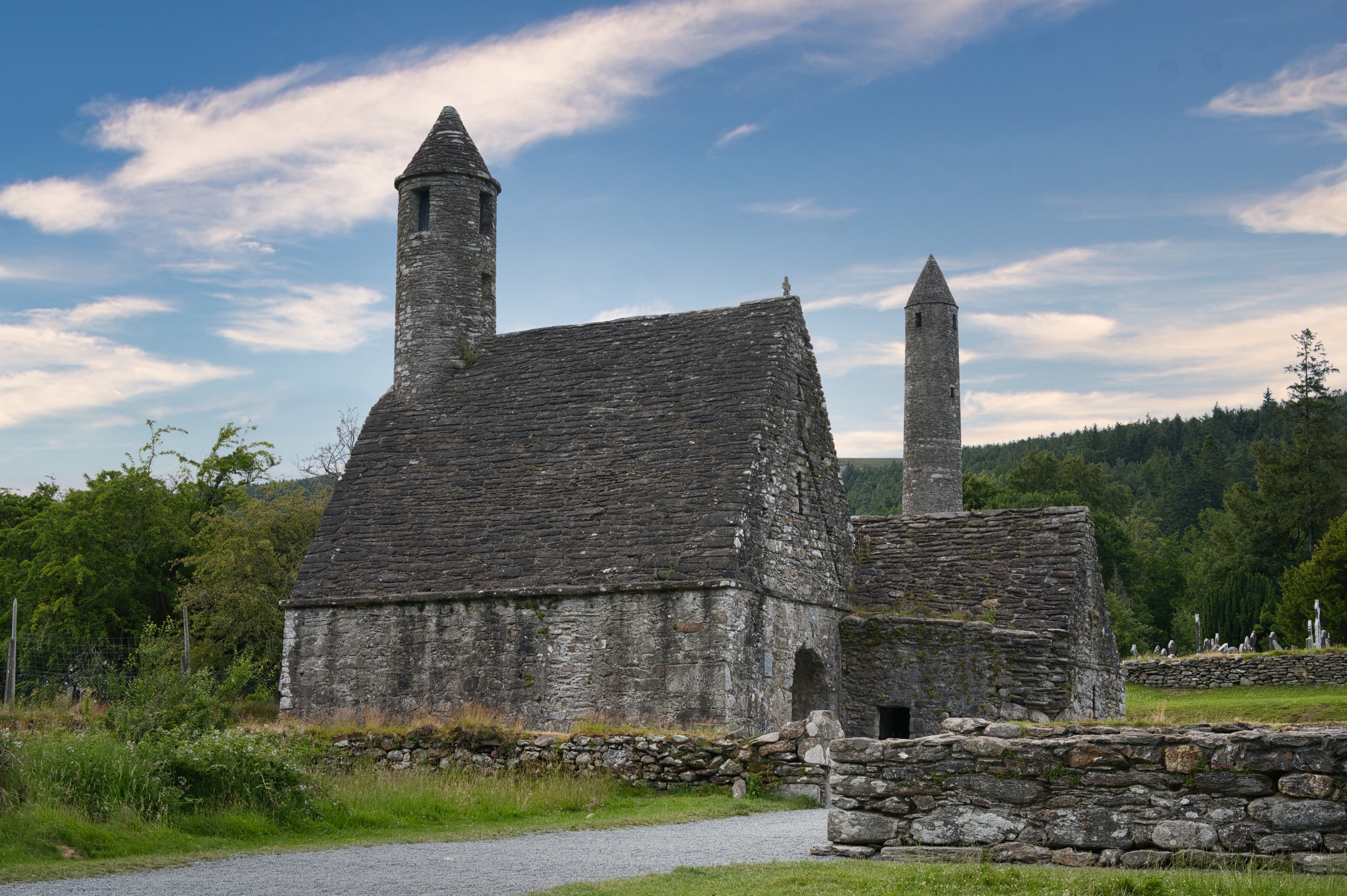
Saint Kevin's Church

This stone-roofed building originally had a nave only, with an entrance at the west end and a small round-headed window in the east gable. The upper part of the window can be seen above what became the chancel arch when the chancel (now missing) and the sacristy were added later. The steep roof, formed of overlapping stones, is supported internally by a semi-circular vault. Access to the croft or roof chamber was through a rectangular opening towards the western end of the vault. The church also had a timber first floor. The belfry with its conical cap and four small windows rises from the west end of the stone roof in the form of a miniature round tower. It is commonly known as St. Kevin's Kitchen as the bell tower resembles a kitchen chimney. However, food was not cooked here.

=== St. Ciarán's Church ===
The remains of this nave-and-chancel church were uncovered in 1875. The church is currently thought to commemorate St. Ciarán, the founder of Clonmacnoise, a monastic settlement that had associations with Glendalough during the 10th century.

=== St. Mary's or Our Lady's Church ===
One of the earliest and best constructed of the churches, St. Mary's or Our Lady's Church consists of a nave with a later chancel. Its granite west doorway with an architrave, has inclined jambs and a massive lintel. The underside of the lintel is inscribed with an unusual saltire or x-shaped cross. The east window is round-headed, with a hood moulding and two very worn carved heads on the outside.

=== Trinity Church ===
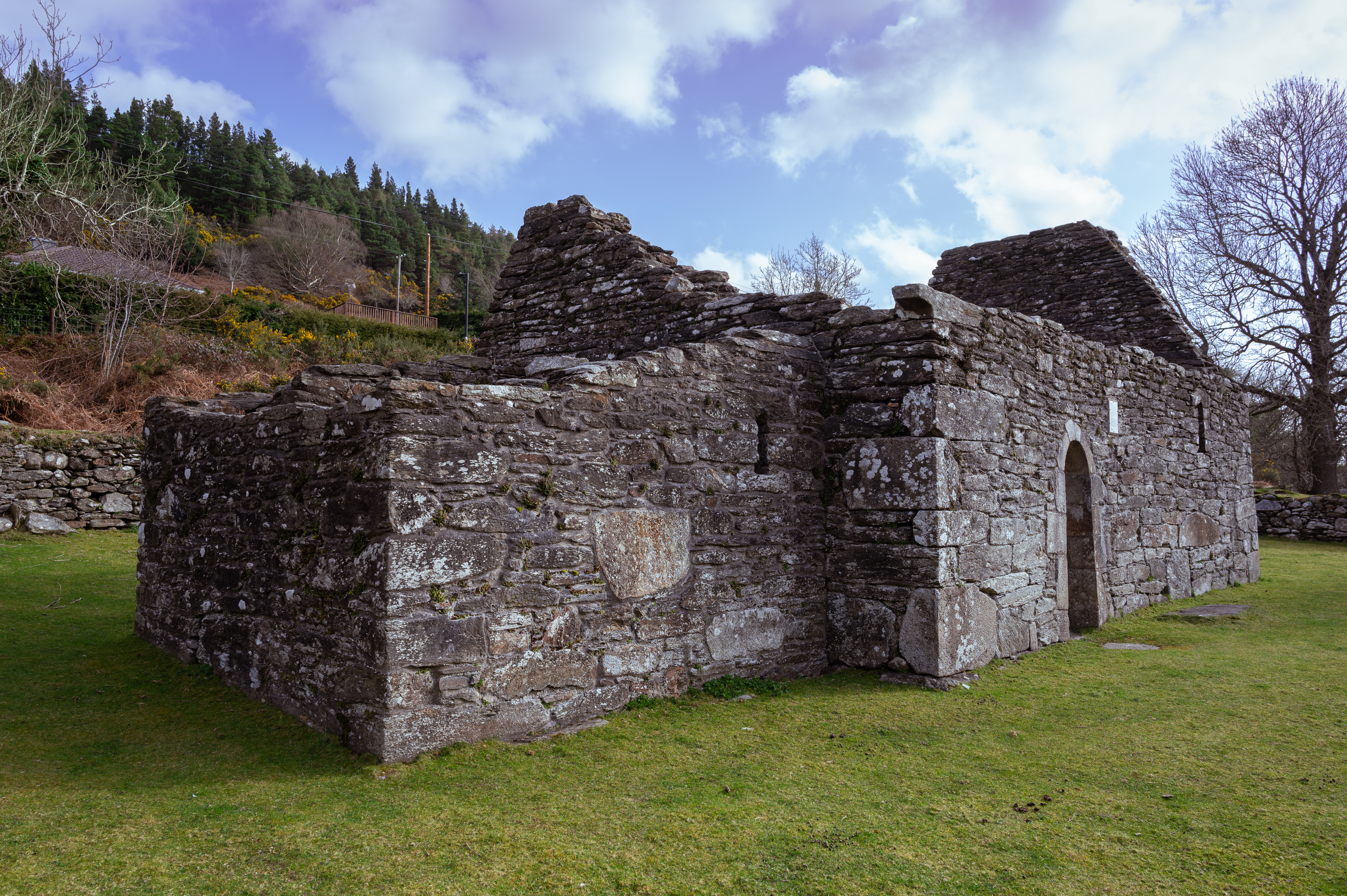
Trinity Church

A simple nave-and-chancel church, with a fine chancel arch. Trinity Church is beside the main road. A square-headed doorway in the west gable leads into a later annexe, possibly a sacristy. A round tower or belfry was constructed over a vault in this chamber. This fell in a storm in 1818. The doorway inserted in the south wall of the nave also dates from this period. Projecting corbels at the gables would have carried the verge timbers of the roof. It is a simple nave and chancel church with an addition to the west end of the 9 metre long by 5.5 metre wide nave.

=== St. Saviour's Church ===
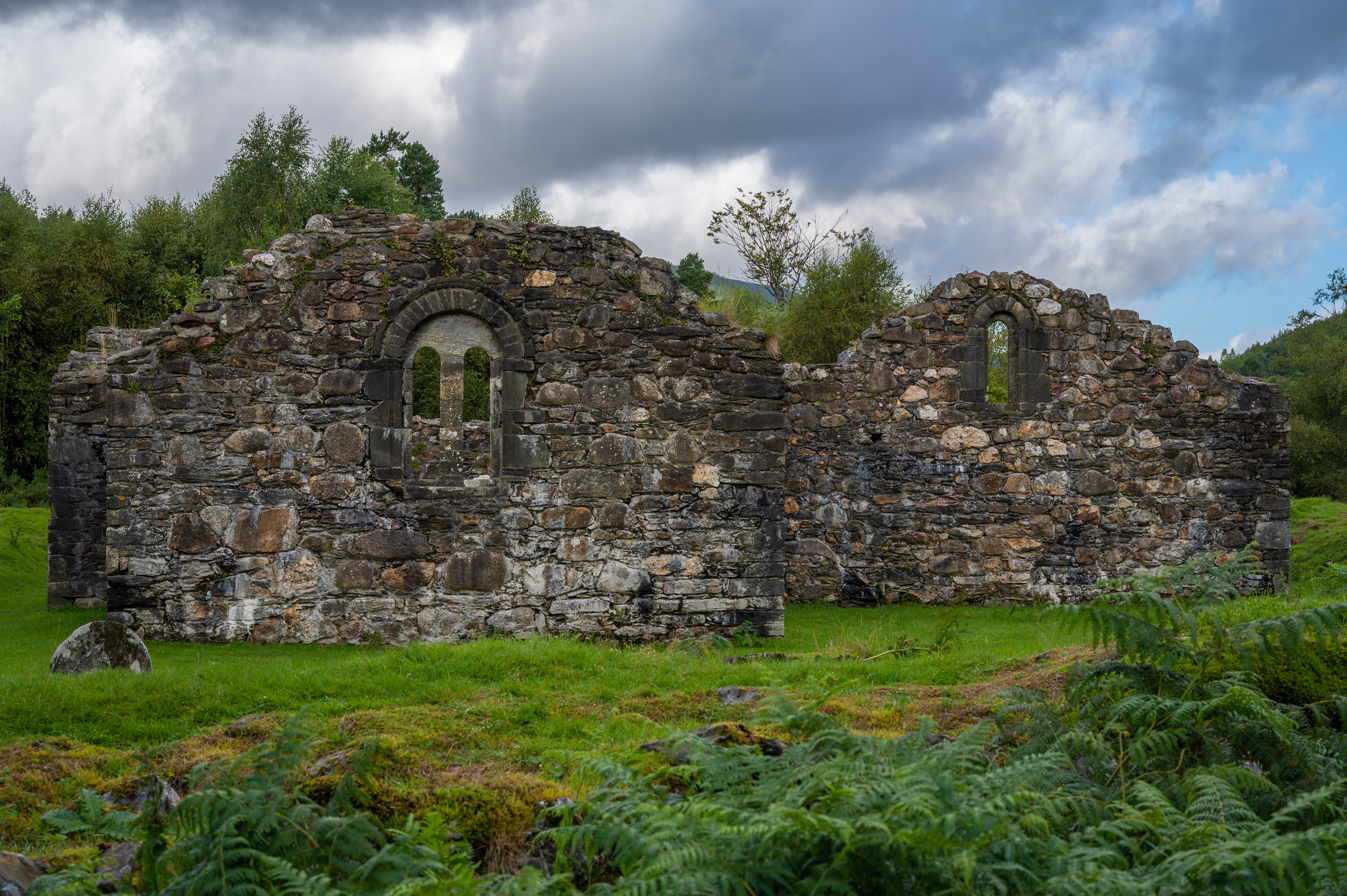
St. Saviour's Church

The most recent of the Glendalough churches, St. Saviour's priory was built in the 12th century, probably at the time of St. Laurence O'Toole. The nave and chancel with their fine decorate stones were restored in the 1870s using stones found on the site. The Romanesque chancel arch has three orders, with highly ornamented capitals. The east window has two round-headed lights. Its decorated features include a serpent, a lion, and two birds holding a human head between their beaks. A staircase in the eastern wall leading from an adjoining domestic building would have given access to a room over the chancel.

=== The Deer Stone ===
The Deer stone is a bullaun stone. It sits on the south side of the Glenealo River, directly opposite ruins of St Ciarán’s church, beside the green road leading to the upper lake. Their original use is largely unknown, their original use many of these stones over time developed associations with the saints and were part of the post medieval pilgrim rituals. In August 2023, The Deer Stone was vandalised, causing permanent damage.

== Monuments near the Upper Lough ==
=== Reefert Church ===
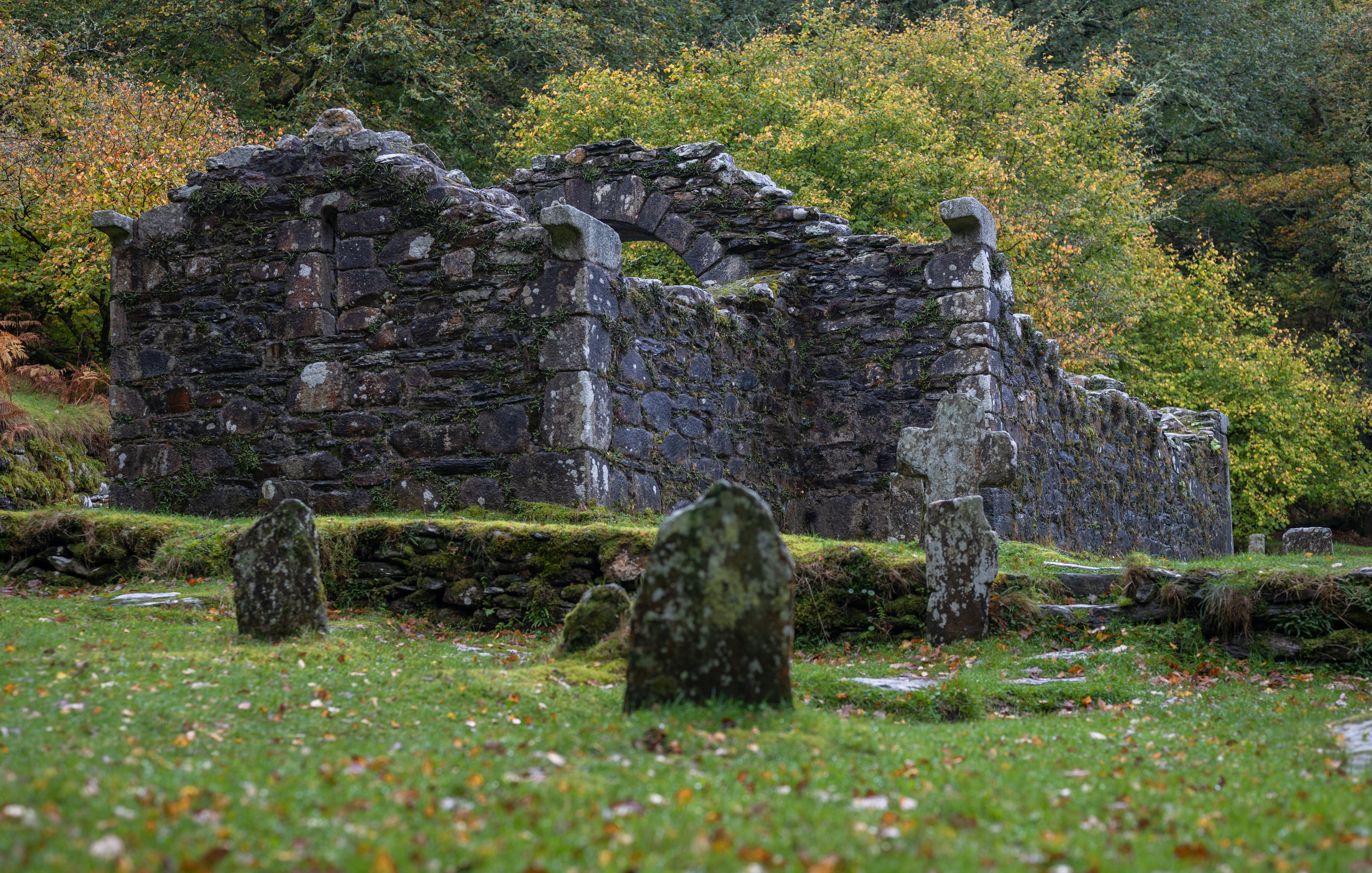
Reefert Church

Situated in a grove of trees, this nave-and-chancel church dates from around 1100. Most of the surrounding walls are modern. The name derives from Righ Fearta, the burial place of the kings. The church, built in a simple style, has a granite doorway with sloping jambs and flat lintel and a granite chancel arch. The projecting corbels at each gable carried verge timbers for the roof. East of the church there are two crosses of note, one with an elaborate interlace pattern. On the other side of the Poulanass River, close to Reefert are the remains of another small church.

=== St. Kevin's Cell ===
Built on a rocky spur over the lake, this stone structure was 3.6 metres in diameter with walls 0.9 metres thick and a doorway on the east side. Only the foundations survive today and it is possible that the cell had a stone-corbelled roof, similar to the beehive huts on Skellig Michael, County Kerry.

=== St. Kevin's Bed ===
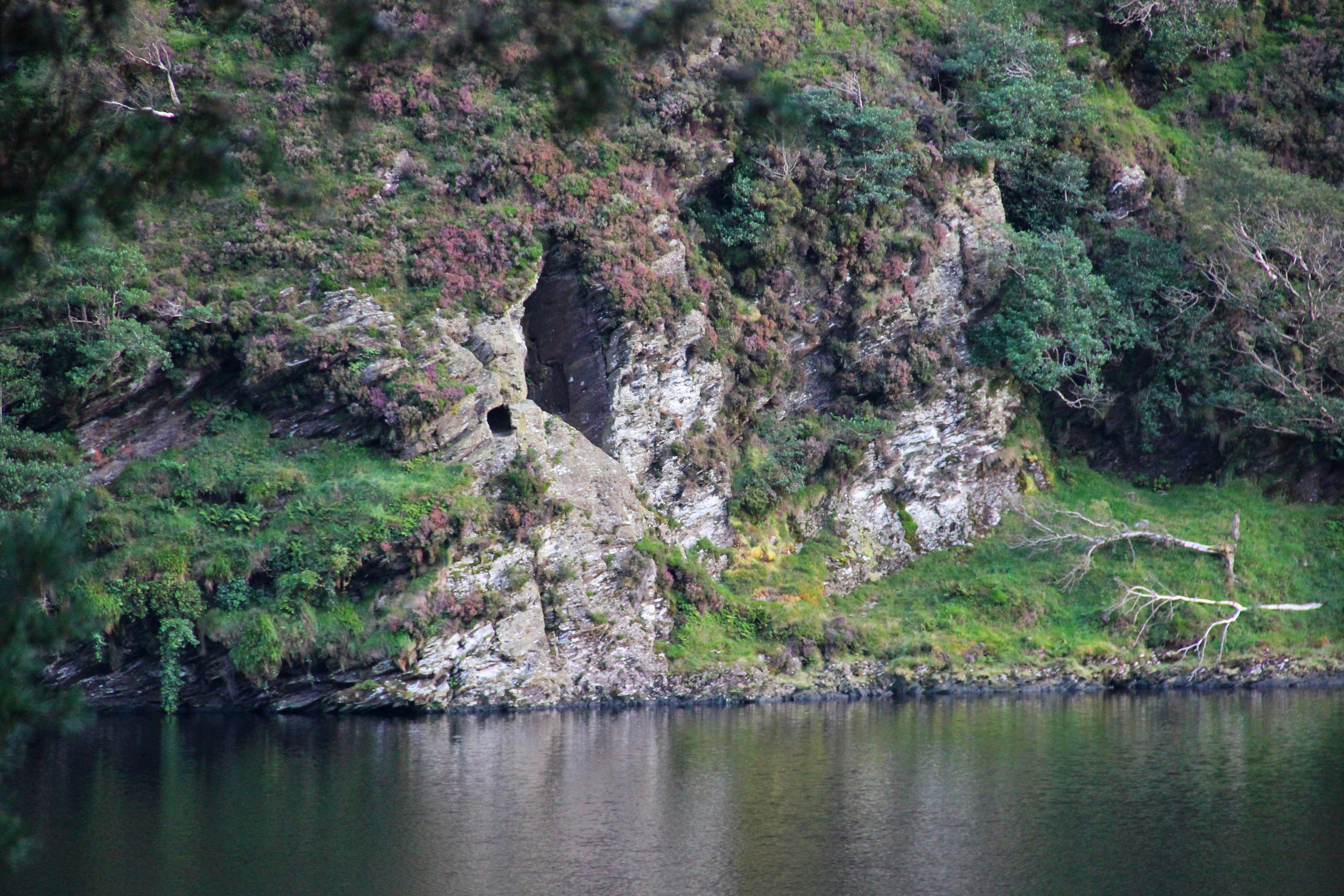
St. Kevin's Bed

St. Kevin's Bed is a cave in the rock face about 8 metres above the level of the Upper Lake on its southerly side (with The Spinc cliffs above it). It was reputedly a retreat for St. Kevin and later for St. Laurence O'Toole. Partly man-made, it runs back 2 metres into the rock. A writer for the Dublin Penny Journal described the cave as "not bigger than a small baker's oven... I, and two young men who followed me, found it a very tight fit when crouched together in it".

=== The "Caher" ===
This stone-walled circular enclosure on the level ground between the two lakes is 20 metres in diameter and is of unknown date. Close by, are several crosses, apparently used as stations on the pilgrim's route.

=== Temple-na-Skellig ===
This small rectangular church on the southern shore of the Upper Lake is accessible only by boat, via a series of steps from the landing stage. West of the church is a raised platform with stone enclosure walls, where dwelling huts probably stood. The church, partly rebuilt in the 12th century, has a granite doorway with inclined jambs. At the east gable is an inscribed Latin Cross together with several plain grave slabs and three small crosses.

== Miner's Village ==
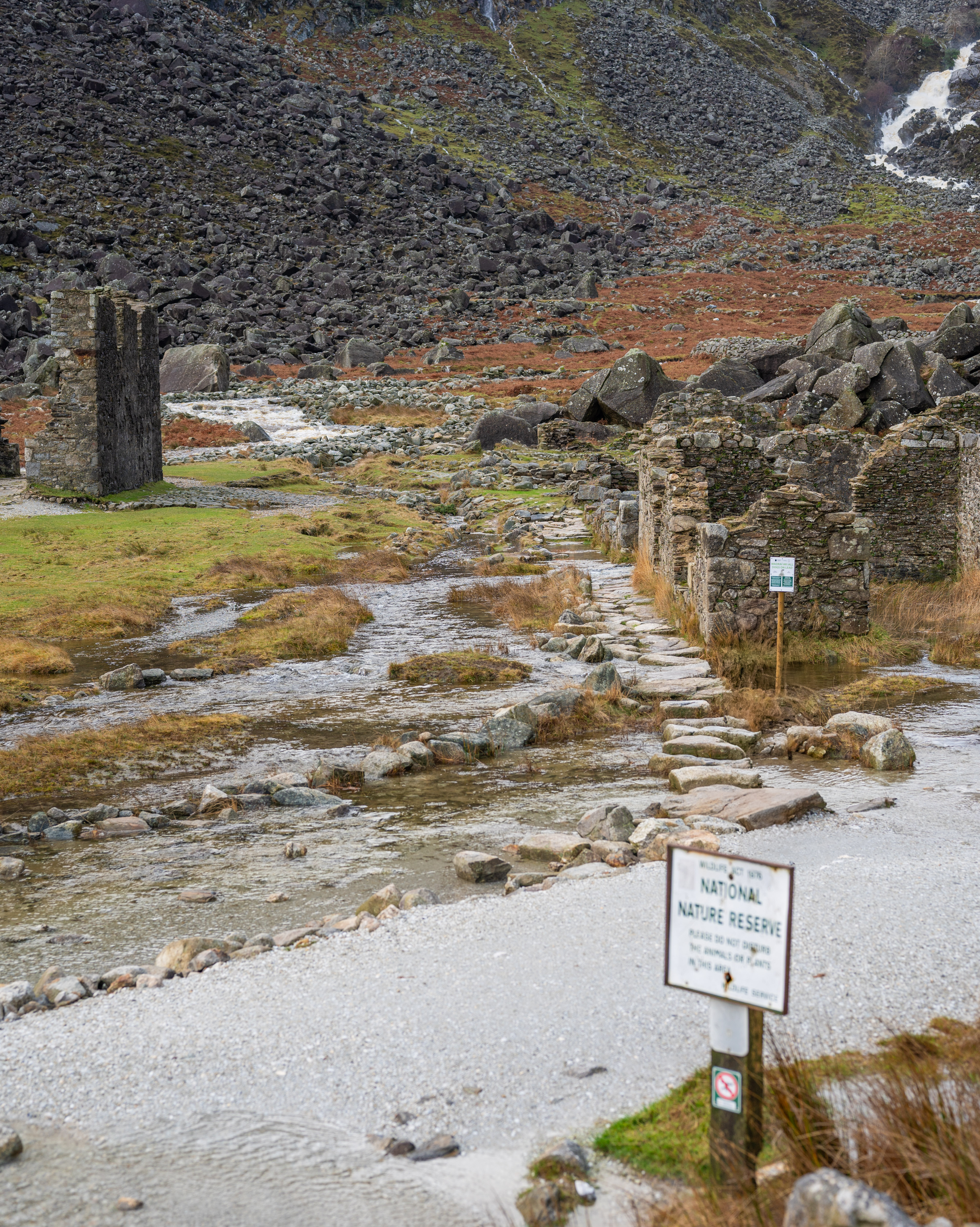
Miner's Village

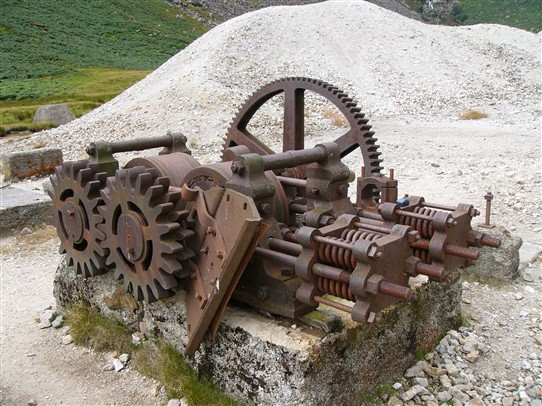
Ore Crusher

Camaderry Mountain 699 metres (2,293 ft) which overlooks the upper Glendalough Lake from the north shore, contains the Luganure mineral vein which is a source of lead in the form of galena (PbS), and also contains traces of silver. While the main Camaderry mines were in the neighbouring Glendasan Valley, a second Miner's Village and processing facilities were constructed at the head of the Glendalough valley, which was nick-named Van Diemen's Land by the miners.

In 1859, the Glendasan and Glendalough mines were connected with each other by a series of tunnels called adits, which are now mostly flooded, through the Camaderry mountain. These tunnels helped drain the mineral vein and made it easier to transport ore to Glendalough where it could be more easily processed. The rusted remains of ore crushers can still be seen at the Miner's Village, however, the tramway and inclined rails system are gone.

In 1809, Thomas Weaver established the 'Glendalough Mining Company' in partnership with local investors. Weaver had previously been involved with mapping the geology of Wicklow, after the Wicklow gold rush of 1795, 14 years prior. In 1825, the Glendalough Mining Company took over the Glendasan mines when they bought Weaver's shares.

Mining in Glendalough/Glendasan took place in three phases. The first phase was from 1825 to 1890 by the Mining Company of Ireland. A second phase took place between 1890 and 1925 by the local Wynne family. The mines were re-opened briefly from 1948 to 1957 after which mining ceased completely.

== Nature ==
=== Geography ===
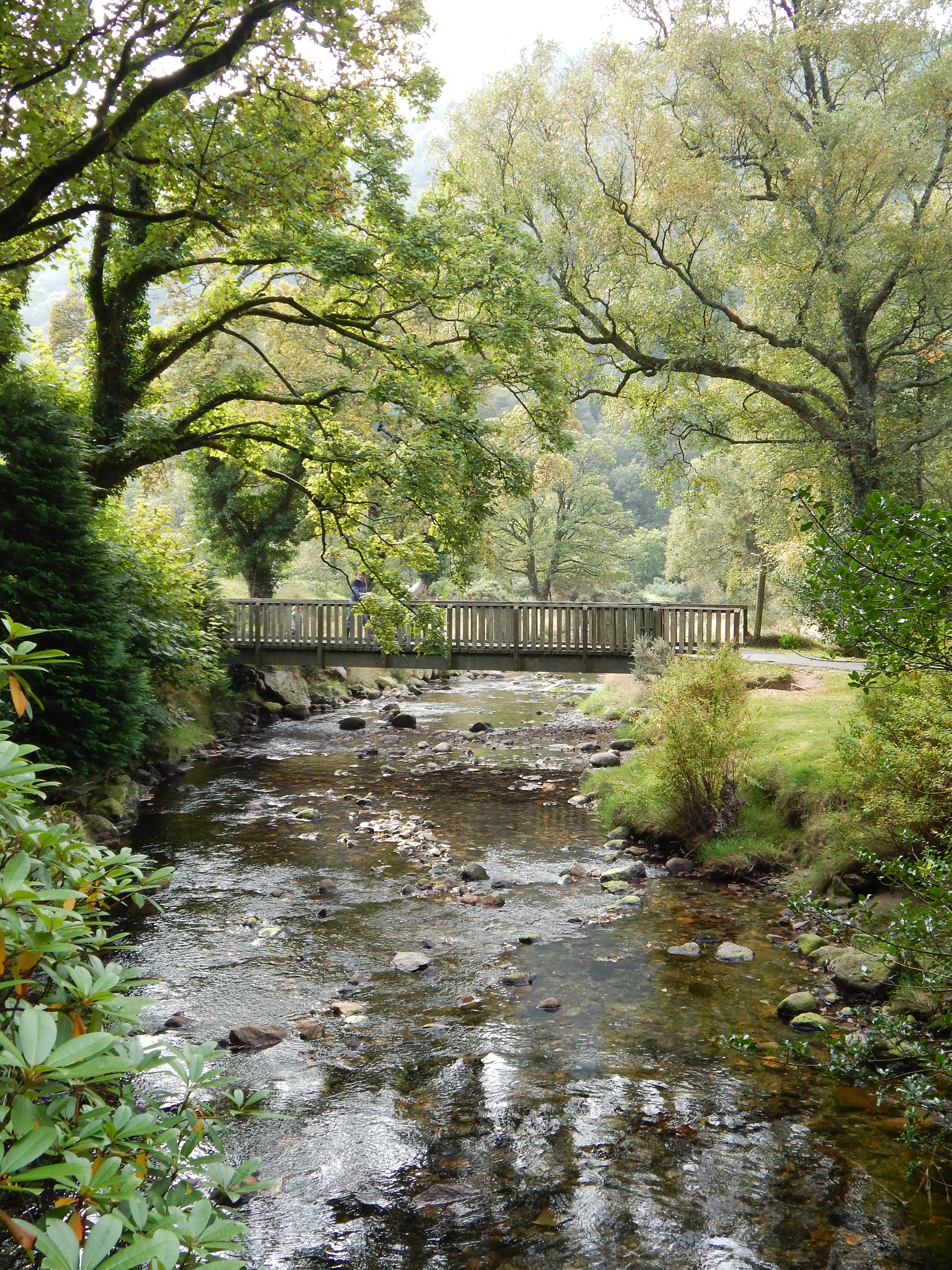
Poulanass River

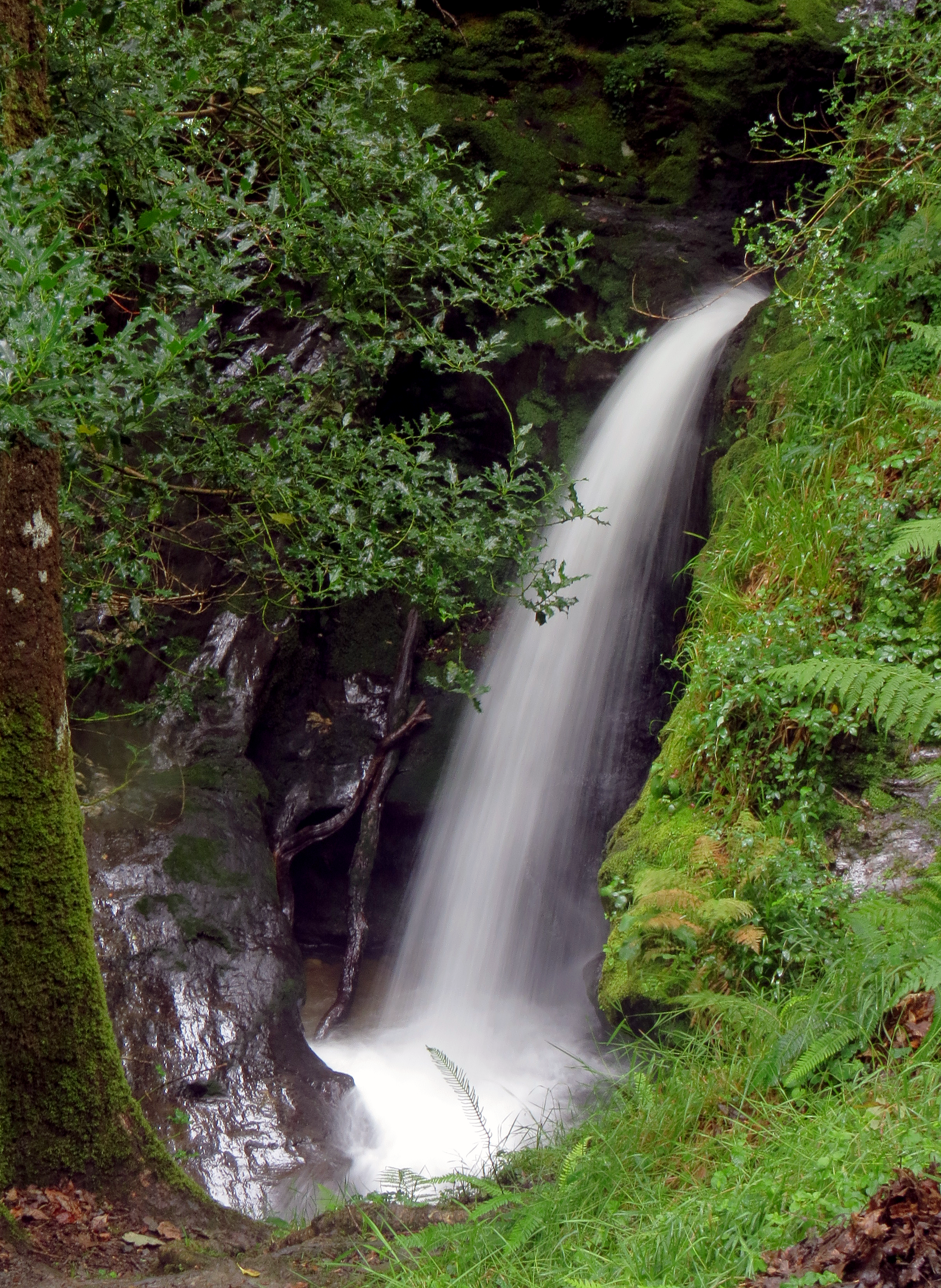
Poulanass Waterfall

The valley of Glendalough was formed during the last ice age by a glacier which left a moraine across the valley mouth. The Poulanass River, which plunges into the valley from the south, via the Poulanass Waterfall, created a delta, which eventually divided the original lake in two. Surrounding Glendalough are the mountains of Camaderry 699 metres (2,293 ft), the hydroelectric station at Turlough Hill 681 metres (2,234 ft), and large massif of Conavalla 734 metres (2,408 ft) which dominates the head of the valley, and the peaks of Lugduff 652 metres (2,139 ft), and Mullacor 661 metres (2,169 ft).

=== Vegetation ===
Glendalough is surrounded by semi-natural oak woodland. Much of this was formerly coppiced (cut to the base at regular intervals) to produce wood, charcoal and bark. In the springtime, the oakwood floor is carpeted with a display of bluebells, wood sorrel and wood anemones. Other common plants are woodrush, bracken, polypody fern and various species of mosses. The understorey is largely of holly, hazel and mountain ash.

=== Wildlife ===
Glendalough is a good place to look for some of Ireland's newest breeding species, such as the goosander and the great spotted woodpecker, and some of the rarest, such as the common redstart and the wood warbler; peregrine, white-throated dipper, common cuckoo, eurasian jay and common buzzard can also be seen.

== Recreation ==
=== Walking trails ===
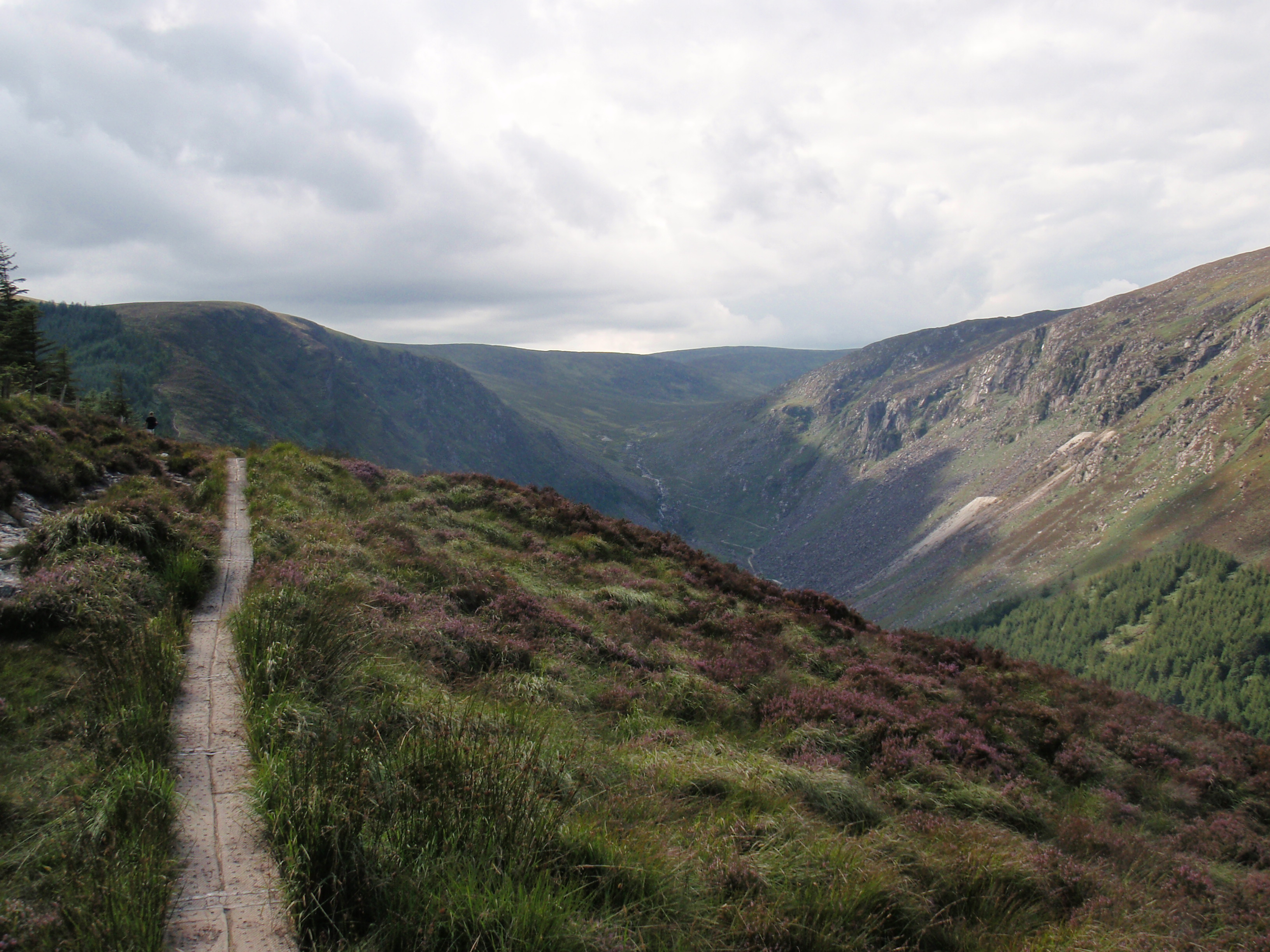
View west, White Route boardwalk

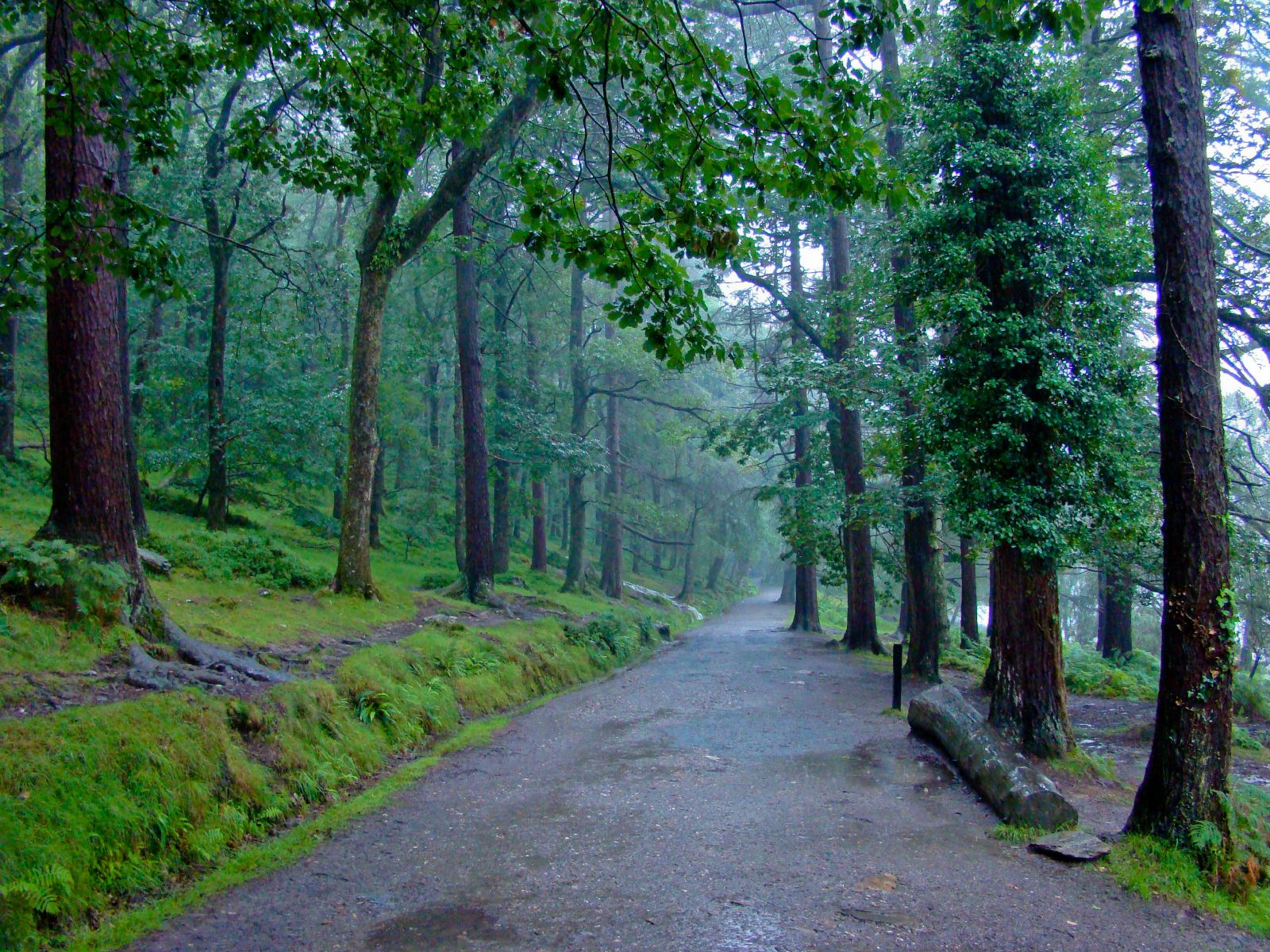
View east, Miner's Road Walk

There are nine way-marked trails of varying difficulty around Glendalough that are maintained by the Wicklow Mountains National Park (and who provide a map of all trails). Some of the trails stay on mostly flat-ground pathways around the two lakes of Glendalough (The Miner's Road Walk, Green Road Walk), others lead up the Poolanass Waterfall area with options beyond into a network of forest paths (e.g. Derrybawn Woodland Trail). The most notable trails used to take the steep 600–step boarded path (using railway sleepers), but replaced by a zig-zag path in 2020 from the Poolanass Waterfall up to vantage platform of The Spinc (from the Irish "An Spinc"; meaning "pointed hill"), which overlooks the upper lake and the Glendalough valley below.

The most noted Spinc trail is the White Route which follows a further scenic boarded path westwards along the cliffs of the upper lake to the Glenealo Valley (home to herds of red deer), and down on stone paths to the Miner's Village, and back along the Miner's Road on the north shore of the upper lake, to finish at the upper lake car park, (off the R757). As the entire White Route loop is on paths (either stone/sand paths or boarded railway sleepers), it can be completed in running shoes and does not require climbing footwear; the entire 9-kilometre loop of the White Route, starting and ending at the upper lake car-park, takes circa 2–3 hours.

The Wicklow Way, a long distance waymarked walking trail, also passes through Glendalough.

The 30-kilometre medieval pilgrimage tail, Saint Kevin's Way, starts in Hollywood, and ends in Glendalough.

=== Rock climbing ===
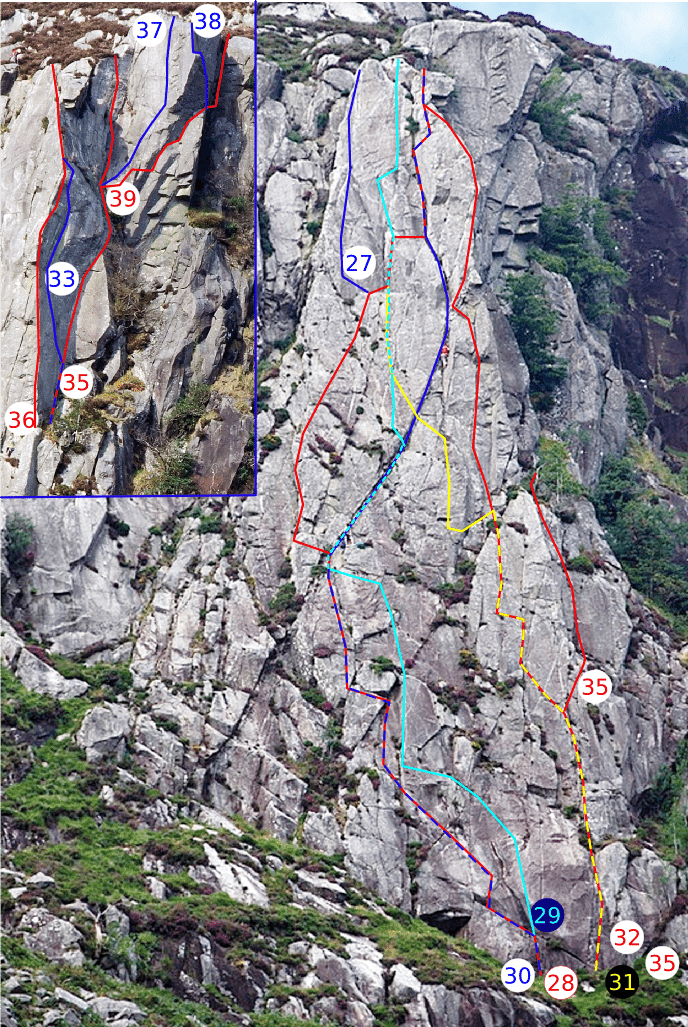
Marked climbs on the Main Face

Glendalough's south-facing granite cliffs, situated on slopes of Camaderry above the north-western end of the valley (just above the Miner's Village), have been a rock climbing location since 1948. The north-facing cliffs on the other side of the upper lake are not considered suitable for rock-climbing.

The 2009 Mountaineering Ireland climbing guidebook for Wicklow, as well as the online guidebooks for Glendalough, list about 144 routes at all grades up to E5 6b (Bathsheba and The Wake); the cliffs are particularly noted for their long, and multi-pitch, VS/HVS routes.

The climbs vary between one and four pitches, and up to over 100 metres in length. There are several sectors:

- Twin Buttress, lying at the far western end of the cliffs overlooking the Miner's Village, is a large buttress divided by a seasonal waterfall (which itself is often split into two streams), with the most popular climbs split over West Buttress, Expectancy Slab and Main Face.
- The Upper Cliffs, a band of cliffs high up on the hillside east of Twin Buttress.
- Acorn Buttress, a small buttress just below Twin Buttress, which is a popular base-camp location.
- Hobnail Buttress, a small buttress with some easy climbing, on the hillside one kilometre to the east.

The Irish Mountaineering Club has operated a climbing hut since the 1950s.

Below the crag is an extensive boulder field which is also used for bouldering activities.

== Gallery ==
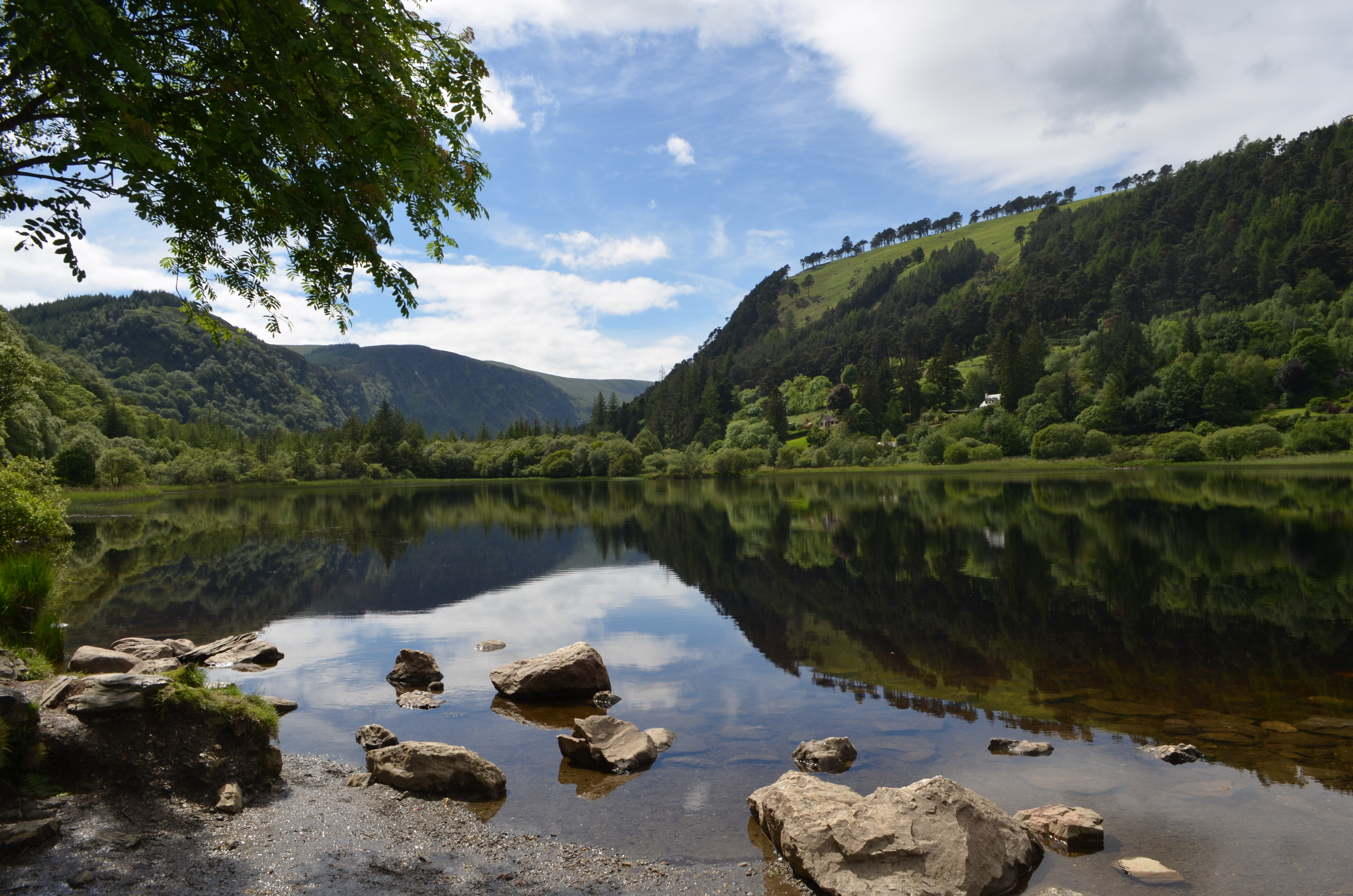
Lower Lake

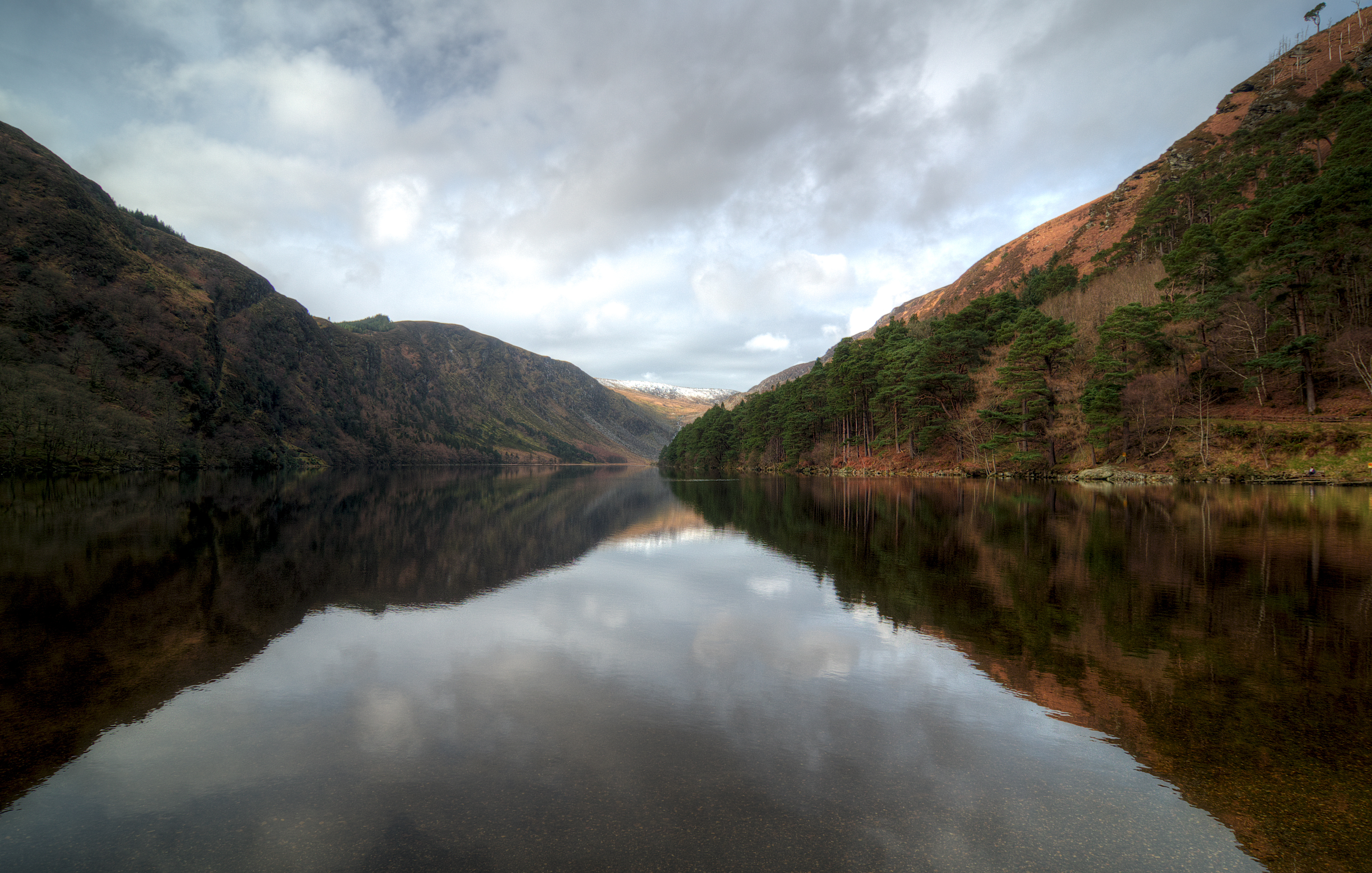
Higher Lake

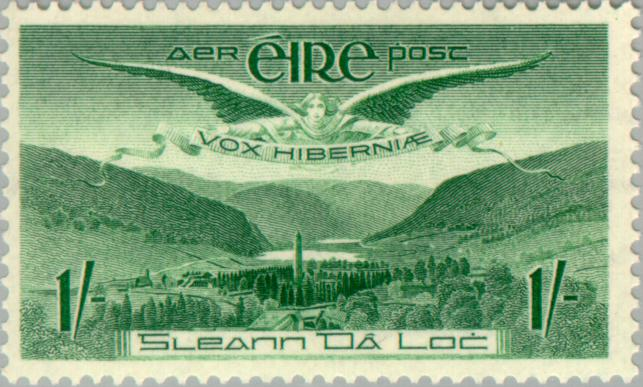
One shilling Irish stamp with Vox Hiberniae flying over Gleann Dá Loċ (1949)

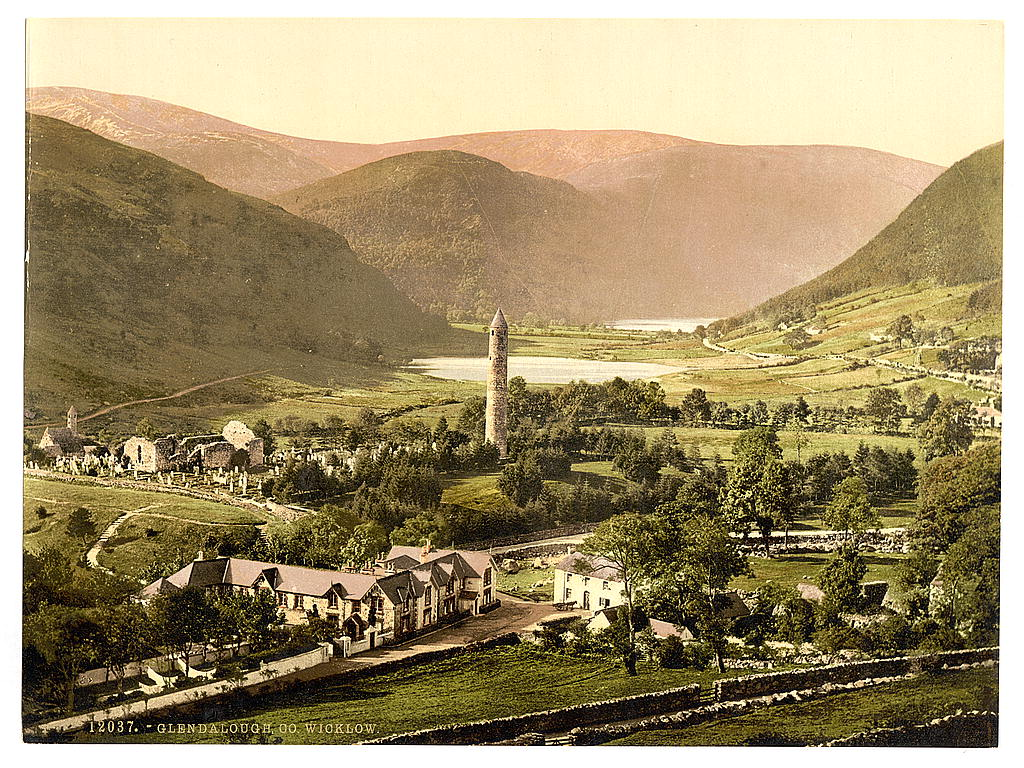
Glendalough (1890s)

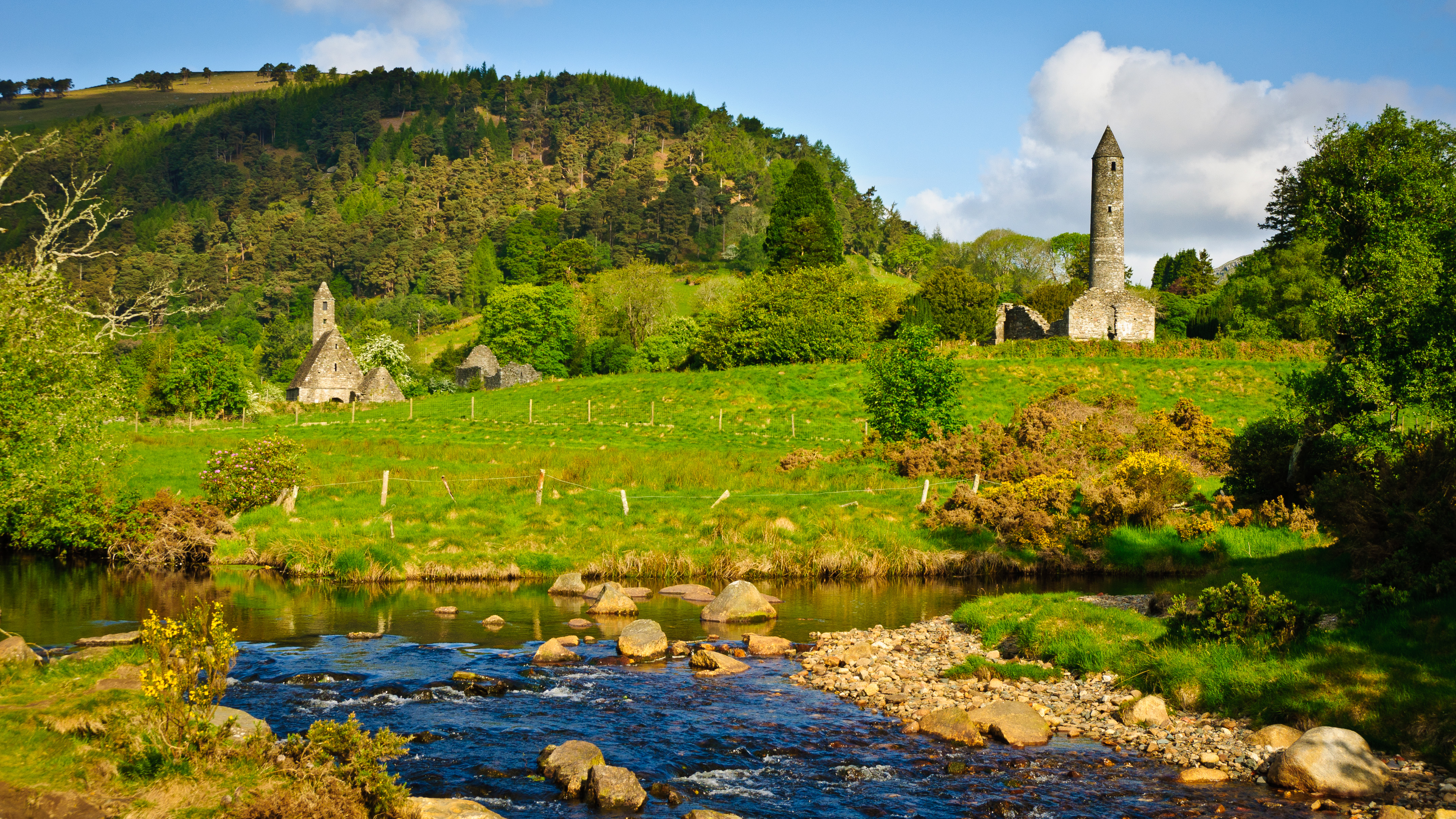
Glendalough (2011)

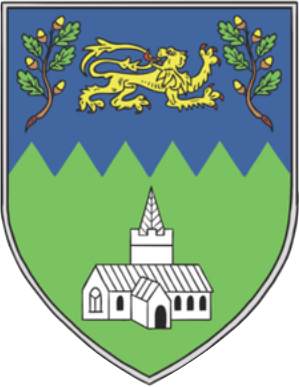
St. Kevin's Church on the coat of arms of County Wicklow

== See also ==
- Abbot of Glendalough
- Bishop of Glendalough
- Irish round tower
- Saint Kevin
- List of abbeys and priories in County Wicklow
