= Glendalough Upper Lake =

Lake in Wicklow, Ireland

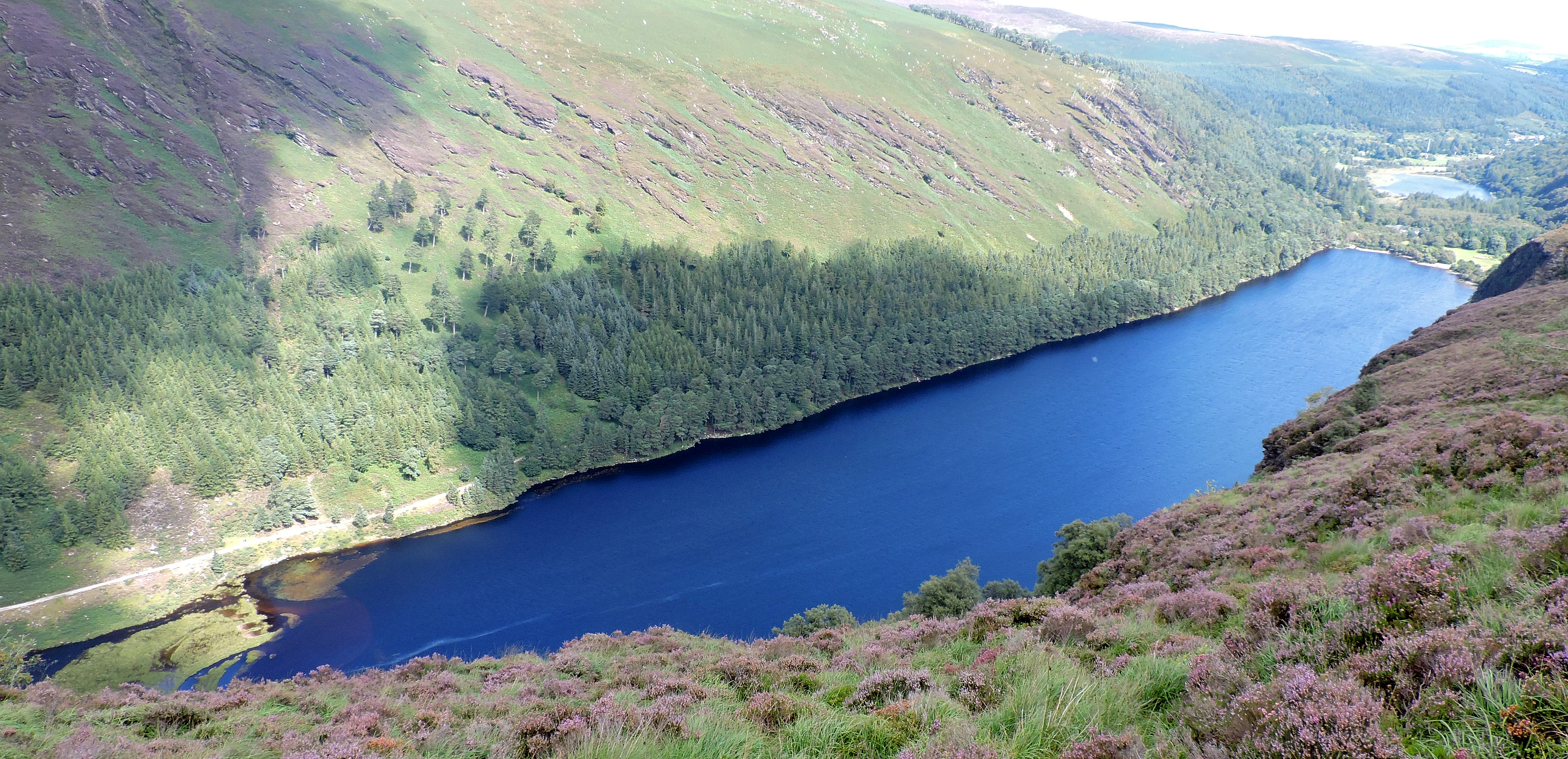
- Overall view

- Location in Ireland
- Location: County Wicklow
- Coordinates: 53°00′10″N 6°21′57″W
- Type: Glacial lake
- Primary inflows: Glenealo river, Lugduff Brook
- Primary outflows: Glenealo river
- Basin countries: Ireland
- Max. length: 2.8 km (1.7 mi)
- Max. width: 0.52 km (0.32 mi)
- Max. depth: 30 m (98 ft)
- Surface elevation: 440 ft (130 m)
- Islands: no

Glendalough Upper Lake (Irish: An Loch Uachtair) is a glacial lake near Glendalough, County Wicklow, Ireland.

== Geography ==
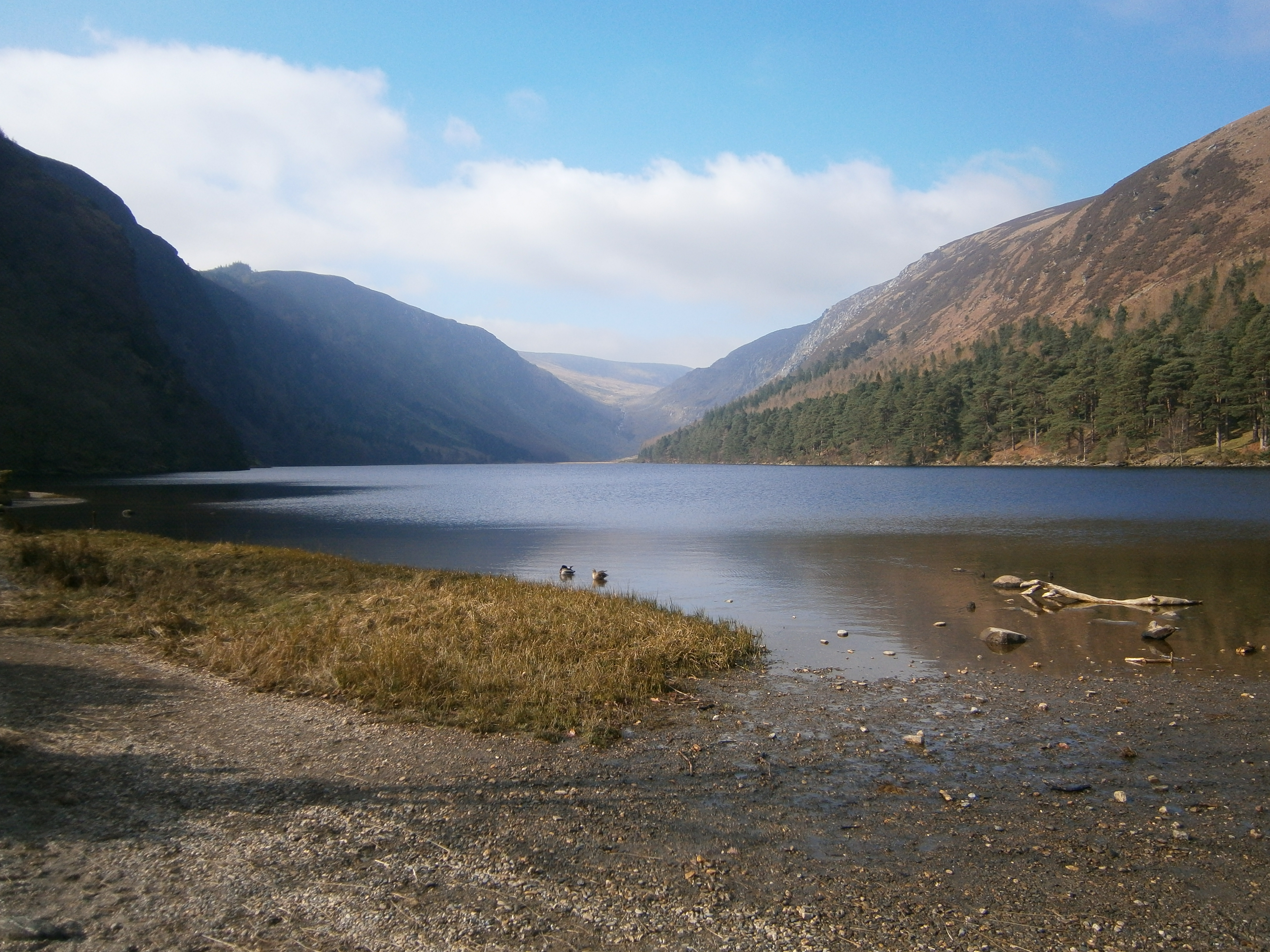
Eastern shore of the lake

The lake is located in the Wicklow Mountains area west of Glendalough Early Medieval monastic settlement. Near the southern shore stands a small rectangular church named Temple-na-Skellig, only accessible by boat and a series of steps from the landing stage; a nearby cliff hosts a cave called St. Kevin's bed, reputedly a retreat for St. Kevin and later for St. Laurence O'Toole.

== Geology ==
The lake is classified as a ribbon lake. The Upper and the Lower lake were at first united but one of their inflow brought an amount of sediment large enough to divide the original lake in two parts.

== Hiking ==
Close to the eastern tip of the lake passes the Wicklow Way, a long distance waymarked walking trail, on its way from Rathfarnham in the north to its southerly point of Clonegal.

== Nature conservation ==
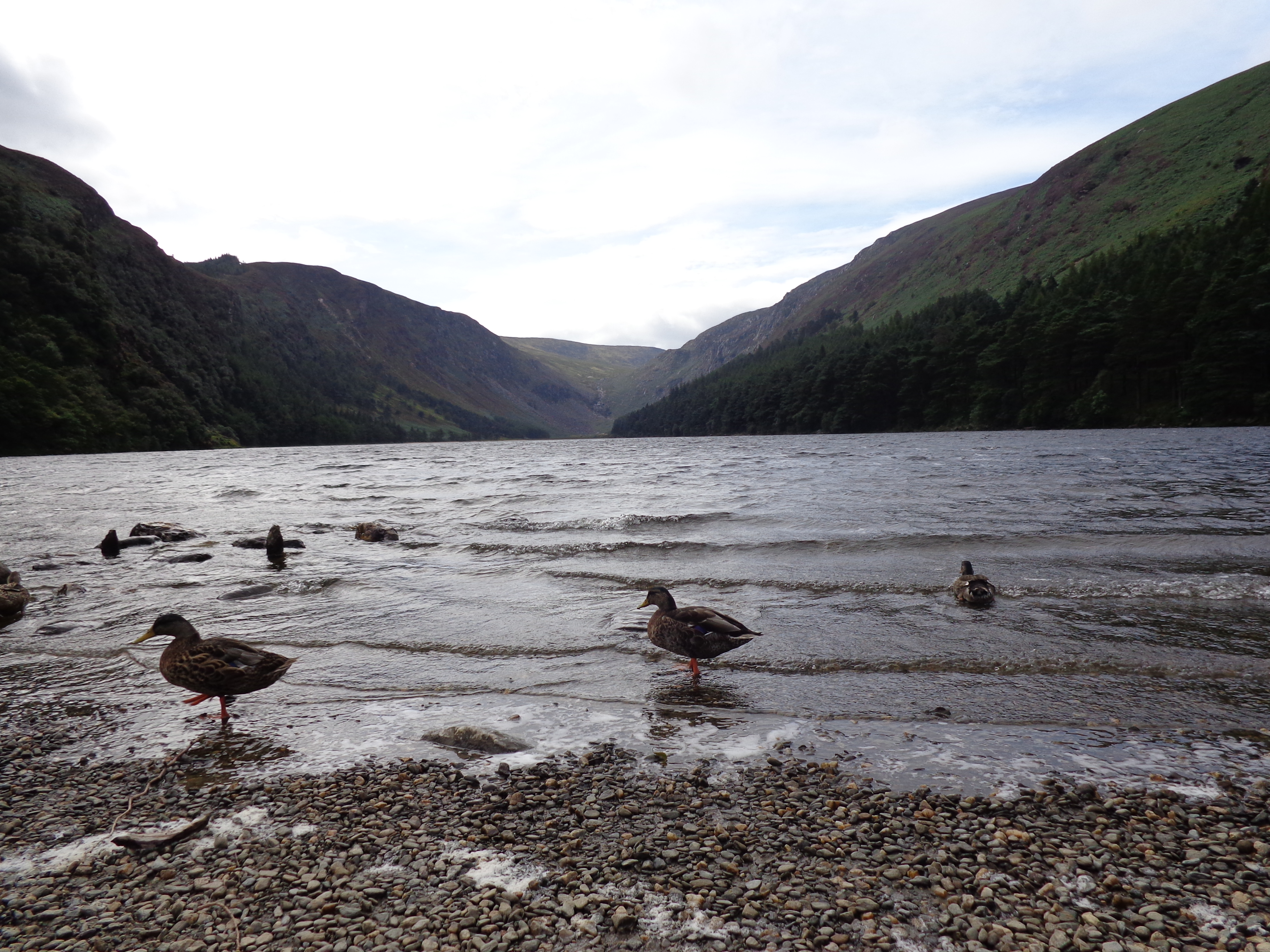
Ducks on the lake shore

The Upper Lake is part of the Wicklow Mountains National Park. Among the plants living near the coast can be cited the white waterlily and the broad-leaved pondweed. Some of its shore is occupied by a marsh with horsetail, bottle sedge and common reed, which is a convenient place to spot dragonflies.

== See also ==
- List of loughs in Ireland
