= Kevin of Glendalough =

Irish saint

Saint Kevin of Glendalough
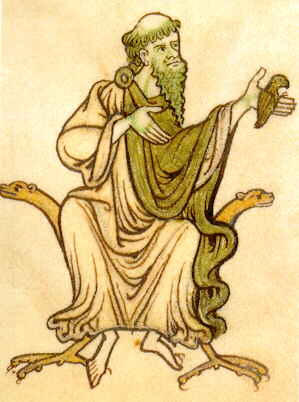
- St Kevin and the Blackbird, reputed to have nested in his hand
- Born: 498 (reputedly); Leinster
- Died: 3 June 618
- Venerated in: Catholic Church; Eastern Orthodox Church
- Canonized: 19 June 1902 (cultus confirmed on the Roman Catholic Church) by Leo XIII
- Major shrine: St. Kevin's Cell, St. Kevin's Bed, St. Kevin's Church
- Feast: 3 June
- Attributes: blackbird
- Patronage: blackbirds, Archdiocese of Dublin, Glendalough, Kilnamanagh

Saint Kevin of Glendalough (Modern Irish: Caoimhín; Old Irish: Cóemgen, Caemgen; Latinized Coemgenus) (ca. 498 – 3 June 618) is an Irish saint, known as the founder and first abbot of Glendalough in County Wicklow, Ireland. His Roman Catholic feast day is June 3rd.

== Early life ==
Saint Kevin's life is not well documented because no contemporaneous material survives.

There is a late-medieval Latin Vita, preserved among the records of the Franciscan Convent in Dublin, edited by John Colgan that exists as part of the Acta Sanctorum Hiberniae. According to that account, Saint Kevin (like Columba) was of noble birth, the son of Coemlog and Coemell of Leinster. It says he was born in 498 AD at the Fort of the White Fountain, and baptized by Cronan of Roscrea. His given name Coemgen (anglicized Kevin) means "fair-begotten", or "of noble birth". A tradition cited in the 17th century makes Kevin the pupil of Petroc of Cornwall, who had come to Leinster about 492. That claim is not found in the extant late-medieval and early-modern hagiography of the saint, and appears to be based in a Vita breviora which the Bollandist editors obtained from Henry Fitzsimon, but which is no longer extant.

The Vita also contains a number of legends which, according to Colgan's co-editor Francis Baert, are of "doubtful veracity", but were kept in the 17th-century edition because they were assumed to date to the medieval period. For example, the text includes an infancy legend involving a white cow, said to have come to his parents' house every morning and evening, which supplied the milk for the baby.

== Glendalough ==
Glendalough, or the Glen of Two Lakes, is one of the most important sites of monastic ruins in Ireland. Before the arrival of Kevin, this glen would have been lonely and remote and would have been ideal for a secluded retreat.

=== Hermitage ===
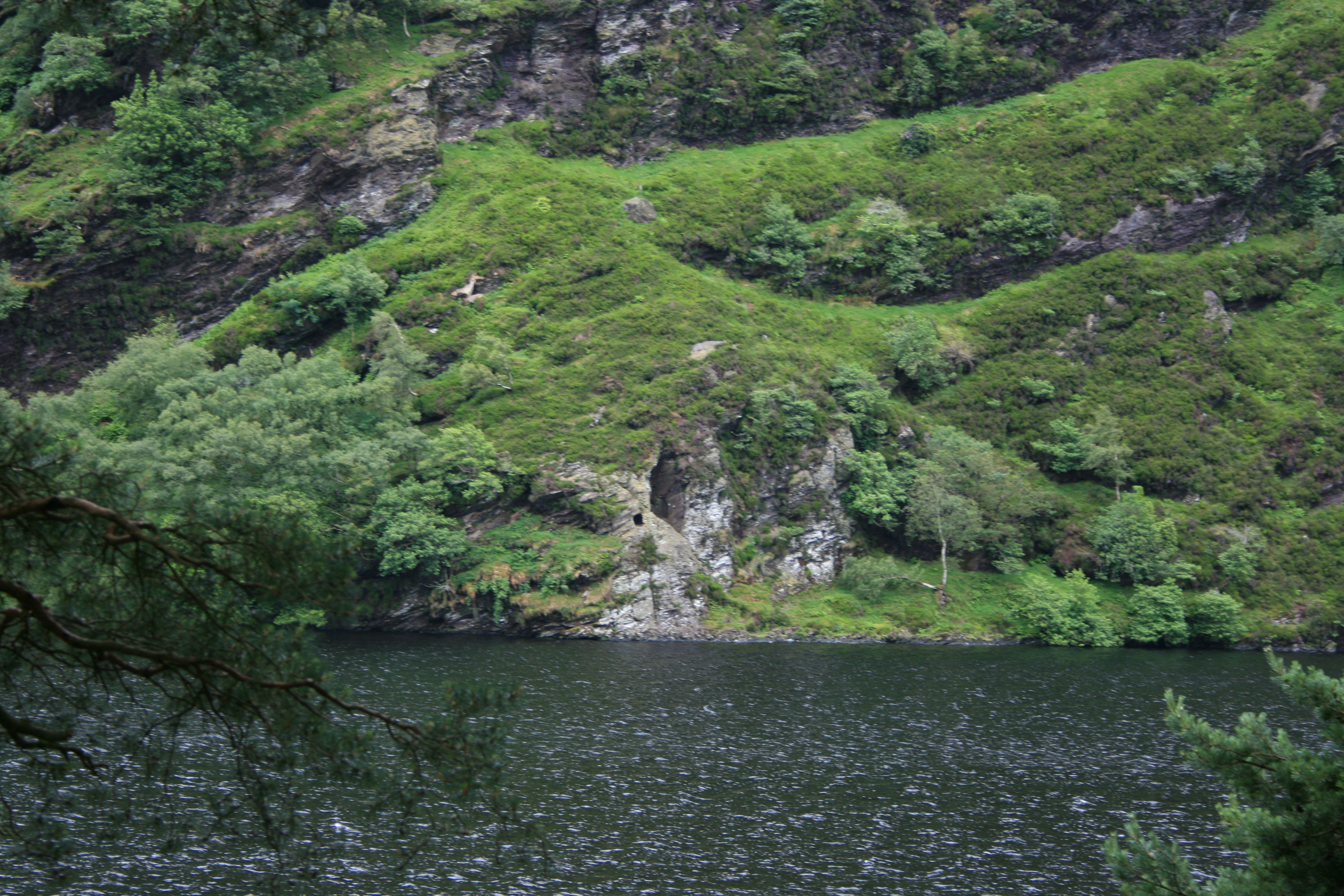
St. Kevin's bed

Bishop Lugidus ordained Kevin who, following his ordination, moved on to Glendalough in order to avoid the company of his followers. He lived as a hermit in a partially man-made cave (sometimes incorrectly described as a Bronze Age tomb) now known as St. Kevin's Bed, to which he was led, in the account of the Vita, by an angel.

St. Kevin's Bed can best be described as a man-made cave cut in the rock face very close to the mountain's edge. It overlooks the upper lake from a height of about 10 metres (30 feet). The approach to the cave is very difficult, with access to it through a rectangular space and a short passageway 1 metre (3 feet) high and 80 centimetres (2 1/2 feet) wide. The inner or main part of the cave is just 1.2 metres (4 feet) wide and less than 1 metre (3 feet) high. It is reasonable to assume that the cave could only have been used as a sleeping place, and would have been impossible for an adult to stand upright in, so it is quite likely that Kevin only used it as his bed, or a place for pious prayer or meditation.

There is a legend that claims that Laurence O'Toole used the "bed" when he frequently made penitential visits to Glendalough, especially during the season of Lent. Michael Dwyer, the famous Wicklow rebel, is reputed to have taken shelter in the "bed" while he was on the run from British soldiers. The story goes that he escaped capturing one morning by diving into the lake and swimming to the opposite side. Today, it is perilous to try to approach the "bed" from the side of Lugduff Mountain. Visitors, in the interests of their own safety, should be content with a distant view of it.

=== Monastery ===
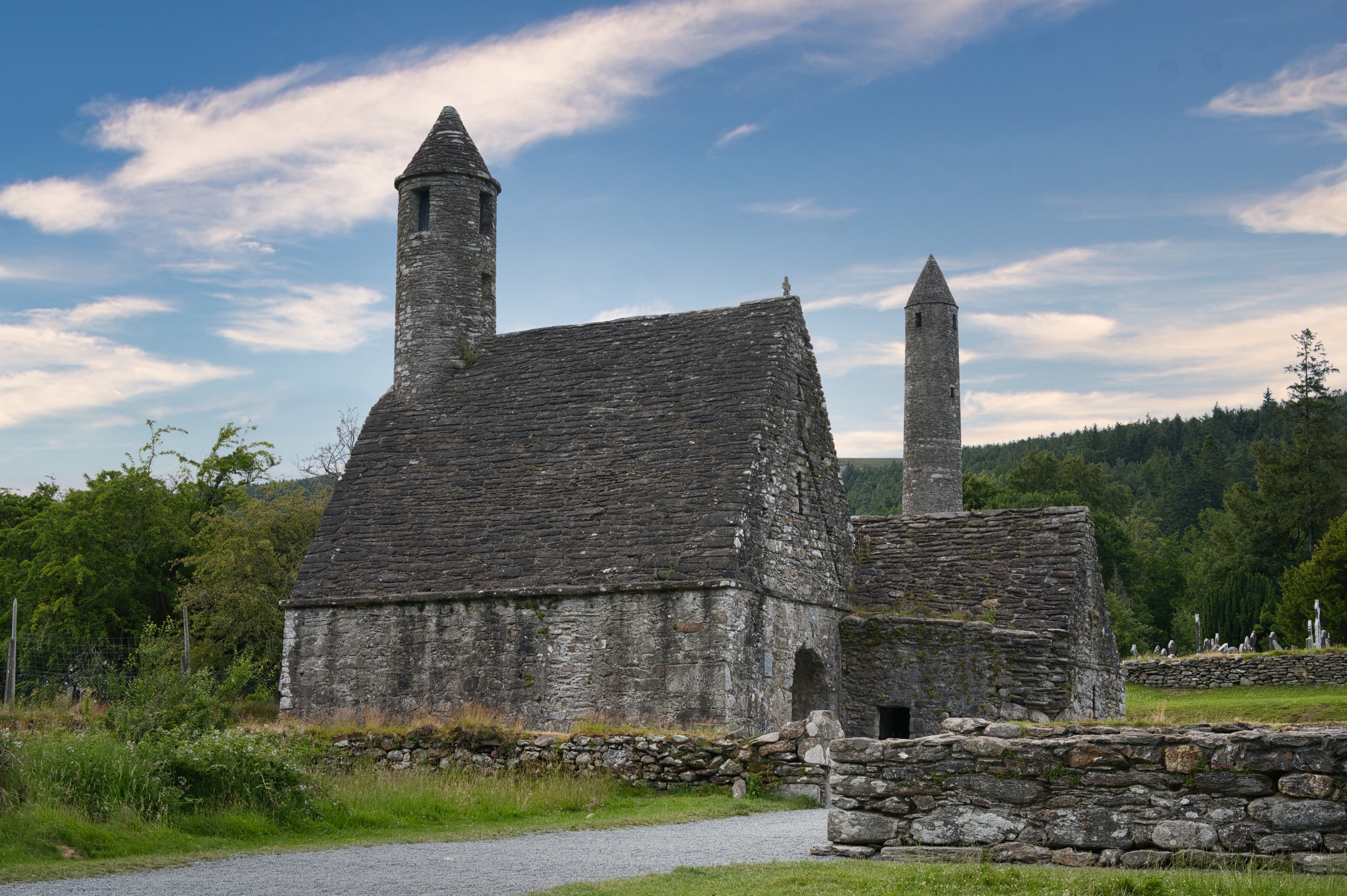
The chapel of St Kevin at Glendalough

Kevin lived the life of a hermit close to nature. His companions were the animals and birds around him. He lived as a hermit for seven years wearing only animal skins, sleeping on stones, and eating very sparingly.

He went barefoot and spent his time in prayer. Disciples were soon attracted to Kevin and a further settlement enclosed by a wall, called Kevin's Cell, was established nearer the lakeshore. By 540 Kevin's fame as a teacher and holy man had spread far and wide. Many people came to seek his help and guidance. Glendalough grew into a renowned seminary of saints and scholars and was the parent of several other monasteries.

In 544, Kevin went to the Hill of Uisneach in County Westmeath to visit the holy abbots, Columba, Comgall and Cannich. He then proceeded to Clonmacnoise, where Cieran had died three days before. Having firmly established his community, he retired into solitude for four years and only returned to Glendalough at the earnest request of his monks. Until his death around 618, Kevin presided over his monastery in Glendalough, living his life by fasting, praying, and teaching. The church of Saint Kevin (Caoimhghin) contained a well-equipped writing room which produced the Book of Glendalough in the 12th century (now located at Bodleian Library), Oxford. Kevin is one of the patron saints of the Diocese of Dublin.

He belonged to the second order of Irish saints. Eventually, Glendalough, with its seven churches, became one of the chief pilgrimage destinations in Ireland.

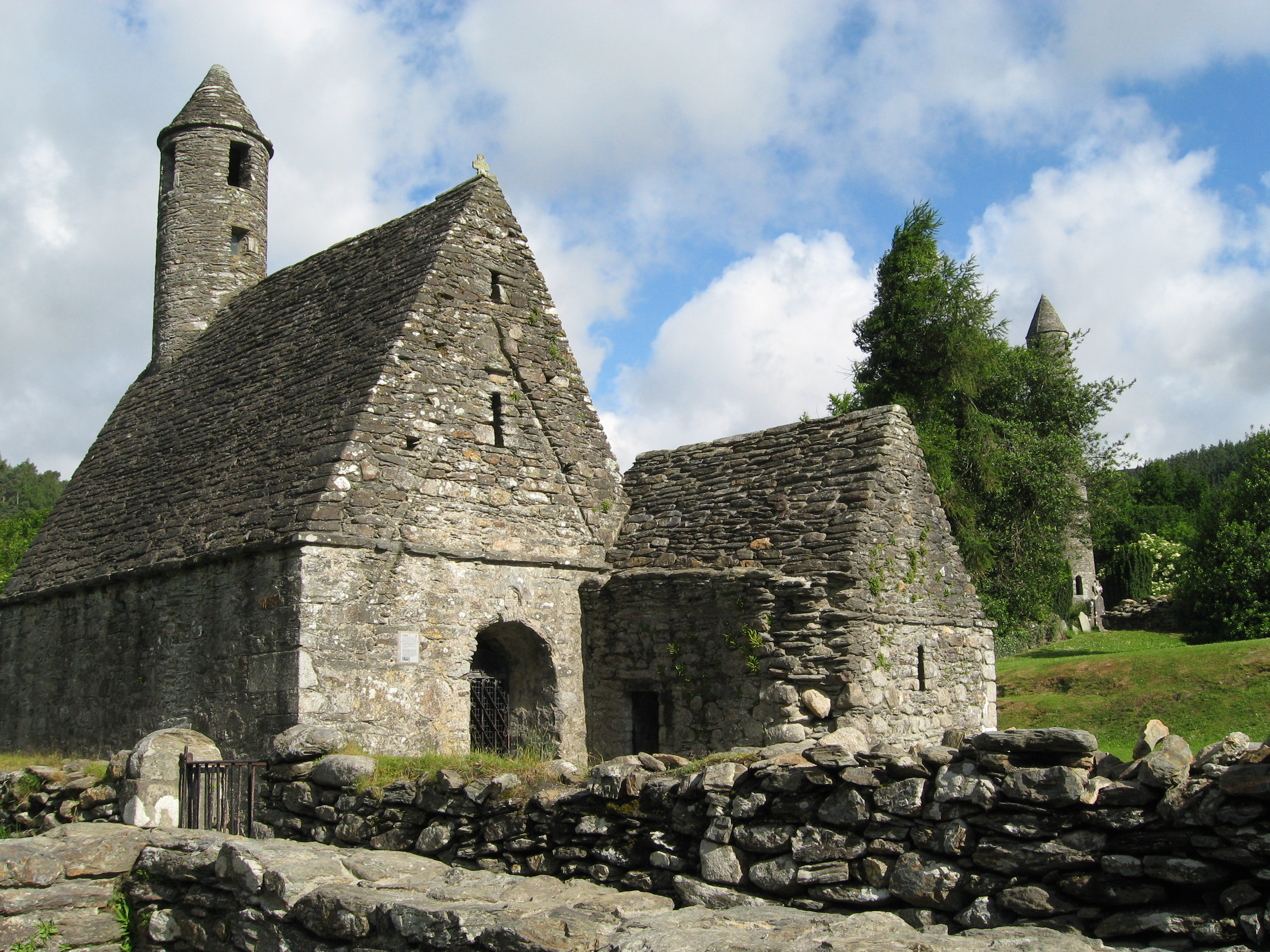
St Kevin's Church, with the Round Tower of Glendalough in the background at right

== Legacy and veneration ==
One of the most widely known poems of the Nobel prizewinner Seamus Heaney, 'St Kevin and the Blackbird', relates the story of Kevin holding out his hand with trance-like stillness while a blackbird builds a nest in it, lays eggs, the eggs hatch and the chicks fledge. A series of paintings by the Welsh artist Clive Hicks-Jenkins around 2009 depicted the story of Kevin and the blackbird through Heaney's poem.

Kevin is remembered in popular culture as an ascetic. This is commemorated in a folk song about him, "The Glendalough Saint," which describes a legend claiming that he drowned a woman who attempted to seduce him. This was recorded and made popular by The Dubliners. The opening verse is as follows: "In Glendalough lived an auld saint, renowned for his learning and piety, his manners were curious and quaint, and he looked upon girls with disparity."

The independent film-maker Kevin Smith refers irreverently to his namesake "Saint Kevin" and the key events of his life in the introduction to Sold Out: A Threevening with Kevin Smith, his 2008 live Q & A show.

Kevin is referenced several times in Finnegans Wake by James Joyce. The longest episode is found in Pt IV, pgs 604–607 (Faber & Faber, Viking editions). It was one of the earliest-drafted "vignettes" and much revised before final publication.
