= Mullacor =

Mountain in County Wicklow, Ireland

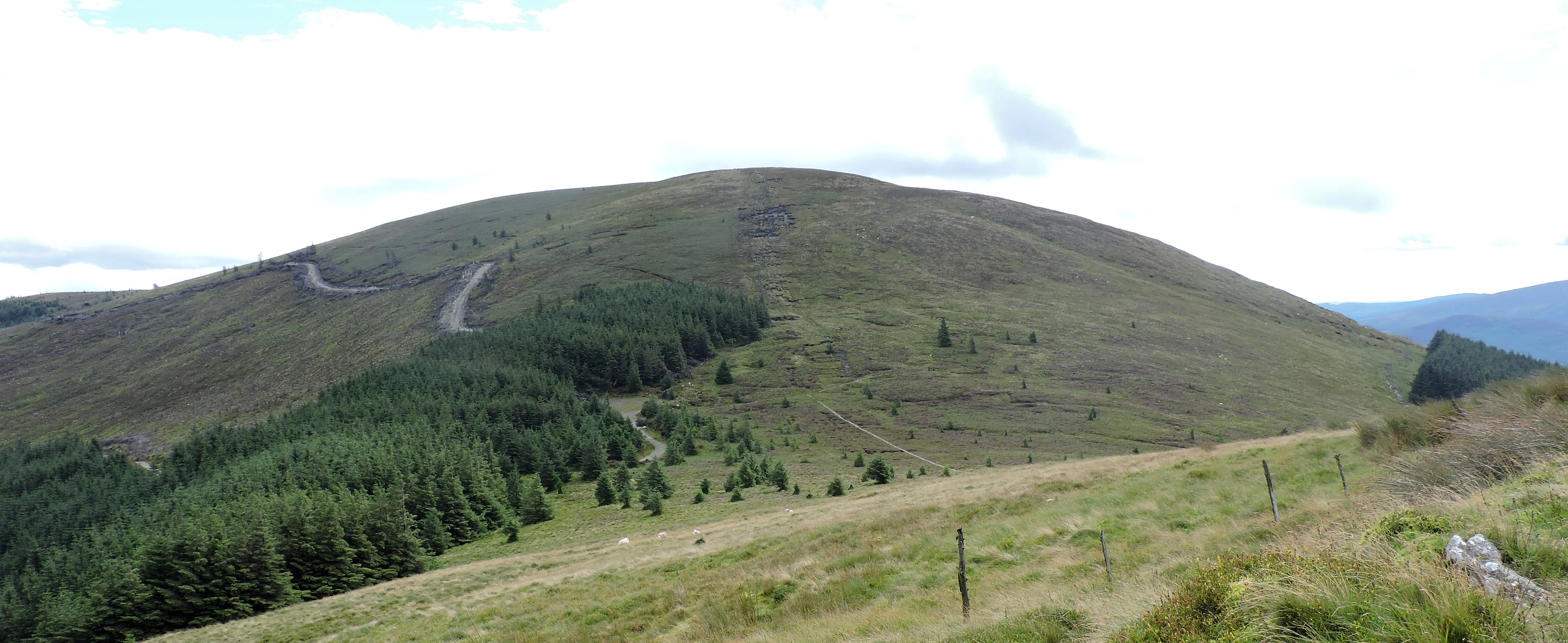
- View from the slopes of Lugduff

Highest point
- Elevation: 661 m (2,169 ft)
- Prominence: 102 m (335 ft)
- Isolation: 3.27 km (2.03 mi)
- Listing: 100 Highest Irish Mountains, Hewitt, Arderin, Simm, Vandeleur-Lynam
- Coordinates: 52°59′6″N 6°22′26″W

Naming
- Native name: Mullaigh Mhór
- English translation: big hilltop

Geography
- Location within island of Ireland
- Location: County Wicklow, Ireland
- Parent range: Wicklow Mountains
- OSI/OSNI grid: T0927493925
- Topo map: OSi Discovery 56

Geology
- Mountain type(s): Dark blue-grey slate, phyllite & schist

Mullacor (Irish: Mullaigh Mhór, meaning 'big hilltop') at 661 metres (2,169 ft), is an Irish mountain.

== Features ==
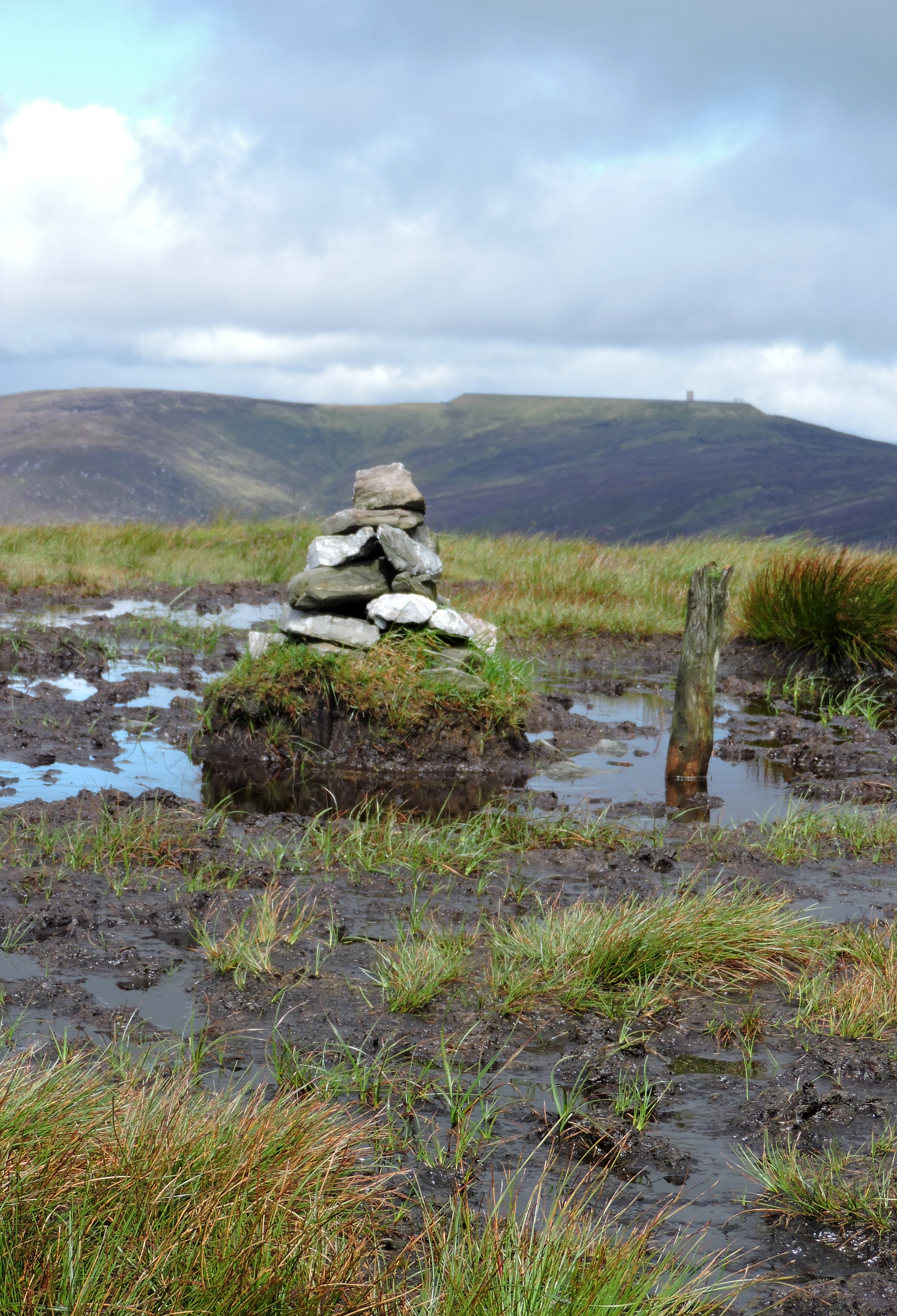
Summit cairn, view to Turlough Hill

Mullacor is the 141st–highest peak in Ireland on the Arderin scale, and the 172nd–highest peak on the Vandeleur-Lynam scale. It's situated in the southern sector of the Wicklow Mountains range, and forms a broad horseshoe around the Upper Lake of the Glendalough valley with the mountains of Lugduff 652 metres (2,139 ft), Conavalla 734 metres (2,408 ft), the hydroelectric station at Turlough Hill 681 metres (2,234 ft), and Camaderry 699 metres (2,293 ft). Mullacor's western flank forms the step sides of the neighbouring Glenmalure valley. To the east of Mullacor is Cullentragh Mountain 510 metres (1,670 ft).

Mullacor's prominence of 102 metres (335 ft) does not qualify it as a Marilyn, but it does rank it as the 90th-highest mountain in Ireland on the MountainViews Online Database, 100 Highest Irish Mountains, where the minimum prominence threshold is 100 metres.

== Bibliography ==
- Fairbairn, Helen (2014). Dublin & Wicklow: A Walking Guide. Collins Press. ISBN 978-1848892019.
- Fairbairn, Helen (2014). Ireland's Best Walks: A Walking Guide. Collins Press. ISBN 978-1848892118.
- MountainViews Online Database (Simon Stewart) (2013). A Guide to Ireland's Mountain Summits: The Vandeleur-Lynams & the Arderins. Collins Books. ISBN 978-1-84889-164-7.
- Dillion, Paddy (1993). The Mountains of Ireland: A Guide to Walking the Summits. Cicerone. ISBN 978-1852841102.

== See also ==
- Wicklow Way
- Wicklow Mountains
- Lists of mountains in Ireland
- List of mountains of the British Isles by height
- List of Hewitt mountains in England, Wales and Ireland
