= Lugduff =

Mountain in County Wicklow, Ireland

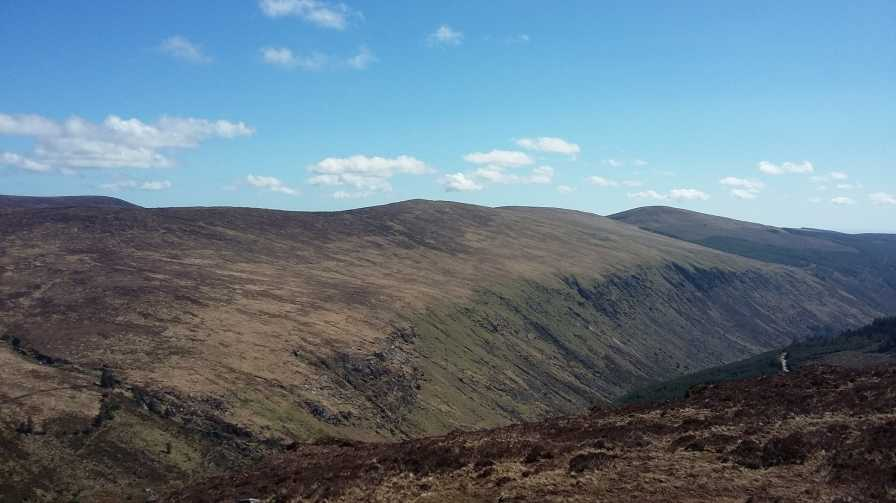
- Summit of Lugduff from across the Glenmalure valley on Camenabologue.

Highest point
- Elevation: 652 m (2,139 ft)
- Prominence: 97 m (318 ft)
- Listing: Hewitt, Arderin, Simm, Vandeleur-Lynam
- Coordinates: 52.998733°N 6.403708°W

Naming
- Native name: Log Dubh
- English translation: black hollow

Geography
- Location within island of Ireland
- Location: County Wicklow, Ireland
- Parent range: Wicklow Mountains
- OSI/OSNI grid: T0722095361
- Topo map: OSi Discovery 56

Geology
- Mountain type(s): Dark blue-grey slate, phyllite & schist

Lugduff (Irish: Log Dubh, meaning 'black hollow') at 652 metres (2,139 ft), is the 154th–highest peak in Ireland on the Arderin scale, and the 186th–highest peak on the Vandeleur-Lynam scale. Lugduff is situated in the southern sector of the Wicklow Mountains range, and forms a broad horseshoe around the Upper Lake of the Glendalough valley with the mountains of Mullacor 661 metres (2,169 ft), Conavalla 734 metres (2,408 ft), the hydroelectric station at Turlough Hill 681 metres (2,234 ft), and Camaderry 699 metres (2,293 ft).

Lugduff's steep western slopes, have a distinctive "corrugated" profile, and form the deep valley sidewall of the eastern flank of Glenmalure; Lugduff's western walls also sit at the T-junction of the Fraughan Rock Glen hanging valley with the Glenmalure valley.

Just below Lugduff's summit, lies the popular 8-kilometre boarded mountain path of The Spinc White Trail around the Upper Lake of Glendalough. To the south of Lugduff is the subsidiary summit of Lugduff SE Top 637 metres (2,090 ft).

== Bibliography ==
- Fairbairn, Helen (2014). Dublin & Wicklow: A Walking Guide. Collins Press. ISBN 978-1848892019.
- Fairbairn, Helen (2014). Ireland's Best Walks: A Walking Guide. Collins Press. ISBN 978-1848892118.
- MountainViews Online Database (Simon Stewart) (2013). A Guide to Ireland's Mountain Summits: The Vandeleur-Lynams & the Arderins. Collins Books. ISBN 978-1-84889-164-7.
- Dillion, Paddy (1993). The Mountains of Ireland: A Guide to Walking the Summits. Cicerone. ISBN 978-1852841102.

== Gallery ==
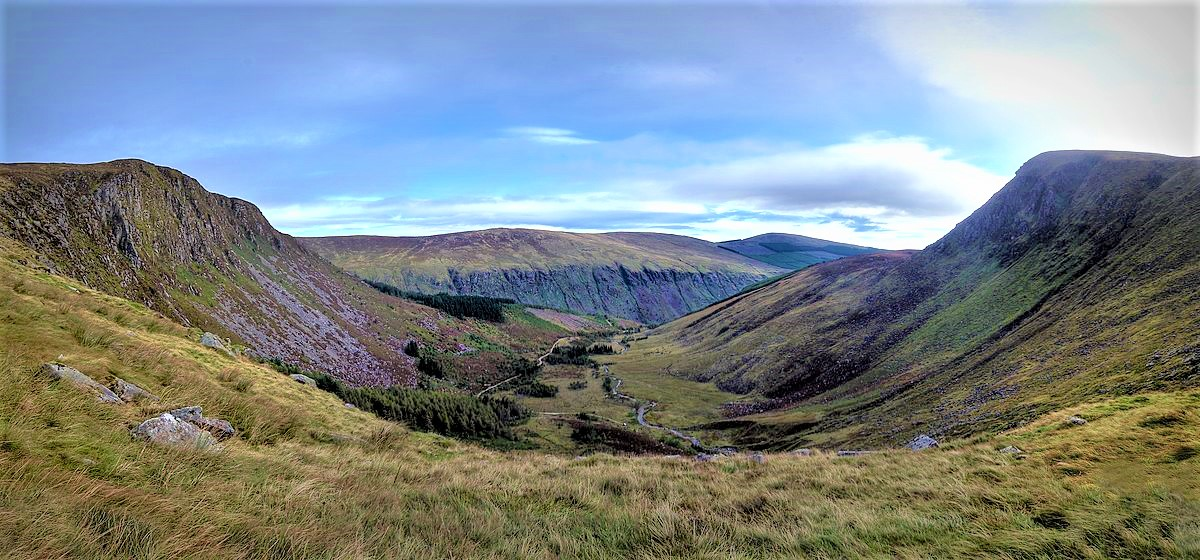
Summit of Lugduff and its western slopes, from the Fraughan Rock Glen

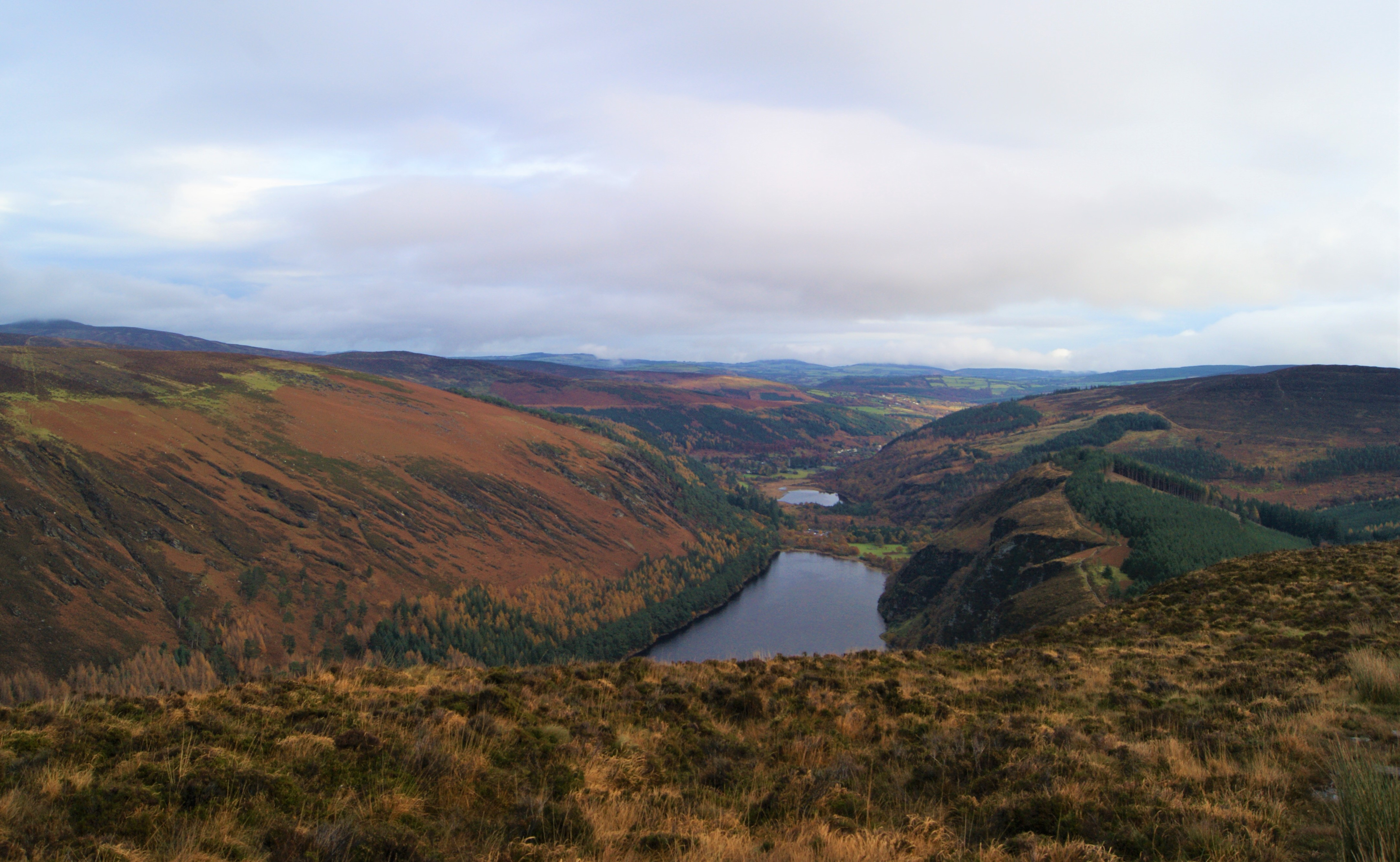
View from summit into Glendalough, Upper (near) and Lower (far) lakes

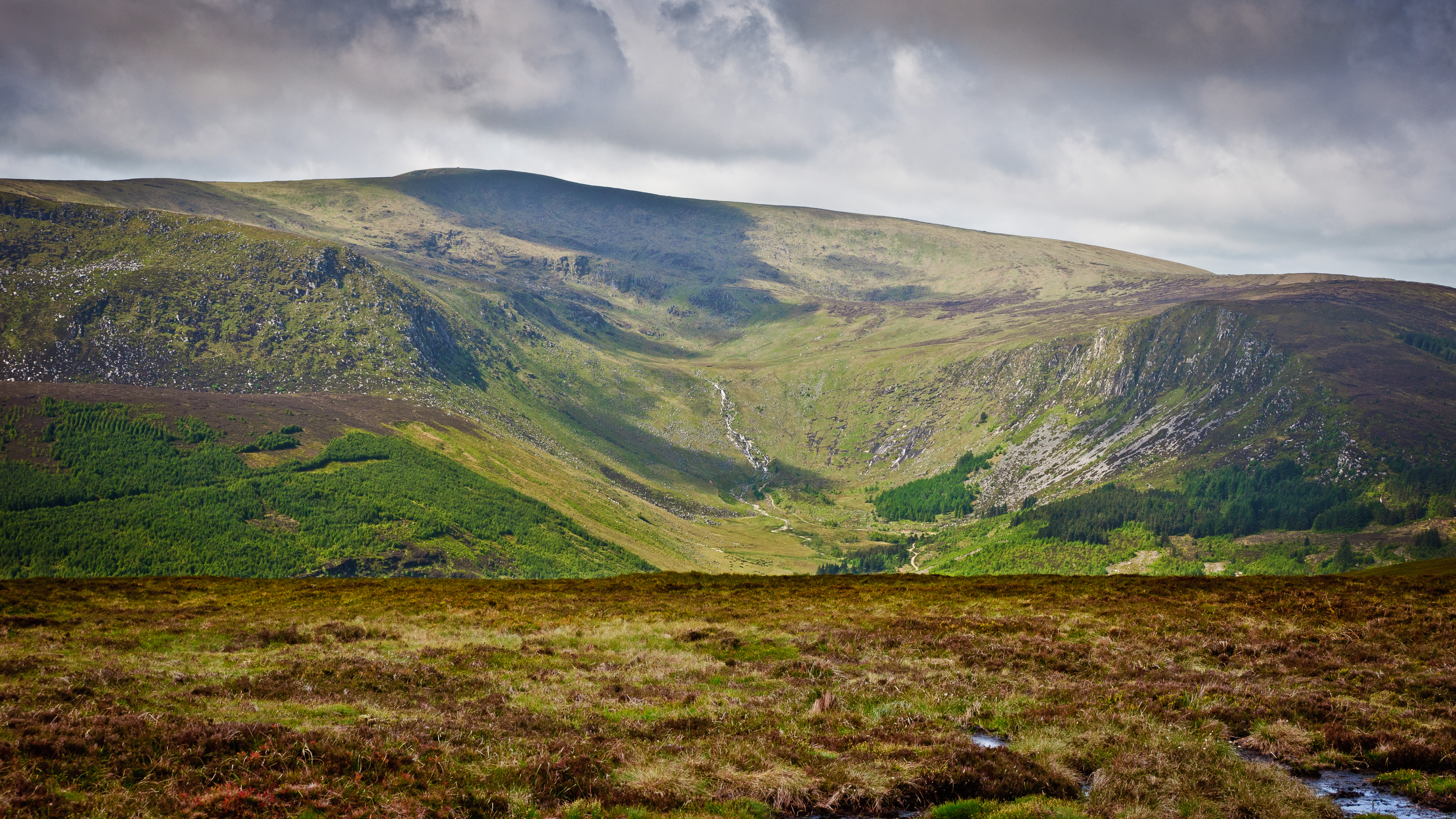
View from summit across Glenmalure into Fraughan Rock Glen, and Lugnaquilla

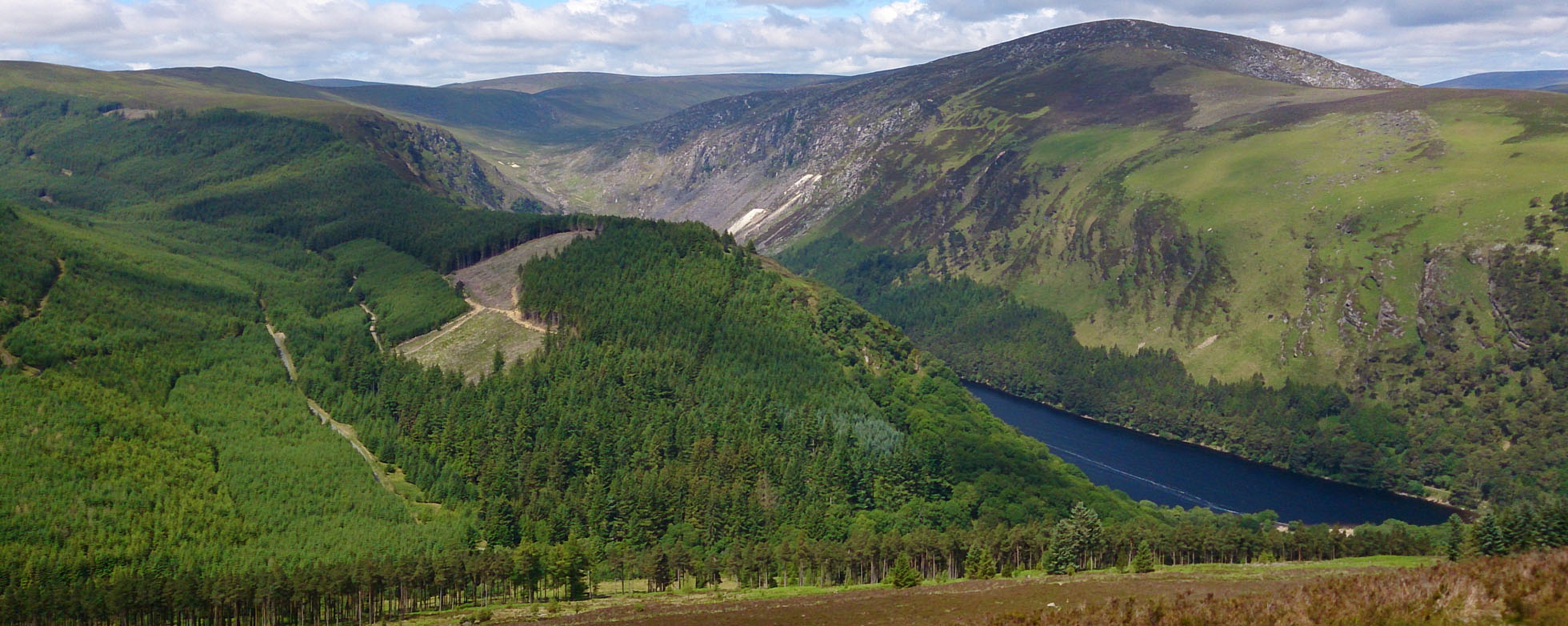
Lugduff (far left), The Spinc (near, forested), and Camaderry (right)

== See also ==
- Wicklow Way
- Wicklow Mountains
- Lists of mountains in Ireland
- List of mountains of the British Isles by height
- List of Hewitt mountains in England, Wales and Ireland
