= Avonbeg =

Avonbeg may refer to:

- River Avonbeg
- Avonbeg, a local estate in Tallaght, Dublin
