= Table Mountain (Wicklow) =

Mountain in County Wicklow, Ireland

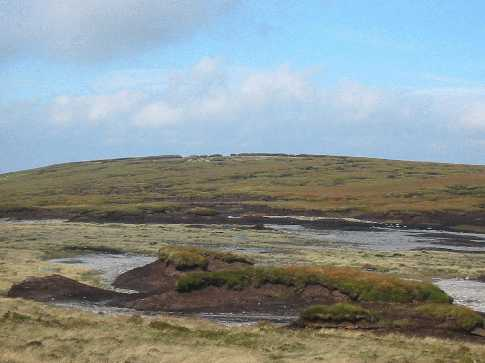
- Flat summit of Table Mountain

Highest point
- Elevation: 702 m (2,303 ft)
- Prominence: 16 m (52 ft)
- Listing: Arderin Beg, Vandeleur-Lynam
- Coordinates: 53.01716°N 6.481634°W

Geography
- Location within island of Ireland
- Location: County Wicklow, Ireland
- Parent range: Wicklow Mountains
- OSI/OSNI grid: T019972
- Topo map: OSi Discovery 56

Geology
- Mountain type: Granite with microcline phenocrysts

Table Mountain is a 702-metre (2,303 ft) peak in the southern section of the Wicklow Mountains range in Ireland. With a prominence of only 16 metres (52 ft), it is only listed in a few of the recognised categories of mountains in Ireland; it is the 110th–highest peak on the Vandeleur-Lynam Irish scale. Table Mountain is at the apex of a horseshoe-shaped "boggy" massif with its larger neighbours, Camenabologue 758 metres (2,487 ft) and Conavalla 734 metres (2,408 ft) that sit at the head of the Glenmalure valley; all three peaks lie close to the "central spine" of the range as it runs from Kippure in the north, to Lugnaquillia in the south. There is no recorded Irish language name for Table Mountain, and it has no connection with Table Mountain in Cape Town, South Africa.

== Plane crash ==
On the afternoon of 7 March 1957, between 12:30 and 12:45pm, a Percival Provost training plane crashed into the slopes of Table Mountain in thick fog resulting in the death of its pilot, an Irish Air Corps lieutenant. The pilot was 21-year-old Patrick L. O'Connor, of Clooneyquin, Castlerea, County Roscommon. The plane had left Baldonnel Aerodrome, Dublin at 11:15am that morning for an intended training flight over the counties of Offaly and Wicklow, but was believed to have lost contact with the control tower shortly after departure. The explosion was heard by forestry workers on nearby Conavalla Mountain who rushed to assist and were able to raise the alarm. Parts of the aircraft, which were scattered over an area of 80 yards, still remained on the slopes of the mountain as of 2010.

== Bibliography ==
- Fairbairn, Helen (2014). Dublin & Wicklow: A Walking Guide. Collins Press. ISBN 978-1848892019.
- MountainViews Online Database (Simon Stewart) (2013). A Guide to Ireland's Mountain Summits: The Vandeleur-Lynams & the Arderins. Collins Books. ISBN 978-1-84889-164-7.
- Dillion, Paddy (1993). The Mountains of Ireland: A Guide to Walking the Summits. Cicerone. ISBN 978-1852841102.

== See also ==
- Wicklow Way
- Wicklow Mountains
- Lists of mountains in Ireland
- List of mountains of the British Isles by height
- List of Hewitt mountains in England, Wales and Ireland
