= Glenmalure =

Glacial U-shaped valley in Wicklow, Ireland

- Gleann Molúra
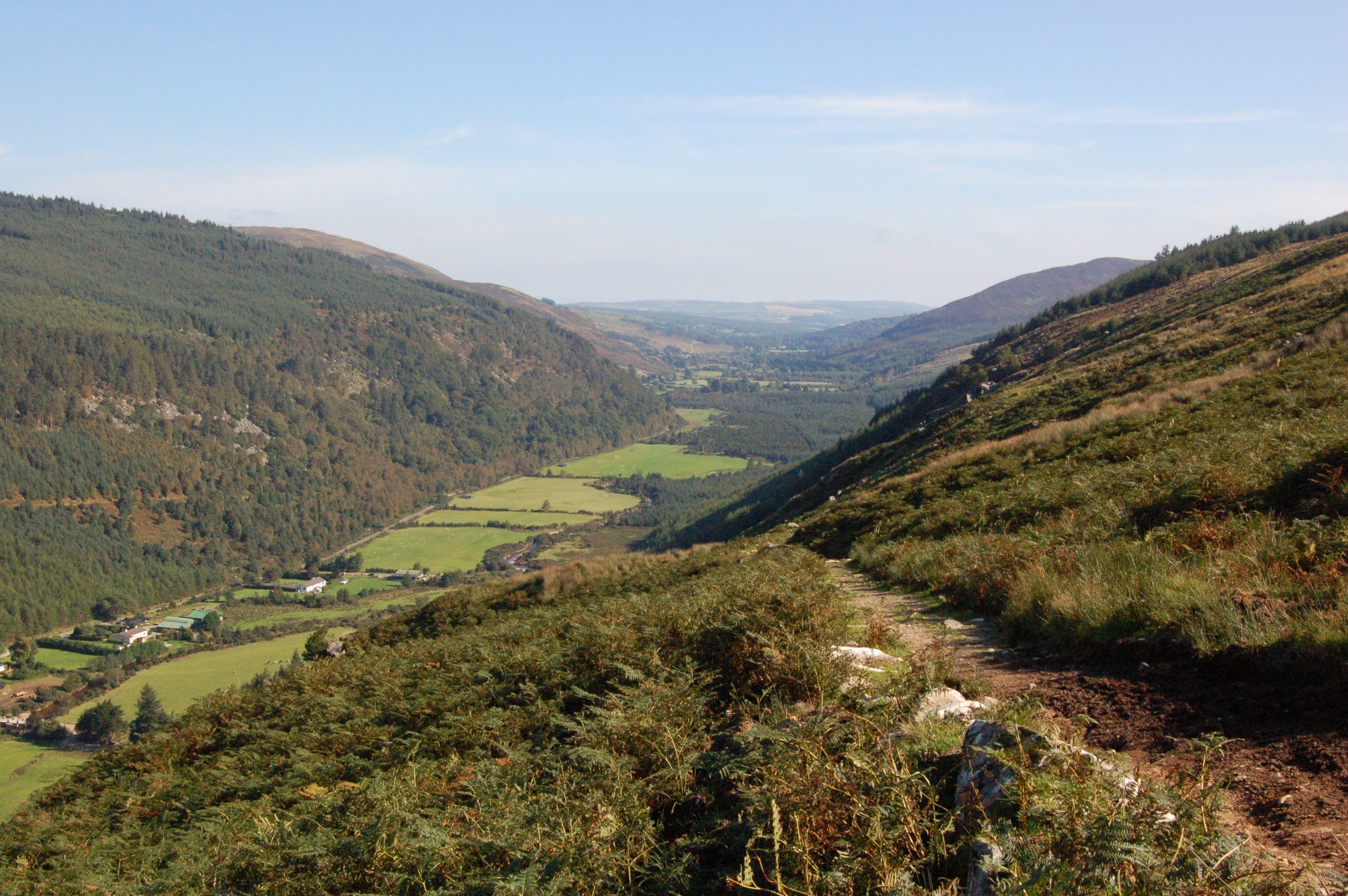
- Glenmalure Valley

- Location within Ireland
- Length: 20 km (12 mi) NW-SE
- Width: 0.8 km (0.50 mi)
- Area: 405 Ma
- Depth: 0.35 km (0.22 mi)

Geology
- Type: U-shaped glacial valley

Geography
- Location: Wicklow Mountains, Ireland
- Borders on: Glendalough; Lugnaquilla
- Coordinates: 52°57′30″N 6°21′25″W
- Topo map: OSi Discovery 56
- Traversed by: The Glen Road
- Rivers: River Avonbeg
- Interactive map of Glenmalure

Glenmalure (Irish: Gleann Molúra) is a 20-kilometre long U-shaped glacial valley in the Wicklow Mountains in Ireland. Glenmalure is an important base for climbing in the Wicklow mountains, and particularly accessing the massif of Lugnaquilla, and contains one of the earliest An Óige youth hostels in Ireland. Glenmalure was also an important historical area and the site of the Battle of Glenmalure in 1580, as well as various events in the Irish Rebellion of 1798.

== Geography ==
Glenmalure is a 20-kilometre long glacial valley in the southern sector of the Wicklow Mountains and is one of the longest glacial valleys in Ireland. A number of adjoining hanging valleys, most notably the Fraughan Rock Glen, feed into Glenmalure valley, which was formed by feeder glaciers in the last ice age.

The valley runs from the northwest down to the southeast. Its western flank is dominated by the large massif of Lugnaquilla 925 metres (3,035 ft), the County Top for Wicklow, and the Provincial Top for Leinster. The steep walls of its eastern flank are the western slopes of Lugduff 652 metres (2,139 ft), and Mullacor 657 metres (2,156 ft), who also bound the neighbouring Glendalough valley.

The head of the Glenmalure valley is bounded by a "boggy" horseshoe formed by Camenabologue 758 metres (2,487 ft), Table Mountain 702 metres (2,303 ft), and Conavalla 734 metres (2,408 ft). A number of ancient trails called Table Tracks run between Glenmalure valley, via the cols between Table Mountain and Conavalla mountain, to the Art O'Neill's cross area, thus crossing the "central spine" of the entire Wicklow mountains range.

== Geology ==
Glenmalure valley covers an area underlain by the late-Caledonian (405 Ma) Leinster Granite bedrock and wallrocks. This granite is part of the "Lugnaquillia Pluton", one of the five plutons that comprise the Leinster Granite, and various granite varieties occur along the valley. The wallrocks consist of various metasedimentary lithologies of the Ordovician Maulin Formation. The granite is cut by slightly younger quartz veins containing lead and zinc mineralization. The valley itself and the glacial features within it date from the last ice age.

The base of the valley has a number of cross-valley moraines, as well as lateral moraines along the southwestern side of the valley.

== Recreation ==
Glenmalure is a base for hill walking and mountain climbing activities in the area. The An Óige Glenmalure Youth Hostel, situated at the intersection with the Fraughan Rock Glen, is open during the summer months (no running water or electricity), and dates from 1903 when it was a hunting lodge; several notable figures have stayed in the premises, including Constance Markievicz, Maud Gonne, her son Seán MacBride, Éamon de Valera, and W. B. Yeats.

The 15–kilometre 5–6 hour Glenmalure Loop is described as "the most scenic circuit to Lugnaquilla". It starts in the Baravore car-park (T066942) at the head of the valley and summits Lugnaquilla via the cliff–fringed hanging valley, Fraughan Rock Glen (the Glen is entered via the path at the Glenmalure hostel); but returning via Cloghernagh 800 metres (2,600 ft), and down to the scenic Arts Lough 511 metres (1,677 ft), described as "one of the region's most beautiful sights", before descending back to the start of the Fraughan Rock Glen.

== History ==
Glenmalure contained the stronghold of the Gabhail Raghnal branch of the O'Byrne clan at Balinacor. At Glenmalure in 1274 the O'Byrnes massacred a punitive force sent from Dublin, which was led by the Prior of Kilmainham, William fitz Roger, one of the few survivors, who was taken prisoner. It was the site of the Battle of Glenmalure in 1580, when an English force unsuccessfully tried to take Balinacor, home of the rebel chieftain Fiach MacHugh O'Byrne. It was the worst defeat suffered by an English army in Ireland; they were completely routed with losses of between 500 and 1,000 officers and men, including Sir Peter Carew the younger. A boulder near the Military Road crossroads is carved with an inscription commemorating Fiach MacHugh on one side and Michael Dwyer on the other side.

South of this junction on the road to Rathdangan and Aughrim lies the ruin of Glenmalure Barracks, built by the British army in an attempt to capture rebels after the 1798 rebellion.

== Books ==
- Carmel O'Toole (December 2015). Glenmalure the Wild Heart of the Mountains: A Valley and its People. Era-Maptec. ISBN 978-1873489154.

== Gallery ==
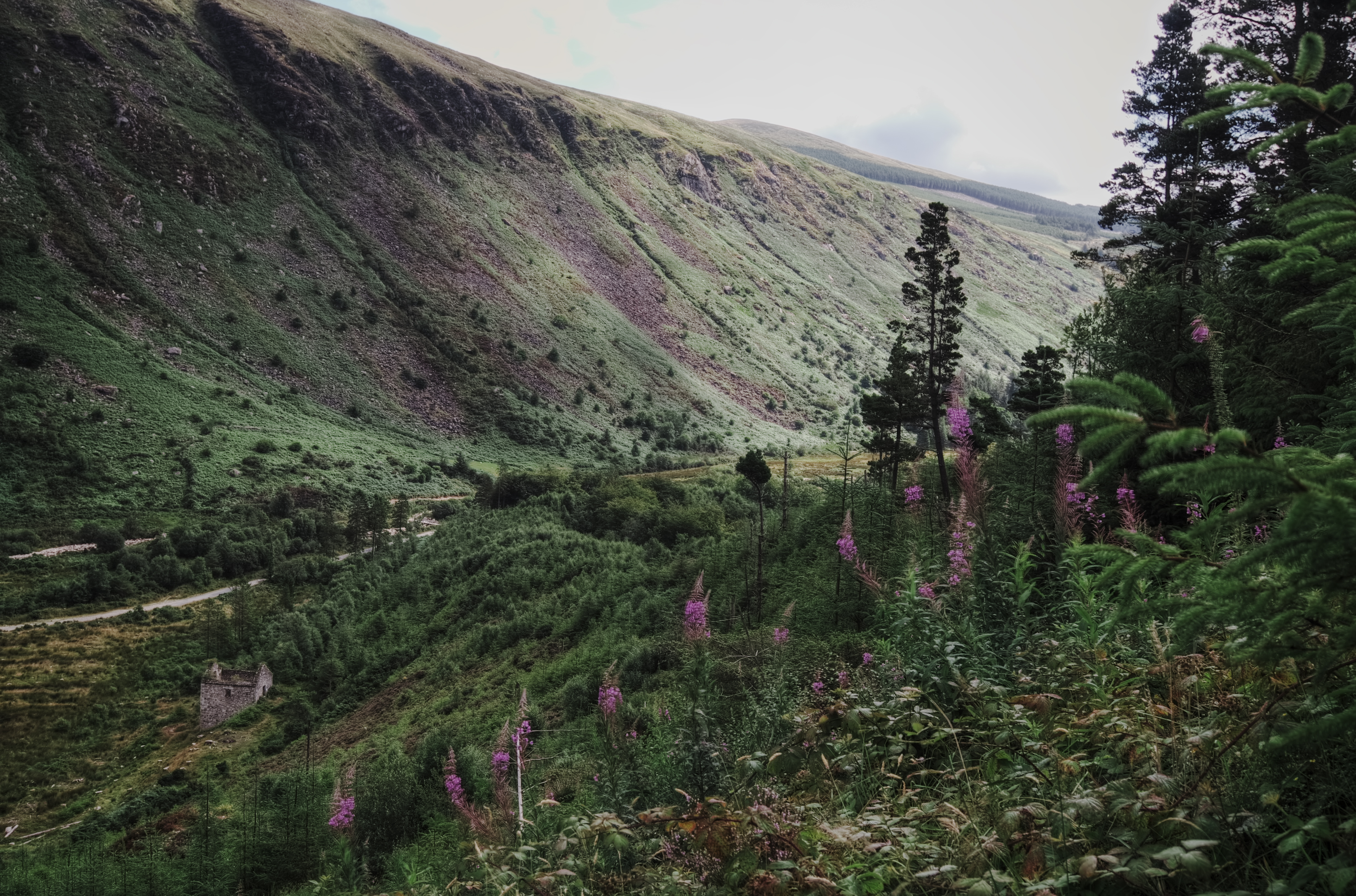
Disused crusher house

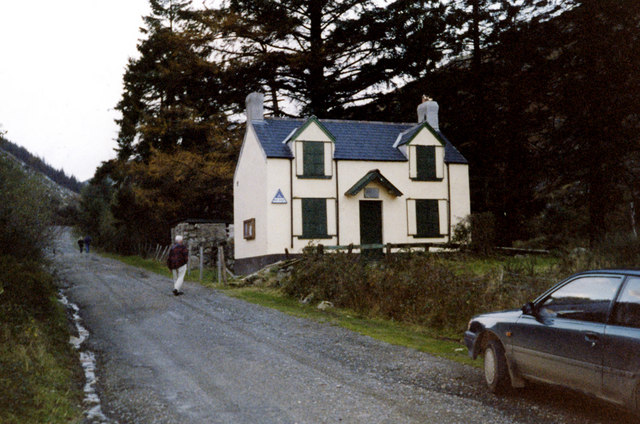
An Óige youth hostel

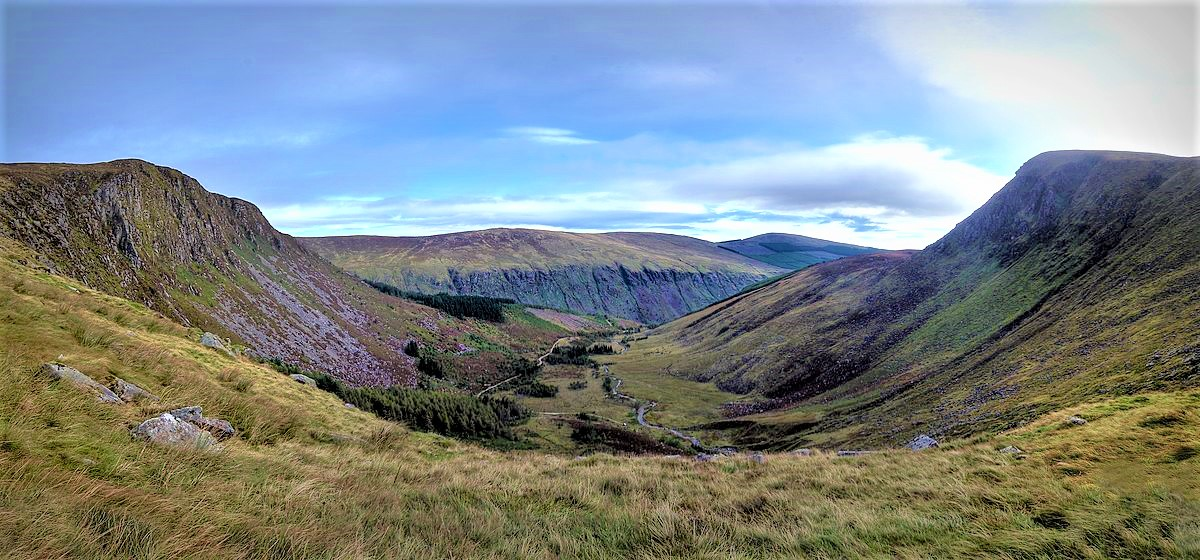
From Fraughan Rock Glen across to summit of Lugduff

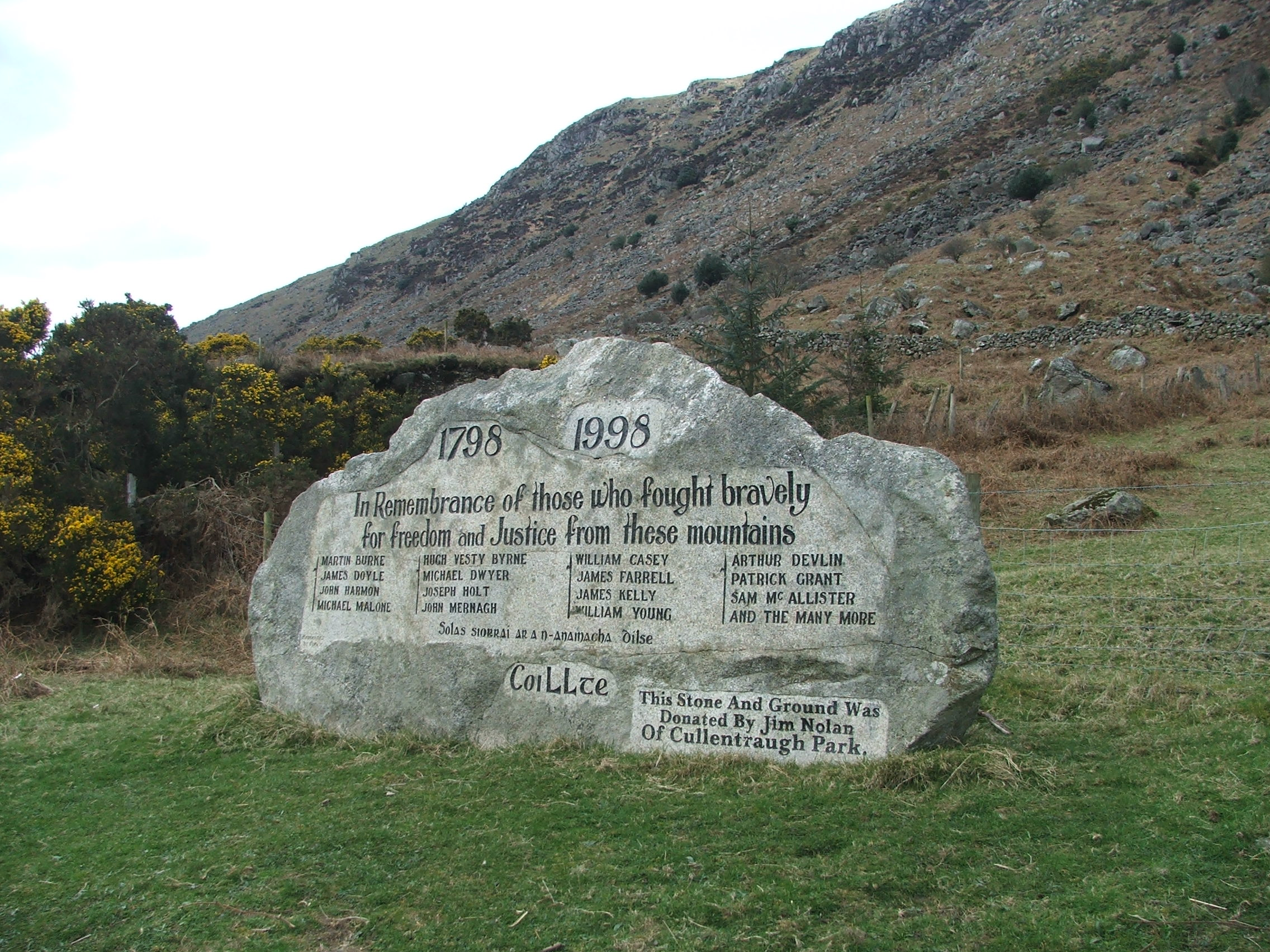
Glenmalure 1798 memorial

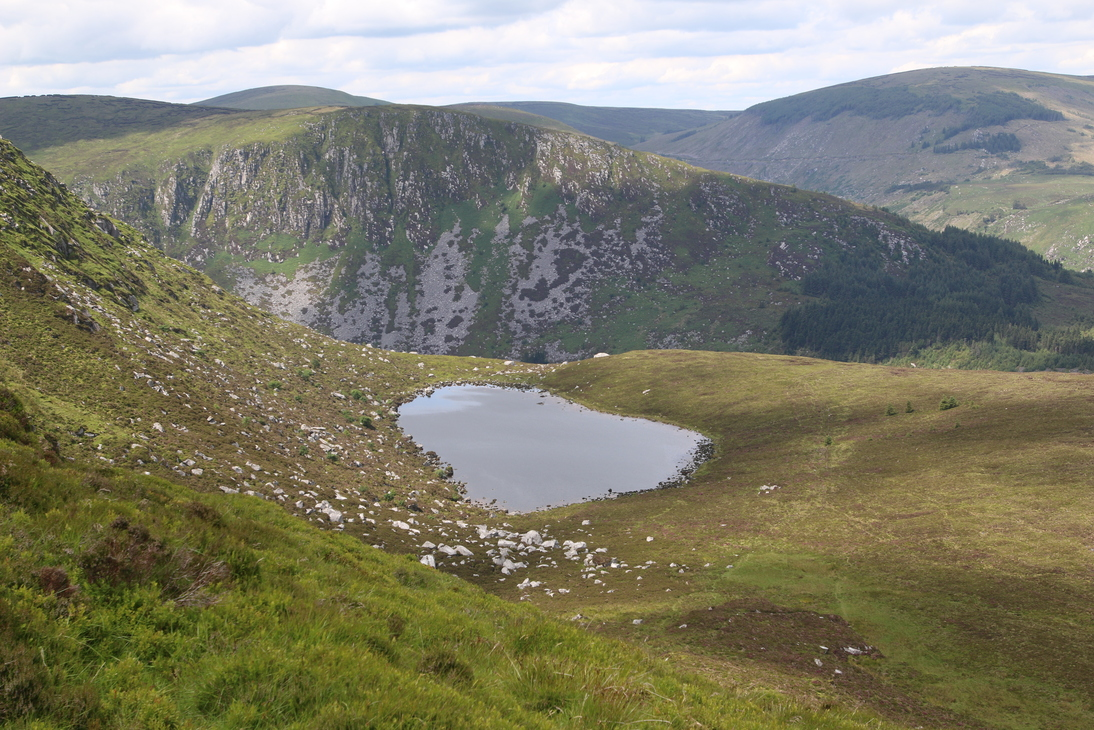
Arts Lough with Conavalla back right

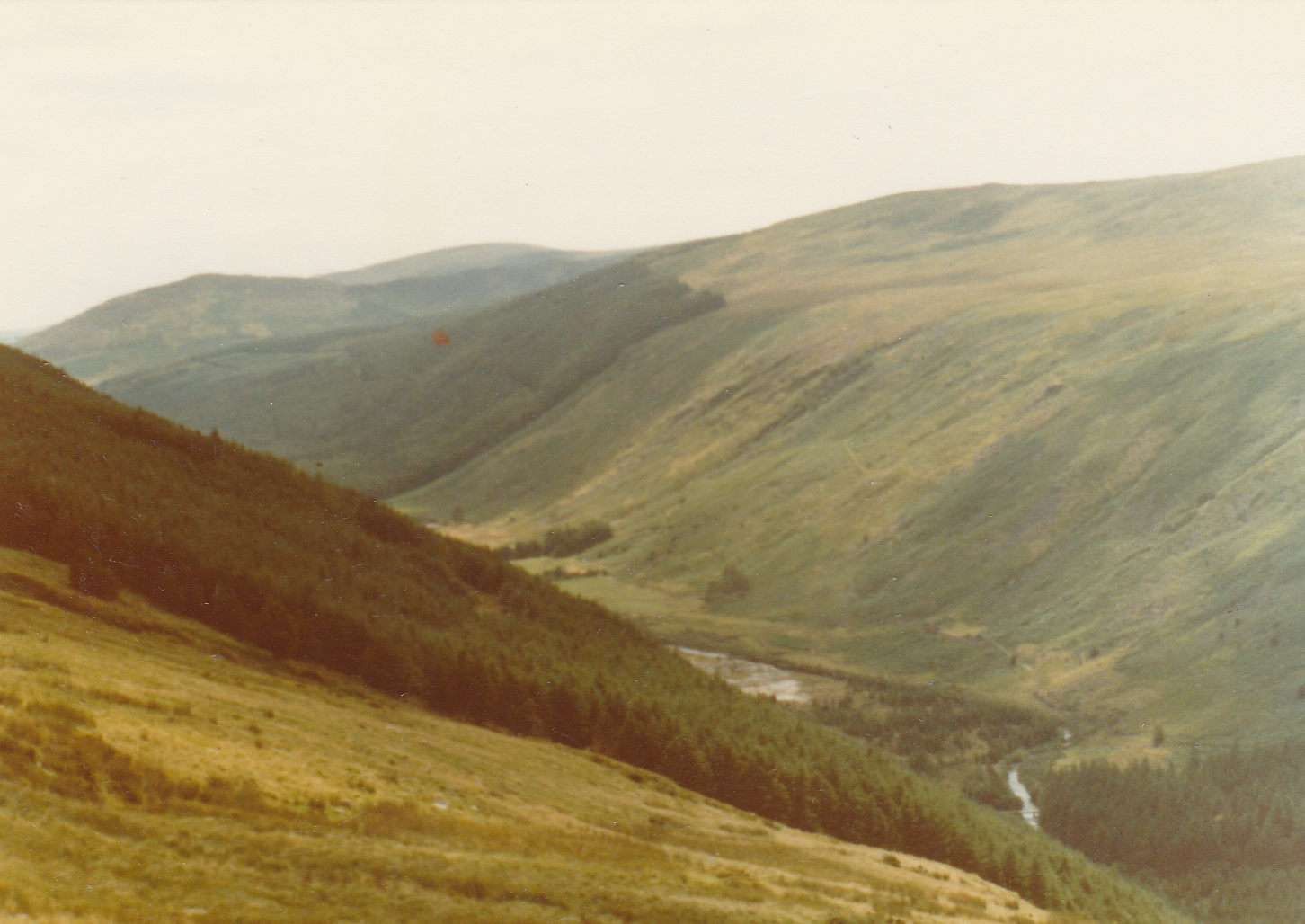
Looking SE down the valley, 1980

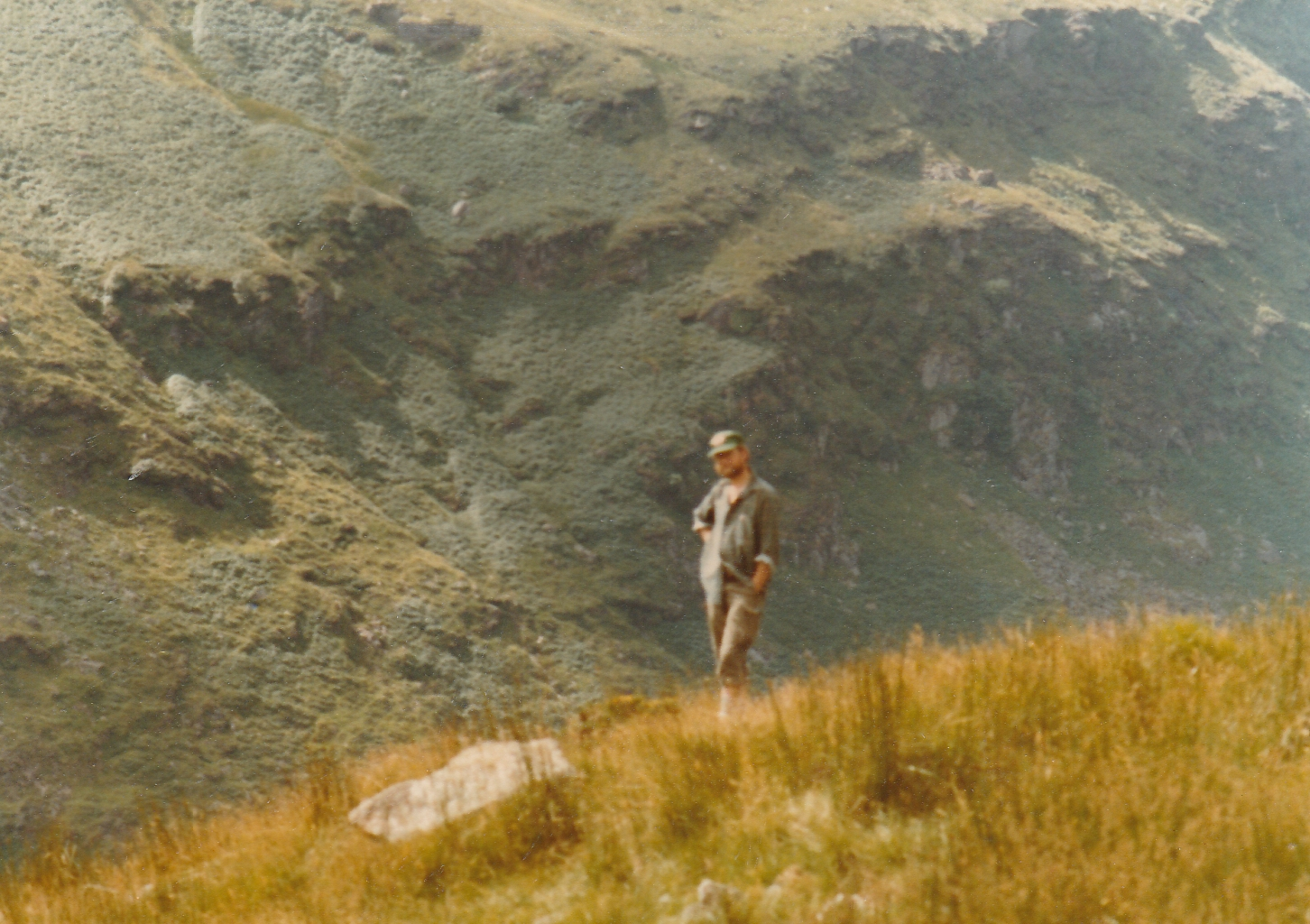
A hillwalker on the eastern side of the valley, 1980

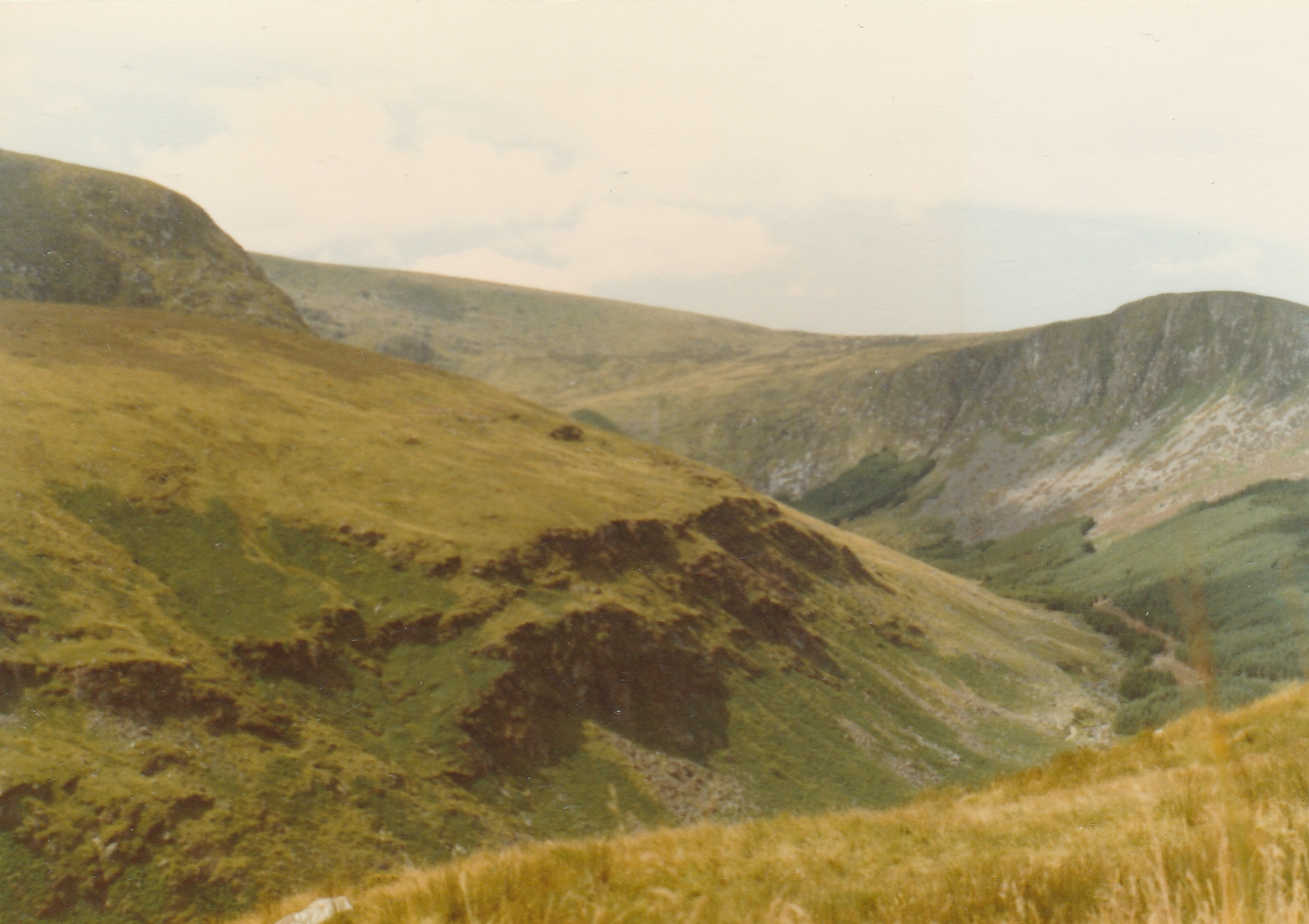
Fraughan Rock Glen, as viewed from the opposite side of the valley

== See also ==
- Wicklow Way
- Wicklow Mountains
- Lists of mountains in Ireland
- Glenmacnass Waterfall
