= River Avonbeg =

Coordinates: 52°54′40″N 6°15′56″W

River Avonbeg Abhainn Beag
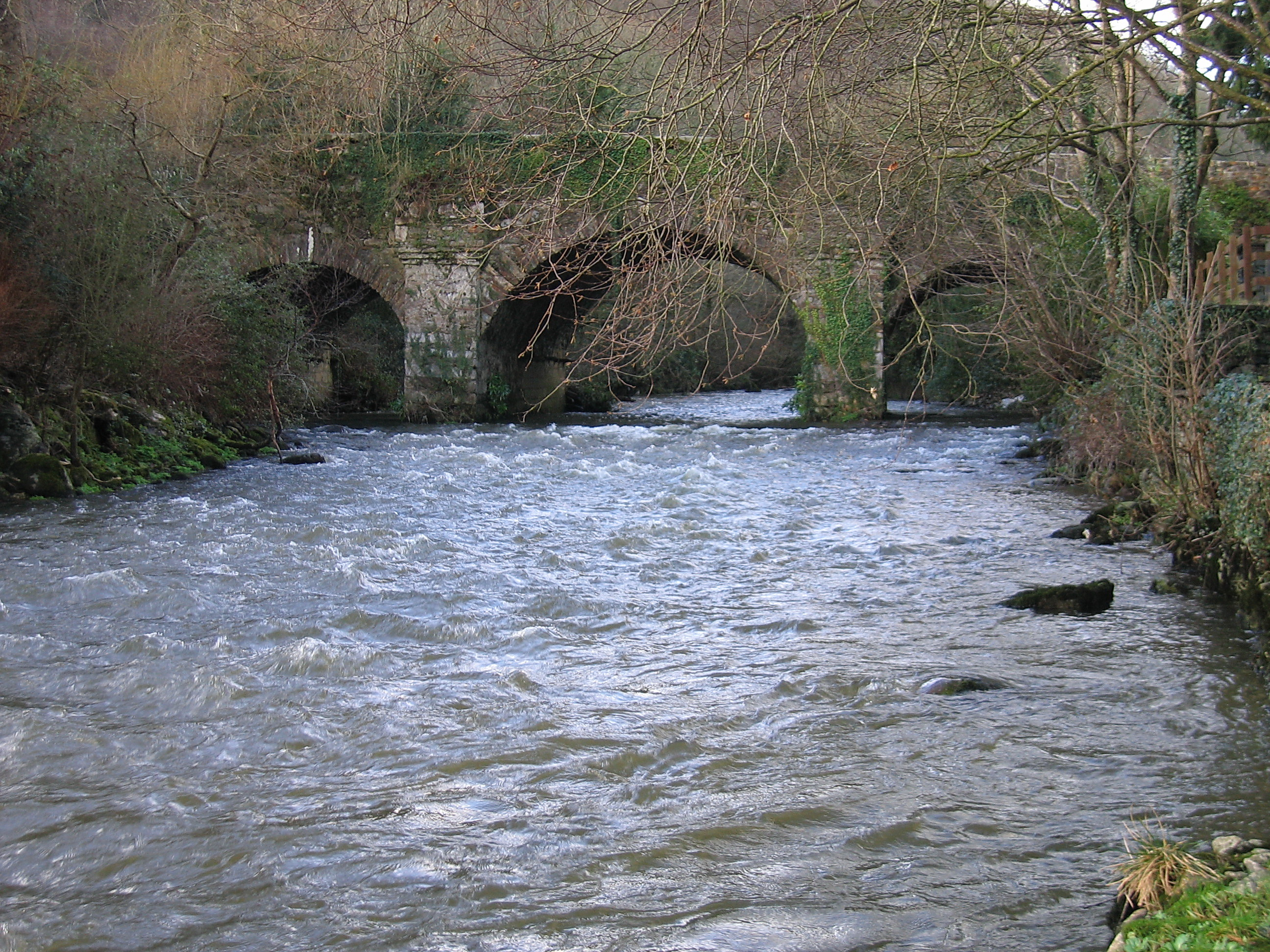
- The Avonbeg flows under the R752

Physical characteristics
- Source
  - location: Camenabologue, County Wicklow
- Mouth: River Avoca
  - location: Meeting of the Waters, County Wicklow

The Avonbeg River (Irish: Abhainn Beag, meaning 'small river') rises on the northern flank of Camenabologue in the Wicklow Mountains and flows southeast into the valley of Glenmalure. It continues southeast through the villages of Greenan and Ballinaclash before joining the Avonmore at the Meeting of the Waters (Cumar an dá Uisce) to form the River Avoca, which in turn discharges into the Irish Sea at Arklow. From source to sea the river remains in East Wicklow. Avonbeg Road, Avonbeg Drive, Avonbeg Park and Avonbeg Gardens in Tallaght, Dublin are named after the river.

== See also ==
- Rivers of Ireland
