= Conavalla =

Mountain in County Wicklow, Ireland

Clonavalla
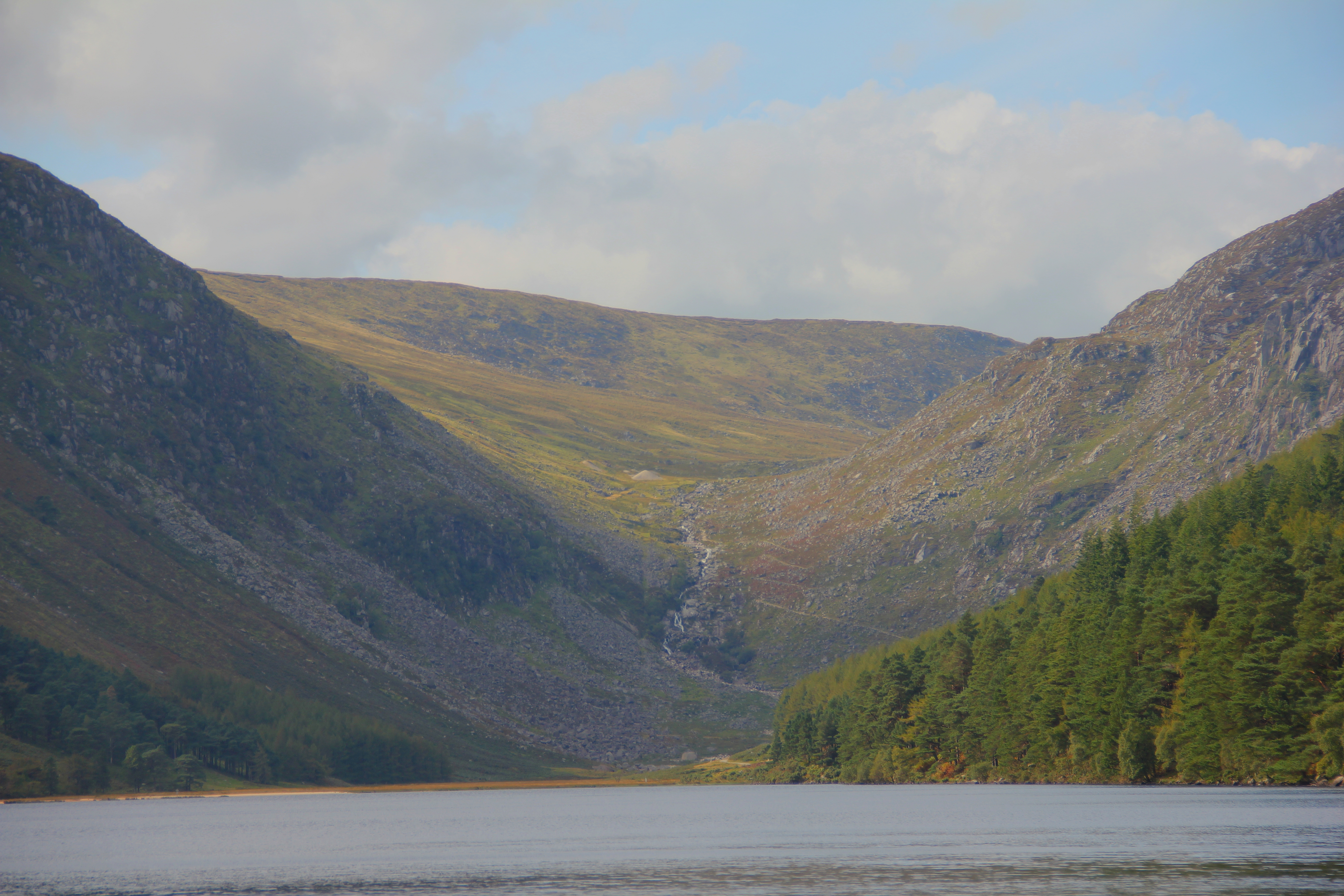
- Massif of Conavalla (centre) as seen from the shores of the Glendalough Upper Lake

Highest point
- Elevation: 734 m (2,408 ft)
- Prominence: 109 m (358 ft)
- Listing: 100 Highest Irish Mountains, Hewitt, Arderin, Simm, Vandeleur-Lynam
- Coordinates: 53°00′55″N 6°27′9″W

Naming
- Native name: Ceann an Bhealaigh
- English translation: head of the road or pass

Geography
- Location within island of Ireland
- Location: County Wicklow, Ireland
- Parent range: Wicklow Mountains
- OSI/OSNI grid: T023959
- Topo map: OSi Discovery 56

Geology
- Mountain type(s): Dark slate-schist, quartzite & coticule

Conavalla (Irish: Ceann an Bhealaigh, meaning 'head of the road or pass') at 734 metres (2,408 ft), is the 69th–highest peak in Ireland on the Arderin scale, and the 85th–highest peak on the Vandeleur-Lynam scale. The summit of Conavalla sits just off the main "central spine" of the Wicklow Mountains, as it runs from Kippure in the north, to Lugnaquillia in the south. Conavalla's large massif to the north-east is described as a "wet and boggy barren plain" whose various shoulders dominate the head of the Glendalough valley, and the upper east-side of the Glenmalure valley.

== Naming ==
Irish academic Paul Tempan notes that the "pass" element of Conavalla's name likely refers to the various routes from the Blessington lakes area (e.g. the R756 road to the Wicklow Gap) in the west that crossed parts of Conavalla's boggy massif to get into the Glenmalure valley in the east (note that the Wicklow Gap can be used to access the neighboring Glendalough valley without having to cross Conavalla's massif). (see § Art O'Neill below).

== Geography ==
Convalla is situated in the southern section of the Wicklow Mountains, and forms a horseshoe on a "boggy" massif, at the head of the Glenmalure valley, with its neighbours, Table Mountain 702 metres (2,303 ft), and Camenabologue 758 metres (2,487 ft).

Conavalla also sits in another broad horseshoe around the Glendalough valley, with the hydroelectric station at Turlough Hill 681 metres (2,234 ft), and the mountains of Camaderry 699 metres (2,293 ft), Lugduff 652 metres (2,139 ft), and Mullacor 661 metres (2,169 ft). Conavalla's large "boggy massif" dominates the head of the Glendalough valley stretching from its summit at the far-west side of the head of the valley, to Lough Firrib 650 metres (2,130 ft) on the east-side. The massif also includes Three Lakes 620 metres (2,030 ft) to the north of the summit of Conavalla.

Conavalla's prominence of 109 metres (358 ft) does not qualify it as a Marilyn, but it does rank it as the 39th-highest mountain in Ireland on the MountainViews Online Database, 100 Highest Irish Mountains, where the minimum prominence threshold is 100 metres.

== Art O'Neill ==
On Conavalla's northern slopes lies Art's Cross and Art's Plaque, dedicated to Art O'Neill, son of Shane O'Neill, who died of exposure in January 1592 helping Hugh Roe O'Donnell to escape from Dublin Castle to the stronghold of Fiach McHugh O'Byrne in the valley of Glenmalure. The escape is commemorated annually in the Art O'Neill Challenge, which crosses over Conavalla.

== Bibliography ==
- Fairbairn, Helen (2014). Dublin & Wicklow: A Walking Guide. Collins Press. ISBN 978-1848892019.
- Fairbairn, Helen (2014). Ireland's Best Walks: A Walking Guide. Collins Press. ISBN 978-1848892118.
- MountainViews Online Database (Simon Stewart) (2013). A Guide to Ireland's Mountain Summits: The Vandeleur-Lynams & the Arderins. Collins Books. ISBN 978-1-84889-164-7.
- Dillion, Paddy (1993). The Mountains of Ireland: A Guide to Walking the Summits. Cicerone. ISBN 978-1852841102.

== Gallery ==
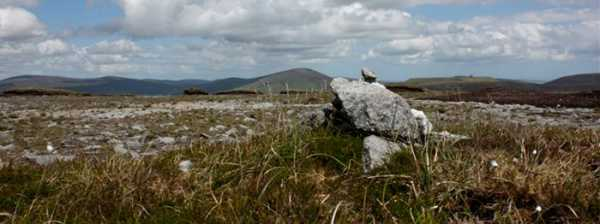
Summit cairn

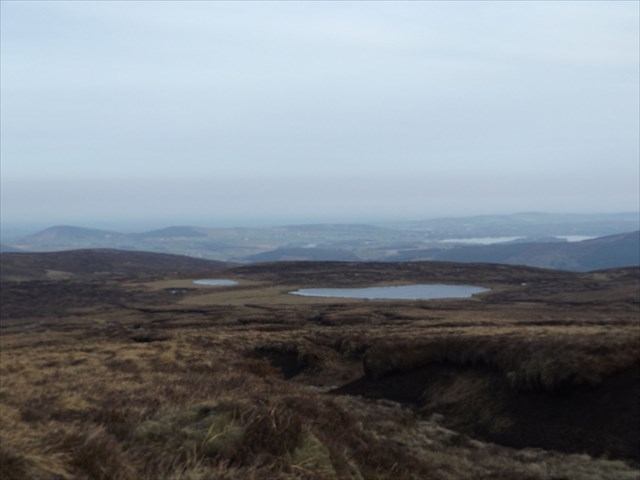
Three Lakes

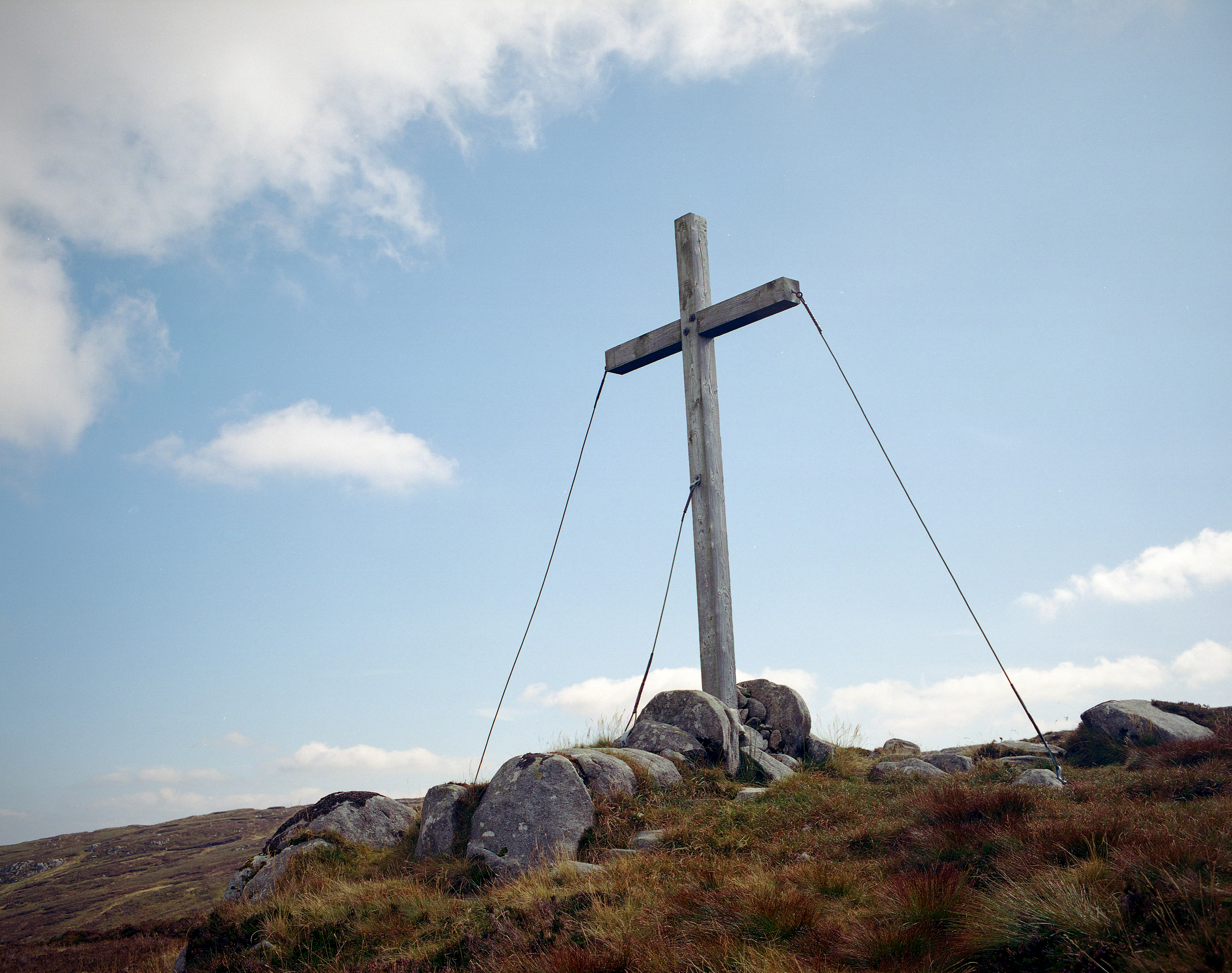
Art O'Neill's cross

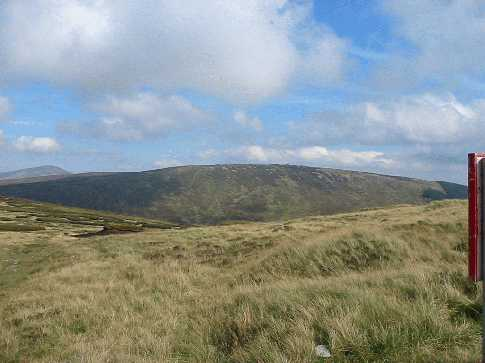
Summit from Table Mountain

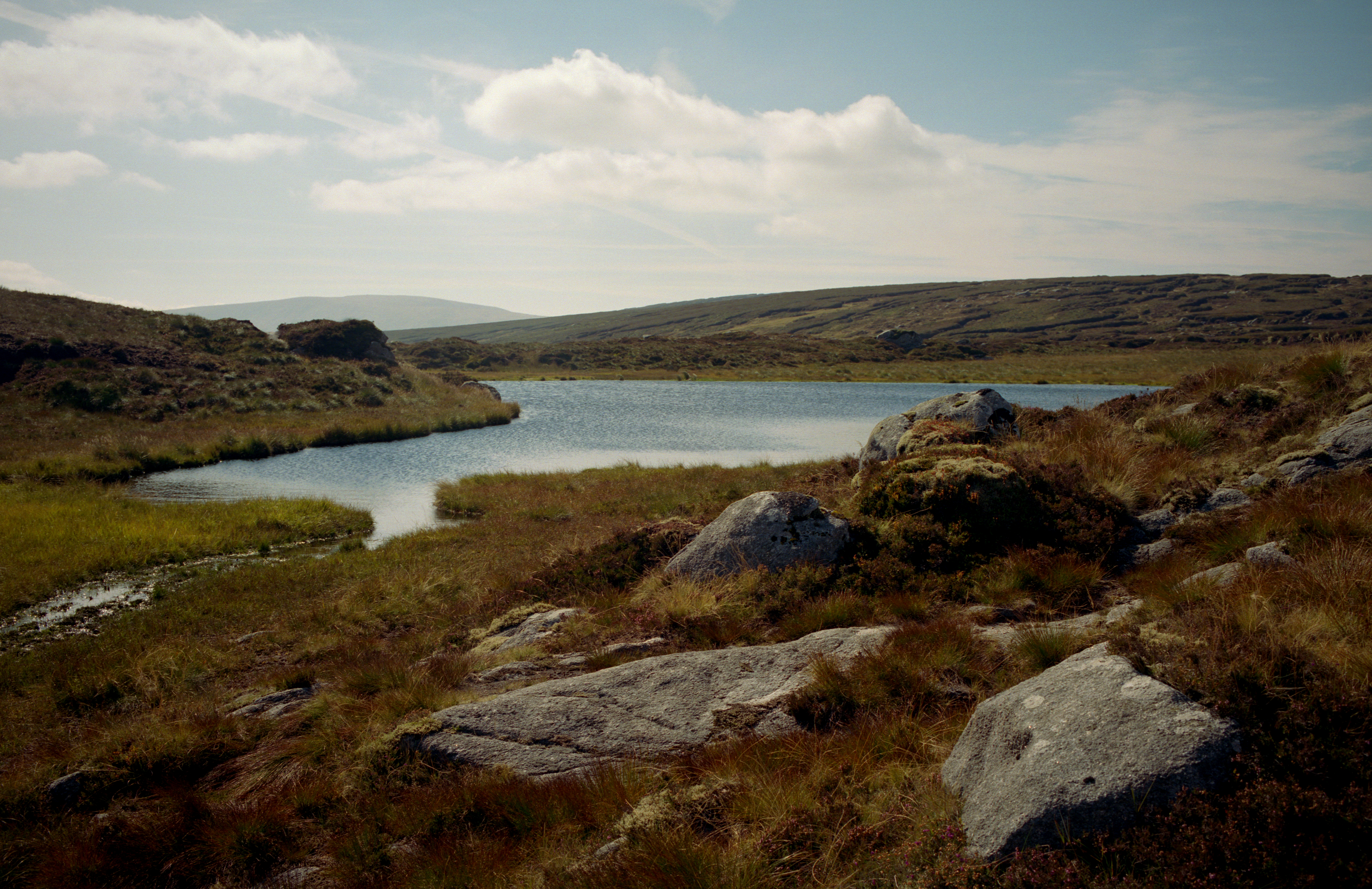
Lough Firrib

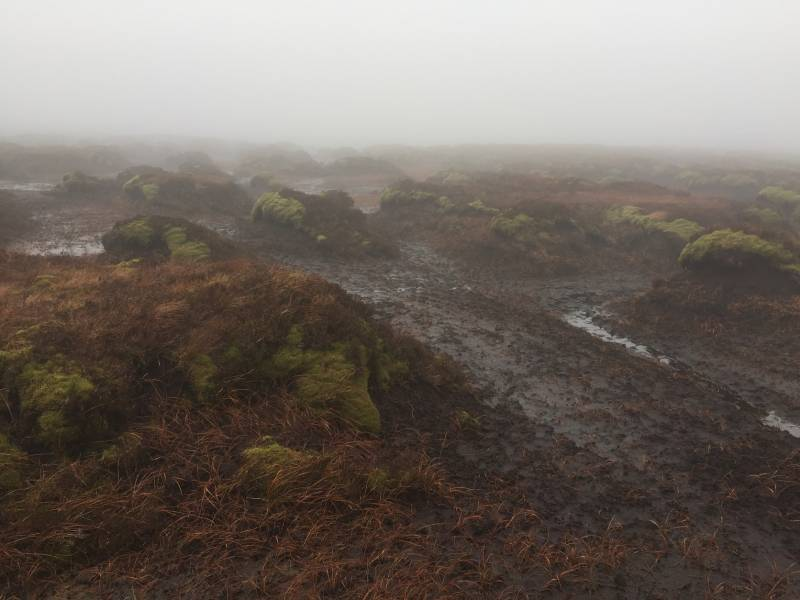
Conavalla Massif

== See also ==
- Wicklow Way
- Wicklow Mountains
- Lists of mountains in Ireland
- List of mountains of the British Isles by height
- List of Hewitt mountains in England, Wales and Ireland
