= William fitz Roger =

Anglo-Norman cleric, judge and official

William fitz Roger (died after 1295) was an Anglo-Norman cleric, judge and Crown official in late thirteenth-century Lordship of Ireland. He was Prior of the Irish House of the Knights Hospitallers at Kilmainham, and served as a Privy Councillor and as a justice in eyre (itinerant judge). He led several military expeditions (the Hospitallers were an order of fighting monks), but was a notoriously incompetent commander, whose campaigns invariably ended in failure. He served as Deputy Justiciar in 1284–85, and as acting Justiciar of Ireland in 1294.

== Early career ==
He is thought to have been a Norman from the Kingdom of England, but little is known of him until 1274, when he was appointed Prior of Kilmainham. There had been a long gap in filling the office: the previous Prior, Henry Kyriell, had died in 1260.

== Glenmalure and afterwards ==
As the head of a great military order, fitz Roger was expected to lead troops in battle, and soon after his appointment he led an expedition against the O'Byrne clan of County Wicklow, who periodically raided Dublin. These raids were always a cause of great concern to the Dublin Government, and the Prior of Kilmainham was one of those entrusted with the city's defences. The expedition was a disastrous failure: most of fitz Roger's forces, including numerous monks, were slaughtered in the valley of Glenmalure in the Wicklow Mountains, and the survivors, including the Prior himself, were taken captive. They were only released after a hostage exchange was arranged by the Justiciar. An Irish historian of the Victorian era commented severely on the unpleasant spectacle of Christian monks fighting their fellow Christians (he did not mention the O'Byrnes' raids on Dublin, which were themselves notoriously bloody affairs).

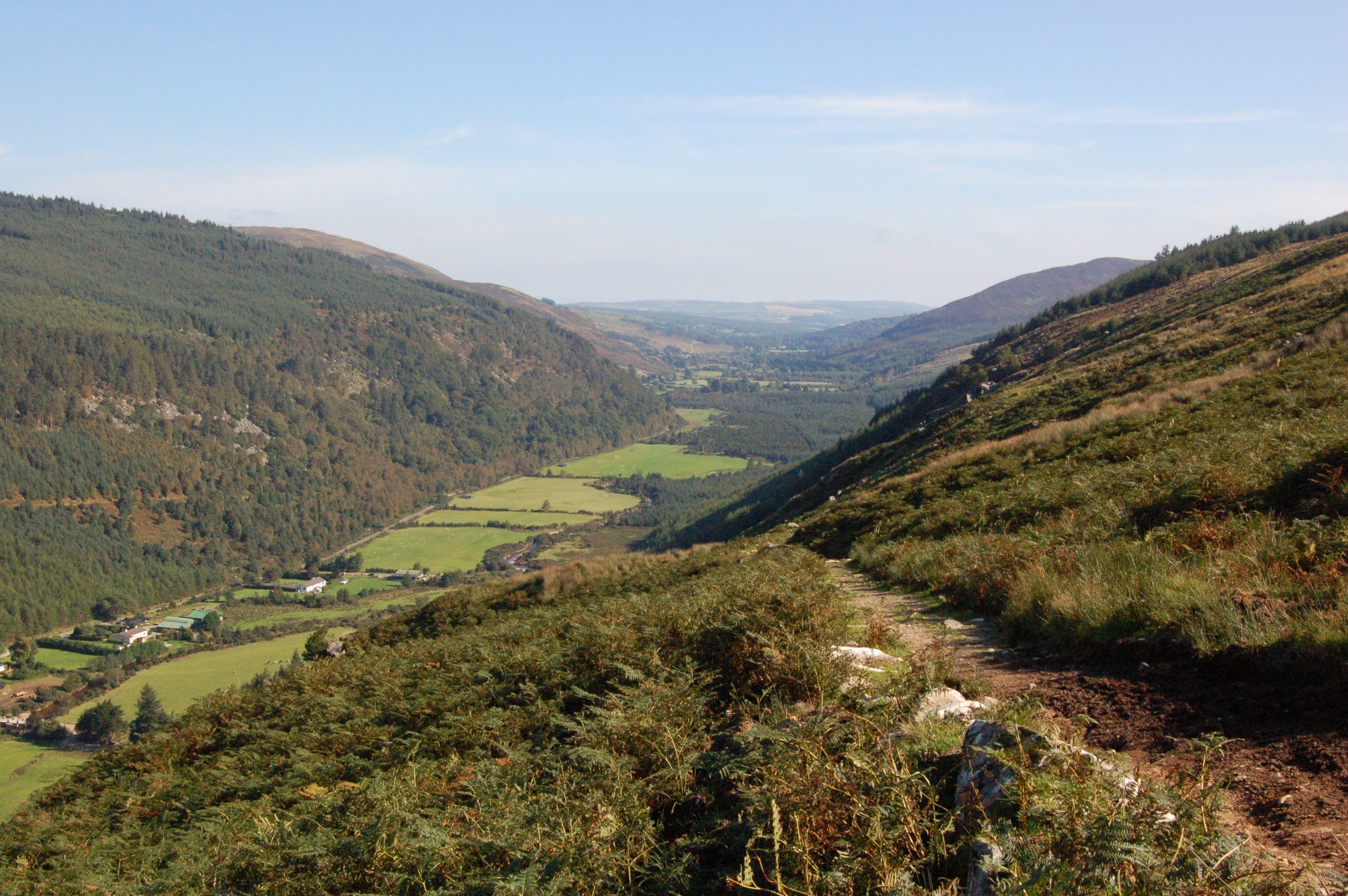
Glenmalure, County Wicklow, the site of a disastrous military defeat suffered by fitz Roger and his monks in 1274

Perhaps understandably, fitz Roger quickly went to England, with the stated intention of going on Crusade. He attempted to resign as Prior, and nominated William de Buries as his successor. His actions brought on him the wrath of the formidable King Edward I of England, who ordered him to return at once to Ireland and resume his duties, and in particular the defence of Dublin. When fitz Roger objected that he had received an express command to go to the Holy Land from Hugues de Revel, the Grand Master of the Knights Hospitallers, the King would have none of it, and threatened to confiscate all the Orders' Irish possessions if fitz Roger did not return. The Prior, faced with this dilemma, evidently felt that the present anger of the King was more to be feared than the displeasure of the Grand Master in faraway Rhodes, and duly returned.

== Later career ==
On his return to Ireland, fitz Roger resumed the Priorship. He also began to play a leading role in Government, the first Prior of Kilmainham to do so: he was a member of the Privy Council of Ireland and an Auditor of the Exchequer of Ireland, and became a justice itinerant in 1278. The King, having successfully asserted his authority over the Prior, confirmed the Priory in all its rights and privileges in 1280. The Prior acted as Deputy Justiciar from 1284 to 1285, and despite his disastrous failure at Glenmalure, he led further military expeditions in County Offaly and County Roscommon. As Lord Deputy he was subject to serious criticism: in particular, he was accused by the city fathers of Cork, in a petition to the King, of excessive leniency in pardoning the outlaw Donal MacCarthy of the MacCarthy dynasty, against their advice.

In 1291–92 he was Chief Justice in eyre (circuit) for Dublin, although the eyre system was rapidly becoming obsolete in Ireland, and he presided at the trial of William Prene, Master of the King's Works in Ireland, who was convicted of extortion and corruption. In 1294 William de Vesci was removed from office as Justiciar for maladministration, and fitz Roger replaced him in an acting capacity. He was also appointed Custos rotulorum (Keeper of the Rolls). In 1295 he is on record as bringing a number of lawsuits to recover property at Corballis and Athcarne, allegedly belonging to the Order. Little is heard of him after 1295, though his successor as Prior, William Ros or de Rosse, was not appointed until 1301.

== Sources ==
- Archdall, Mervyn Monasticon Hibernicum; or a History of the Abbeys, Priories and other Religious Houses of Ireland 3 Volumes W.B. Kelly Dublin 1863
- D'Alton, John History of the County Dublin Hodges and Smith Dublin 1838
- Grace, James Annals of Ireland edited by Reverend Richard Butler Published by the Archaeological Society of Ireland Dublin 1842
- Mackay, Ronan "Fitzroger, William" Cambridge Dictionary of Irish Biography 2009
- Otway-Ruthven, A.J. A History of Medieval Ireland Barnes and Noble reissue New York 1993
