= Camaderry =

Mountain in Wicklow, Ireland

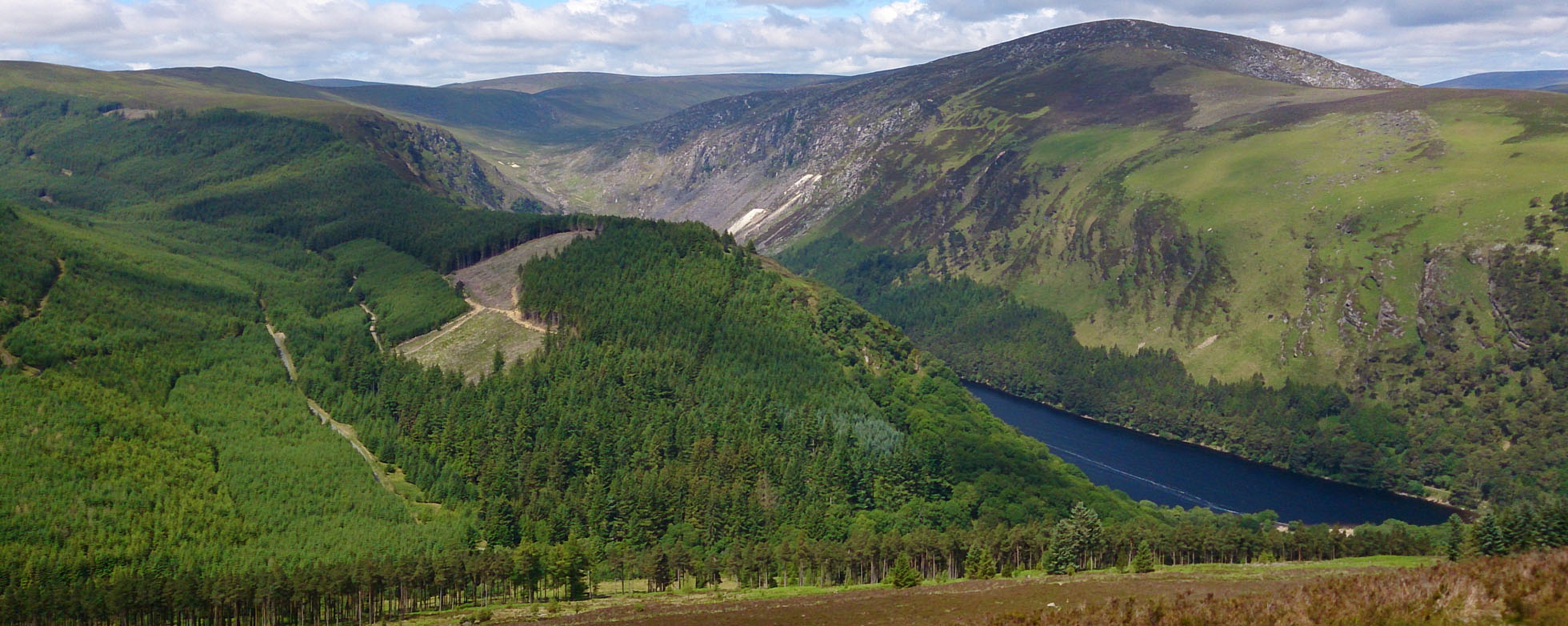
- Camaderry (right) at Glendalough Upper Lake

Highest point
- Elevation: 699 m (2,293 ft)
- Prominence: 71 m (233 ft)
- Listing: Hewitt, Arderin, Simm, Vandeleur-Lynam
- Coordinates: 53°01′28″N 6°22′38″W

Naming
- Native name: Sliabh Céim an Doire
- English translation: step/pass of the oak-wood

Geography
- Location within island of Ireland
- Location: County Wicklow, Ireland
- Parent range: Wicklow Mountains
- OSI/OSNI grid: T081980
- Topo map: OSi Discovery 56

Geology
- Mountain type: Adamellite with microcline phenocrysts

Camaderry (Irish: Sliabh Céim an Doire, meaning 'step/pass of the oak-wood') at 699 metres (2,293 ft), is the 90th-highest peak in Ireland on the Arderin scale, and the 112th-highest peak on the Vandeleur-Lynam scale. Camaderry is situated in the southern sector of the Wicklow Mountains range, and forms a broad horseshoe around the valley of Glendalough with the hydroelectric station at Turlough Hill 681 metres (2,234 ft), and the mountains of Conavalla 734 metres (2,408 ft), and Lugduff 652 metres (2,139 ft). Camaderry has a subsidiary summit, Camaderry South East Top 677 metres (2,221 ft), and both lie across the deep Wicklow Gap from Tonelagee 817 metres (2,680 ft), which sits on the "central spine" of the Wicklow range.

== Lough Nahanagan ==
Between the north face of Camaderry and the east face of Turlough Hill lies Lough Nahanagan (Irish: Loch na hOnchon, meaning 'Lake of the Water Monster'), a deep corrie lake carved by a glacier at the end of the last ice age. The lake is associated with several Irish folk-stories. The cliffs of the corrie around Lough Nahanagan are used by rock-climbers with single-pitch graded routes of up to VS 4c.

== Mining ==
Camaderry mountain contains the Luganure mineral vein which is a source of lead in the form of galena (PbS), and also contains traces of silver. In 1859 the Glendasan and Glendalough mines were connected with each other by a series of tunnels called adits, which are now mostly flooded, through the mountain. After several revivals, mining ceased in Camaderry in 1957; however, remains of the Miner's Village at Glendalough can still be seen.

== Bibliography ==
- Fairbairn, Helen (2014). Dublin & Wicklow: A Walking Guide. Collins Press. ISBN 978-1848892019.
- Fairbairn, Helen (2014). Ireland's Best Walks: A Walking Guide. Collins Press. ISBN 978-1848892118.
- MountainViews Online Database (Simon Stewart) (2013). A Guide to Ireland's Mountain Summits: The Vandeleur-Lynams & the Arderins. Collins Books. ISBN 978-1-84889-164-7.
- Dillion, Paddy (1993). The Mountains of Ireland: A Guide to Walking the Summits. Cicerone. ISBN 978-1852841102.

== Gallery ==
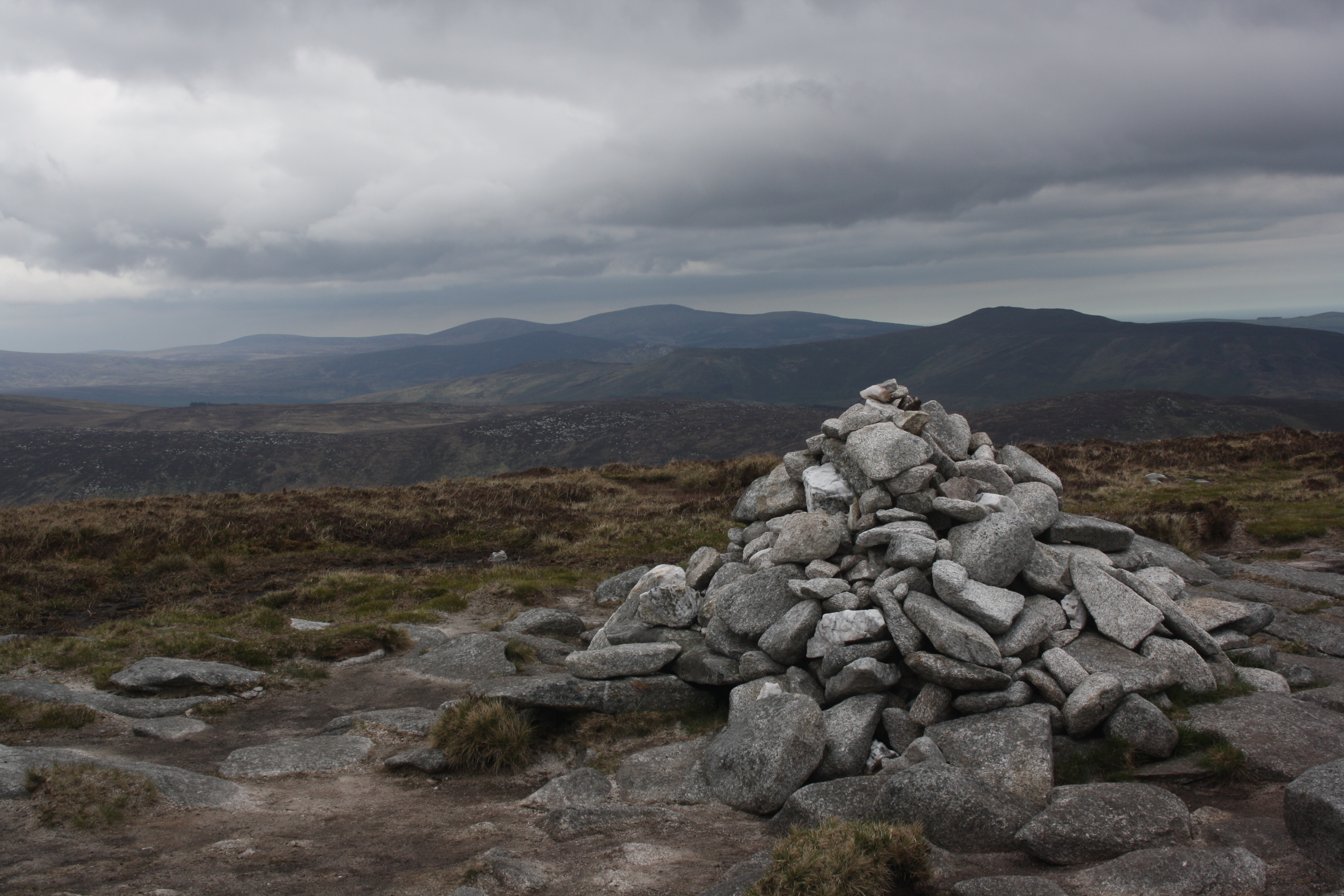
Summit cairn

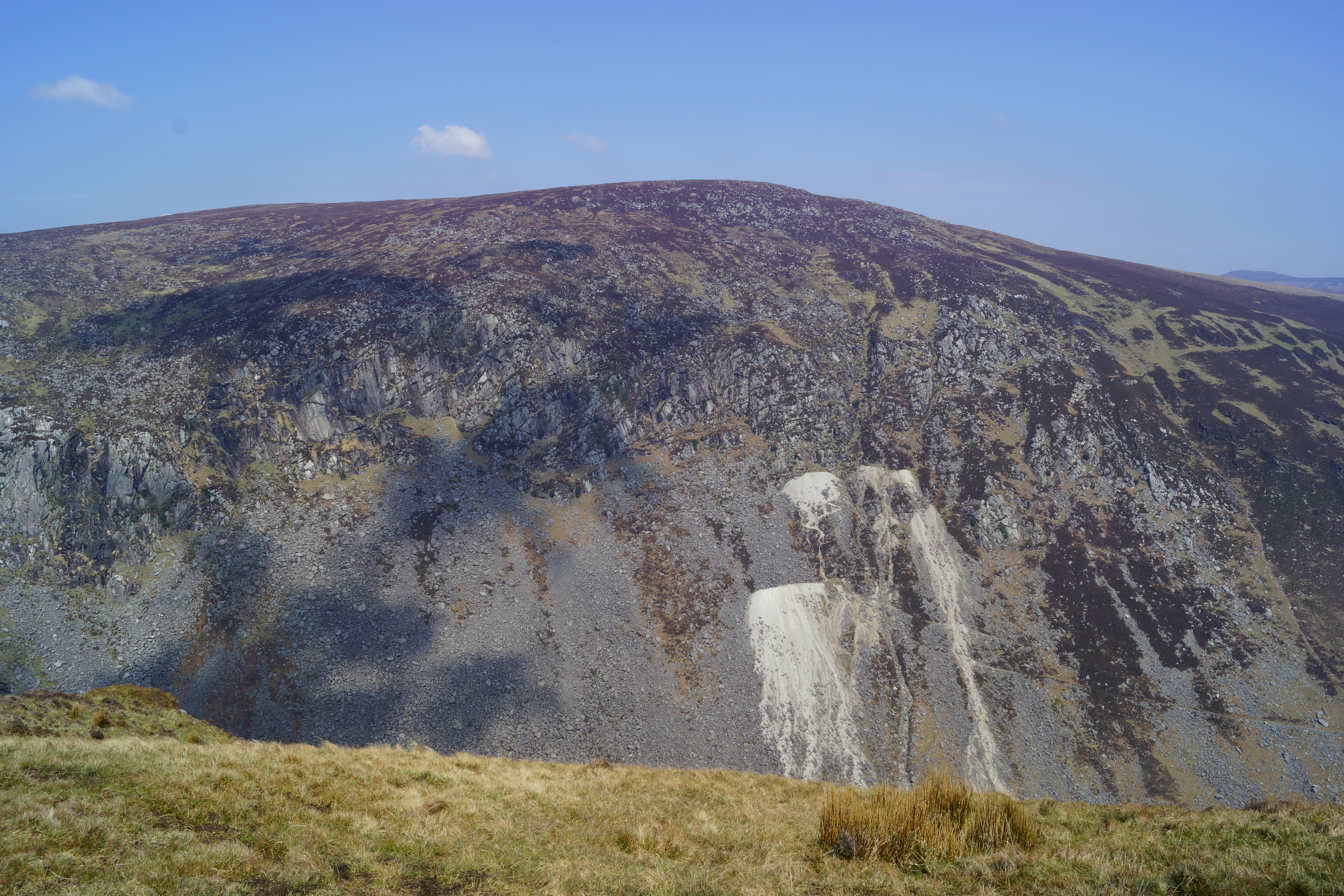
South face from Luggala

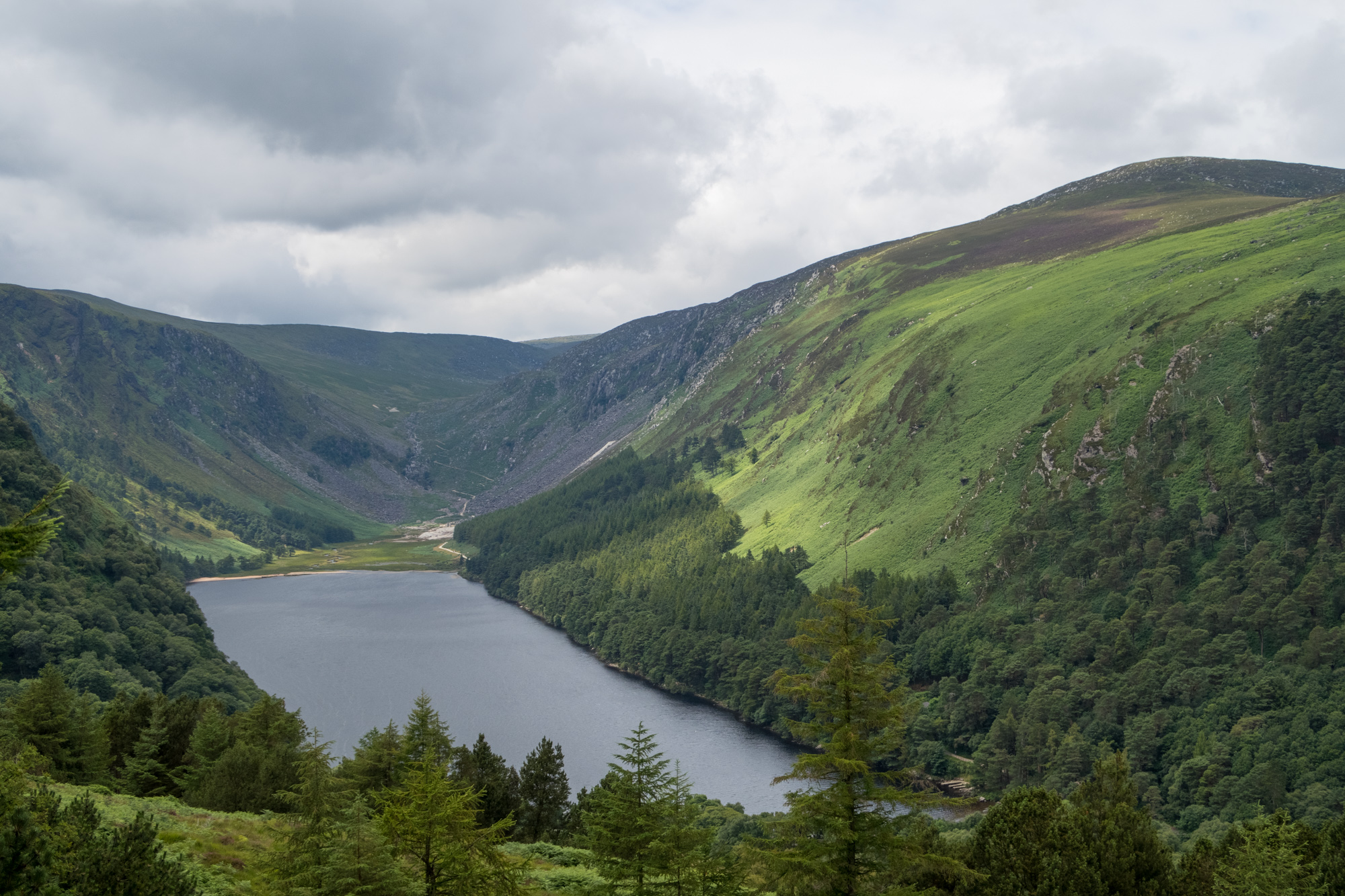
Camaderry (right)

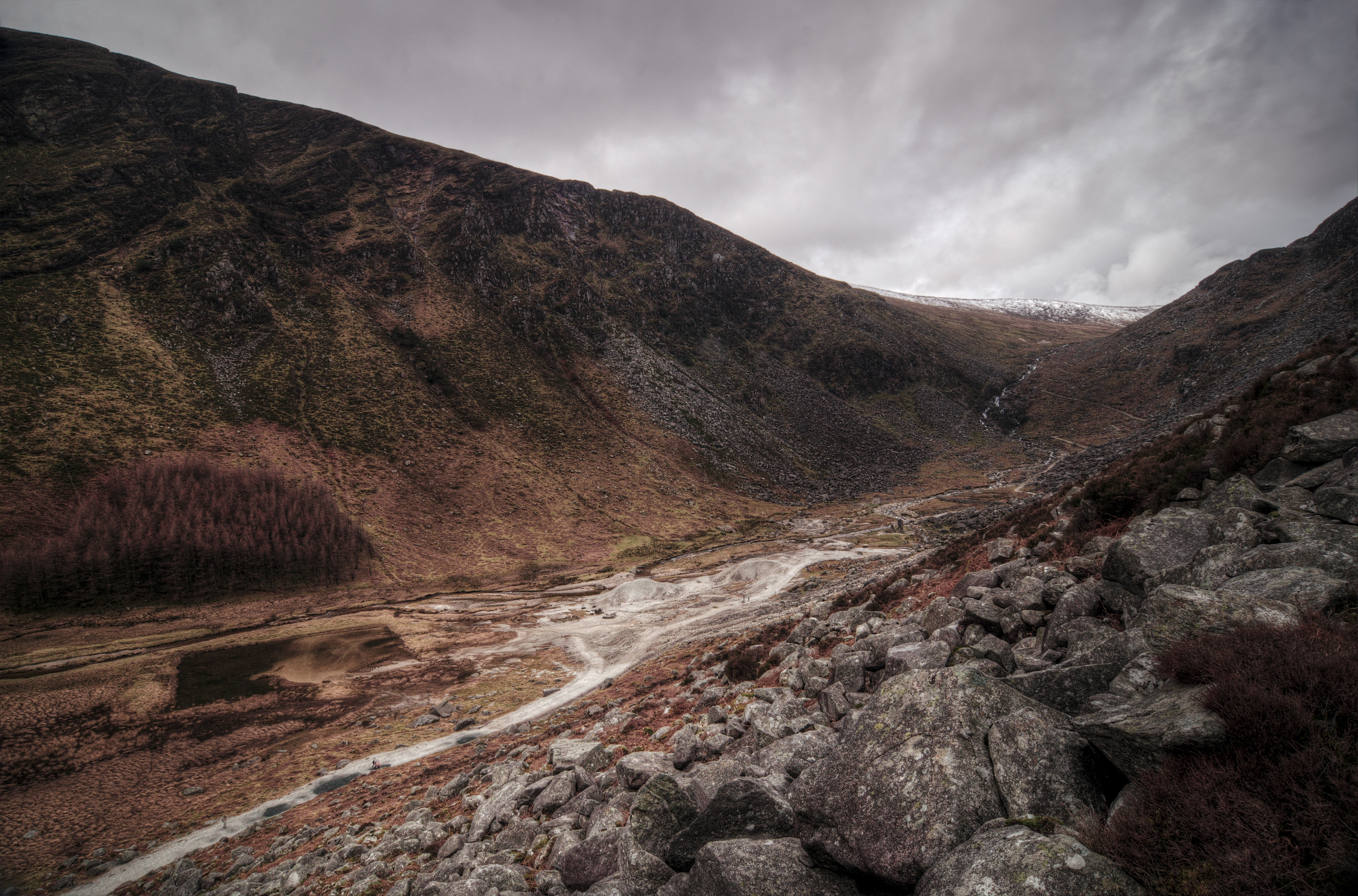
Miner's Village

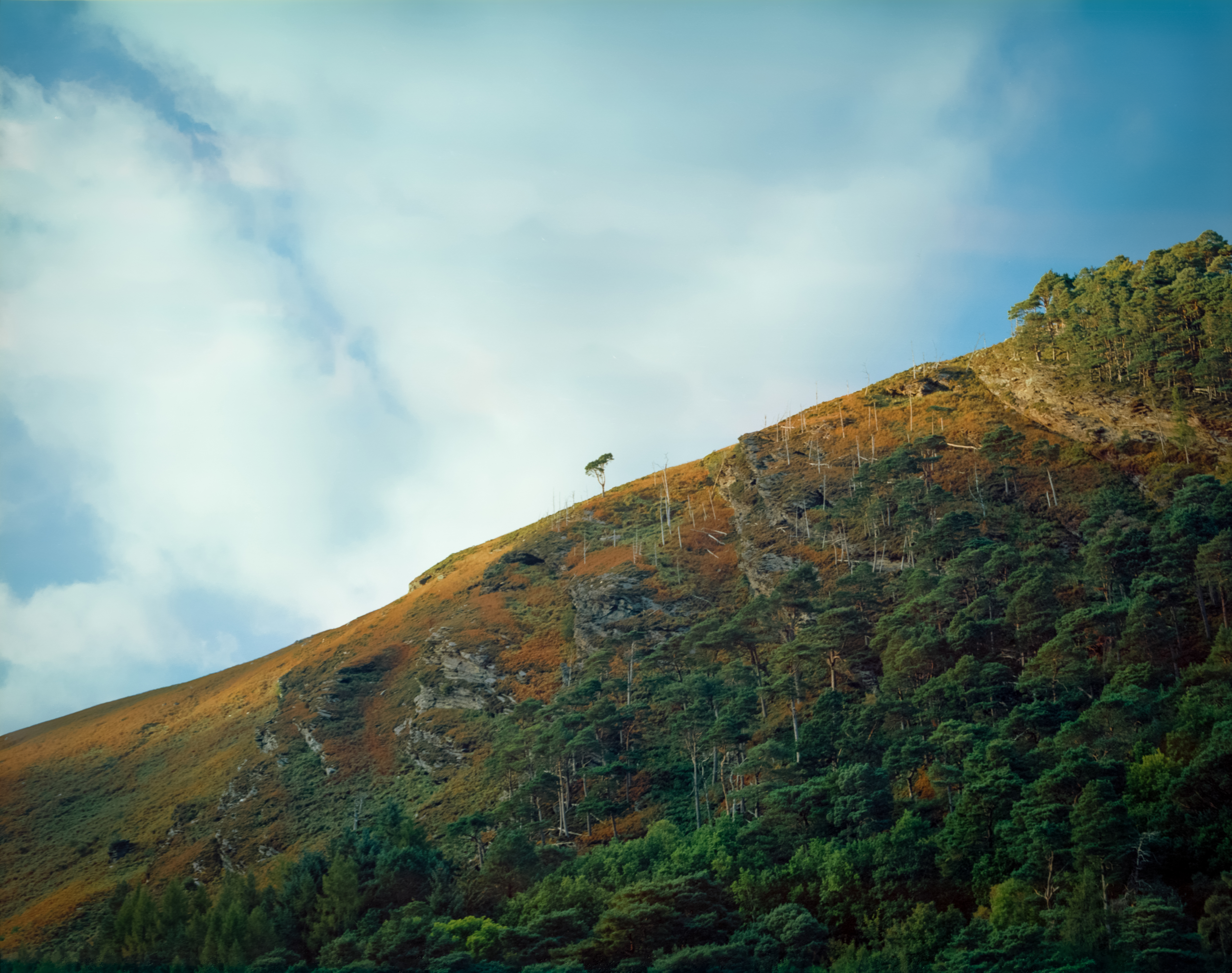
Slopes of SE Top
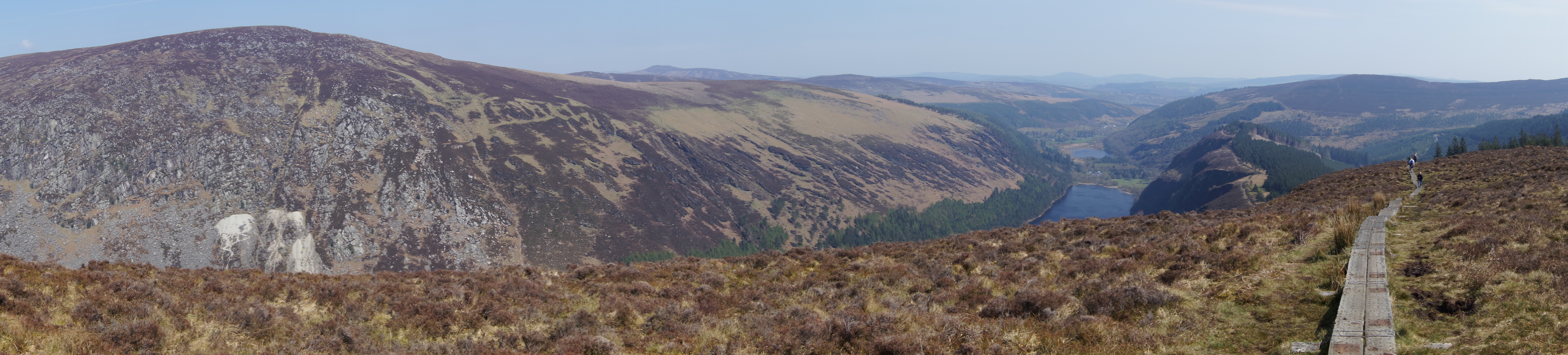
View from Glenealo Valley to Camaderry (left) and into Glendalough with The Spinc outcrop (middle right) and White Trail boardwalk.

== See also ==
- Wicklow Way
- Wicklow Mountains
- Lists of mountains in Ireland
- List of mountains of the British Isles by height
- List of Hewitt mountains in England, Wales and Ireland
