= Camenabologue =

Mountain in County Wicklow, Ireland

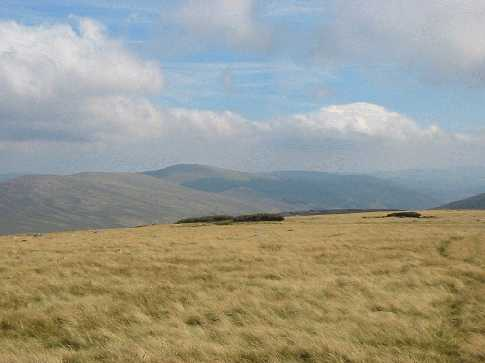
- Camenabologue in the distance

Highest point
- Elevation: 758 m (2,487 ft)
- Prominence: 133 m (436 ft)
- Listing: 100 Highest Irish Mountains, Hewitt, Arderin, Simm, Vandeleur-Lynam
- Coordinates: 53°00′19″N 6°28′36″W

Naming
- Native name: Céim na mBulóg
- English translation: step or pass of the bullocks

Geography
- Location within island of Ireland
- Location: County Wicklow, Ireland
- Parent range: Wicklow Mountains
- OSI/OSNI grid: T0232195992
- Topo map: OSi Discovery 56

Geology
- Mountain type: Aphyric granodiorite

Camenabologue (Irish: Céim na mBulóg, meaning 'step or pass of the bullocks') at 758 metres (2,487 ft), is the 55th–highest peak in Ireland on the Arderin scale, and the 71st–highest peak on the Vandeleur-Lynam scale. Camenabologue is situated in the southern section of the Wicklow Mountains, and has a subsidiary summit, Camenabologue SE Top 663 metres (2,175 ft). Camenabologue forms a horseshoe on a "boggy" massif, at the head of Glenmalure, with its neighbours, that include Table Mountain 702 metres (2,303 ft), and Conavalla 734 metres (2,408 ft). Camenabologue also sits on the main "central spine" of the Wicklow Mountains and links to the larger massif of Lugnaquilla 925 metres (3,035 ft), which lies at the southern terminus of the whole range.

Camenabologue's prominence of 133 metres (436 ft) does not qualify it as a Marilyn, but it does rank it as the 31st-highest mountain in Ireland on the MountainViews Online Database, 100 Highest Irish Mountains, where the minimum prominence threshold is 100 metres.

== Bibliography ==
- Fairbairn, Helen (2014). Dublin & Wicklow: A Walking Guide. Collins Press. ISBN 978-1848892019.
- Fairbairn, Helen (2014). Ireland's Best Walks: A Walking Guide. Collins Press. ISBN 978-1848892118.
- MountainViews Online Database (Simon Stewart) (2013). A Guide to Ireland's Mountain Summits: The Vandeleur-Lynams & the Arderins. Collins Books. ISBN 978-1-84889-164-7.
- Dillion, Paddy (1993). The Mountains of Ireland: A Guide to Walking the Summits. Cicerone. ISBN 978-1852841102.

== See also ==
- Wicklow Way
- Wicklow Round
- Wicklow Mountains
- Lists of mountains in Ireland
- List of mountains of the British Isles by height
- List of Hewitt mountains in England, Wales and Ireland
