= Turlough Hill =

Mountain and hydroelectric plant in Wicklow, Ireland

Turlough Hill (Cnoc an Turlaigh)
- Tomaneena (Tuaim an Aonaigh)
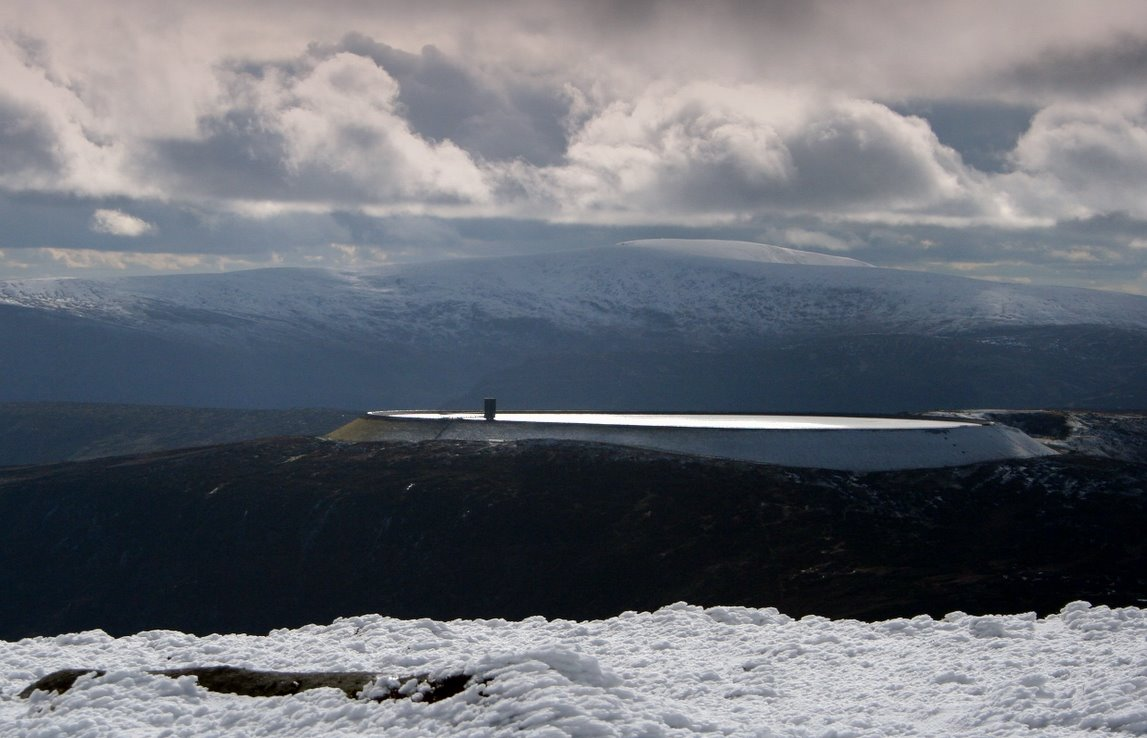
- The upper reservoir on Turlough Hill, viewed from Tonelagee

Highest point
- Elevation: 681 m (2,234 ft)
- Prominence: 54 m (177 ft)
- Coordinates: 53°01′27″N 6°24′59″W

Geography
- Location within island of Ireland
- Location: County Wicklow, Ireland
- Parent range: Wicklow Mountains
- OSI/OSNI grid: T063982
- Topo map: OSI Discovery No. 56

Climbing
- Easiest route: Access road to north of summit

Turlough Hill (Irish: Cnoc an Turlaigh, meaning 'Hill of the Turlach'), also known as Tomaneena (Irish: Tuaim an Aonaigh, meaning 'mound of the assembly/fair'), is a 681-metre-high (2,234 ft) mountain in County Wicklow in Ireland and site of Ireland's only pumped-storage hydroelectricity plant. The power station is owned and operated by the ESB and can generate up to 292 megawatts (392,000 hp) of electricity at times of peak demand.

== The mountain ==
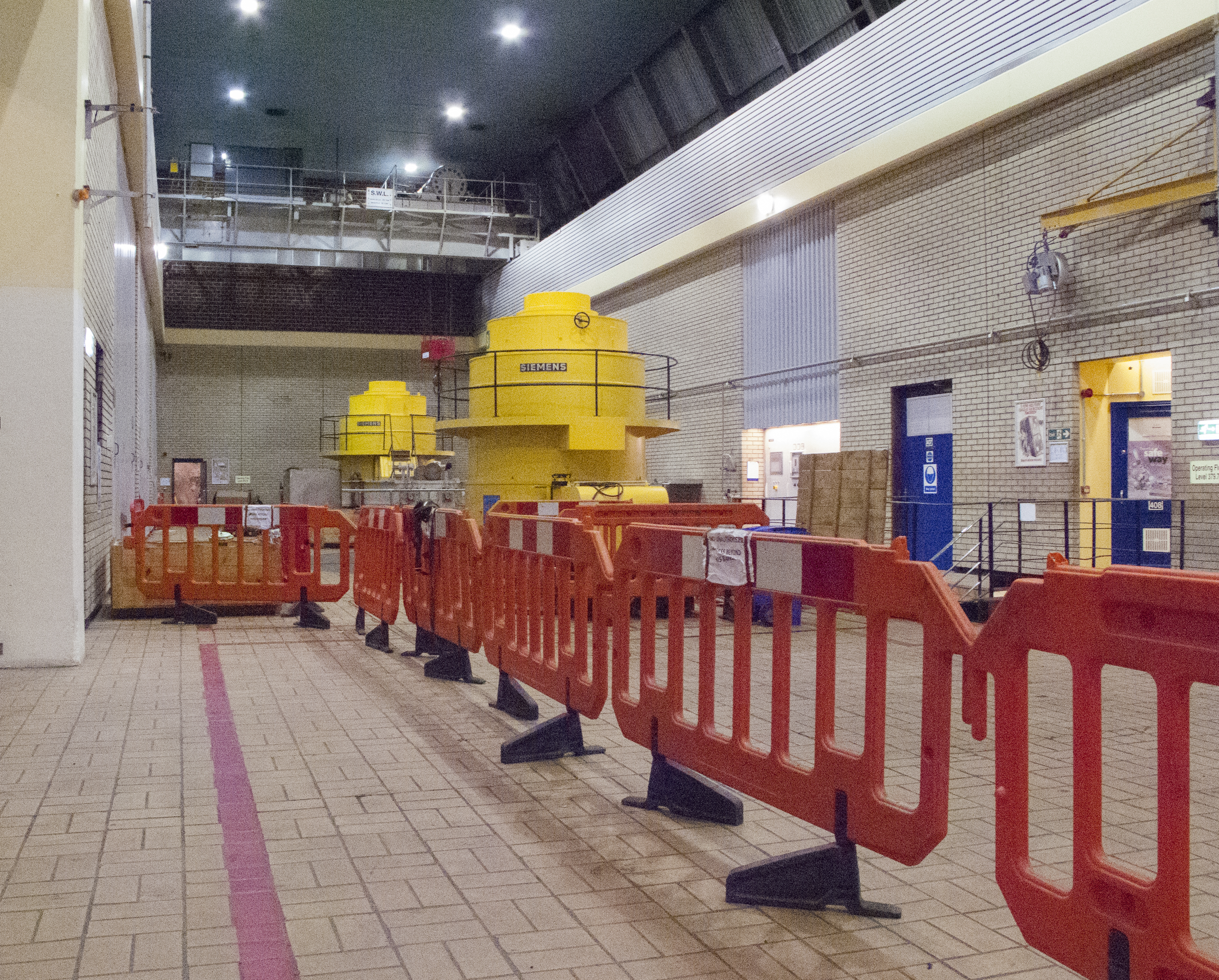
A photo of the Generator Hall in 2014

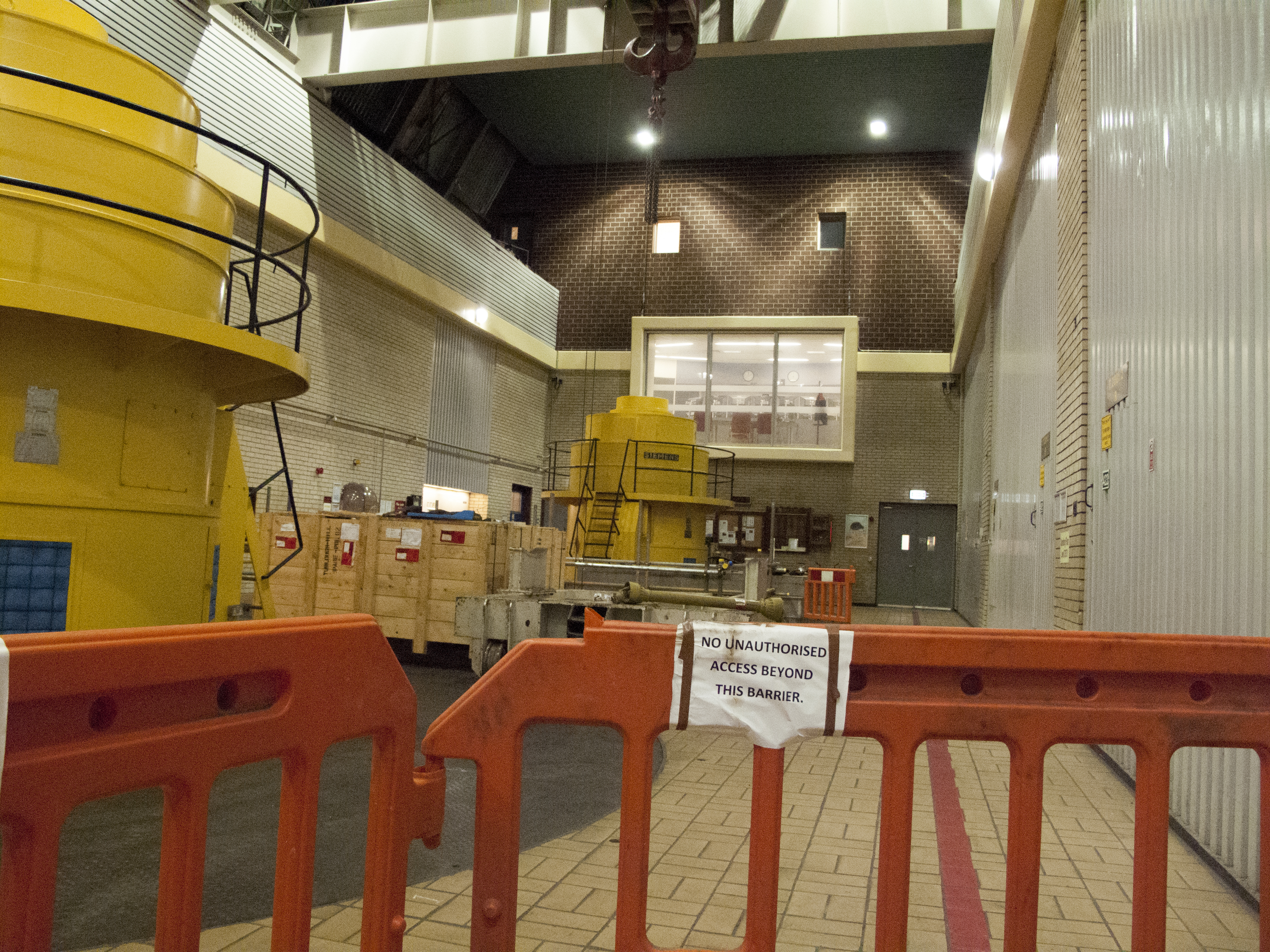
Another photo of the Generator Hall

The historian Liam Price recorded that the mountain was known locally as Tomaneena; Turlough Hill is the name given to it by the ESB when they surveyed the site for the pumped-storage scheme. It is 681 metres (2,234 ft) high and is the 136th highest summit in Ireland. The summit is located to the south-west of the upper reservoir and is easily reached via the tarmac access road that begins at the top of the Wicklow Gap. It is also possible to reach the summit from Glendalough or from the summits of neighbouring Camaderry and Conavalla mountains.

The underlying geology of the mountain is granite, covered with blanket bog, which is a habitat for heather, purple moor grass and sphagnum moss. A number of alpine plants grow near the summit: dwarf willow, cowberry, crowberry, fir clubmoss and common bilberry. To the north-east of the summit, at the head of Glendasan valley, is Lough Nahanagan (Irish: Loch na hOnchon, meaning 'Lake of the Water Monster'), a corrie lake carved by a glacier at the end of the last ice age.

== The pumped-storage scheme ==
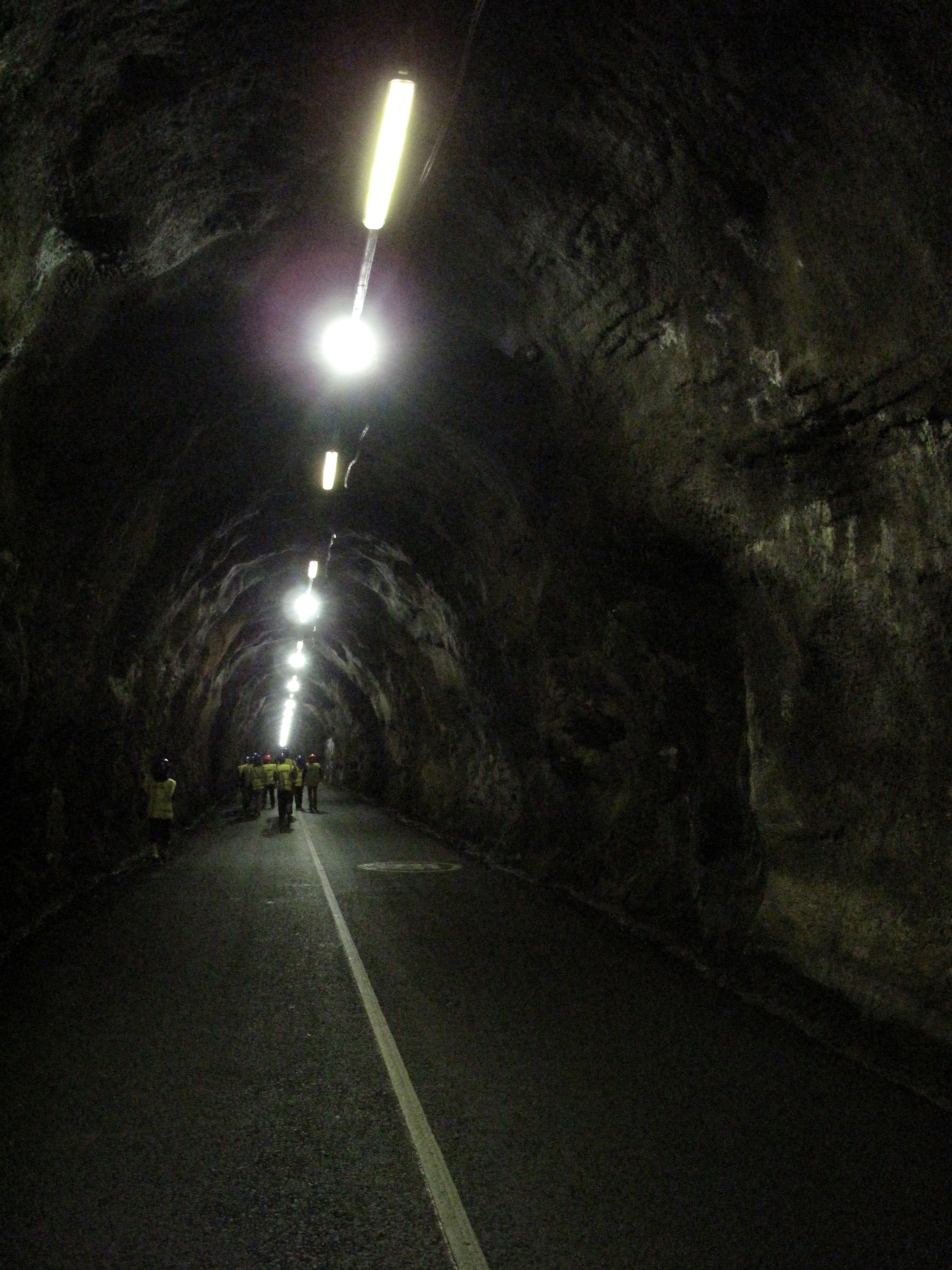
Access Tunnel

The Turlough Hill Power Station is owned and operated by the Electricity Supply Board (ESB). Construction commenced in 1968, and the station became fully operational in 1974.

== Name ==
The mountain is also known as Tomaneena. MountainViews lists the Irish form as possibly Tuaim an Aonaigh, meaning "mound of the fair", and describes Turlough Hill as an additional English name. Before construction of the pumped-storage scheme, the hill overlooking Lough Nahanagan was not named on the Ordnance Survey map. J. O'Riordan, the ESB engineer who carried out the original survey and recommended the site, named the hill after his son, Turlough. The similarity between the name and the Irish term turlough, meaning a dry lake, was coincidental.

== Bibliography ==
- Corlett, Christiaan; Weaver, Mairéad, eds. (2002). The Liam Price Notebooks: The Placenames, Antiquities and Topography of Co. Wicklow. Vol. 1. Dublin: Dúchas. ISBN 0-7557-1284-6.
- Department of Communications, Energy and Natural Resources (2010). "National Renewable Energy Action Plan" (PDF). Archived from the original (PDF) on 16 October 2011.
- Dillon, Paddy (1993). The Mountains of Ireland. Milnthorpe: Cicerone Press. ISBN 978-1-85284-110-2.
