= Avoca =

Avoca may refer to:

== Places ==
=== Australia ===
- Avoca, New South Wales
- Avoca Beach, New South Wales
  - Avoca Lake, New South Wales
- North Avoca, New South Wales
- Avoca, Tasmania
- Avoca, Queensland, a suburb of Bundaberg
- Avoca, Victoria
  - Avoca River, Victoria
- Avoca Dell, South Australia, on the northeastern outskirts of Murray Bridge

=== Canada ===
- Avoca Ravine, Toronto, Ontario
- Avoca, Quebec

=== Ireland ===
- Avoca, County Wicklow, the village
- River Avoca, in County Wicklow

=== New Zealand ===
- Avoca, New Zealand, a locality in the Canterbury Region
- Avoca River (Canterbury)
- Avoca River (Hawke's Bay)

=== South Africa ===
- Avoca, Durban, a suburb in KwaZulu-Natal

=== United States ===
- Avoca, Arkansas
- Avoca, Florida, an unincorporated community in Hamilton County
- Avoca Township, Livingston County, Illinois
- Avoca, Indiana
- Avoca, Iowa
- Avoca, Louisville, Kentucky
- Avoca in Kenockee Township, Michigan
- Avoca, Minnesota
- Avoca, Nebraska
- Avoca, New York
  - Avoca (village), New York
- Avoca Township, Pottawatomie County, Oklahoma
  - Avoca, Oklahoma, a former small town in Avoca Township
- Avoca, Pennsylvania
- Avoca, Texas
- Avoca (Altavista, Virginia), a historic home in Campbell County
- Avoca, West Virginia
- Avoca, Wisconsin

== Other uses ==
- Avoca Handweavers, an Irish clothing manufacturing, retail and food business
- Avoca Hockey Club, a field hockey club in Dublin, Ireland
- Avoca railway station, a closed station in Victoria, Australia
- Avoca railway station (Ireland), a closed station in County Wicklow

== See also ==
- Vale of Avoca (disambiguation)
