= Asher Independent School District =

School district in Oklahoma

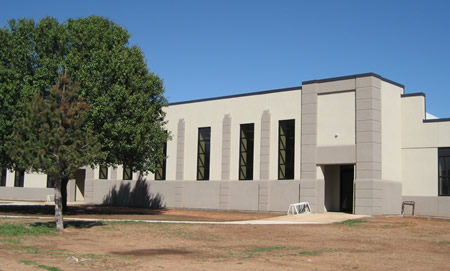
- Asher School following renovation.

Location
- Asher, Oklahoma United States

District information
- Type: Public
- Motto: "Take the t off can't and say I can."
- Grades: Pre-k thru 12th
- Superintendent: Jason Alsup

Students and staff
- Students: 250
- Colors: Navy blue and white

Other information
- Website: www.asher.k12.ok.us

The Asher Independent School District, also known as Asher Public Schools, is a school district based in Asher, Oklahoma, United States. It contains an elementary school, a middle school, and a high school. The district-wide mascot is the Indians.

The district includes Asher. The district, mostly in Pottawatomie County, extends into McClain and Pontotoc counties.

== Brief history ==
Asher Public Schools is an independent school district. It has an elementary school (grades Pre-K to 8) and a high school (grades 9 to 12). The school was established in 1903. In 1913, there were four other school districts within three miles (5 km) of Asher—Clover Dale, Gravel Hill, Avoca, and Pleasant Hill. The schools were small, consisting of only a room or two. Basic facilities were at a minimum. Talk began of consolidating all of the schools into the Asher district. This was later accomplished, presumably around the time Asher's new school building was built in 1929.

== Original building ==
Asher Schools' main and original building (after consolidation) was constructed in 1929. The building would later receive two additions, to either end. The center of the facility originally served as the schools' gym, before being converted to an auditorium when a new gym was built in the 1940s. An extensive renovation was completed in late 2006 on the original building. The work was made possible by a $1.295 million bond issue that was approved by residents in February 2005.

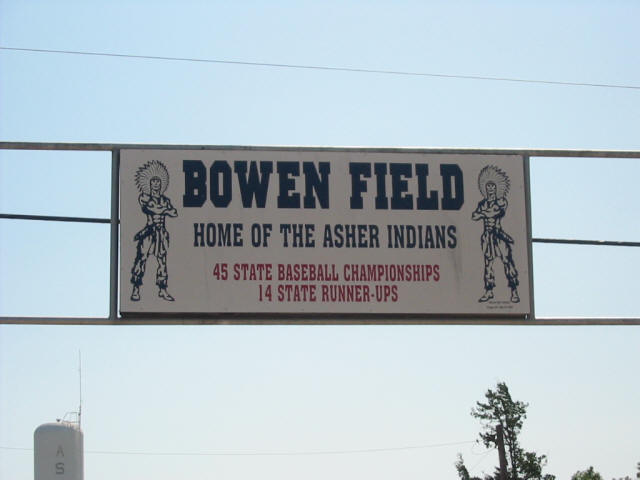
Bowen Field Sign

== Extracurricular activities ==
Asher School, the Indians, participates in baseball, softball and men and women's basketball. For forty years, from 1959 to 1999, Asher had the winningest high school baseball team in the nation, led by head coach Murl Bowen. In those forty years, Asher won 2,115 games, lost only 349, hauled home forty-five state championship trophies and fourteen state runners-up, and sent dozens of players to college and minor-league baseball. No high school in history, public or private, has won as many games as the Asher Indians.

The baseball field in Asher was named after Bowen for his accomplishments with the team. Bowen has since retired, but continues to attend the school's basketball games and boys' baseball games. John Grisham's The Innocent Man: Murder and Injustice in a Small Town mentions former death penalty convict Ron Williamson's time with the Asher Indians as a ballplayer, from which he eventually moved to Minor League Baseball as a prospect for the major leagues before being falsely convicted of murder. Bowen spoke to Grisham about Williamson's exploits with the team; Grisham also cited regular newspaper stories about Williamson's time on the team.

Asher also has chapters of the Business Professionals of America (BPA), Family, Career, and Community Leaders of America (FCCLA) and the National FFA Organization (FFA). Asher 4-H and FFA regularly captures the top sheep honors at livestock shows.

== See also ==
- List of school districts in Oklahoma
