= Avoca Township =

Avoca Township may refer to the following townships in the United States:

- Avoca Township, Livingston County, Illinois
- Avoca Township, Pottawatomie County, Oklahoma
