= R747 road (Ireland) =

Regional road in Ireland

Coordinates: 52°50′59″N 6°18′21″W

The R747 road is a regional road in Ireland running north-west/south-east from the M9 near Ballitore in County Kildare to Arklow in County Wicklow, a distance of 66 km (41 mi).

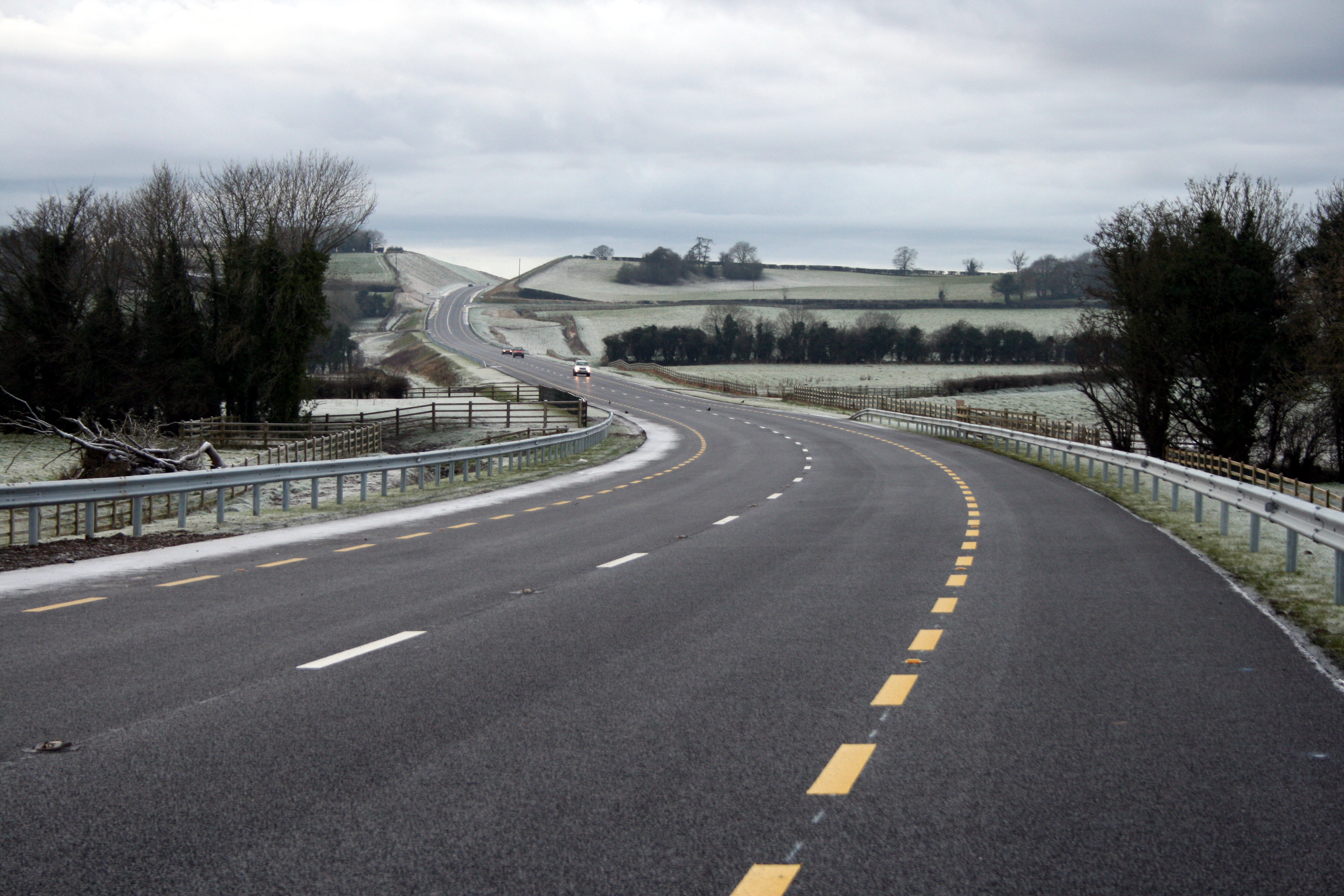
R747 extension opened on 20 December 2009

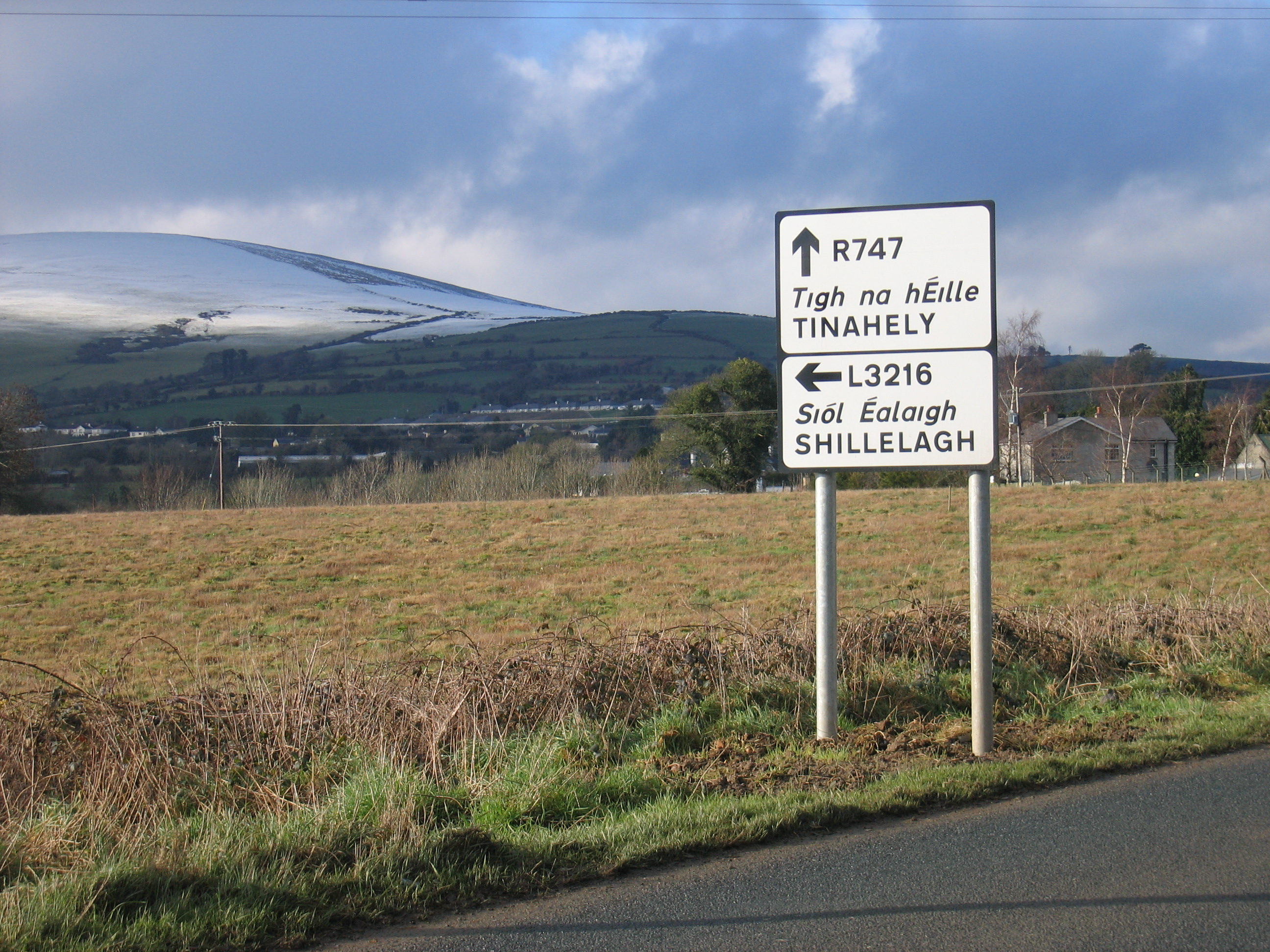
The R747 road Clickable image: click a sign to go to its destination article

From its junction with the M9 it heads east to the former N9. It crosses this at a staggered junction and enters County Wicklow almost immediately and 10 km (6.2 mi) southeast it crosses the N81 in the town of Baltinglass. It continues southeast through Kiltegan before crossing into County Carlow for a short distance where it passes through Hacketstown. Back in County Wicklow it crosses the Wicklow Way and enters the southern end of the Wicklow Mountains near Tinahely.

From Tinahely it heads northwest for 14 km (8.7 mi) to Aughrim, and then east along the valley of Aughrim River to Woodenbridge where it is joined by the R752. The final leg of its eastward route is through the valley of the River Avoca which takes it under (though not connecting to) the N11 before terminating in the centre of Arklow.

The official description of the R747 from the Roads Act 1993 (Classification of Regional Roads) Order 2012 reads:

R747: Mullamast, County Kildare — Hacketstown, County Carlow - Arklow, County Wicklow

Between its junction with M9 at Mullamast and its junction with R448 at Timolin via Ballitore all in the county of Kildare

and

between its junction with R448 at Timolin in the county of Kildare and its junction with R772 at Upper Main Street in the town of Arklow via Portersize Cross in the county of Kildare: Ballycore Bridge at the boundary between the county of Kildare and the county of Wicklow: Rathtoole, Tinoranhill; Belan Street, Main Street, Market Square and Weaver Square at Baltinglass; Woodfield, Barraderry West and Kiltegan in the county of Wicklow: Kiltegan Bridge at the boundary between the county of Wicklow and the county of Carlow: Tinnaclash in the county of Carlow: Borkill More in the county of Wicklow: Porchavodda; Bridge Lane and Main Street at Hacketstown in the county of Carlow: Ballinagilky Bridge at the boundary between the county of Carlow and the county of Wicklow: Bridgeland; Main Street at Tinahely; Lugduff, Killaveny, Mucklagh, Kilpipe, Killarcloran, Coates Bridge, Templelusk, Woodenbridge, Glenart, Ballyraine Lower and Yardland in the county of Wicklow: and Vale Road in the town of Arklow.

== R747 extension ==
As part of the construction of the M9 motorway from Kilcullen to Waterford the R747 was extended westwards by 2 km from the old N9/R747 junction to Junction 3 of the motorway. Both the Kilcullen - Carlow section of the M9 and the R747 extension opened on 20 December 2009. A link road from this interchange to Athy was opened in December 2009.

== See also ==
- Roads in Ireland
- National primary road
- National secondary road
