= Woodenbridge =

Village in County Wicklow, Ireland

Woodenbridge An Droichead Adhmaid
- Village
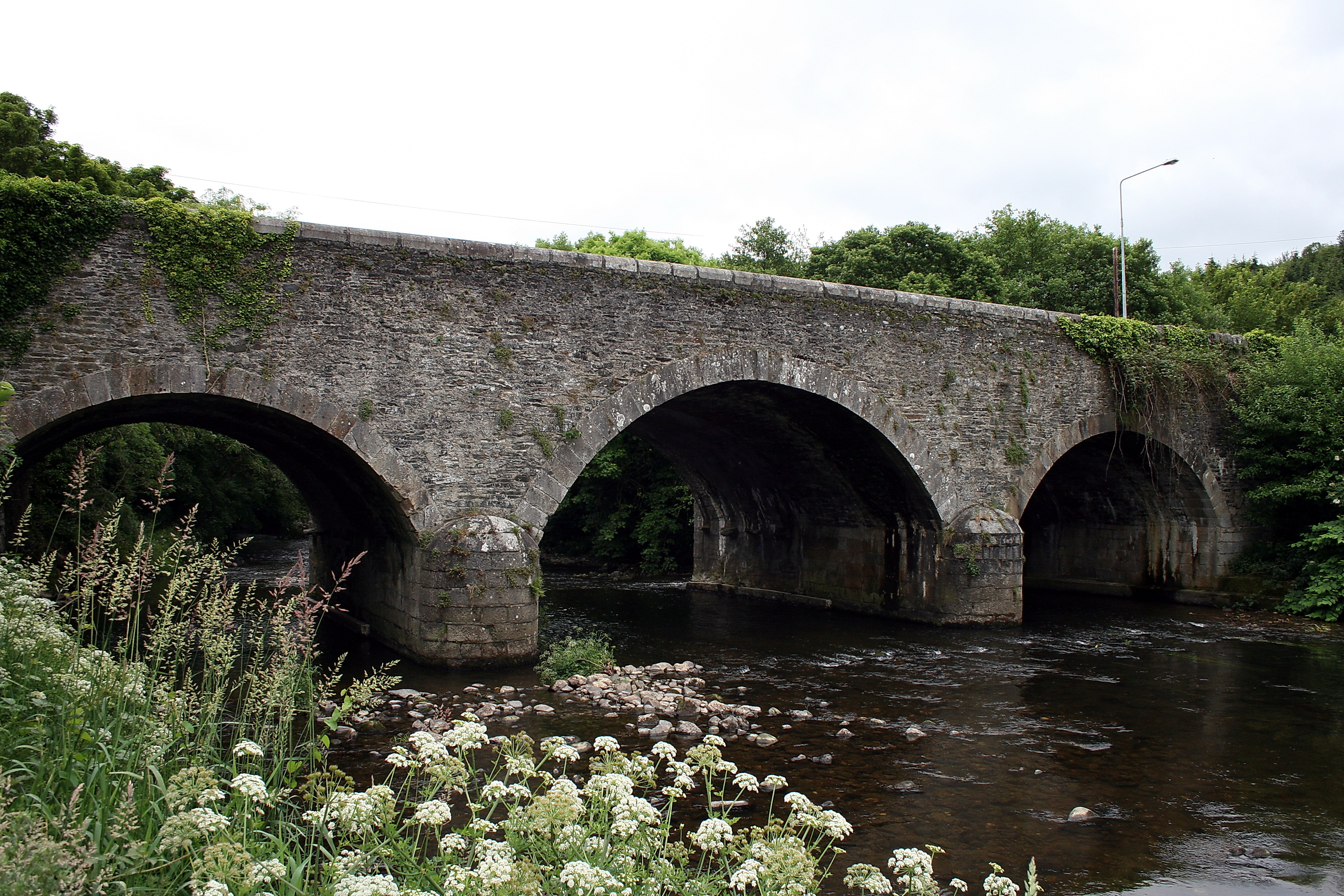
- The R747 over the Aughrim River, the former "Woodenbridge"

- Location in Ireland
- Coordinates: 52°50′05″N 6°14′40″W
- Country: Ireland
- Province: Leinster
- County: County Wicklow
- Elevation: 25 m (82 ft)
- Time zone: UTC+0 (WET)
  - Summer (DST): UTC-1 (IST (WEST))

Woodenbridge (Irish: an Droichead Adhmaid) is a small village in County Wicklow, Ireland. It lies between Arklow and Avoca, at the meeting of the Avoca, Aughrim and Goldmine rivers. The village is located at the junction of the R747 and R752 roads. The R747 crosses the Aughrim on the stone bridge which is still called "Wooden Bridge".

== Name ==
The village was historically called Garrynagowlan, Garragowlan and Garnagowlan (from Irish Garrán an Ghabhláin, meaning 'grove of the little forks') after the townland it occupies.

== Amenities ==
Woodenbridge Golf Course is located here, as are two hotels. The entire golf course was flooded to a depth of several feet during Hurricane Charley in August 1986, which also destroyed a number of bridges over the River Avoca and its tributaries.

== Woodenbridge Hotel ==
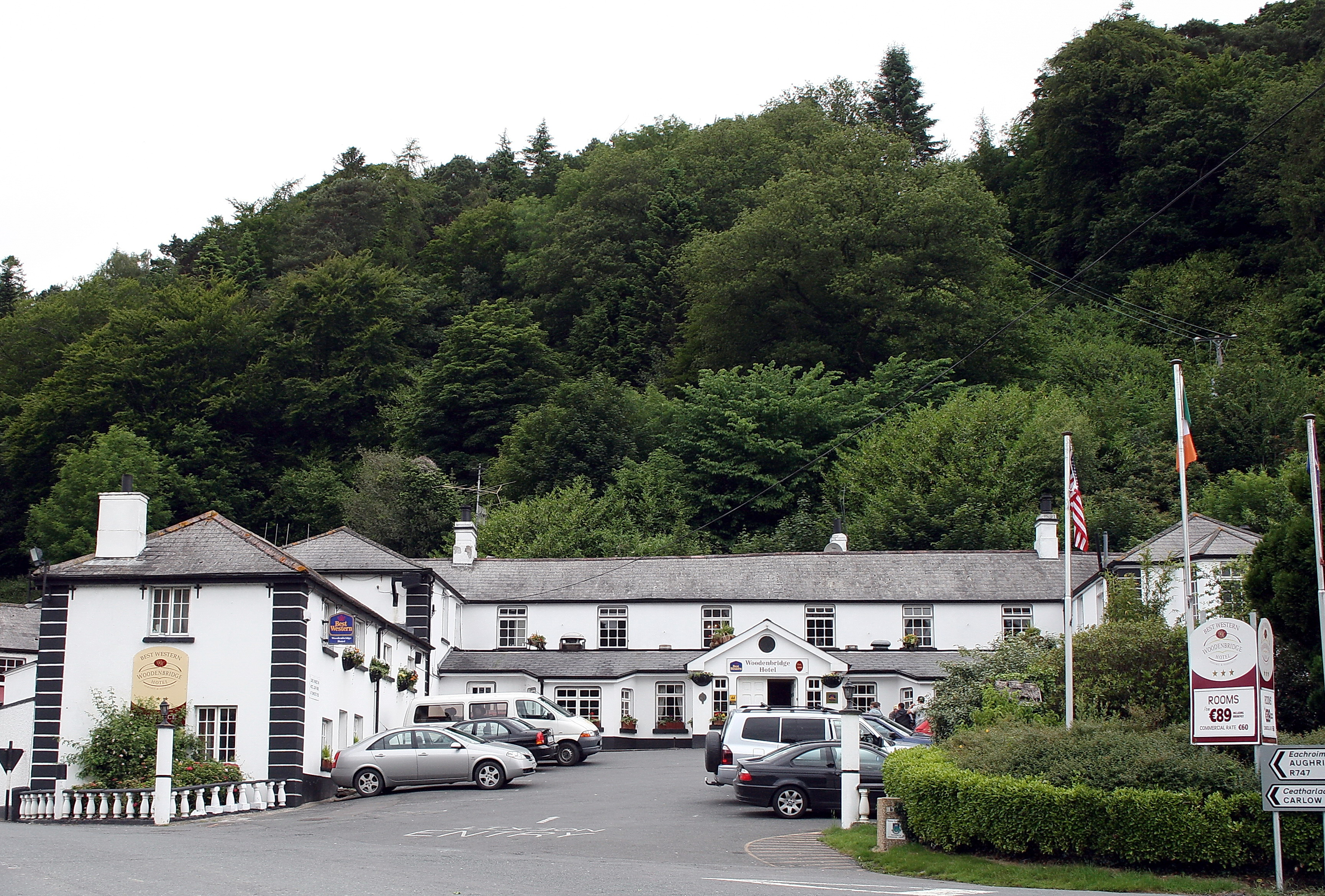
Woodenbridge Hotel originally dates from 1608

The Woodenbridge Hotel & Lodge was established in 1608. Future Taoiseach and President Éamon de Valera and Sinéad de Valera stayed at the hotel on their honeymoon in 1910. The restaurant at the hotel is named the Goldmines Bistro after the Goldmines River and Wicklow gold rush of 1795.

== Transport ==
The remains of an abandoned railway station on the mainline railway between Dublin and Rosslare Harbour can be seen beside the golf course. Woodenbridge railway station opened on 22 May 1865 and finally closed on 30 March 1964. Bus Éireann route 133 serves Woodenbridge four times a day on weekdays and twice on Sundays linking it to Arklow, Avoca, Rathdrum, Wicklow and Dublin.

== First World War ==
At Woodenbridge on 24 September 1914, John Redmond, the leader of the Irish Parliamentary Party, addressed a muster of the Irish Volunteers, exhorting them to join the British Army. This precipitated a split between the majority "National Volunteers" who supported Redmond and of whom many enlisted, and the rump "Irish Volunteers", influenced by the Irish Republican Brotherhood, which led the Easter Rising and evolved into the Irish Republican Army.

== See also ==
- List of towns and villages in Ireland
