= Emily Wynne =

- Born: Emily Adelaide Wynne; 1872; Germany
- Died: 12 June 1958 (aged 85–86); Tigroney House, Avoca, County Wicklow, Ireland

Emily Wynne (1872 – 12 June 1958) was an Irish textile artist at Avoca Woollen Mills and author.

== Early life and family ==
Emily Adelaide Wynne was born in Germany in 1872. Her parents were Albert Augustus Wynne, a civil and mining engineer, and Alice Katherine (née Wynne). She was the eldest of five children, with three sisters, Winifred Frances (1873–1969), and Alice Clara 'Veronica' (1890–1969), and two brothers John Brian (1877–1977) known as Jack and Charles (1895–1917). The Wynne family were originally from Hazelwood or Annagh, County Sligo, and were related to Dr Kathleen Lynn and Constance Markievicz. Their family home was the Georgian Tigroney House, beside the Avoca Woollen Mills in the village of Avoca, County Wicklow. Along with his brother, Wyndham, their father held mining interests in Germany, with the family frequently visiting the country. While their parents traveled, the children would stay with their great aunts, Clara (Aunt Gigi) and Frances (Aunt Fanny), at Corris House in Bagnalstown, County Carlow.

== Career ==
Following the collapse in value of their mining investments, the Wynne brothers pulled out of German mining in 1908, and refocused on local Irish projects. This focused Wynne's mother on her daughters need to develop a vocation to support themselves, encouraging them in intellectual and creative pursuits. Wynne was most likely educated at home by governesses. She trained in designing patterns for damask work from around December 1901 to March 1902 at Andrew S. Robinson Designing Rooms, Wellington Place, Belfast. Having attempted to sell her designs to some Belfast linen mills, she learnt the practical and economic realities of creating a design suitable for production. Wynne and her mother ran a lace repair and sales business from around 1905 to 1916, to supplement the family's income. Wynne ran the business again after World War I using her contacts in Europe. Both of Wynne's brothers fought in the war, with Charles dying in France from injuries he sustained. Wynne also wrote a novel with her sister Veronica, Every dog (1929), published under the pseudonyms E. and V. Pringle-West.

The sisters took over the running of the Avoca Woollen Mills in 1927, which was originally founded in 1723. The mill became known for its strong and unusual colours, which at the outset are reported to have been by accident. The Wynnes capitalised on this reputation, using unusual colours in their cloth with new lines, which proved a success overseas. The mill was soon supplying fabrics to fashion designers in France and woollen items to the United States. Wynne developed her own signature pink, along with other colours derived from her botanical knowledge allowing her to source and grow plants in their large walled garden for dyes. She became known for cultivating primulas including one named "Julius Caesar".

The Avoca Woollen Mills products were sold through the Country Shop on 23 St Stephen's Green, Dublin, and supplied tweed to the designer Elsa Schiaparelli. Wynne visited Schiaparelli in Paris in 1933 and 1937. She also made a trip to New York and Boston in 1935 with the American agent Carol Brown. They opened a shop in London in the 1930s, overseen by Wynne's cousin, Barbara Donovan, acting as the mill's English agent. The company was at its peak in the 1940s, employing 70 men and producing 500 yards of cloth a week.

== Death and legacy ==
Wynne died on 12 June 1958 at home in Tigroney House. The mill struggled without her direction, but continued into the early 1970s, when it was purchased by Donald Pratt who restarted the business using the Wynnes' palette of colours. Papers, diaries and other archival material from Wynne and her sisters are held in the Manuscript collections of the Library of Trinity College Dublin.
