= ABO Energy =

German company that develops renewable energy sources

- Formation: 1996
- Type: Kommanditgesellschaft auf Aktien (partnership limited by shares)
- Purpose: Renewable energy
- Headquarters: Wiesbaden
- Location: Wiesbaden, Hesse, Germany
- Key people: Executive Board: Susanne von Mutius, Dr. Karsten Schlageter, Dr. Thomas Treiling, Matthias Hollmann; Chairman of the Supervisory Board: Dr. Alexander Thomas
- Staff: 1,200
- Website: https://aboenergy.com/

ABO Energy GmbH & Co. KGaA is a German energy company which develops renewable energy sources (wind and solar energy, battery storage, and hydrogen). ABO Energy has international offices in France, Finland, Poland, Tanzania, UK, Ireland, Spain, Hungary, Argentina, Canada, Colombia, South Africa, Tunisia and the Netherlands. In Germany, ABO Energy operates at its corporate headquarters in Wiesbaden in Hesse as well as in Ingelheim and in regional offices in Berlin, Rhineland-Palatinate, Lower Saxony, North Rhine-Westphalia, Thuringia, Bavaria, Mecklenburg-Vorpommern and Saarland. As of 2026, the company has about 1,200 employees and is working on projects amounting to over 34 gigawatts worldwide.

== History ==
=== 1996–2000 ===
The beginnings of the company lie in 1996, when Jochen Ahn and Matthias Bockholt founded "the planning company for the use of wind power & other renewable energies". The first wind farm was built that year in Niederlistingen near Kassel. In 1998, the first citizens' wind farm projected by the company was connected to the grid in Framersheim, Rhineland-Palatinate. Until 2000, the company planned and built five wind farms in Hesse and Rhineland-Palatinate.

=== 2000–2020 ===
In 2000, the founders converted the GmbH into a stock corporation and renamed it ABO Wind. The first part of the company name is an acronym from the last names of the founders Ahn and Bockholt.

The oldest subsidiary abroad is ABO Wind España S.A.U. in Valencia, founded in 2001.

Since 2014, ABO Wind has applied to build a wind farm with eleven 150m tall turbines in Aughrim, County Wicklow, Ireland. Local residents vehemently opposed the plan and formed the South Wicklow Wind Action Group (SWWAG) to campaign against it. Wicklow County Council voted to reject the wind farm They reapplied again in 2017 which was also met opposition, but in 2019 An Bord Pleanála approved the wind farm, against the recommendation of their own inspector, and as of 2022 is awaiting judicial review.

The company started to work on solar projects in 2017.

In 2018, ABO Wind built a wind farm with five Senvion 3.2M122 wind turbines of 143 metres (469 ft) on former mining areas around the open pit mine in Jänschwalde, Brandenburg, in eastern Germany, very close to the Polish border. At the time it was announced that they had a "150MW portfolio consisting of 66 onshore wind turbines and one biogas plant". In early 2019, the company announced that it was discontinuing its work in Iran.

=== 2020–2024 ===
Battery storage projects were integrated into ABO Wind's business in 2020. Two years later, the first combined solar and battery storage project was connected to the grid.

In December 2022, the Greek subsidiary of the company completed the installation of the 50 megawatt Margariti solar farm in the Epirus region of north-western Greece, which was commissioned in December 2023. The photovoltaic farm which uses 93,000 bifacial panels and 10 central inverter stations is expected to produce some 76 GWh of green electricity and curb an estimated 32,000 tonnes of CO_{2} emissions each year.

In January 2023 it was announced that ABO Wind are to combine wind power with green hydrogen for a refueling station for buses and lorries, in the Hessisches Kegelspiel business park in Hünfeld, the result of over ten years of development into hydrogen power. Hydrogen will be produced using an electrolyzer, in which water electrolysis is powered by a wind turbine, and is expected to be able to fuel 50 lorries a day.

In February 2023, ABO Energy formed an agreement with Repsol Renovables for five renewable energy projects, including three wind farms amounting to 150 megwatts, and two solar projects with a total capacity of 100 megawatts on sites in Palencia in northern Spain. Once completed in 2024 and 2025, the sites will provide electricity to 172,000 homes in the region. The company is also active in the Castile and León region of northern Spain, and between 2019 and 2022 developed a wind farm in Valladolid.

In 2023, the shareholders voted in favour of changing the legal form of the AG to a partnership limited by shares at an extraordinary general meeting. In the course of considering the new legal form, the company also scrutinised its name. The company's new name, ABO Energy, reflects the significant growth in its technological horizons since it was founded in 1996. In July 2024, the company has completed its change of legal structure.

As of 2024, ABO Energy has planned and built energy farms with a total volume of more than 5.5 gigawatts of capacity and has over 1,200 employees. It has connected around 900 wind, solar and battery storage facilities with a nominal capacity of over 2.5 gigawatts to the grid in Germany, France, Finland, Spain, the United Kingdom, Greece, Hungary, Bulgaria, Ireland, Tunisia, Poland, and Iran.

== Services ==
ABO Energy covers all stages of renewable energy project development internationally - planning, financing, construction supervision and organization. As a service, the company offers commercial and technical management for wind farms, solar farms and battery storage as well as maintenance and other services. Customers are buyers of the plants projected by ABO Energy as well as other operators such as Rheinenergie. To improve the security of wind farms and to control access, the company has developed the electronic locking system ABO Lock. Usually with commissioning, ABO Energy sells the plants, for example, to energy suppliers, cooperatives or institutional investors.

== Locations ==
Currently, the company is active on four continents. In Germany, ABO Energy operates at its corporate headquarters in Wiesbaden as well as in Ingelheim and in regional offices in Berlin, Rhineland-Palatinate, Lower Saxony, North Rhine-Westphalia, Thuringia, Bavaria, Mecklenburg-Vorpommern as well as in Saarland. The company has established a global presence with international offices in Finland, France, the UK, Ireland, Poland, Spain, Hungary, Argentina, Canada, Colombia, South Africa, Tunisia, Tanzania, and the Netherlands.

== Management board ==
In 2024, six people made up ABO Energy’s Management Board: Dr. Karsten Schlageter, Dr. Jochen Ahn, Matthias Hollmann, Susanne von Mutius, Alexander Reinicke and Dr. Thomas Treiling. As of 2026, the board is composed of Dr. Karsten Schlageter, Matthias Hollmann, Susanne von Mutius and Dr. Thomas Treiling.

== Supervisory board ==
At the Annual General Meeting in June 2017, the shareholders elected the former Minister of Economics and Energy of Rhineland-Palatinate, Eveline Lemke, to the supervisory board. In 2026, Dr. Alexander Thomas (chairman), Maike Schmidt, Dr. Daniel Duben, Natalie Hahner, Jürgen Koppmann and Moritz Möller form the supervisory board.
