= Avoca, County Wicklow =

Village/town in County Wicklow, Ireland

Avoca Abhóca
- Town
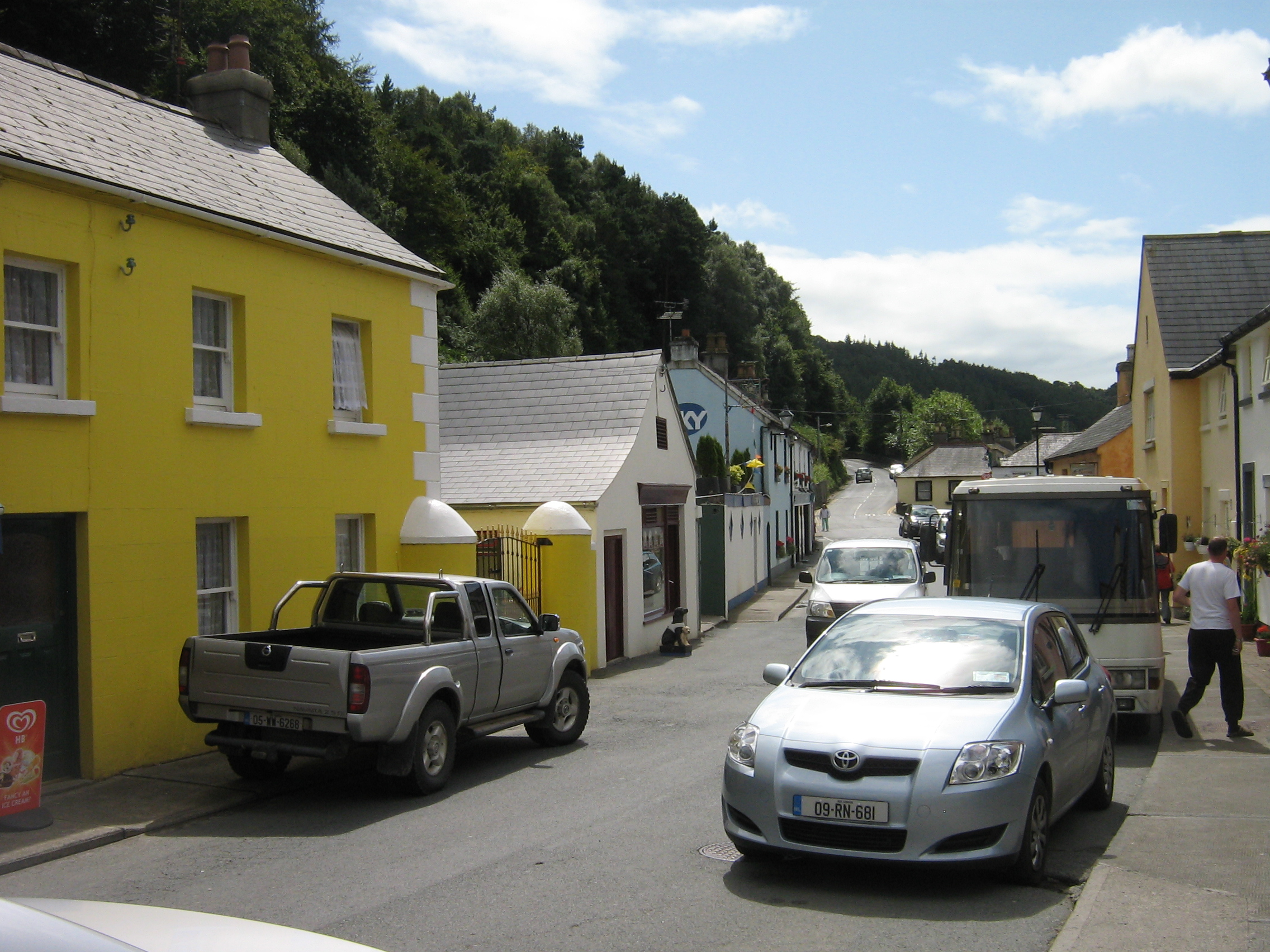
- Main Street

- Location in Ireland
- Coordinates: 52.857°N 6.215°W
- Country: Ireland
- Province: Leinster
- County: County Wicklow
- Elevation: 35 m (115 ft)

Population (2022)
  - Total: 757
- Irish Grid Reference: T201801

Avoca (Irish: Abhóca, formerly Abhainn Mhór, meaning 'the great river') is a small town near Arklow, in County Wicklow, Ireland. It is situated on the River Avoca.

The Avoca area has been associated with its copper mines for many years and the valley has been celebrated by Thomas Moore in the song "The Meeting of the Waters". The name of the song derives from the meeting of the Avonmore and Avonbeg rivers, about 3 kilometres from the village of Avoca. The song is said to have been written under a tree, the stump of which remains by the Meetings. Avoca is also famous for its handweaving, with Avoca Handweavers based there.

Avoca has been used as a filming location for several films and television series. The BBC series Ballykissangel was filmed there. In 1967, Avoca was one of the locations used in the film Jules Verne's Rocket to the Moon, and it was the setting for the comedy film Zonad which had a general Irish release in 2010.

The red kite, recently reintroduced to Ireland, is now commonly seen in and around Avoca.

== Toponymy ==
Avoca was once known as Newbridge. It subsequently became known as Ovoca, and then in Victorian times as Avoca. Ptolemy mentions the river Oboka on his early map of Ireland. The official name of the village is now Avoca in English and Abhóca in Irish. None of the other names are used today.

== Mining ==
Copper mining is reported to have begun in the Avoca River valley around 1720 and it continued, with interruptions, until 1982. Earlier mining, perhaps dating back to the Bronze Age, may have occurred. The East Avoca site, today, is composed mainly of a number of rock waste spoil heaps, abandoned quarries (Cronebane and East Avoca open pits) and disused roads. The largest spoil heap, Mount Platt, was built up from waste rock excavated from Cronebane open pit. There was a mineral tramway built from the West Avoca mines, through the village (on the opposite side of the river) and on to Arklow Harbour. The route of most of this was subsumed into the Dublin-Rosslare railway line, but an arch and a tunnel under the road from Rathdrum to Avoca remains.

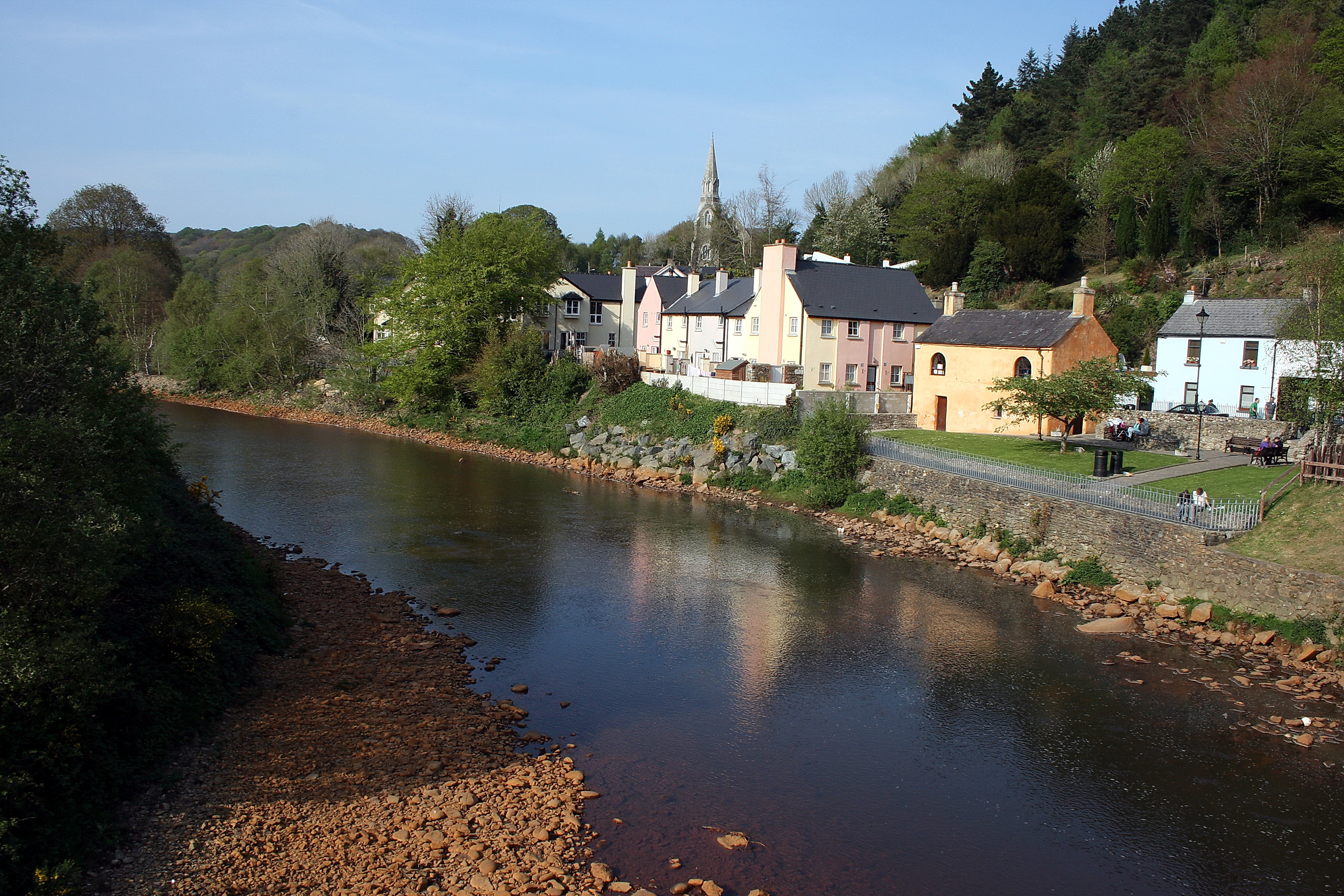
River Avoca at Avoca, note copper-coloured stones on the river bed

== Transport ==
Avoca lies on the R752 regional road linking Rathnew with Woodenbridge. Bus service to Avoca is provided by Local Link route 183 from Arklow to Sallins.

There has been some local political pressure to reopen Avoca railway station, from which passenger services were withdrawn on 3 March 1964, almost 101 years after its opening, on the Dublin-Rosslare railway line, on 18 July 1863.

== International relations ==
Avoca has a town twinning agreement with Bromham, Wiltshire in England.

== Filming location ==
The following films and television shows have been filmed in part at the village or the ruined Avoca mines:

- Vikings (2013–2020)
- Cocaine Bear (2023)

== Notable people ==
- Noel Andrews (1932–2011), Irish radio and television commentator ran The Avoca Inn from 1970 to 1990
- George Barret Sr. (c. 1730–1784), Irish landscape artist painted at Avoca
- Aaron Bolger (born 2000), Irish professional footballer who plays for Galway United
- Oliver Byrne (1810–1880), civil engineer and author of scientific works was born in the Vale of Avoca
- Harry Harrison (1925–2012), American science fiction author, lived in the area in the 1970s
- Lawrence Kavenagh (c. 1810–1846), Irish-Australian convict bushranger was born in either Newbridge (now called Avoca) or nearby Rathdrum
- Pauline Mellon, Irish mathematician was born in the town
- Abraham Mills (c. 1750–1828), English mining company manager and geologist, one of the earliest advocates of investment in Irish gold mining, spent time mining for copper in Avoca
- John O'Hagan (1873–1930), Irish priest who served as Rector of the Pontifical Irish College in Rome from 1919 to 1930 was born in Ballykillageer near the town
- Akihiko Okamura (1929–1985), Japanese photographer notable for his work in Northern Ireland during the Troubles
- Chris Pontius (born 1974), American stunt performer and cast member of reality stunt show Jackass lived in the town from 2004 to 2008
- Donald Pratt (born 1935), Irish businessman and former first-class cricketer purchased Avoca Handweavers in 1974
- Günther Schütz (1912–1991), German citizen who worked for German Intelligence (Abwehr) during World War II retired in Avoca
- Emily Wynne (1872–1958), Irish author and textile artist worked at Avoca Woollen Mills

== See also ==
- List of towns and villages in Ireland
- Avoca, Victoria, Australia which was named after the Avoca in Wicklow
- The Avoca School, Blackrock, County Dublin
