= River Aughrim =

River in Ireland

Coordinates: 52°50′53″N 6°17′05″W

River Aughrim Abhainn Eachroma
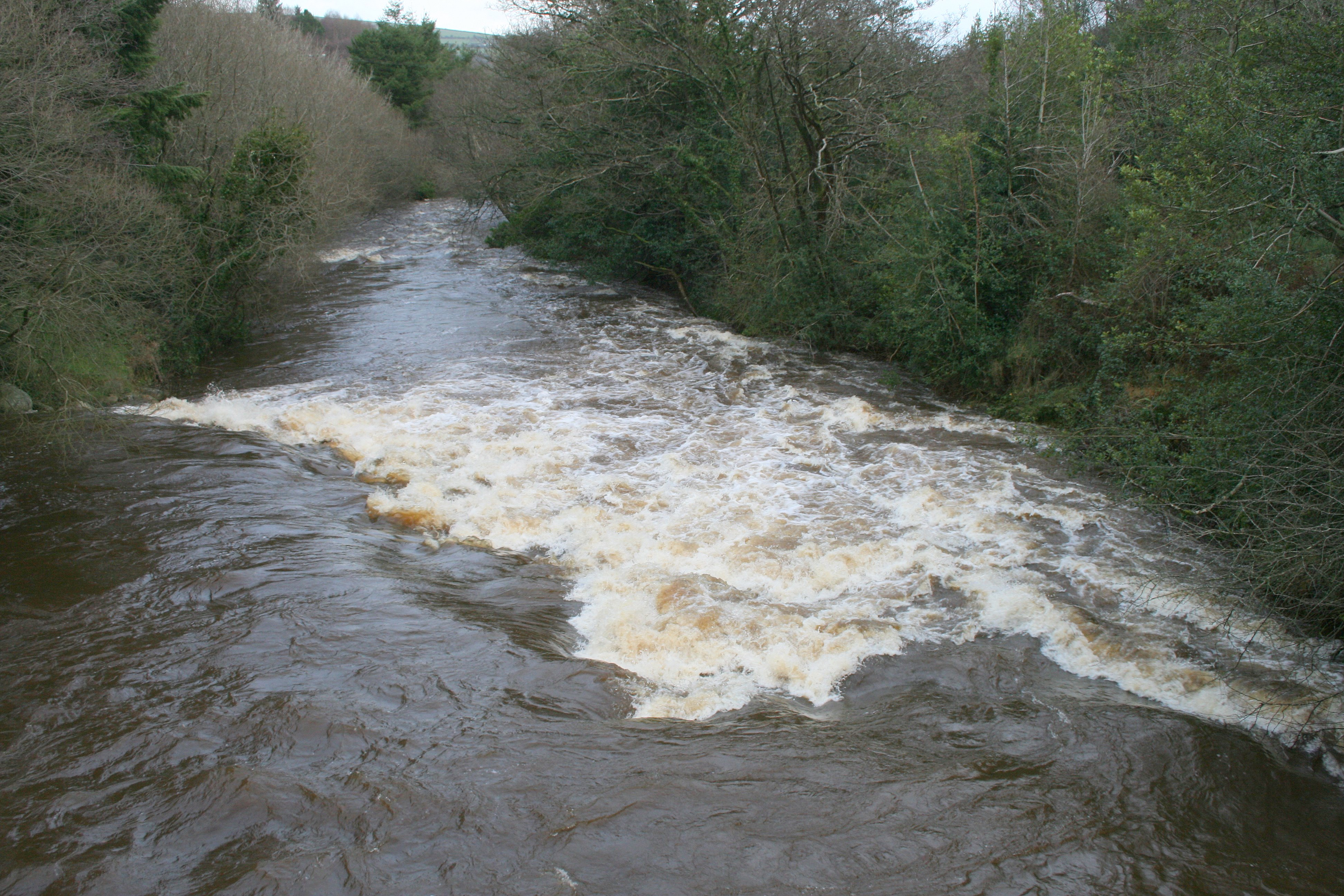
- The River Aughrim

Physical characteristics
- Source
  - location: Aughrim, County Wicklow
- Mouth: Avoca
  - location: Woodenbridge, County Wicklow

The Aughrim River (Irish: Abhainn Eachroma) flows from confluence of the Derry Water and River Ow south of the village of Aughrim in County Wicklow in Ireland. It flows in a generally easterly direction for approximately 12 km (7.5 mi) following the R747 regional road for its full length before joining the River Avoca in the Vale of Avoca, which in turn discharges into the Irish Sea at Arklow. From source to sea the river remains in East Wicklow.

The R747 crosses the river twice, near Aughrim and downstream at the village of Woodenbridge, before the Aughrim discharges into the Avoca river.

== See also ==
- Rivers of Ireland
