= Avoca Handweavers =

Retail company in Ireland

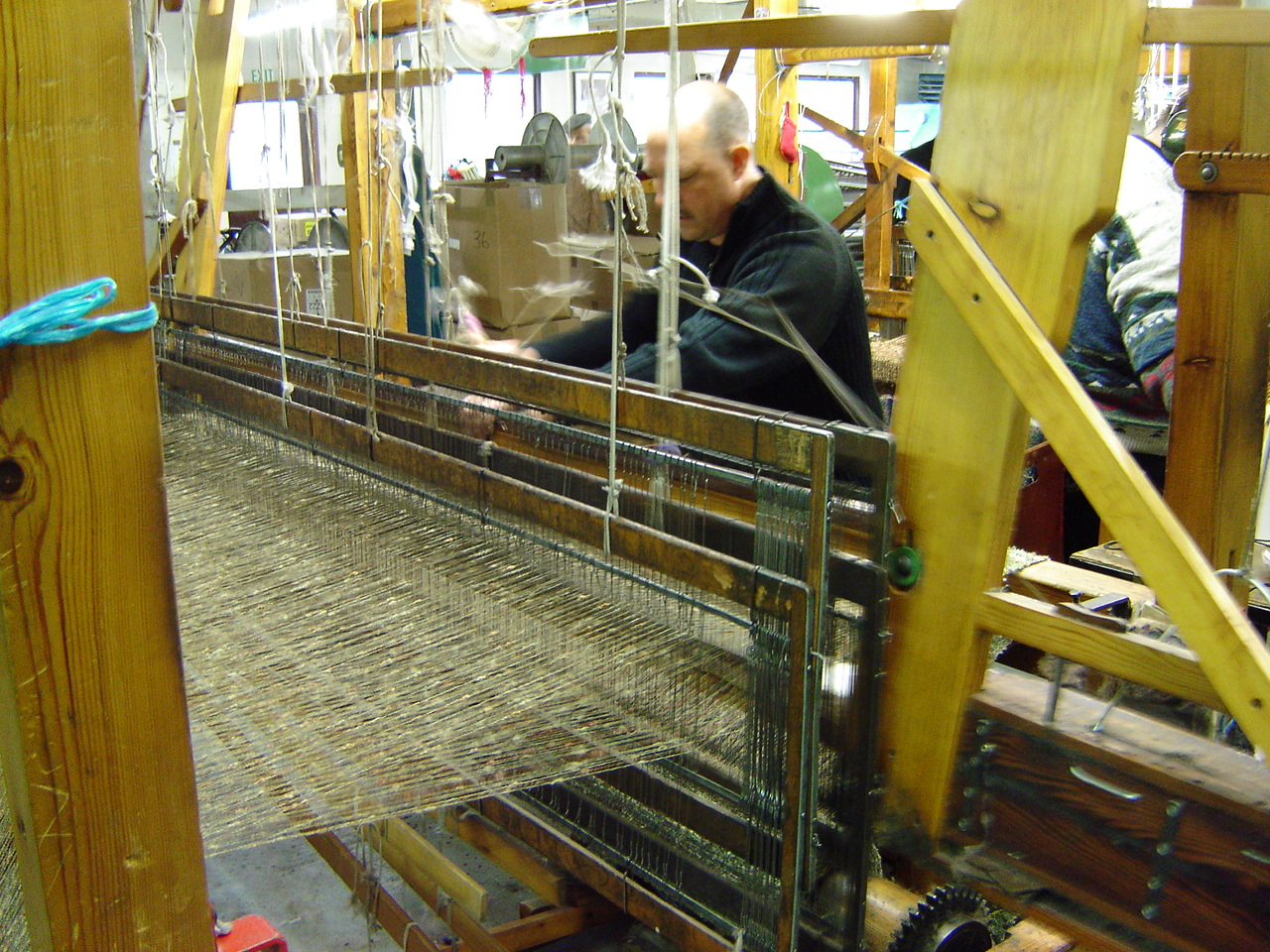
- Hand weaving machine in use at the Mill
- Type: Private
- Industry: Textile and clothing manufacturing, retail, cafés
- Founded: 1723
- Headquarters: Kilmacanogue, County Wicklow, Ireland
- Products: Clothes, other woollen goods, soft furnishings, food, ceramics, books, soaps & perfumes
- Number of employees: 1,000 (2020)
- Parent: Aramark
- Website: avoca.com

Avoca Handweavers, now mostly known simply as Avoca, is a clothing manufacturing, retail and food business in Ireland. The company began in Avoca, County Wicklow, and is the oldest working woollen mill in Ireland and one of the world's oldest manufacturing companies.} Since 2015, it has been owned by the American food service and facilities company, Aramark.

== History ==
The mill on the banks of the fast-flowing River Avoca survives from at least 1723. Travel to and from the remote village was difficult and a barter system was used. The mill was used for grinding corn for bread and spinning and weaving wool.

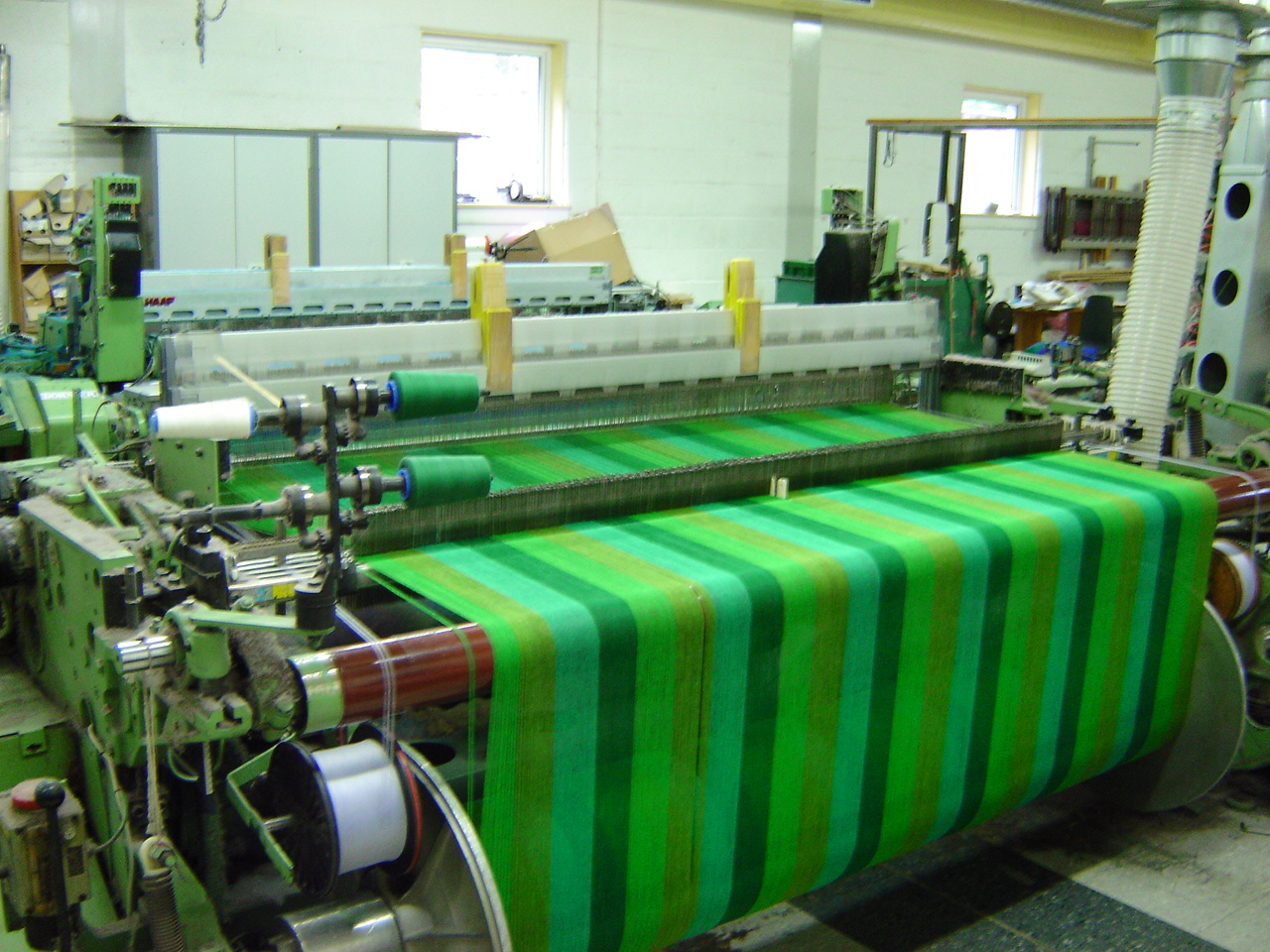
A mechanised weaving machine in use at the Mill

In 1760, a flying shuttle loom, capable of weaving up to 20 metres of cloth a day arrived. Workers, concerned about possible unemployment, resorted to burning some looms.

=== Wynne sisters ===
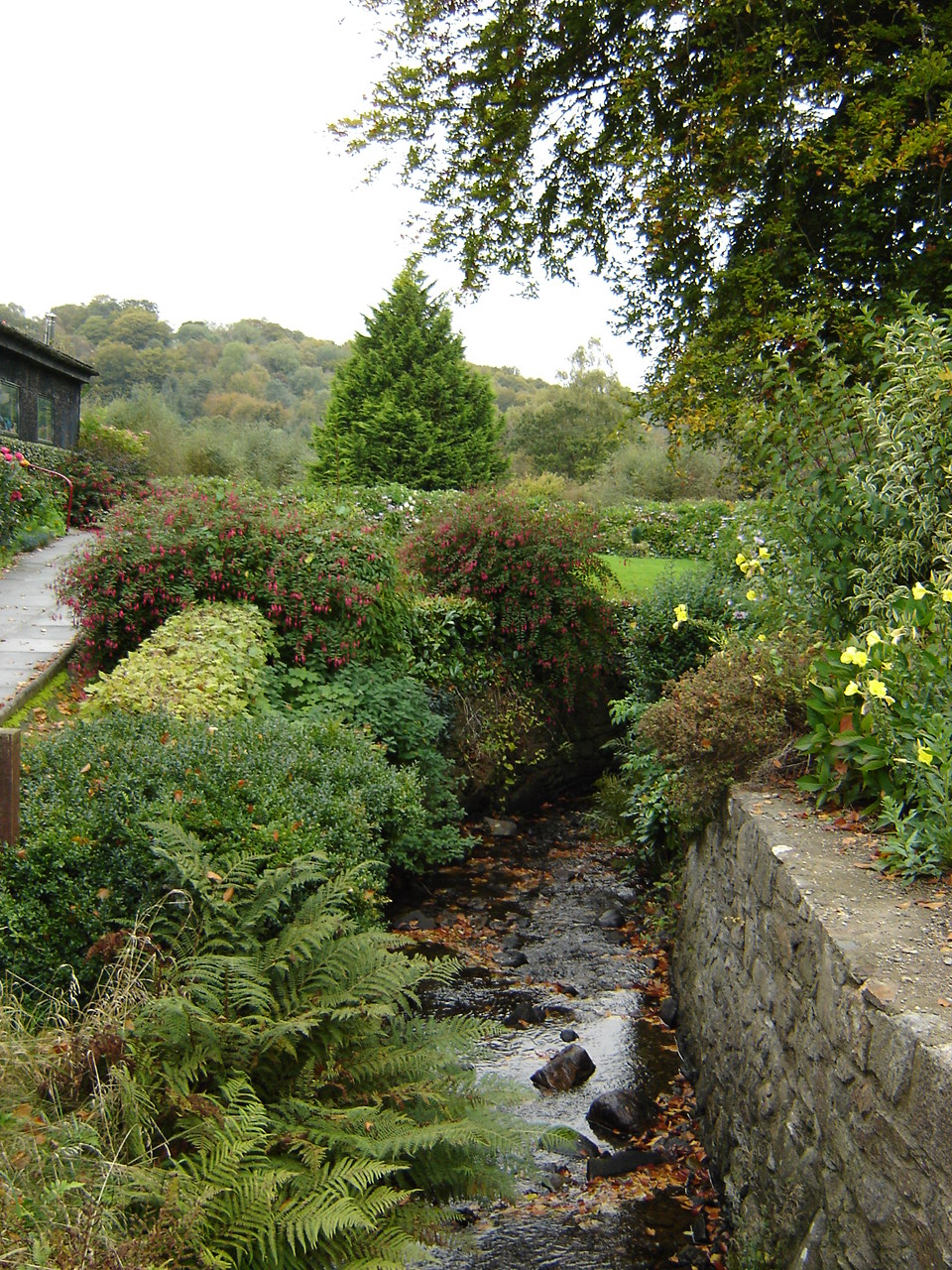
Grounds around the Avoca mill

Three sisters, Emily, Winifred, and Veronica Wynne, inherited the mill in the 1920s and introduced colour. Avoca Handweavers tweed was produced and exported, including for use by Italian designer Elsa Schiaparelli. According to letters held in the mill's on-site museum, the material was also used for a waistcoat for King George VI and baby blankets for the children of Queen Elizabeth II.

=== Pratt family ===
In 1974, Donald Pratt, a solicitor and former cricketer engaged to handle the sale of the mill which now faced closure, decided to buy it himself. Along with his wife, Hilary, a teacher, he set about getting Avoca Handweavers back on its feet. The Pratts began exporting handwoven rugs and throws to the UK and other countries. Avoca throws are still sold across the globe.

In 2015, the Pratt family sold Avoca Handweavers to the American company Aramark.

=== Aramark ===
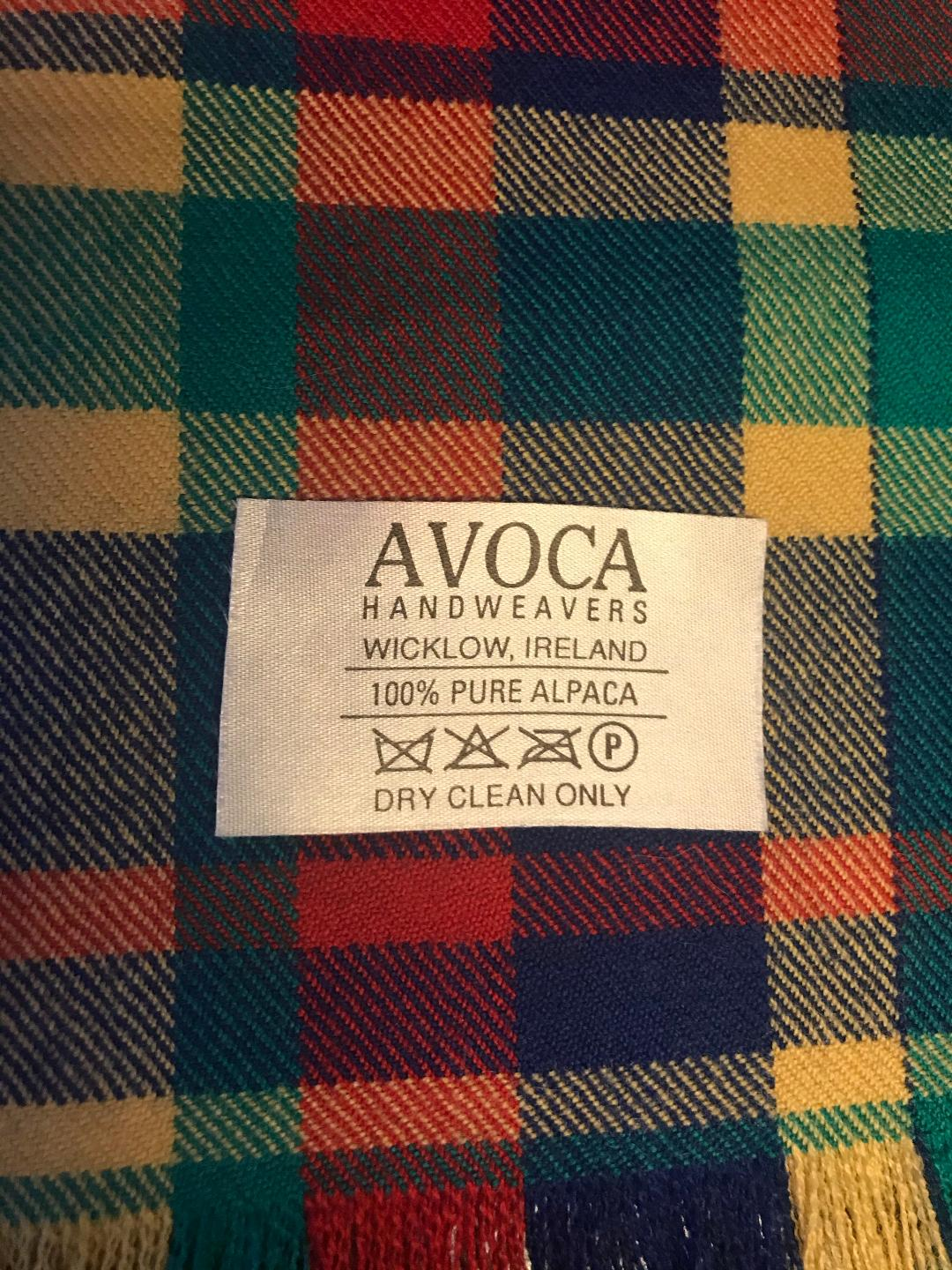
Label on alpaca scarf

As of 2020, Avoca has several retail outlets around Ireland, including at Powerscourt Estate, Malahide Castle and in Belfast. Several of these also have foodhalls and cafes attached as their food operations were expanded.

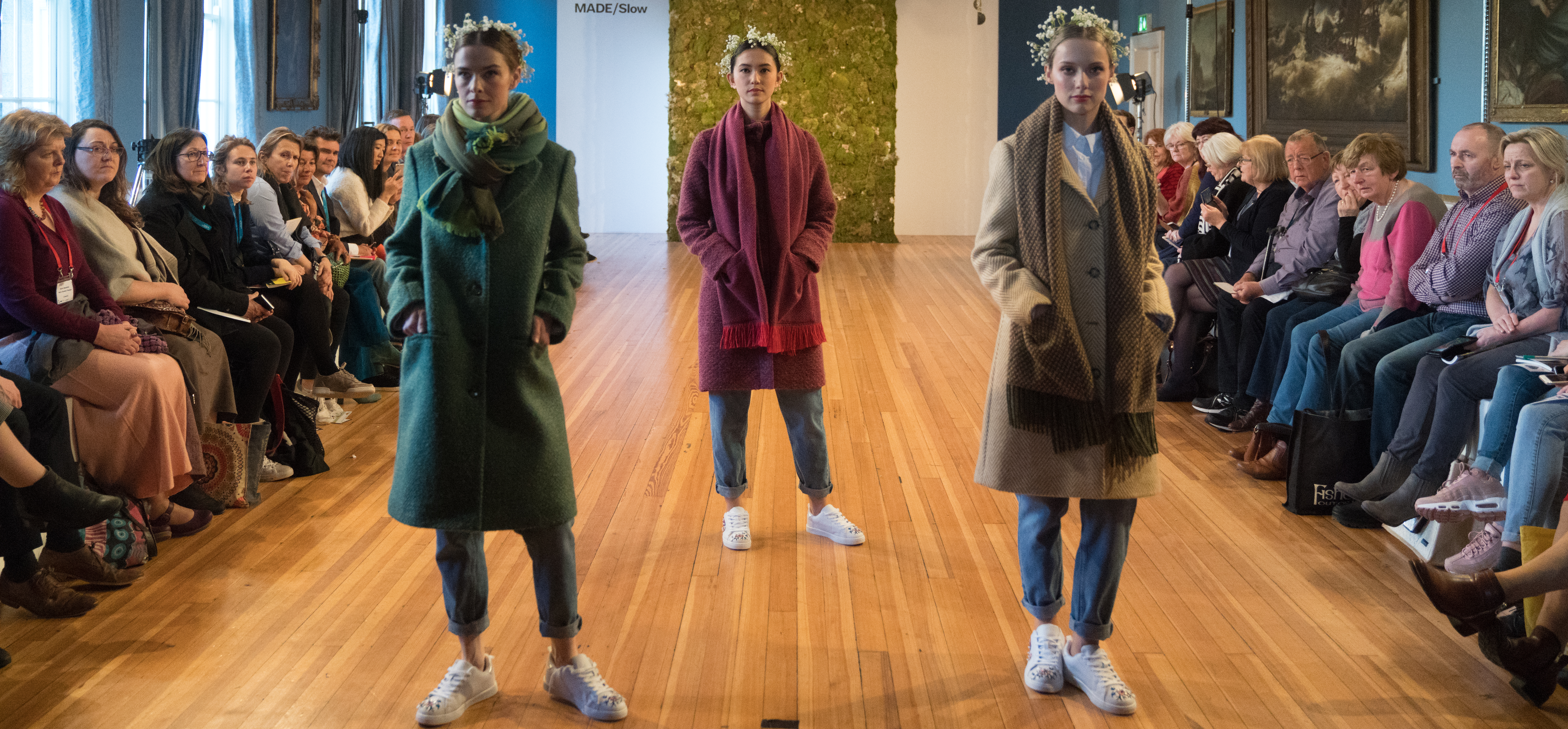
Avoca clothing

The company has a number of women's clothing ranges which it sells through its own stores designed by Amanda Pratt, as well as wholesaling in Ireland and internationally. One of these ranges is known as 'Avoca Anthology'.

Avoca is also associated with gardens and has several rare and ancient trees in its Kilmacanogue grounds, as well as operating a garden, café, and food market at Mount Usher Gardens in Ashford, County Wicklow.

As of 2020, the company reportedly employed approximately 1,000 people.

== Expansion into Food, Retail, and E-commerce ==
During the 1980s, under the management of the Pratt family, Avoca began diversifying its operations beyond textile manufacturing into hospitality and lifestyle retail. The expansion was largely spearheaded by Donald and Hilary Pratt's children, with Amanda Pratt developing the brand's clothing and ceramics lines, and Simon Pratt overseeing the introduction of cafés and artisanal food markets.

Avoca opened its first table-service restaurant in August 2000 on Suffolk Street in Dublin city centre. The company subsequently established a central bakery and kitchen in 2010 to supply its growing network of cafés. In 2011, Avoca opened its first dedicated food market in Monkstown, County Dublin, focusing on artisanal and locally sourced Irish ingredients.

The brand currently operates 14 physical locations across the island of Ireland. These include its original mill in Avoca Village, a multi-level store on Suffolk Street in Dublin, destination retail and garden sites in Kilmacanogue, Rathcoole, Dunboyne, Ballsbridge, and Belfast, as well as locations on the grounds of Malahide Castle and Mount Usher Gardens.

In addition to its brick-and-mortar footprint, Avoca operates a global e-commerce platform and corporate gifting division. Its retail offerings encompass traditional woven throws and scarves produced at the Wicklow mill, alongside own-brand fashion labels (such as 'Avoca Anthology'), homeware, beauty products, and curated Irish food hampers. The growth of the retail, food, and e-commerce divisions was a primary driver in the company's acquisition by multinational food service corporation Aramark in 2015 for a reported €60 million.
