= Aughrim, County Wicklow =

Town in County Wicklow, Ireland

Aughrim Eachroim (Irish)
- Town
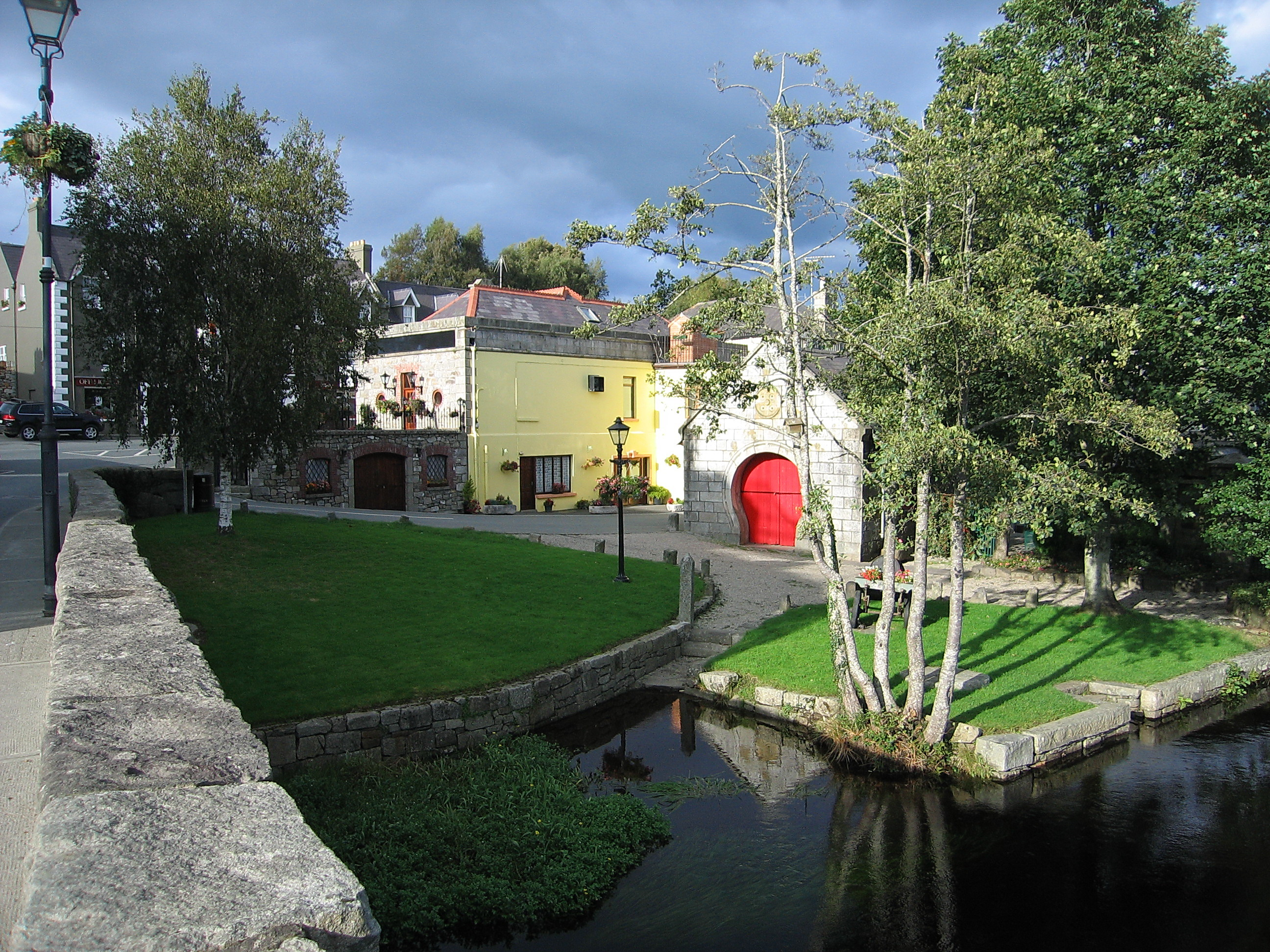
- The Blacksmith's Forge beside Aughrim River

- Location in Ireland
- Coordinates: 52.8533°N 6.3275°W
- Country: Ireland
- Province: Leinster
- County: Wicklow
- Elevation: 100 m (330 ft)

Population (2016)
  - Urban: 1,442
- Irish Grid Reference: T123797
- Website: www.aughrim.ie

Aughrim (/ˈɑkrəm/, /ˈɑxrəm/; Irish: Eachroim, meaning 'horse ridge') is a small town in County Wicklow, Ireland. It lies in a scenic valley in the Wicklow Mountains in the east of Ireland where the Ow and Derry rivers meet to form the Aughrim River. Aughrim is on the R747 road between Arklow and Baltinglass, and the R753 regional road.

== Architecture ==
The Rednagh Bridge south of the town was the site of an engagement during the 1798 rebellion between Crown forces and the rebels.

A plaque on the bridge commemorates Anne Devlin, who was employed by and supported Robert Emmet, a revolutionary who was hanged in 1803 for his leadership of an aborted uprising.

There are a number of unusual granite terraced houses throughout the village, constructed - along with a forge, and town hall - at the behest of the Earl of Meath. Aughrim was a granite mining village, and this material is widely used, giving the village a distinctive and coherent architecture.

Aughrim has won the Irish Tidy Towns Award for the tidiest town in County Wicklow from 1996 to 2007 and won the Irish Tidy Towns Competition in 2007.

== Wind farm dispute ==
Since 2014, German-owned company ABO Wind has applied to build a wind farm surrounding Aughrim. It would include eleven turbines (150 m tall) with access roads, covering the hills between Aughrim and Arklow, in the townlands of Ballymanus, Roddenagh, Killaduff, Askekeagh, Ballinglen, Preban, Tomcoyle, Kilballyowen, Killacloran, Clone, Coolahullin, Ballycoog Upper and Lower, Ballykillageer Upper and Lower, Ballintemple, Coolgarow, Kilcarra East and West, Glenart, Shelton Abbey, Kilbride and Killinskyduff. Local residents have opposed the plan and formed the South Wicklow Wind Action Group (SWWAG) to campaign against it. Wicklow County Council voted to reject the wind farm. In 2017, ABO Wind applied to build the wind farm again, with minor adjustments. This was also opposed, but in 2019 An Bord Pleanála approved the wind farm, against the recommendation of their own inspector. This controversial decision has been awaiting judicial review.

== Sports ==
Aughrim has a number of walking trails, with the Sean Linehan Way starting by Tinakilly Bridge on the east side of the village, while just to the west the Ciaran Shannon Way can be accessed via the Rednagh Road or by parking at Annacurragh village.

The village is home to the county grounds of the Wicklow county Gaelic Athletic Association team. The 'Angling for All' fishing lake and Aughrim river provide rainbow and brown trout fishing. A Paul McGinley-designed golf course is open at nearby Macreddin.

== People ==
- Tara Blaise, singer, grew up in the village
- Shane Byrne, Irish rugby union international was born in Aughrim
- Anne Devlin (1780–1851), accomplice of Robert Emmet

== Gallery ==
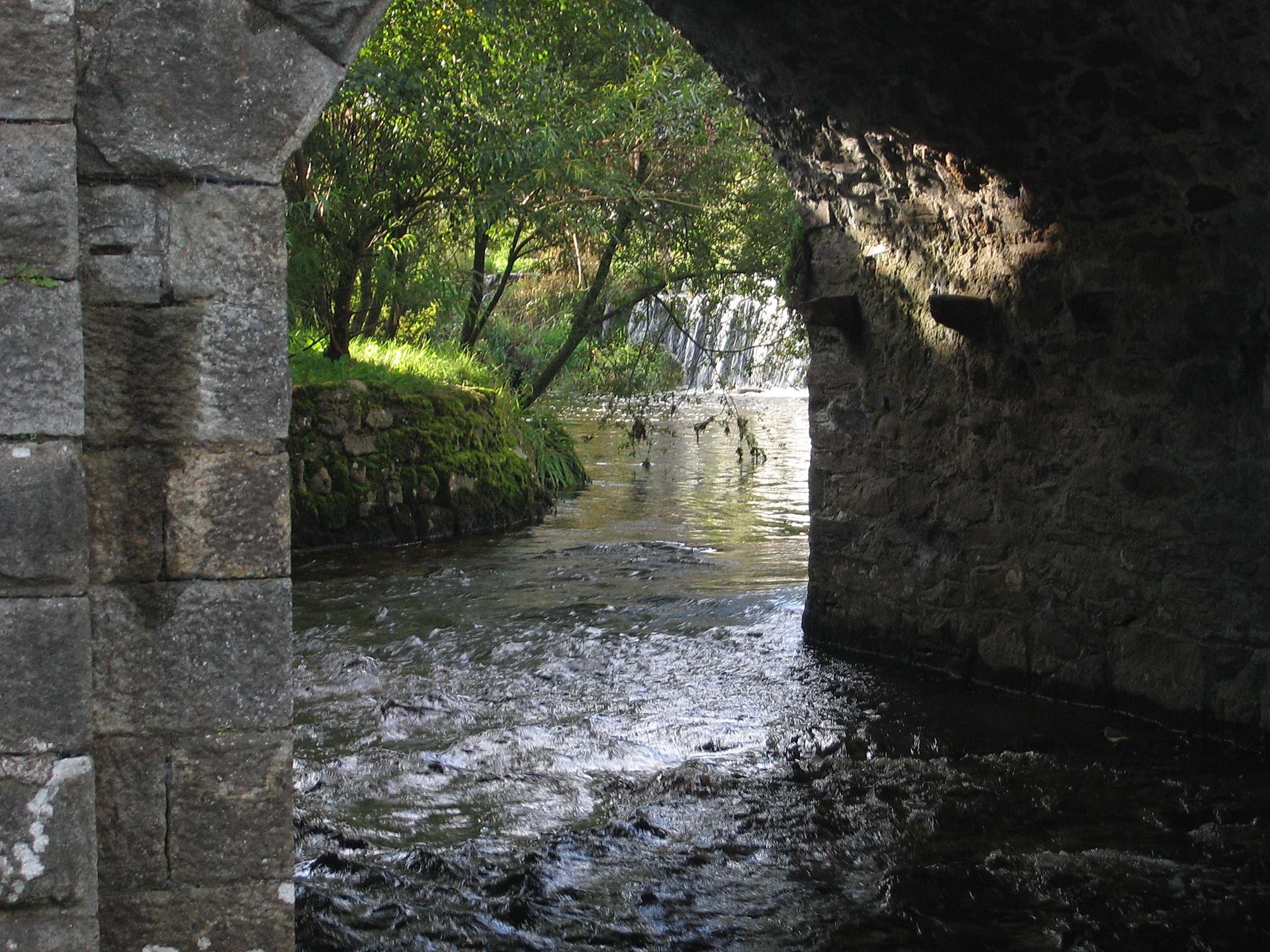
River Aughrim

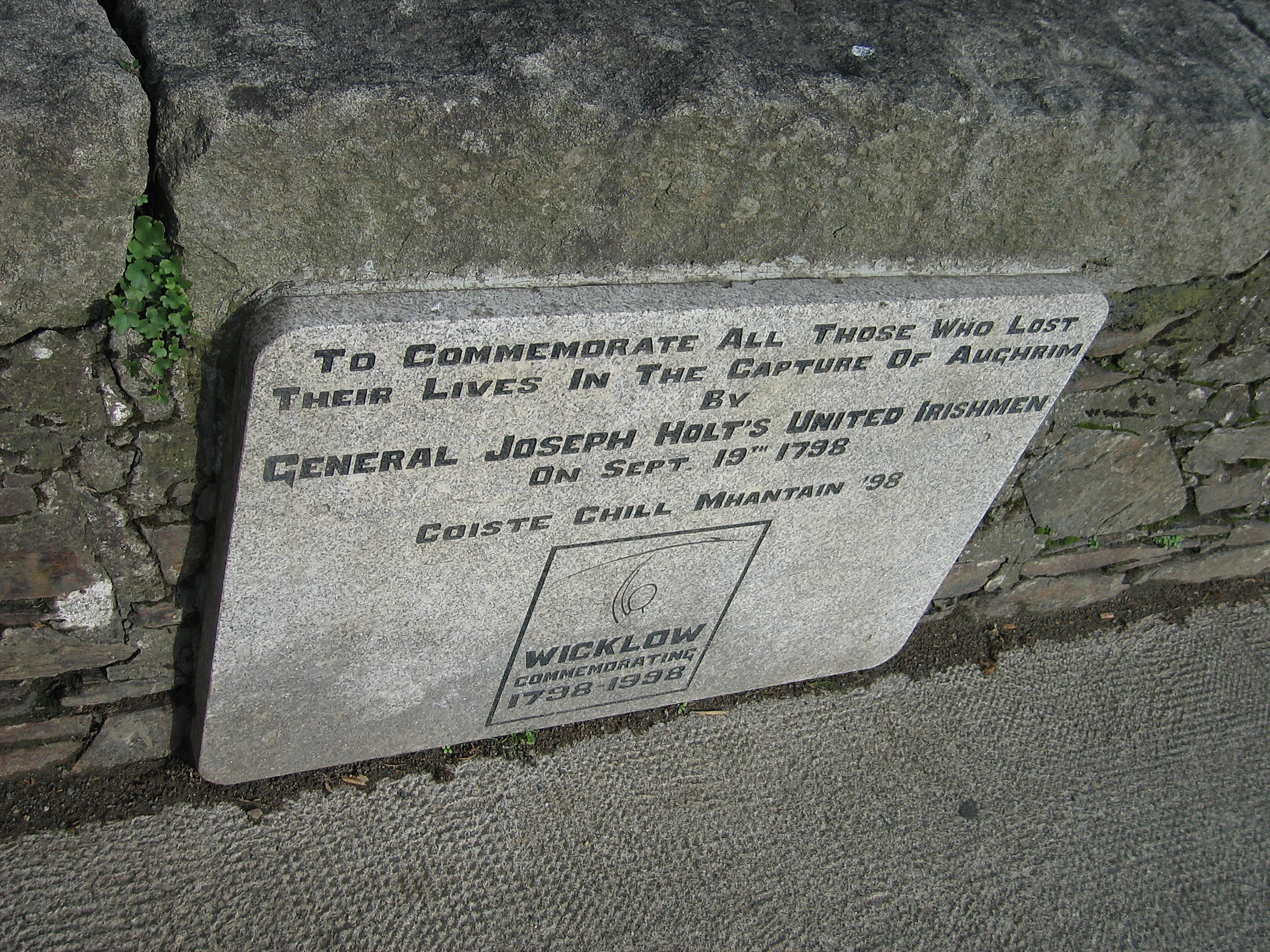
1798 Rebellion commemoration plaque

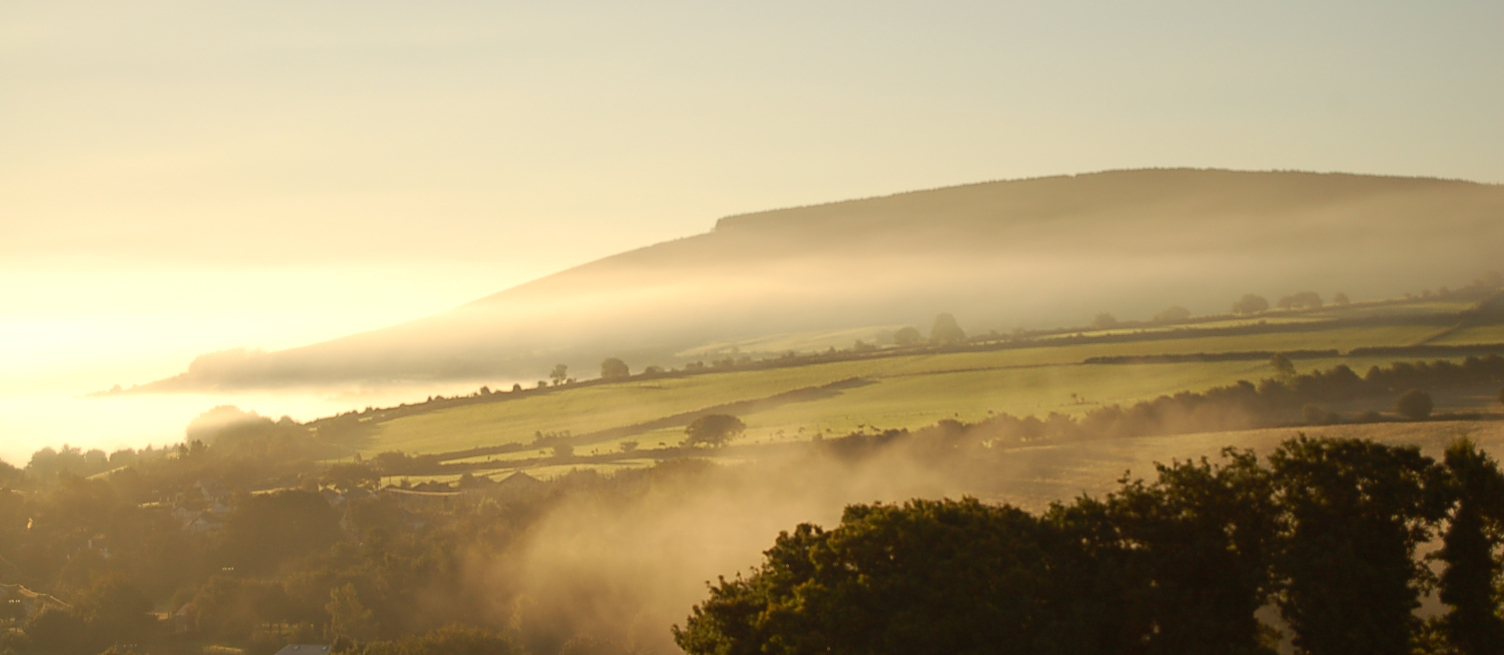
Hills overlooking Aughrim

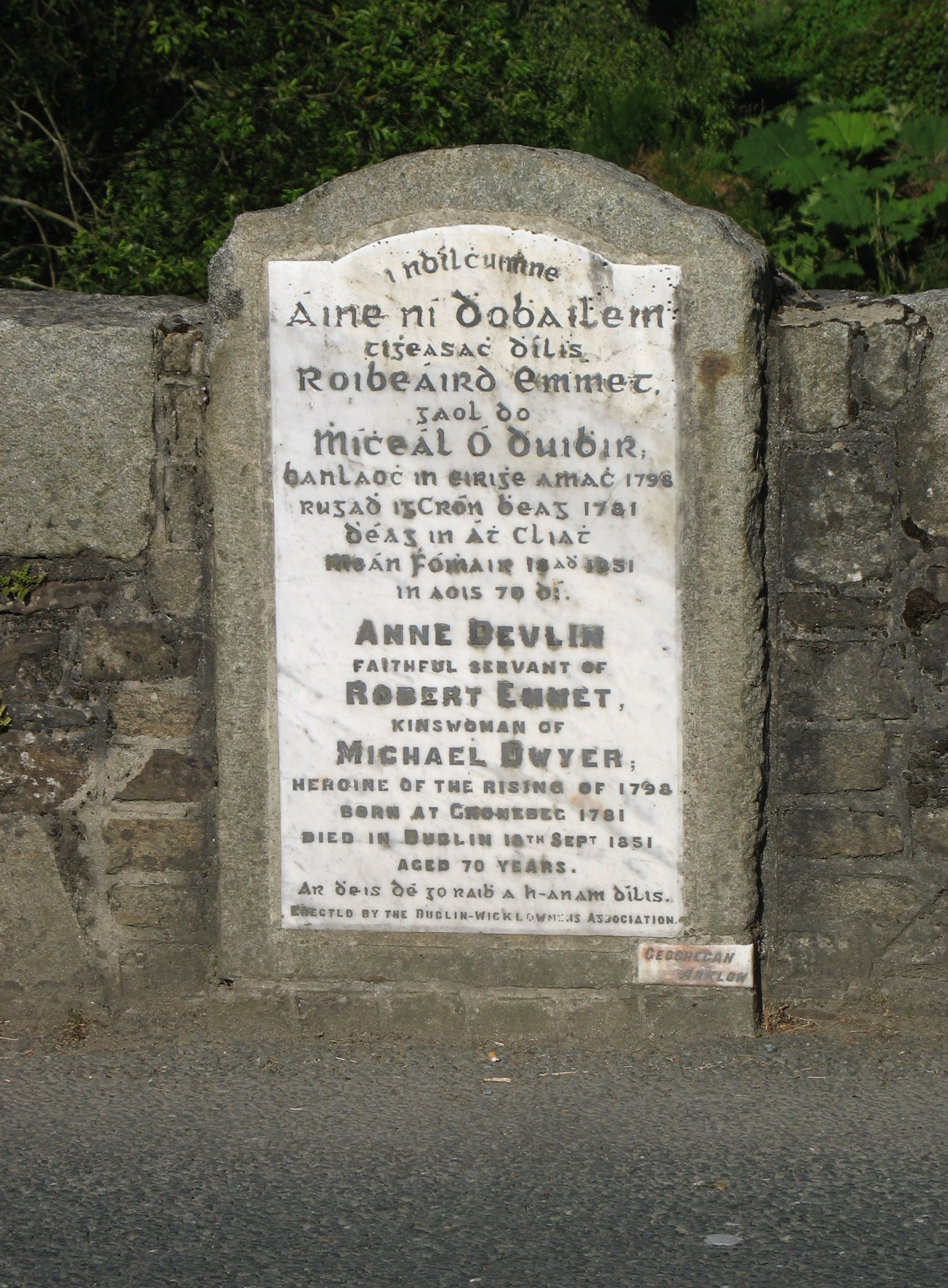
Anne Devlin plaque

== See also ==
- List of towns and villages in Ireland
- List of Market Towns in Ireland
