= Asher, Oklahoma =

- Town
- Nickname: Baseball City
- Location in the state of Oklahoma
- Coordinates: 34°59′19″N 96°55′31″W
- Country: United States
- State: Oklahoma
- County: Pottawatomie
- Established: Post Office 1901

Area
  - Total: 0.77 sq mi (1.99 km^{2})
  - Land: 0.77 sq mi (1.99 km^{2})
  - Water: 0 sq mi (0.00 km^{2}) 0%
- Elevation: 997 ft (304 m)

Population (2020)
  - Total: 370
  - Density: 481.8/sq mi (186.02/km^{2})
- Time zone: UTC-6 (CST)
  - Summer (DST): UTC-5 (CDT)
- ZIP code: 74826
- Area codes: 405/572
- FIPS code: 40-03000
- GNIS feature ID: 2411648
- Website: www.asherok.info

Asher is a town in Pottawatomie County, Oklahoma. As of the 2020 census, Asher had a population of 370.

== Geography ==
Asher is located at the intersection of U.S. Highway 177 and State Highway 39 in Pottawatomie County. According to the United States Census Bureau, the town has a total area of 0.8 square miles (2.1 km^{2}), all land.

=== Nearby areas ===
Asher is approximately 30 miles (48 km) south of I-40 and 34 miles (55 km) east of I-35. Nearby cities (with a 15,000+ population) include Ada (21 miles south) and Shawnee (27 miles north). Asher is located two miles (3 km) west of Chisholm Spring, once the site of a trading post operated by Jesse Chisholm, for whom the famous cattle trail was named. A Chisholm family home and cemetery are also located in Asher. The Sacred Heart Mission Site is nine miles east of Asher.

== Demographics ==
Historical population
Census	Pop.	Note	%±
1910	381		—
1920	370		−2.9%
1930	653		76.5%
1940	507		−22.4%
1950	420		−17.2%
1960	343		−18.3%
1970	437		27.4%
1980	659		50.8%
1990	449		−31.9%
2000	419		−6.7%
2010	393		−6.2%
2020	370		−5.9%
U.S. Decennial Census

=== 2020 census ===
As of the 2020 census, Asher had a population of 370. The median age was 38.4 years. 24.1% of residents were under the age of 18 and 15.1% of residents were 65 years of age or older. For every 100 females there were 79.6 males, and for every 100 females age 18 and over there were 76.7 males age 18 and over.

0.0% of residents lived in urban areas, while 100.0% lived in rural areas.

There were 141 households in Asher, of which 36.2% had children under the age of 18 living in them. Of all households, 41.8% were married-couple households, 10.6% were households with a male householder and no spouse or partner present, and 41.8% were households with a female householder and no spouse or partner present. About 26.9% of all households were made up of individuals and 7.8% had someone living alone who was 65 years of age or older.

There were 162 housing units, of which 13.0% were vacant. The homeowner vacancy rate was 3.1% and the rental vacancy rate was 2.0%.

Racial composition as of the 2020 census
Race	Number	Percent
White	265	71.6%
Black or African American	1	0.3%
American Indian and Alaska Native	53	14.3%
Asian	0	0.0%
Native Hawaiian and Other Pacific Islander	1	0.3%
Some other race	14	3.8%
Two or more races	36	9.7%
Hispanic or Latino (of any race)	28	7.6%

=== 2010 census ===
As of the 2010 United States census, there were 393 people, 161 households, and 106 families residing in the town. The population density was 491.25 inhabitants per square mile (189.67/km^{2}). There were 184 housing units at an average density of 230 per square mile (89/km^{2}). The racial makeup of the town was 75.8% white and 13% Native American, with the remainder of another race or mixed race. The population included 10 Hispanic or Latino individuals.

There were 161 households, out of which 32.3% had children under the age of 18 living with them, half (49.7%) were married couples living together, 16.1% had a single householder with no spouse present, and 34.2% were non-families. Individuals living alone accounted for 29.2% of households. Individuals living alone who were 65 years of age or older accounted for 14.3% of households. The average household size was 2.44 and the average family size was 3.01.

In the town, the population was spread out, with 27.7% under the age of 18, 5.9% from 18 to 24, 23.1% from 25 to 44, 24.7% from 45 to 64, and 18.6% who were 65 years of age or older. The median age was 41.6 years. For every 100 females, there were 96.5 males.

The median income for a household in the town was $35,962, and the median income for a family was $44,444. The per capita income for the town was $17,340. An estimated 9.2% of families and 12.2% of the population were below the poverty line, including 2.9% of those under age 18 and 20.8% of those age 65 or over.

== History ==
=== Beginnings ===
Asher dates back to 1892 when George "Matt" Asher, from Clay County, Kentucky, purchased land in Oklahoma Territory from a Shawnee estate salesperson to set up his farm home. The post office was established November 26, 1901, when the postmaster of nearby Avoca, Oklahoma, George A. McCurry, moved the Avoca post office and his store to the new community that would become Asher. This was done without permission from the government and left Avoca without a post office. According to the tale, McCurry was given a home and store building as payment for moving the post office to the new settlement. The town was named for Mr. Asher, who supplied the land with the consideration the community would carry his namesake, though he never lived there. There was a sale of public lots in 1902.

=== Avoca Township ===
Asher is the last remaining post office in the original Avoca Township, which also included the towns of Sacred Heart Mission, Osmit, Avoca, Meanko, Boyer and Violet.

=== Growth ===
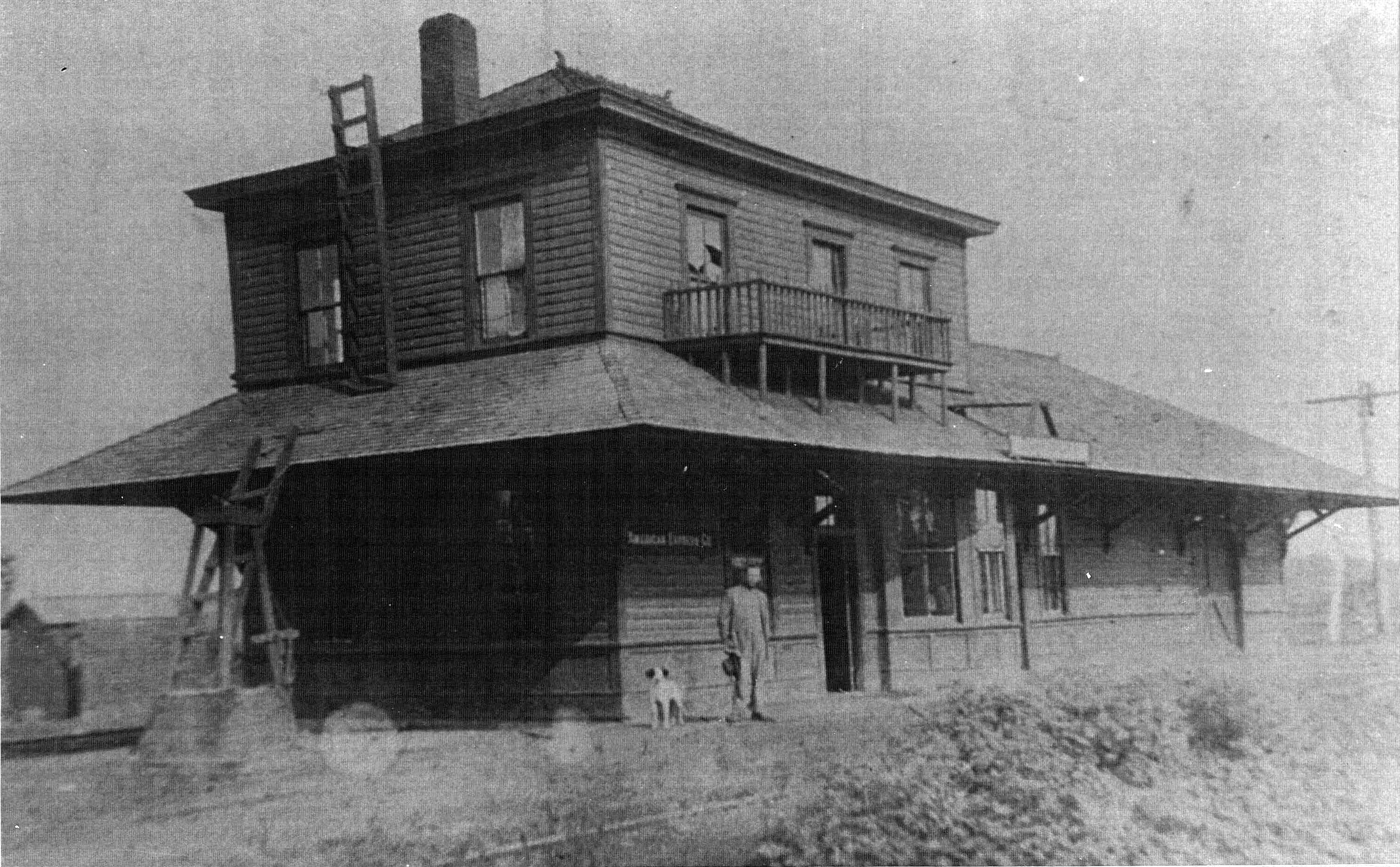
Rock Island Train Depot, Asher, 1902. The station was located at the west end of Main St., west of what is now US 177. The stationmaster, Bill Bailey, is pictured.

On October 12, 1900, the Choctaw, Oklahoma and Gulf (CO&G) bought the Shawnee to Tecumseh Railway branch from the Tecumseh Railway Co. and promptly extended the branch to Asher. For the next 40 years, Asher would serve as the termination point for the branch and its engine, "Old Beck". Rapid construction of railroads opened up 400 square miles (1,000 km^{2}) of a fertile section of the South Canadian River valley to shipping facilities. Asher was the trade center and market of the area. Further development came when, on January 15, 1903, The Jennings Company closed on 1,000 business and residence lots. The Jennings Company advertised investment in the growing town and new factories and industries of various kinds soon located in Asher.

Asher and the new settlers had hopes of creating a large city. However, the settlers were disappointed when the towns of Seminole and Konawa were built and took away much of Asher's trade. The people of Asher would not give up, and pulled together town resources and constructed a bridge across the Canadian River. The state then used the bridge in its construction of State Highway 18, drawing a small amount of trade to the area from nearby cities, such as Ada. Before the construction of the bridge, those south of Asher could only cross the river when it was shallow enough.

Asher, originally a cotton farming community, suffered in its early years from crop losses caused by boll weevils. Farmers were then dealt a further blow when the town's first two cotton gins were destroyed by fire. These setbacks compounded the loss of trade and left the town in dire straits.

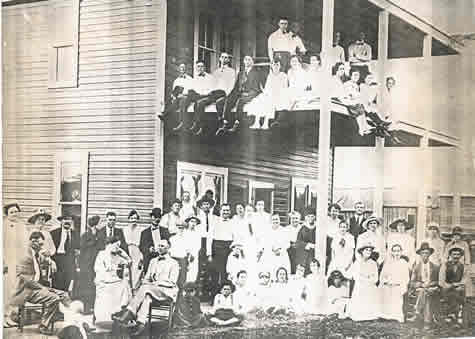
Graham Hotel on Asher's Main Street, 1918

In 1927, oil was discovered in and around the town. Asher sprang up almost overnight to serve the needs of the oil workers. It was also around this time that executives moved into Asher and purchased enormous amounts of supplies and merchandise at inflated prices. There were many businesses in town including feed and grocery stores, jewelry stores and drug stores as well as banks, barber shops, hotels and a small theater. Many leading families of Oklahoma, such as the McAlisters, the O'Dells, the Patterson's, the Campbells and the Byruns, lived in the town. There were also many doctors with offices in Asher. For a while, Asher became prosperous.

=== County Seat potential ===
Tecumseh, Oklahoma, was originally the county seat of Pottawatomie County. In late 1930, a long-standing war between Shawnee and Tecumseh escalated when voters approved measures to move the seat to Shawnee. A spin-off of this feud was the move for the creation of a new county, to be named Petroleum County. The new county would be composed of prime oil-producing land, including the southern half of Pottawatomie County and portions of Seminole, Pontotoc and McClain Counties. The move was started by Tecumseh supporters who wanted to make Shawnee's county seat victory as hollow as possible by removing the most valuable section of the county. Asher was slated to be the county seat and it was planned that the greater part of Tecumseh would move down to form an impressive community. There was a paper--The Petroleum County Times—produced, meetings held and petitions circulated. However, the measure never progressed further as times were not favorable for the creation of a new county.

=== End of the oil boom ===
The oil boom ended when only four wells proved to be profitable. Once again, Asher was in danger of dying out. Fortunately, another oil well was found just west of the town. This time the people connected to the well were local citizens and were cautious and conservative in their estimates and spending. This led to a small but steady production of oil in the community. Asher was dealt another setback in 1967 when SH-18 was taken out of commission and traffic was diverted west of town on the new US Highway 177. Businesses migrated to the new highway and many storefronts in the original town were closed. The final business, Green's Market, which was located on Division Street (old SH-18) closed in 1985, after serving the community for 40 years. Several businesses on US-177 remain, mostly serving those traveling through the area.

=== Centennial ===
In 2001, Asher celebrated its 100th anniversary. The town, along with others in the county that had passed the centennial mark, was honored on a centennial monument dedicated September 21, 2007. This date was chosen to coincide with the Oklahoma Centennial. Other Asher honorees were the First Baptist Church, which was founded in 1902 and Asher School, which was established in 1903. The monument is located in Centennial Park, on the grounds of the Santa Fe Museum, in Shawnee, Oklahoma.

=== Timeline of major events ===
Below is a time table of major events that occurred in Asher as well as surrounding communities whose events affected Asher's history.

Date	Event
1847	Jessie Chishom establishes trading post 2 mi (3.2 km) east of Asher
1849	Avoca area (Wewaukee Springs) a regular stop for adventures on way to the gold rush in CA
1862	Chishom post abandoned
1892	First members of Asher family move to OK to est. home
	First school in Avoca (near what is now Avoca Cemetery)
1893	First general store in Avoca
October 30, 1901	Asher townsite opened up
November 26, 1901	Post Office established
	Public sale of lots ($750)
1902	George Stone (Dep. Sheriff) moves to Asher
	Asher townsite platted, G.M. Asher supplies land
April 26, 1902	Shawnee-Tecumseh railroad expands to Asher / Old Beck begins service
Early 1900s	Asher Altruist begins
	Asher FBC then First Methodist est.
	Town became center of baseball interest
1904	District Judge J. Knox Byrum born in Asher
1906	Asher Mercantile Co. established
December 13, 1906	Asher State Bank robbed
Up to 1920s	2 hardware stores, 2 banks, jewelry store, lumber yard, dry goods store, general store, and (until 1907) 6 saloons—per Annie Roe
May 1921	Canadian River Bridge opens
1922	Fire destroys 2 blocks of businesses
January 1925	Fire destroys blk of business, incl. Canadian Valley Bank
1927	Pearson oil discovered
September 2, 1927	Canadian Valley Bank robbed
1928	Water well drilled to supply water to oil fields
c. 1928	Oil workers/executives moved in; Asher prosperous
1929	Oil discovered in Asher
	Asher School current building built
1931	Petroleum County/Asher county seat talks
1940s	Asher School gym built
February 10, 1942	Shawnee-Asher railroad branch ends
1967	Asher segment of SH-18 is replaced with US-177, diverting traffic from town.
1985	Green's Market closes after 40 years
2001	Centennial
2006	Asher School main building renovated

== Post office ==
Asher's post office was established on November 26, 1901, when it was moved from nearby Avoca.

Below is a list of Asher postmasters.

Date started	Postmaster
29 Nov 1901	George A. McCurry
8 June 1904	Charles Snook
11 June 1906	Kate R. Snyder (or Snider)
14 Sept 1914	John S. Wood
8 Dec 1917	Winnie D. Rawlings
20 Feb 1920	Winnie R. Farmer
25 Aug 1922	Fred M. Perkins
12 Mar 1923	Lillian Gilpin (acting)
11 June 1923	Francis T. Laster
7 Mar 1927	John R. Hibbard (acting)
15 Dec 1927	John R. Hibbard (appointed)
1 July 1935	Orval L. Harris (acting)
24 Jan 1935	Orval L. Harris (appointed)
14 June 1940	John A. King
19 May 1949	Pearl A. Hopkins (acting)
1 Sept 1950	Perry H. Townsend, Jr.
14 Dec 1979	Linda L. Sturgill (ofc. in charge)
8 Mar 1980	Rosemary McKinley
30 Sept 1992	Janna Jones (ofc. in charge)
28 Oct 1992	Teresa Sexton (ofc. in charge)
9 Jan 1993	Donald Slarve
28 Jan 1993	Teresa Sexton (ofc. in charge)
14 May 1993	Vicky Stover (ofc. in charge)
13 Nov 1993	Deborah L. Cooley
29 Mar 1995	Lois L. Rennewanz (ofc. in charge)
22 July 1995	Lois L. Rennewanz
11 Apr 1998	Cynthia Schaffer (ofc. in charge)
5 June 1998	Debbie Turner (ofc. in charge)
12 Sept 1998	Deborah D. Turner
21 Feb 2001	Deborah Zimmerman (ofc. in charge)
7 July 2001	Carol Kelly (ofc. in charge)
25 Mar 2002	Bill Beard (ofc. in charge)
N/A	L. M. Conley (ofc. in charge)
13 May 2003	Lindsay A. Williams-Likens (ofc. in charge)
23 July 2003	Michael L. Hockersmith (ofc. in charge)
19 May 2004	Wayne A. Cooksey (ofc. in charge)
13 Nov 2004	Michael L. Hockersmith

== Education ==
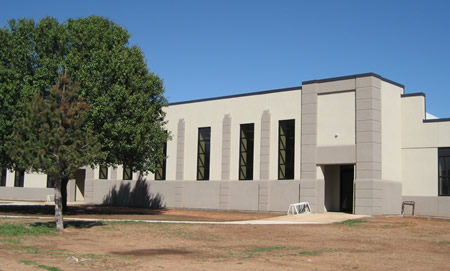
Asher School following renovation

The town is in the Asher Public Schools school district.

Asher Public Schools is an independent school district. It has an elementary school (grades Pre-K to 8) and a high school (grades 9 to 12). The school was established in 1903. In 1913, there were four other school districts within three miles (5 km) of Asher—Clover Dale, Gravel Hill, Avoca, and Pleasant Hill. The schools were small, consisting of only a room or two. Basic facilities were at a minimum. Talk began of consolidating all of the schools into the Asher district. This was later accomplished, presumably around the time Asher's new school building was built in 1929.

== Media ==
=== Television ===
Asher receives the following television stations off-air.

- KFOR-4 NBC (Oklahoma City)
- KOCO-5 ABC (Oklahoma City)
- KWTV-9 CBS (Oklahoma City)
- KTEN-10 NBC (Sherman-Denison, TX)
- KXII-12 CBS (Sherman-Denison, TX)
- KETA-13 PBS (Oklahoma City)
- KOKH-25 FOX (Oklahoma City)
- KOCB-34 CW (Oklahoma City)
- KAUT-43 MNT (Oklahoma City)
- KSBI-52 IND (Oklahoma City)
- KOPX-TV-62 i (Oklahoma City)

=== Newspaper ===
The following newspapers are circulated in Asher.

- The Canadian Sands (monthly, regional; Wanette, OK)
- The Ada Evening News (daily; Ada, OK)
- The Shawnee News-Star (daily; Shawnee, OK)
- The Oklahoman (daily; Oklahoma City)

== Notable people ==
- Ron Williamson - minor league baseball player, subject of John Grisham's first work of non-fiction, The Innocent Man

== Additional photos ==
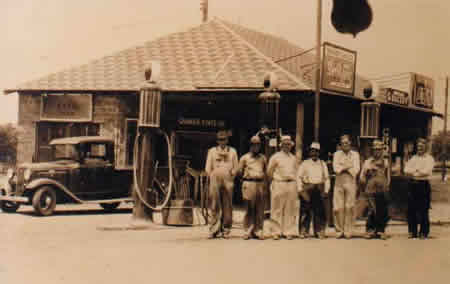
An early Asher gas station

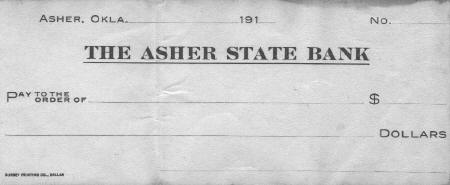
An Asher State Bank check, from 1910s

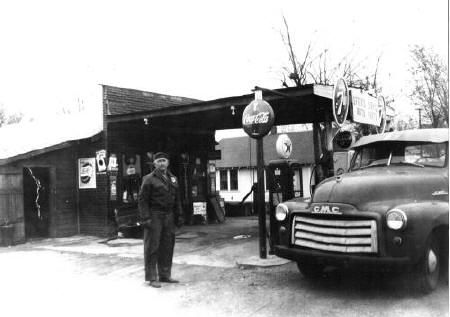
Albert Browder's station (Joseph Lessie Speers, pictured), 1956

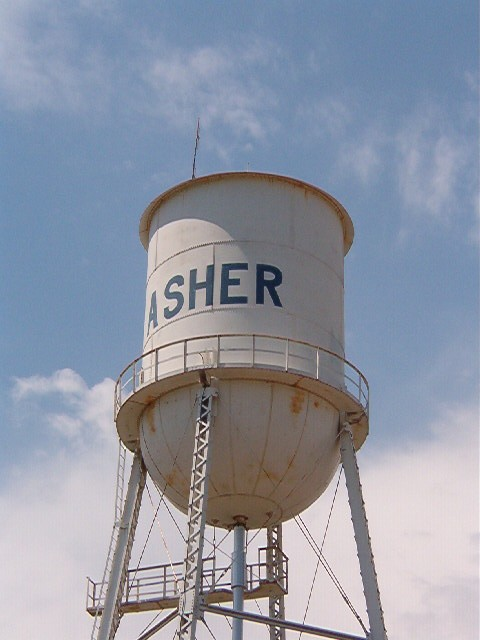
Asher water tower 1, 2006

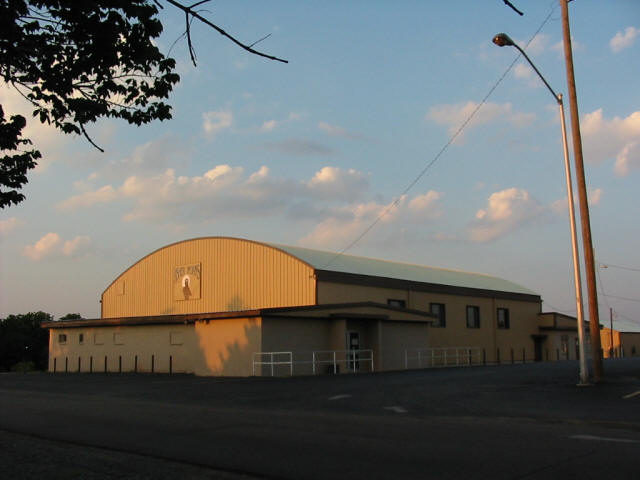
Asher gymnasium, 2006

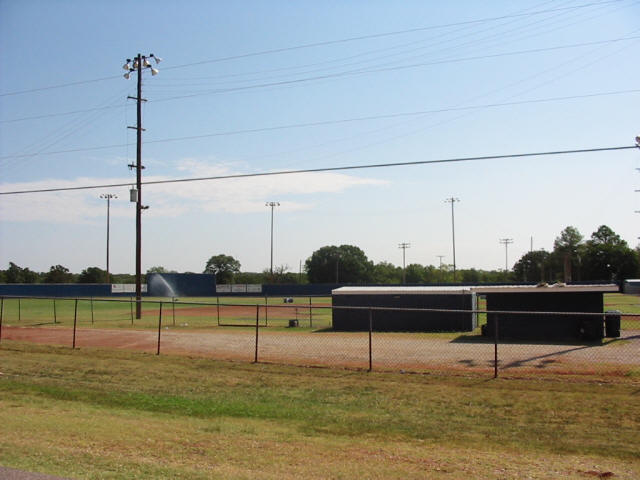
Bowen Field, 2006
