= Avoca, Oklahoma =

Avoca
- Ghost Town
- Location within the state of Oklahoma
- Coordinates: 35°0′50″N 96°55′50″W
- Country: United States
- State: Oklahoma
- County: Pottawatomie
- Time zone: UTC-6 (Central (CST))
  - Summer (DST): UTC-5 (CDT)

Avoca was a small town in Avoca Township, located in southeastern Pottawatomie County, Oklahoma Territory. The post office was established in 1894 and closed permanently in 1906.

== Avoca Township ==
Avoca should not be confused with Avoca Township, which covered a much larger area than the town itself. This section of the article will cover the entire township, with the remainder the town itself. Avoca township was located in southeastern Pottawatomie County, with Konawa Municipal Township (and the Seminole County line) to the east, St. Louis Township to the north and the South Canadian River to the south. The western boundary was about two and a half miles west of present-day Asher. The township encompassed about 75 square miles. Post offices in the Avoca Township area included:

Town	Post Office Dates
Sacred Heart Mission	1879–1949
Osmit	1884–1887
Avoca (later Asher)	1894–present
Meanko	1896–1901
Boyer	1897–1900
Violet	1899–1905

=== Statistics ===
The following table shows the population grown and then decline of Avoca Township. The population decline beginning in 1920 can be attributed to a growing interest in Shawnee, OK.

Year	Households	Individuals	Home owners	Home renters	Housing not specified
1900	390	2,156	178	212	0
1910	808	4,228	413	139	0
1920	628	3,204	288	272	68

=== Schools in the township ===
Schools in the township, and what is known about them, include:

- Asher (c. 1913 – present). Asher is and was the only high school developed within the township. See Asher, Oklahoma.
- Avoca (1892 – ?). See the section below.
- Cook (1892 – aft. 1920). The school, originally one-room, was formed in 1892 and later expanded when a second and larger room was added. At some point between 1910 and 1920, the building was completely refurbished and again enlarged. It is believed this school was located near the Pottawatomie-Seminole county line.
- Gravel Hill School (1903 – ?). This school replaced Lazell School.
- Lazzell (1895–1903). This school, housed in a log cabin, was located two and a half miles east of Asher, near Chisholm Springs. It began around December 1895 and closed in April 1903 (due to financial shortfalls, there was no school 1899-1900). It was replaced by Gravel Hill School.

Teacher	Year
Miss Alice Shelton	1895–1897
Miss Mollie Ferrell	1898
Mr. Willis	1898–1899
J.G. Hudiburg	1899
No School	1899–1900
F. M. Forston	1900–1903

- Sacred Heart. The school had a small enrollment.

== Avoca (town) brief history ==
The village was established in the mid-19th century as Wewaukee Springs (Wewaukee is Seminole for "tumbling water"). It was located along the "Wagon Road" that traveled east to west across the territory. Early residents of the town included Seminole Indians as well as white persons. By 1910, most Seminoles had left the area Pottawatomi Indians populated the town.

=== Avoca School ===
The first Avoca school was established in the summer of 1892 near what is now the Avoca Cemetery. Early day teachers included J.C. Fisher, B.C. Klepper, A. Floyd, F.M. Forston, Nora Kidd, Minnie Synder (sic), A.C. Bray and Wheeler Hendon.

=== Post Office ===
The post office was established August 4, 1894. It was discontinued and moved to Asher twice, once temporarily on November 26, 1901, and again permanently on September 26, 1906.

==== Postmasters ====
Postmaster/mistress	Dates Served
Sallie T. Bess	August 4, 1894 – August 7, 1898
George A. McCurry	August 8, 1898 – November 25, 1901
No Office (moved to Asher)	November 26, 1901 – February 9, 1902
James K. Polk	February 10, 1902 – September 26, 1906

=== Other establishments ===
R. Perkins opened the first general store. A Rutherford and J.B. Buckler built a cotton gin. M.F. Merrill started a blacksmith shop. Establishment of the town was considered a natural development since the Wewoka Springs had been a stopping place for travelers before the opening of the territory.

=== Demise ===
In 1901, "Old Beck", a rail spur from Shawnee, was extended to the fledgling community of Asher, Oklahoma, a few miles south. This event spelled the demise of Avoca. In the winter of that year, the postmaster, George A. McCurry, moved the Avoca post office and his store to the new community. The change officially took place on November 26, 1901. This was done without permission from the government and left Avoca without a post office. The post office was re-established on February 10, 1902. However, many people and businesses moved to the growing Asher community. An Asher paper reported "Avoca About Abandoned" on August 21, 1903 and the post office was discontinued again on October 31, 1906. The development of Asher is often blamed for the demise of Avoca. Currently in the Avoca area are the Avoca Church of Christ, a cemetery, and a few homes.
