= Rock Island 1891 Old Beck =

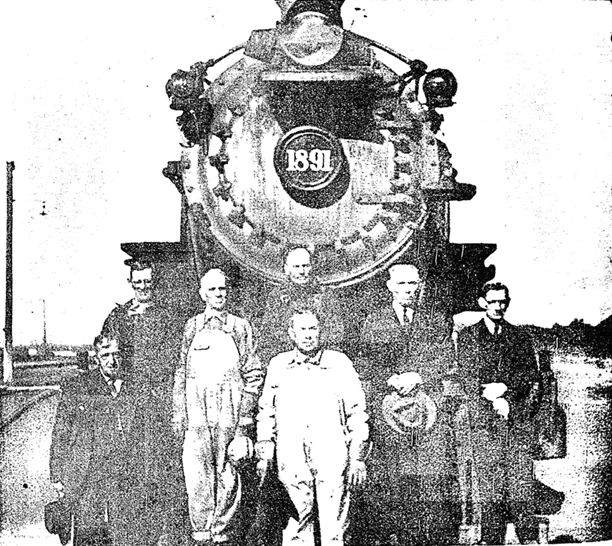
- "Old Beck" and crew: FH Grimes (shops night foreman), "Gus" Shock (engineer), Robert Archer (fireman), George Pretty (Supt. at Shawnee shops), JA Gordon (machinist), S Myton (conductor on Asher line), L Sterret (switchman)
Type and origin
- Power type: Steam
Specifications
- Configuration
  - Whyte: 2-8-0
- Gauge: 4 ft 8 1/2 in (1,435 mm)
Career
- Operators: Rock Island Railroad
- Numbers: 1891
- Nicknames: Old Beck
- Locale: Oklahoma

Old Beck was the nickname of a steam locomotive that ran on Rock Island Railroad’s 25-mile branch between Shawnee and Asher, Oklahoma.

== History of the branch ==
Three corporations operated the Shawnee-Asher branch during its 40-year history. The first five miles, from Shawnee to Tecumseh (which at this time was the county seat), was built in 1896 by the Tecumseh Railway Co. Cost of construction was not recorded. On October 12, 1900, the Choctaw, Oklahoma and Gulf Railroad (COG) bought the property and franchise for $12,000 and promptly built 20 more miles of railroad to extend the branch to Asher, up to the bank of the South Canadian River. Cost of the extension is recorded as $422,873. Rock Island took over operations on March 24, 1904. Total investment in the branch over the years is estimated at $451,103.

=== Route ===
The branch began in Shawnee and traveled through Thackery, Tecumseh, Romulus and Pearson before arriving in Asher. In its prime, Old Beck would arrive in Asher at 4:00 each day carrying goods, groceries pharmaceuticals and the like. The train would stay the night in Asher and leave early the next morning carrying cotton, wood, cattle and passengers back to Shawnee.

=== Decline ===
In the oil boom days of 1927 through 1930, Old Beck ran every day and freights shuttled as often as five times daily down to Tecumseh, Pearson and Asher. However, starting in 1936, Rock Island reported operating deficits. Passenger transportation dwindled, down to none in 1940.

The train schedule was reduced to three days a week until May 8, 1939, when only one weekly trip was made. Toward the end, the train only came out on call—when enough freight accumulated or there was a special request. Service on the branch ended February 10, 1942.
