= Donald Pratt =

Irish cricketer and businessman

Personal information
- Full name: Donald Montague McVeagh Pratt
- Born: 9 July 1935 (age 91); Dublin, Leinster, Ireland
- Batting: Left-handed
- Relatives: George McVeagh (uncle)

Domestic team information
- Years: Team
- 1963–1966: Ireland

Career statistics
Competition	First-class
Matches	6
Runs scored	171
Batting average	14.25
100s/50s	–/2
Top score	58
Balls bowled	0
Wickets	–
Bowling average	–
5 wickets in innings	–
10 wickets in match	–
Best bowling	–
Catches/stumpings	–/–
- Source: Cricinfo, 26 October 2018

Donald Montague McVeagh Pratt (born 9 July 1935) is an Irish businessman and former first-class cricketer and squash player.

== Biography ==
Born at Dublin, Pratt was educated in the city at Sandford Park School and St Columba's College. He later studied at Trinity College Dublin, where he played cricket for Dublin University Cricket Club. After completing his studies, Pratt moved into the legal profession as a solicitor. Playing his club cricket in Dublin for Phoenix, he made his debut in first-class cricket for Ireland against Scotland at Derry in 1963. He played five further first-class matches for Ireland, appearing against the Marylebone Cricket Club (MCC) in 1964, the touring New Zealanders, Scotland, and Hampshire in 1965, and the MCC in 1966. He scored 171 run in these six matches, averaging 14.25. He had just two innings of note where he passed fifty, with a highest score of 58 against the New Zealanders at Belfast.

Pratt was also a noted squash player, winning the Irish Squash Championship for ten years in a row and representing Ireland at international level.

He stopped working as a solicitor in 1974, when he and his wife purchased Avoca Handweavers, a County Wicklow business dating back to 1723. By 2006, the company had eight stores in Ireland and one in the United States, and employed 475 people.
