= Avoca Township, Pottawatomie County, Oklahoma =

Coordinates: 35°01′N 96°55′W

Avoca Township
- Township
- Interactive map of Avoca Township
- Country: United States
- State: Oklahoma
- County: Pottawatomie
- Established: Late 1800s

Area
  - Total: 75 sq mi (190 km^{2})
- Time zone: UTC-6 (CST)
  - Summer (DST): UTC-5 (CDT)

Avoca Township was located in Pottawatomie County, Oklahoma. It should not be confused with Avoca, which was a smaller community inside the township.

== Location ==
Avoca township was located in southeastern Pottawatomie County, with Konawa Municipal Township (and the Seminole County line) to the east, St. Louis Township to the north and the South Canadian River to the south. The western boundary was about two and a half miles west of present-day Asher. The township encompassed about 75 square miles (190 km^{2}). Post offices in the Avoca Township area included:

Town	Post Office Dates
Sacred Heart Mission	1879–1949
Osmit	1884–1887
Avoca (later Asher)	1894–present
Meanko	1896–1901
Boyer	1897–1900
Violet	1899–1905

== Statistics ==
The following table shows the population grown and then decline of Avoca Township. The population decline beginning in 1920 can be attributed to a growing interest in Shawnee, OK, in the northern part of the county.

Year	Households	Individuals	Home Owners	Home Renters	Housing Not Specified
1900	390	2,156	178	212	0
1910	808	4,228	413	139	0
1920	628	3,204	288	272	68

== Schools in the township ==
Schools in the township (and what is known about them) include:

- Asher (c. 1913–present). Asher is and was the only high school developed within the township. See Asher, Oklahoma.
- Avoca (1892 - ?). Avoca had a small school near what is now the cemetery. See Avoca, Oklahoma
- Cook (1892 - aft. 1920). The school, originally one-room, was formed in 1892 and later expanded when a second and larger room was added. At some point between 1910 and 1920, the building was completely refurbished and again enlarged. It is believed this school was located near the Pottawatomie-Seminole county line.
- Gravel Hill School (1903 - ?). This school replaced Lazell School.
- Lazzell (1895–1903). This school, housed in a log cabin, was located two and a half miles east of Asher, near Chisholm Springs. It began around December 1895 and closed in April 1903 (due to financial shortfalls, there was no school 1899–1900). It was replaced by Gravel Hill School.

Teacher	Year
Miss Alice Shelton	1895–1897
Miss Mollie Ferrell	1898
Mr. Willis	1898–1899
J.G. Hudiburg	1899
No School	1899–1900
F. M. Forston	1900–1903

- Sacred Heart. The school had a small enrollment.
