= Avoca railway station (Ireland) =

Closed railway station, County Wicklow, Ireland

Avoca
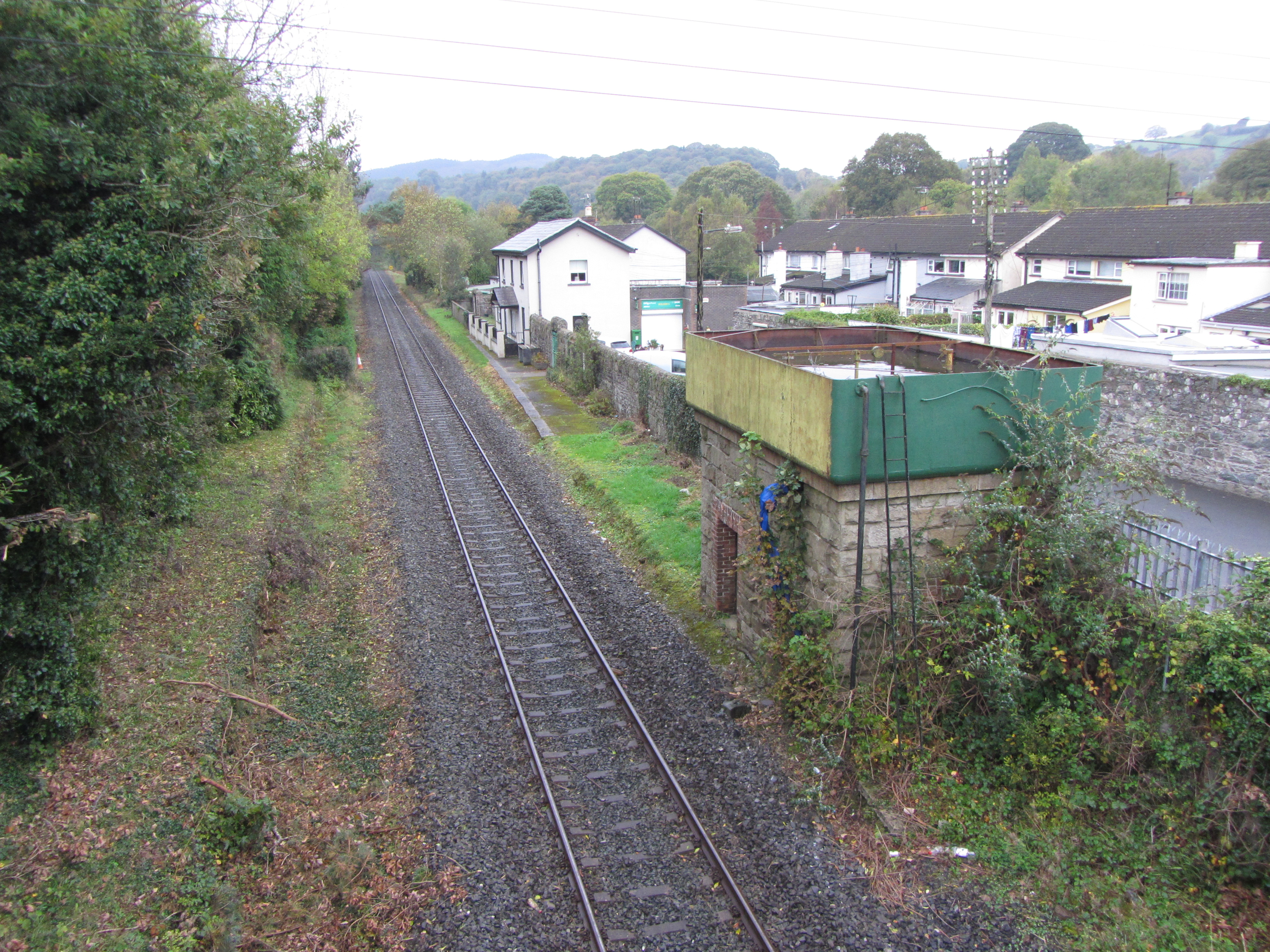
- The closed station at Avoca

General information
- Location: Avoca, County Wicklow; Ireland
- Coordinates: 52.85752°N 6.21495°W

Other information
- Status: closed

History
- Opened: 18 July 1863
- Closed: 30 March 1964
Location

Avoca railway station served the town of Avoca in County Wicklow. The station was known as Ovoca until 1912. It opened on 18 July 1863 and was closed on 30 March 1964 except for special excursions. In the 2022, Irish Rail launched a study into reopening the station. The study, published in 2025, found there was insufficient demand to reopen it.
