= Avoca, Louisville =

Neighborhood in Louisville, Kentucky

Coordinates: 38.2565°N 85.5002°W

Avoca is a neighborhood of Louisville, Kentucky centered along Aiken Road and Chenoweth Run watershed.
