= River Avoca =

River in County Wicklow, Ireland

Coordinates: 52°52′59″N 6°13′47″W

River Avoca Abhainn Abhóca
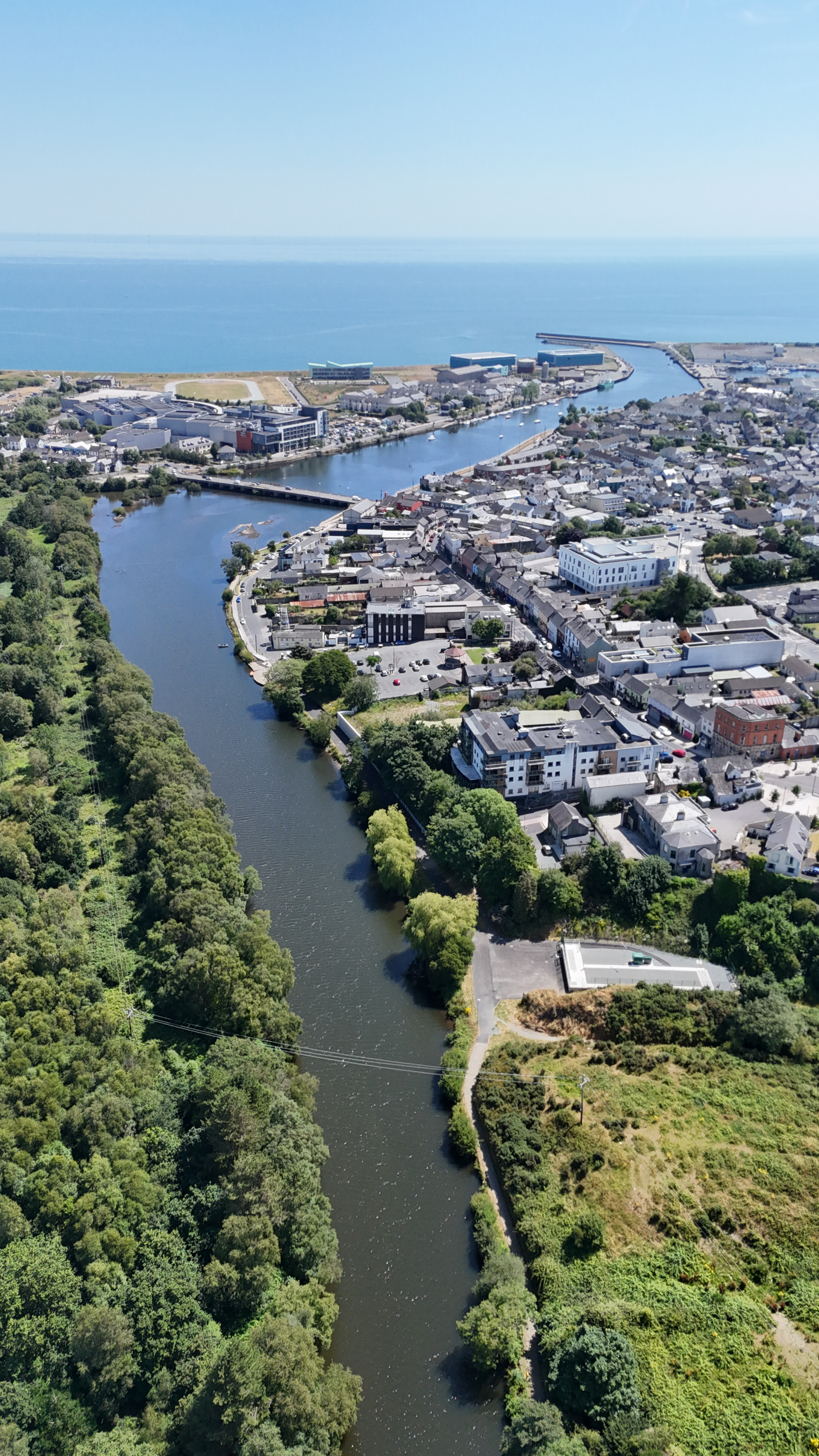
- River Avoca entering the sea at Arklow.
- Etymology: From the Oboka, which appears in Ptolemy's Geography

Physical characteristics
- Source
  - location: The Meeting of the Waters, County Wicklow.
- Mouth
  - location: Irish Sea at Arklow
- Discharge
  - average: 18 m^{3}/s (640 cu ft/s)

Basin features
- Tributaries
  - right: River Aughrim

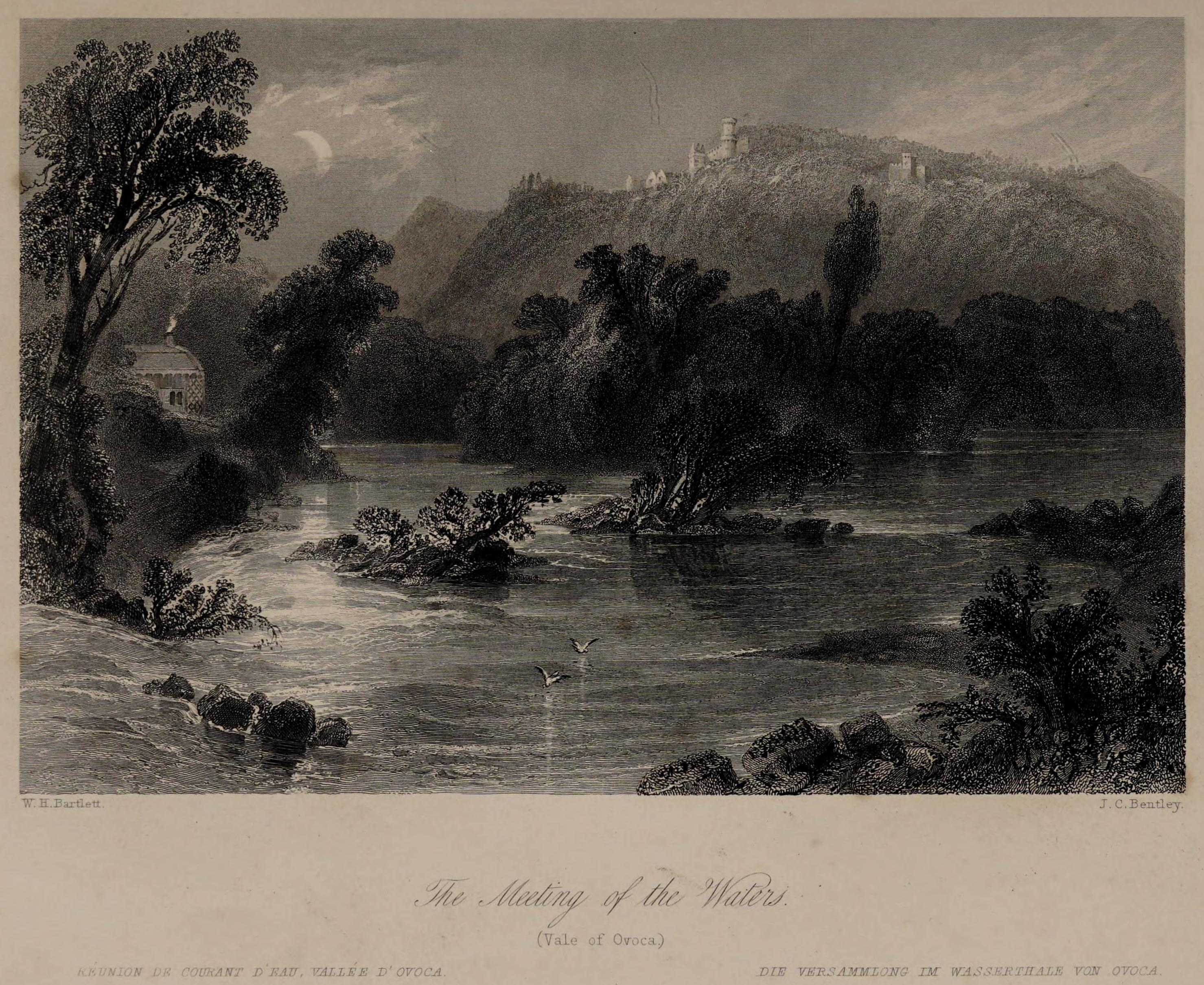
The view in Moore's time.

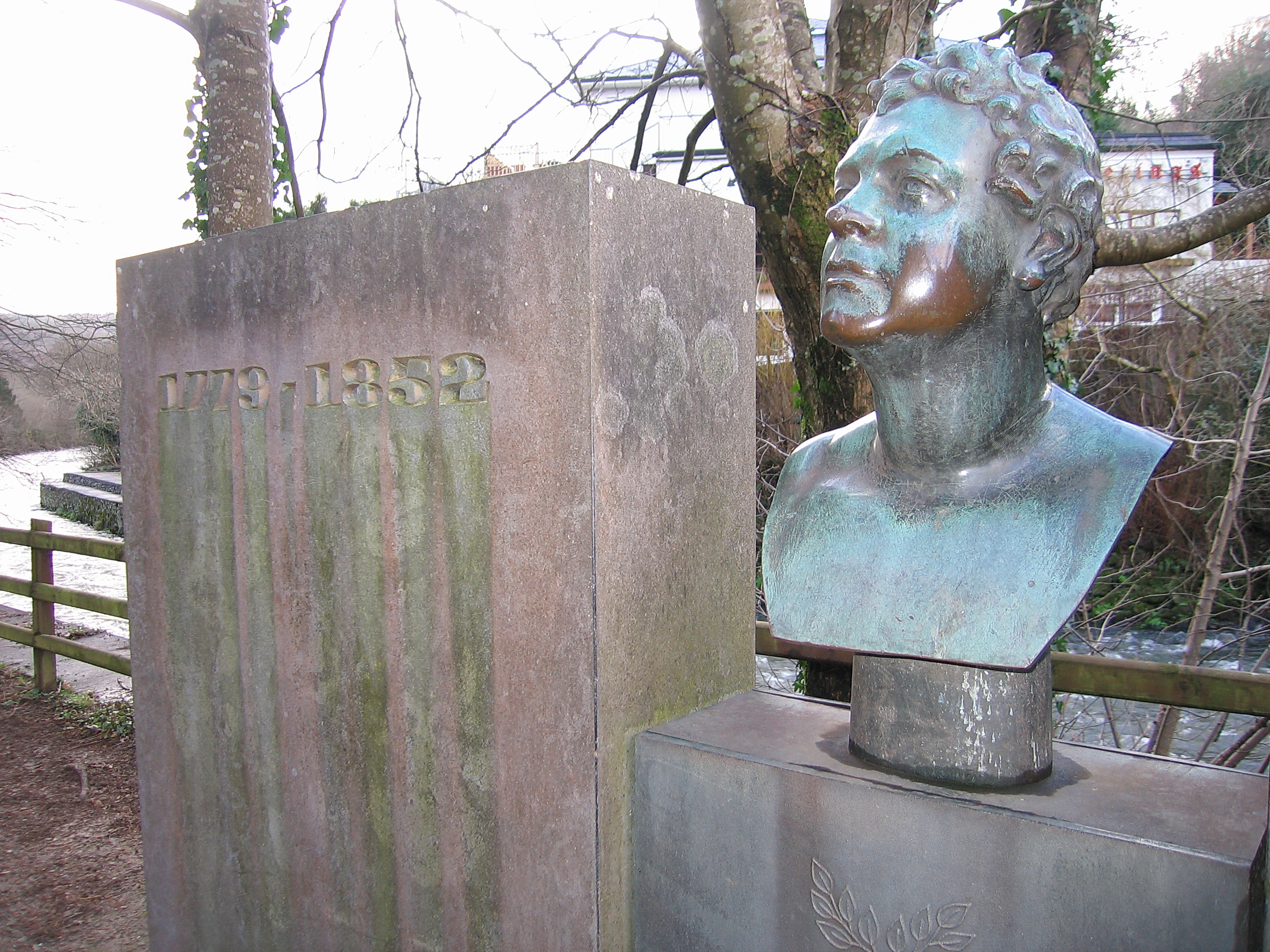
Thomas Moore at the Meeting of the Waters.

The Avoca (Irish: Abhainn Abhóca) is a river in County Wicklow, Ireland. It is contained completely within the county. Its length is 35 miles (56.3 km).

The Avoca starts life as two rivers, the Avonmore (Irish: Abhainn Mhór, meaning 'Big River') and the Avonbeg (Irish: Abhainn Bheag, meaning 'Small River'). These join at a spot called the Meeting of the Waters (Cumar an dá Uisce) in the Vale of Avoca, which is considered a local beauty spot, and was celebrated by Thomas Moore in his song of the same name.

There is not in the wide world a valley so sweet,

As the vale in whose bosom the bright waters meet;
Oh, the last rays of feeling and life must depart,

Ere the bloom of that valley shall fade from my heart.

The village of Avoca is situated on the river.

The Avoca flows into the Irish Sea at Arklow where it widens into a large estuary, giving Arklow its Irish language name an t-Inbhear Mór (the big inlet). The catchment area of the Avoca is 652 km^{2}. The long term average flow rate of the Avoca is 20.2 cubic metres per second (m^{3}/s)

== Name ==
The Avoca was originally called Abhainn Mhór / Abhainn Dé (great river/God's river); the present name was derived from Oboka (Greek: Οβοκα), the name of a river in Ptolemy's Geography, which was thought to correspond to the Avoca (Ovoca).

== Industry ==
The valley of the Avoca has a large copper mine, and further downstream was the NET fertiliser factory (closed since 2002). These are said to have contributed greatly to pollution in the lower reaches of the river.

== Transport ==
The railway line from Dublin to Rosslare also passes along the Vale of Avoca, cutting inland from its mainly coastal route and the R752 road tightly follows the west bank of the Avoca from The Meetings to Arklow.

== See also ==
- Rivers of Ireland

== Notes ==
- Chisholm, Hugh, ed. (1911). "Avoca, Vale of" . Encyclopædia Britannica. Vol. 3 (11th ed.). Cambridge University Press. p. 66.
