= Wicklow gold rush =

1795 gold rush in County Wicklow, Ireland

Wicklow Gold Rush
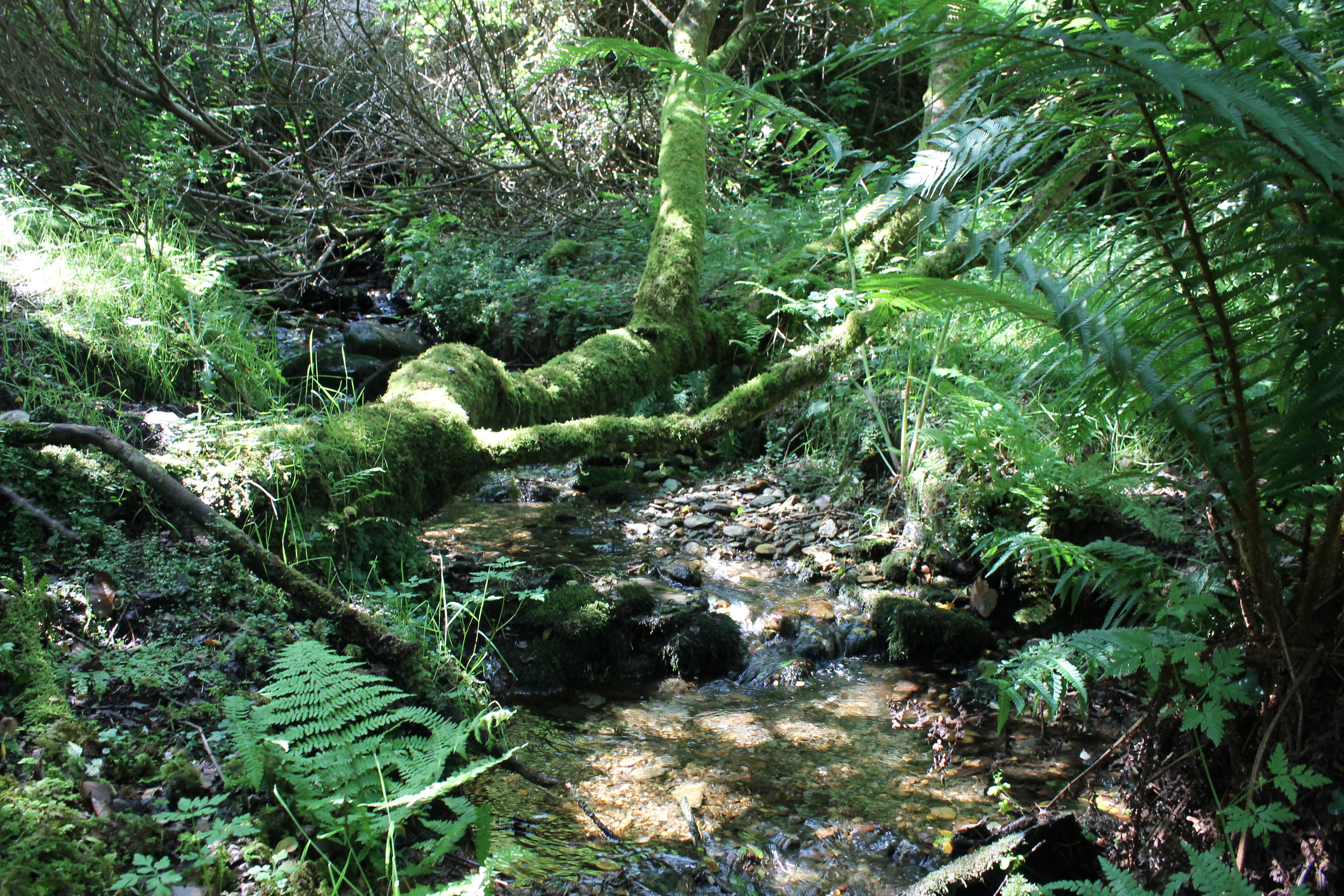
- The Goldmines River, the focus of attention during the gold rush
- Centre: Goldmines River (specifically in the vicinity of the bridge at Ballinagore), near Woodenbridge, County Wicklow, Ireland
- Coordinates: 52.806354°N 6.292823°W
- Start date: 15 September 1795; 231 years ago
- End date: 15 October 1795
- Discovery: 15 September 1795, northern slopes of Croghan Kinsella mountain
- Discoverers: A group of workers felling timber on the estate of Lord Carysfort
- Announcement of find: The 16-19 September 1795 edition of Finn's Leinster Journal, and wider exposure in a letter printed in The Freeman's Journal on 29 September
- Prospectors: Over 4,000 people onsite by 11 October 1795, prospectors and daytrippers
- Extraction: Over four weeks as much as 80 kilograms of gold recovered

The Wicklow gold rush, or the Avoca gold rush, was a gold rush that began on 15 September 1795, following the discovery of gold on the northern slopes of Croghan Kinsella mountain, County Wicklow, Ireland. The unregulated period of gold collection ended with a military takeover exactly one month later, on 15 October 1795. Over the four week period, as much as 80 kilograms of gold was recovered by prospectors. It was the only recorded gold rush to have occurred on the island of Ireland.

== History ==
=== Background ===
Ireland was the major area of gold working in Bronze Age Britain and Ireland, with Irish gold being especially well known from the Bronze Age as jewellery in the form of gold lunulae, torcs, gorgets and rings.

The first gold produced in Ireland occurred c. 2500 BC during the late Neolithic/Atlantic Bronze Age, with a likely source for it having been placer mining in Ireland's rivers, including the rivers of County Wicklow and the "Gold Coast" of County Waterford. The National Museum of Ireland maintains that "although gold has been found in Ireland at a number of locations, particularly in County Wicklow and County Tyrone, it has not yet been possible to identify the ancient sources where gold was found", but that "the sites most likely to have been recognised and exploited by prehistoric people were alluvial deposits from rivers and streams".

The area around Woodenbridge where the future gold rush would occur was already traditionally known for mining, with the pits of East Avoca and their underlying workings having supported copper and sulphur production since the year 1720. The mining district in Avoca was, at that point, one of the richest in Europe, and by the 1770s, copper mines were shipping more than a hundred tons of ore annually from Wicklow. It would go on to become the most extensive mining operation in Ireland, remaining so until 1960 when it closed.

At the time, the gold was thought to have originated in a quartz vein in the mountain, but since then, studies by Riofinex in the 1990s determined that two separate bedrock sources were more likely - those of Kilmacoo-style sulphide ores, and Ballcoog-Moneyteige ironstone.

=== Discovery ===
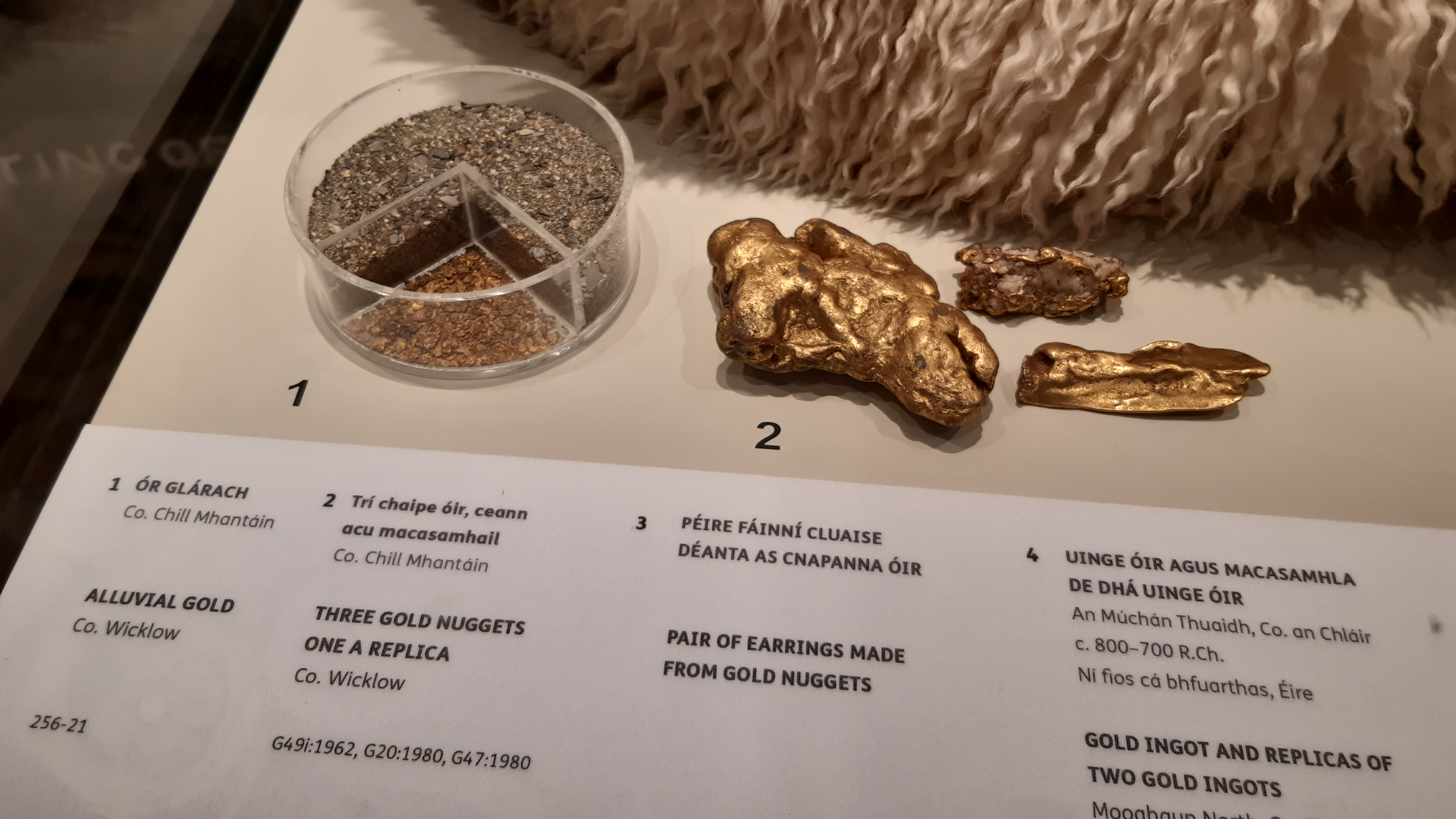
Alluvial gold and gold nuggets from County Wicklow on display at the National Museum of Ireland – Archaeology, Dublin

Various claims exist as to the nature of the gold discovery in County Wicklow that ignited the 1795 gold rush. An article in New Scientist magazine claims it was a local schoolmaster named Dunaghoo (or Donaghoo) who, living beyond his means, was found to have been quietly panning the Aughatinavought River for sands containing grains of gold, which he had been selling to Dublin jewellers. McArdle also notes tales of a fisherman who, by chance, spotted a gold nugget in the river. Another story recounts how the river sediment had been worked surreptitiously by a local farming family since the 1780s, and that the family secret had been revealed by a disaffected member as revenge.

New Scientist claims that the Goldmines River was known as Aughatinavought before gold was found, however IrishCentral contends that the river was called 'Ballinvally' prior to the discovery, as does a 2021 video produced by the Wicklow Heritage Office.

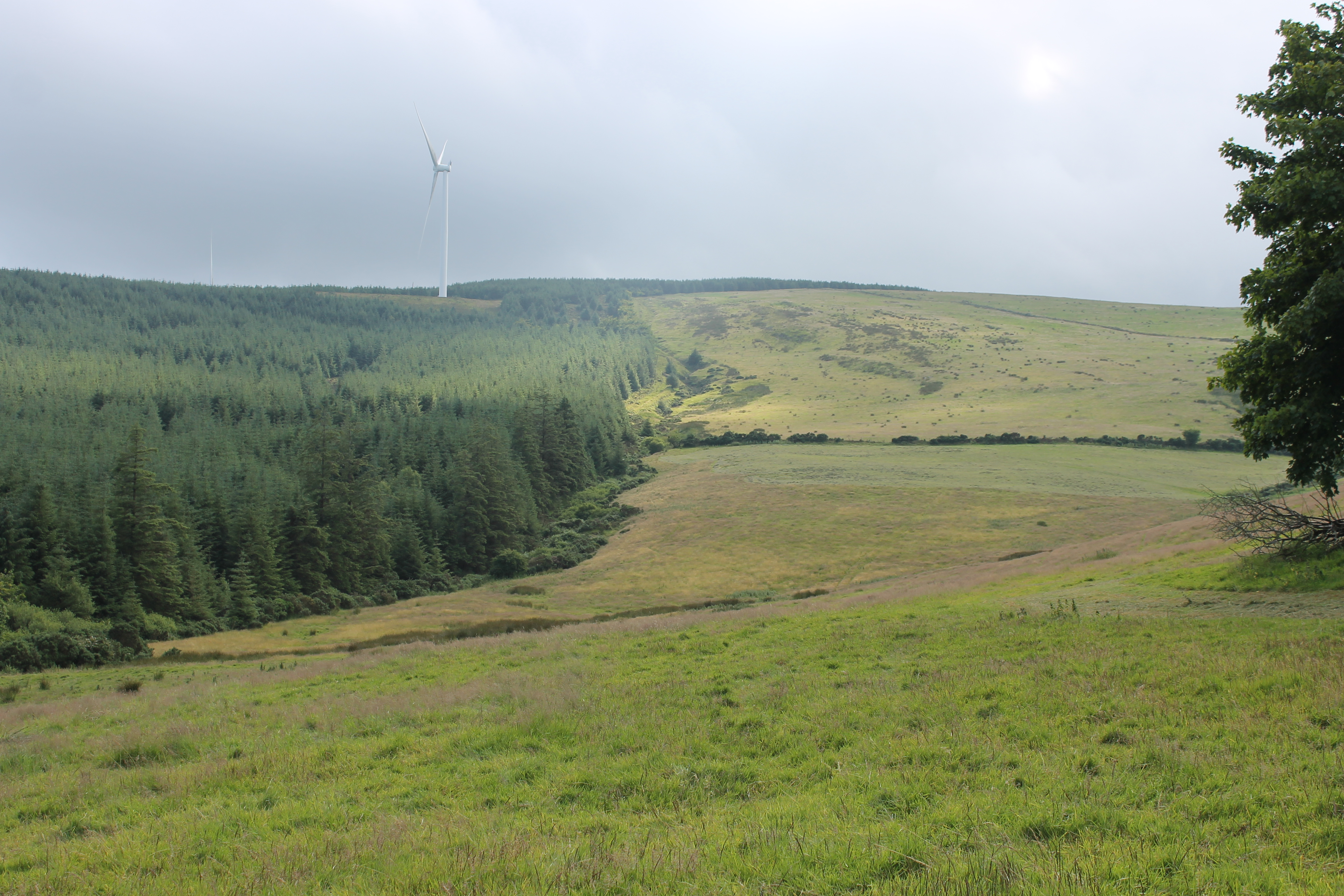
The northeastern slopes of Croghan Mountain (Croghan Kinsella)

It is known that on 15 September 1795, workers felling timber on the estate of Lord Carysfort noticed what appeared to be a piece of gold in the roots of an uprooted tree near Woodenbridge, County Wicklow. Gold was already known to exist in the area, as were other minerals in Avoca. As McArdle notes, this was "no pinhead speck of gold, but a half-ounce piece". "We can safely assume", according to McArdle, that "the workers immediately abandoned their tiresome labours on behalf of Lord Carysfort and devoted themselves wholeheartedly to their new gold mining enterprise". Gold was classed as a "Royal metal" (see: mineral rights), meaning that any found was supposed to belong by right to the Crown.

=== Announcement of find ===
Those closest to the story would have naturally been cautious to alert journalists to the find, to give themselves more time to pan, but as news spread by word of mouth, increasing numbers of prospectors arrived to the area with each passing day.

The first mention of the gold find in the Freeman's Journal was a letter from Rathdrum dated 29 September 1795 which also subsequently appeared in Finn's Leinster Journal and Saunder's News-Letter. However, Finn's Leinster Journal had broken the story proper in its edition of 16-19 September in which it described the accidental discovery of the tree-fellers, but had a smaller readership than the bigger newspapers. The gold was reported to be pure, "as pure as any brought from the Gold Coast of Africa", but it is unknown whether the gold was being properly assayed by this early stage. As McArdle notes:

One labourer was reported to have made ten guineas in two days, equivalent to more than 2.5 ounces of gold at prevailing prices (unless a premium had been paid for what probably included spectacular specimens)

By the end of September 1795, local correspondents were still supplying detailed and technically accurate reports to the newspaper offices from onsite at the Goldmines River, but as the weeks progressed, the journalists from the head offices were making the trip out to see the rush for themselves, tempted by the excitement.

=== Gold rush ===
Soon word reached the populated centres that gold was to be had for free and by 8 October 1795, over 1,000 people had congregated on the banks of the Goldmines River. 250-300 of these people were actively digging, while women engaged in reworking the spent gravel using bowls, which could produce previously unnoticed gold grains the size of "snipe shot".

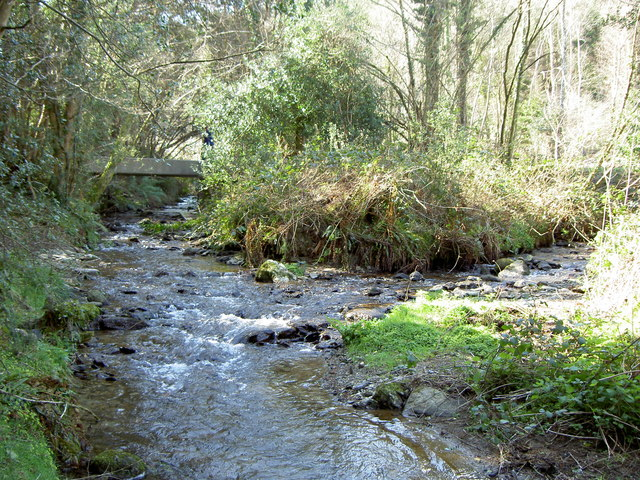
Confluence of the Goldmines River and a tributary

We may assume, according to McArdle, that many came from within a 15km radius or thereabouts, so that it would have been possible for them to return home each evening after panning the river. This would encompass the residents of Arklow and Aughrim as well as miners lured from the nearby Avoca copper mines (although it is worth noting that these workings were not abandoned during the gold rush). Others would have naturally travelled from Dublin, the nearest big city, and might have camped or lodged locally while engaged in their work. One person interviewed in the Freeman's Journal reflected how fortunate it had been for the country that the gold rush had come only after the harvest had been saved, "otherwise not a labourer could be engaged".

The business was extremely lucrative for whoever had the time and patience to devout hours and hours onsite panning the river, especially at the early stages of the find. As McArdle relays, "at 22 karats fine, the gold would have been sold at the prevailing price of about £4 per ounce - and sellers of the most spectacular specimens were reported to be demanding as much as £5 an ounce".

Gold is extremely dense. "It is very good at collecting in only certain places in a river, and the art of prospecting is working out where those places are, a bit like fishing", according to geologist Rob Chapman. The most fertile section for finding gold in the Goldmines River was found to be in a place named 'The Red Hole', situated below Ballinagore Bridge, which became the most coveted place to work. Stream banks were cut back steeply there, and along the whole river, by avid diggers in their attempt to find deposits.

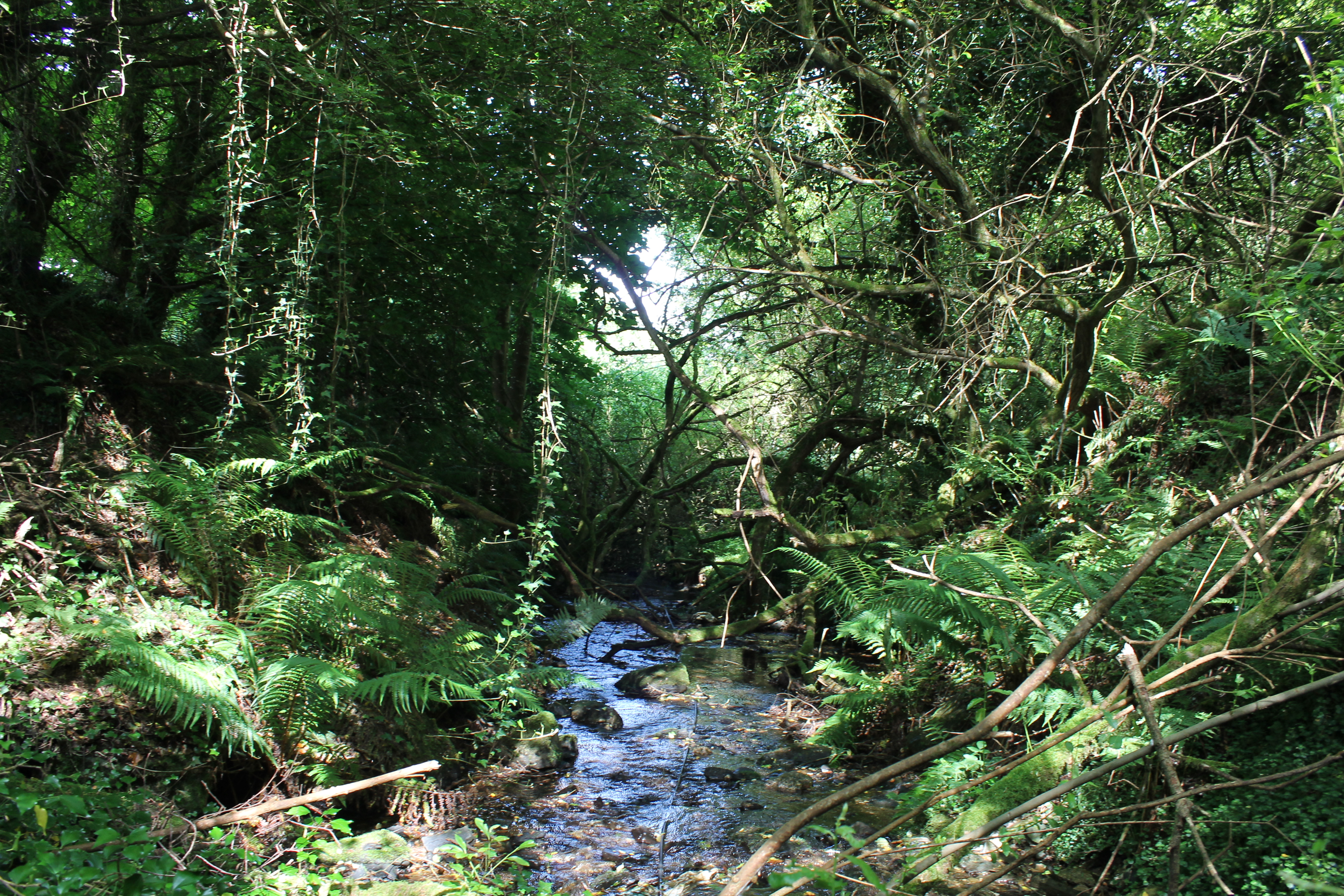
The Goldmines River, just downstream of Ballinagore Bridge

"...they work with whatever instruments they can get, picks, spades, shovels, case knives, iron spoons, hay, bits of slate; as yet they have not got deeper than two feet and a half in any one place; from the awkward manner in which they work, they must have left treble as much behind them as they got, for they do not half clean or work the clay and gravel...

...the search for gold (has) been directed... with astonishing success, as many thousand ounces have been attained... by the surrounding peasantry. Who are totally ignorant of minerology"

— Contemporary newspaper report

Considering the temporary nature of a gold rush, it was considered too inefficient for prospectors to work individually, and so teams of up to eight members were being formed which could process larger volumes of materials faster. Working in teams also made the process of panning less dangerous, as the creation of unconsolidated cliffs of earth at the banks of the stream were at risk of collapse onto those below. Territorial arguments could also break out between rival groups. Each group also assigned a treasurer, who was trusted to take care of any recovered gold and negotiate its sale. Teams worked the river by night and day to retain the plot of river they had claimed, and to make the most of the time available as rumours spread of an imminent Government take-over.

Despite the excitement of the gold rush, the general order of society carried on largely as normal in the area, with Saunder's News-Letter of 5 October noting that "The fairs at Arklow and Rathdrum were numerously attended last week and had a large quantity of woollen goods for sale". English and French eyewitnesses wrote of "mountain Tartars", assaulting the mountain's "ruffian bowels" and washing what they found in "a rude manner, somewhat similar to that practised by the negroes of Africa".

By the 11 October 1795, the number of people onsite at the river had swelled to 4,000, although the majority were there for diversion. An "irregular encampment" was erected to cater for their "reception and entertainment", and as McArdle notes, "there must have been a real carnival atmosphere (onsite), probably with many entertainers soliciting contributions from onlookers. Sellers of food and drinks (including ale and whiskey) must have done a roaring trade", as it is not uncommon for traders to do at least as well as the gold workers themselves during a gold rush.

Newspaper correspondents reported of willing gold buyers stationed at the river, "armed with accurate weighing scales and plenty of ready cash", which would have been a tempting sight for workers. According to McArdle, more determined prospectors probably transported their gold to Dublin goldsmiths where more favourable prices could be attained, and a greater selection of buyers. One jeweller from Dublin even travelled out to the site where he "spent a week" and returned to Dublin "in possession of a 14-ounce nugget".

Human interest stories from the workings of the river began to fill the Irish newspapers, detailing tragic loss or miraculous success. One story centred around a boy from the workhouse who found a nugget valued at more than £17, and sold it to a "humane gentleman", who also included a cow for the child's mother in the bargain. Apart from the Goldmines River, gold was also to be found in the nearby Coolbawn and Clone rivers. The 10 October 1795 edition of Saunder's News-Letter reported of one William Graham Esq, living near 'Aghrim' (Aughrim), who "lodged with the assay master of this city, thirty-five ounces and five pennyweights of gold, the produce of the gold mine in his neighbourhood, for the purpose of being assayed".

A later correspondent on the scene compared the Goldmines River minerals to those found in European gold mines, mentioning Hungarian quartz and Transylvanian pyrite in particular; the gold in the latter case being "extracted out of the pyrites, although none at first (appeared) visible to the naked eye". McArdle states that the correspondent mentioned these locations with the intention of suggesting that the Goldmines River might feature "just as lucratively among the world's gold operations in the immediate future", depending on the area first being secured by the authorities, and the mother lode located. Some reporters even believed that the "golden mountain (would) be a most important source of national prosperity" in the years to come. Alborn contends that some in Ireland may have even hoped that Wicklow's "untapped gold reserves might hold the key to their nation's independence from Britain."

"So important a discovery as this to the nation, cannot be contemplated without opening a wide field of conjecture as to its political consequences on the country; it is not however the least flattering idea, arising on the subject, that the bowels of the wild and barren mountains of old Ireland, at the close of the eighteenth century, should be discovered to contain a specific remedy for those inveterate diseases of the body politic, which philosophers and politics have so long viewed with horror, namely the public debt of the Empire — the African trade, and the growing necessity of taxation"

— Article published in Saunder's News-Letter, 13 October 1795, pg. 2

The correspondent stated that he had seen many of the gold specimens at Wicklow personally, and that they were typically bright yellow, smooth and polished, although some were angular and jagged. One quartz sample he studied had been encrusted with gold, "as if it had been melted and poured on it...". McArdle speculates that the correspondent may have been the geologist Thomas Weaver (1773-1855), who had studied at the Bergakademie Freiberg in Germany and consequently would have been familiar with the central European mining deposits of Hungary and Romania.

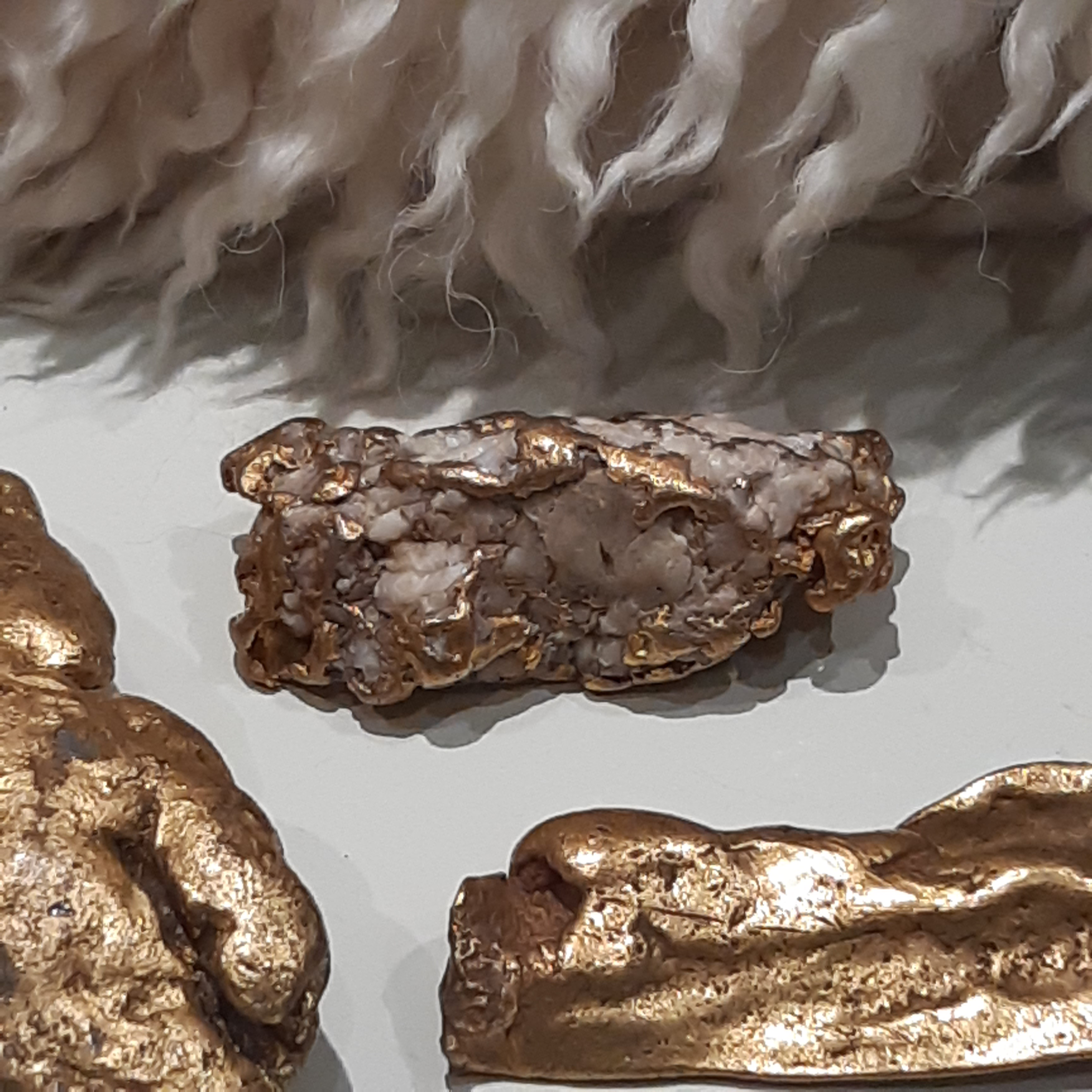
Gold-encrusted quartz specimen from County Wicklow on display at the National Museum of Ireland – Archaeology, Dublin

Contemporary newspapers compared the findings at Wicklow to Potosí in Bolivia, at that point the world's largest silver deposit that has been mined since the sixteenth century, and also became a valuable sources of tin from the 1790s. Although Potosí was a source of silver and not gold, it gave the public an idea of the fabulous wealth that could lay in store for Ireland, and one which they could easily identify with.

It is impossible to determine just how much gold was recovered during the unregulated part of the Wicklow gold rush, such is the chaotic and frantic nature of such events. In addition to this, many prospectors typically refuse to acknowledge their finds, whereas others will exaggerate what they found, but McArdle speculates that over the four weeks as much as 80 kilograms of gold was recovered, "perhaps more than a quarter of all the gold that would eventually be found" at the site.

=== Specimens ===
The Wicklow gold rush was one of the earliest, and its nuggets became prized possessions in many museums, including the Natural History Museum, London and Royal Museum, Edinburgh. McArdle notes that while Wicklow's nuggets attracted much interest in their time, today they hardly rate in comparison with those since found elsewhere, such as the Welcome Stranger and Welcome Nugget, both unearthed in Australia in the mid-1800s.

One of the most famous nuggets from the gold rush, a 22oz piece (0.75kg), was bought for £18.12s and donated by Abraham Coates and Turner Camac to the reigning monarch (George III) in early 1796, who reputedly had it made into a snuff box. Several models of the nugget were made soon after its discovery, examples of which were (by 2011) in the possession of the National Museum of Ireland, the Geological Survey of Ireland and the Natural History Museum, London. Valentine Ball, the nineteenth century geologist, contacted Windsor Castle in the 1890s to obtain information as to the existence of the object, but to no avail.

=== Government takeover ===
According to Alborn, "Gold was indisputably Britain's national metal: through 1797, and again from 1821 through the end of the century, it formed the basis of the country's currency, and in the intervening years British gold reserves bankrolled its defeat of France". Most of the gold that circulated in Britain at this time was taken from Spain's plunder of Mexico and Peru two centuries earlier, whereas the remainder was sourced from Indonesia, Brazil and the Gold Coast. Alborn asserts that the potential new supply of the metal from Ireland offered the possibility of removing the "barbaric taint that Milton had attached to the metal in Paradise Lost (1667)", if a local source could be secured.

The political situation in Ireland was already tense in the run up to what would eventually break out in the 1798 Rebellion, and the discovery of gold "coincided with a high-water mark of Irish separatism", according to Alborn. Dublin Castle was reviewing its options throughout the gold rush, and kept Westminster briefed at the highest levels. The Lord Lieutenant of Ireland, Lord Camden, wrote to the Prime Minister, The Duke of Portland, in London on 8 October 1795 informing him of the scale and impact of the discovery:

The Quantities now collected are very considerable, many lumps weighing several ounces. Booths are erected for the sale of whiskey, and a Spirit of animosity begins already to appear among the different parties employed in gathering the ore".

Lord Camden reported that he had ensured that "the Collector of the King's Revenues for the District of Wicklow (had taken) charge of the mine, with the assistance of a military force, to prevent the plunder of the ore and to preserve the peace of the County". He hoped that "some sort of judgement may be formed upon the probable importance of this discovery and upon the measures to be taken in consequence thereof. And I request your Grace's speedy instructions for my conduct".

A Colonel Craddock visited the site on Sunday 11 October 1795, and felt in the thronging mass of people that "it was only a small further step to open revolt". Dublin Castle's response was rapid, and Finn's Leinster Journal reported that on Friday 16 October "a party of soldiers left Dublin to take possession of the gold workings in His Majesty's name and force workers to return to their previous occupations". An account in Saunder's News-Letter indicates that the military actually took possession of the gold workings on Thursday 15 October 1795, meaning the rush lasted exactly one month from the date gold was first discovered:

The mines at Little Peru, otherwise Croghan Mountain, were taken possession of on Thursday last, on behalf of his Majesty. Major Browne, of the Royal Engineers, attended by Mr Coates, Port Surveyor of Wicklow, marched two companies of the Kildare militia from the Barrack of Arklow, towards the place where the gold is got; but with great judgement (sic) and propriety, on consultation with that active and spirited Magistrate, Thomas King Esq, it was judged proper to send a constable before them to read a proclamation, and advise the crowd to disperse and leave the ground. In an hour, afterward the Major, accompanied by Mr King, My Hayes, Sub-Sheriff, who readily attended, and Mr Coates, marched the army, about 68 men rank and file, to the place, when the crowd immediately, without riot or resistance, dispersed. When men, who conduct themselves with such coolness, judgment (sic) and spirit, as those gentlemen did, support the law, there is no danger of opposition. It is much to the credit of the peasantry of the county of Wicklow, that not the slightest opposition had been given to the execution of the law; that county is not cursed with disloyal Defenders.

The exiled French royalist Jean-Louis de la Tocnaye, who was visiting Wicklow and working on a travelogue was pleased the military had finally brought order, speculating that "all the vagabonds of the three kingdoms... would have probably plundered the neighbouring houses" once the gold had run out.

By the following Tuesday, 20 October, 200 military personnel were in position to maintain law and order onsite, 15 of whom were on guard at any given time, patrolling the ground and ensuring the "peasantry" were excluded from working the river. The purpose of the exercise was explicit:

"...as well to put an end to the mania of gold finding, and confusion and idleness among the people, as to secure the wealth therein for his Majesty, to whom all such so discovered, of right belongs."

The military constructed a small barracks in the valley, the ruins of which were still visible as of 2011.

== Government workings ==
The government took over workings thenceforth, but a decision on how best to manage the site was slow to come. Operations on behalf of the government began on 12 August 1796, operated by the engineers from Avoca. A lithograph of the mining scene prepared for members of the Irish House of Commons by artist Thomas Sautelle Roberts indicated workings close to the Red Hole (below the bridge at Ballinagore) and continuing into the valley upstream of the bridge too. This print is the best known illustration of the gold workings.

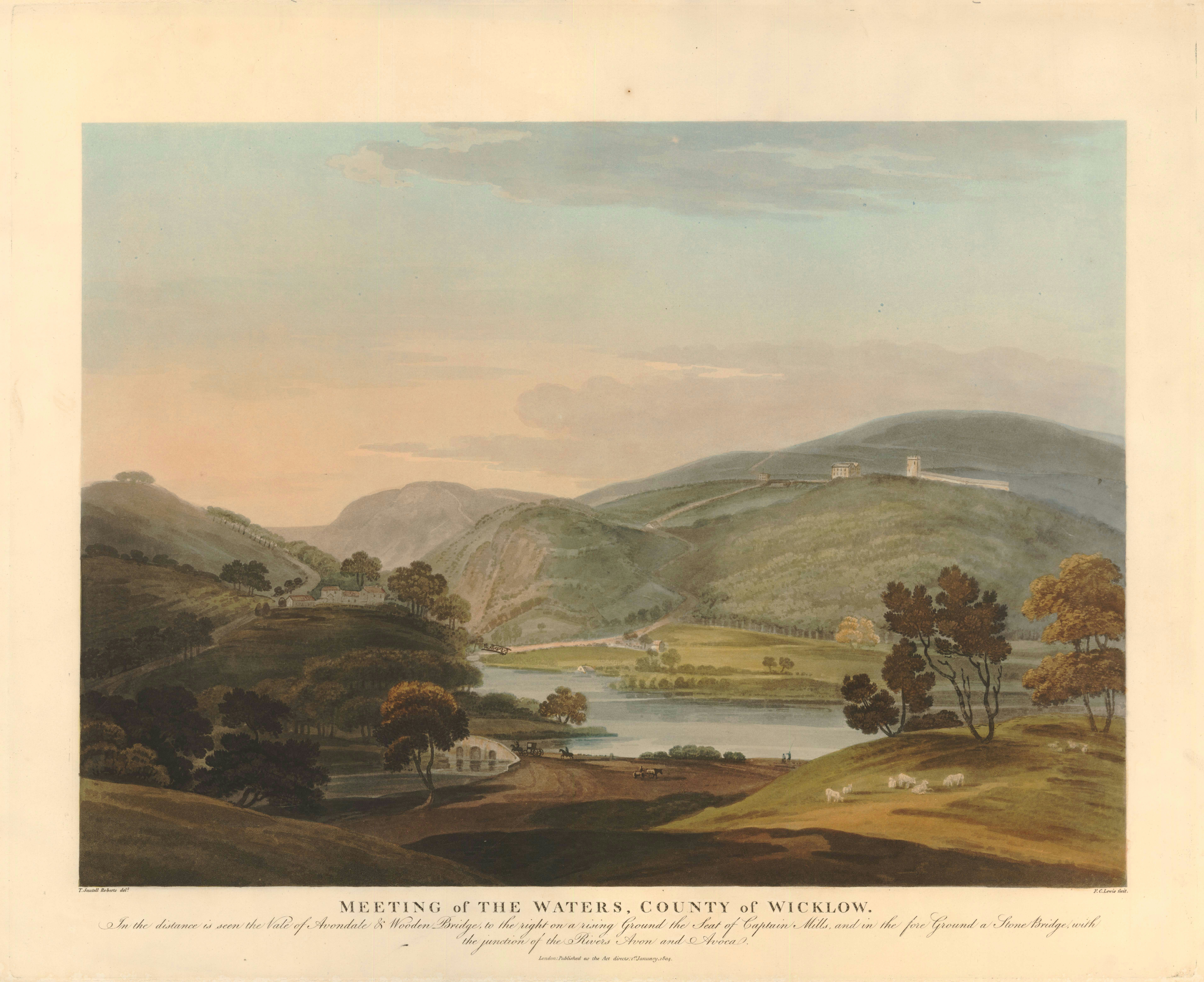
An engraving of a County Wicklow scene (1804) by Thomas Sautelle Roberts, close to the site of the gold rush, and presumably similar in style to that presented to the Irish House of Commons

The first technical report to emerge from the workings were published in the Philosophical Transactions of the Royal Society of London for the year 1796, authored by Abraham Mills Esq. (manager of the Cronebane Copper Mines at Avoca), Thomas King and Thomas Weaver. The report was also reprinted in the Transactions of the Dublin Society for 1801.

"...the rude manner in which the country people worked, seldom enabled them to penetrate to the rock, in those places where the sand and gravel were of any material depth... And from the slovenly and hasty way, in which their operations were performed, much gold most probably escaped their search; and indeed actually appears to have been the case, for since the late rains worked the clay and gravel, which had been thrown up, gold has been found lying on the surface..."

— Extract from Mills, King and Weaver's report (1796)

On 14 March 1797, the Chancellor of the Exchequer Sir John Parnell presented a Bill to enable the Lords of the Treasury to regulate the working of gold mines, which directed that the Wicklow gold be managed by the landowners themselves who would be obliged to return to the Treasury "a quantity of ore equal to what had been found to be the average". The Goldmines Act received the Royal Assent in April 1797, enabling the Treasury to "conduct the working of a gold mine in the County of Wicklow", essentially approving the state-sponsored mining that had already begun eight months earlier. The first ingot of gold was sold to the Bank of Ireland two months later.

By the time the 1798 Rebellion broke out in May of that year, another 17kg of gold had been profitably recovered, although workings had to cease because of the unrest. Many local workers abandoned the workings to join the rebels in the fighting that was breaking out across the country. While it was abandoned, according to McArdle, a party of militia went onsite and safely transported all the timber and materials back to Rathdrum, where they were used to fit out a barracks. Soon afterwards, "the rebels arrived and destroyed any buildings or workings remaining at the Goldmines River".

Works resumed in September 1800. Richard Kirwan, employed as the Inspector General of Mines, undertook a field visit to the site on 31 August 1801 at the behest of the Government. Kirwan published his own report, in which he voiced apprehensions about the idea of driving a 2.72km tunnel through the side of the mountain and out the other side, which had previously been considered. At the time, the gold was thought to have originated in a quartz vein in the mountain. Weaver did however open 12.8km of trenches down to bedrock, in the search for the "mother lode" on the mountain. None of the quartz veins returned any sign of gold particles, despite rigorous sampling and chemical analysis, which suggested no local source for the alluvial gold.

Weaver's post was terminated in 1803, with another 12kg of gold having been recovered from the workings since 1800. The governments in Dublin and London saw no potential for a viable gold mining operation, and the industry eventually petered out. To prevent opportunistic locals from returning to the river, a military presence was retained onsite until at least 1805, but probably withdrawn by 1807. There exists records of the Associated Irish Mine Company spending money in 1804 on "turf and straw for Gold Mines guard house".

== Later years ==
Since the gold rush of 1795, the rivers in the area have been worked on 14 different occasions producing between 7,400 and 9,000 troy oz. of gold, the equivalent of about 300 kilograms. According to Alborn, the Wicklow gold rush brought celebrity to the region, that would "persist intermittently through the nineteenth century".

In 1840, Messrs Crockford and Company were granted a 21-year lease to work the gold deposits surrounding Goldmines River, and shortly afterwards leased the workings to the 'Wicklow Gold Mine Company'. In April 1841, along with all other Irish metal mines, the Royal Commission of Inquiry into Children's Employment inspected conditions.

British geologist Warington Wilkinson Smyth conducted Irish surveys in 1845-1847, at the height of the Great Famine, and made the following notes at the site of the Goldmines River valley:

"The vestiges of the gold-washers are recognized in the confused heaps of stone, many of them overgrown with sod, which occur scattered along the banks of the streams".

Smyth considered the iron deposits of Ballycoog-Moneyteige to have been the bedrock source of alluvial gold in the area. Other contemporaries who wrote on the subject were John William Mallet, John Calvert and Roderick Murchison.

In the early 1900s, Maclaren proposed that the gold-enriched Avoca ores of the next valley further east might have also given rise to similar gold deposits.

According to a Geological Site Report of the river released in 2014 by the Geological Survey of Ireland, the site retained "no obvious features linking it to the era of the gold rush". The report noted that "the possibility of promoting this site as a themed, activity-based site centred on gold panning was considered, but is not recommended."

== Prospecting today ==
Gold grains, or flecks, can still be recovered by panning for gold in the rivers of Ireland, however, "If you were thinking of giving a beloved someone a special ring, from gold you yourself panned, it would take you two or three years at least," as per Gerry Stanley of the Royal Geological Society of Ireland in 2013:

"It is really a case of getting into the water and just processing the sediment, digging it and panning it to recover those small gold particles. It is hard labour (and) certainly not the case of just taking a few pans of gravel out".

Connemara Mining and Hendrick Resources began exploring the south Wicklow area for gold deposits in a joint venture in 2012 in the area of the Mine River licence block.

== Legacy ==
- Irish dramatist John O'Keeffe (1747–1833) was inspired by events to write a comic opera named "The Lad of the Hills; or, The Wicklow Gold Mine" which opened in April 1796 at the Theatre Royal, Covent Garden in London. The story focuses on the newly acquired and unexplained wealth of its main character.
- In 1796, the English poet Jane Elizabeth Moore wrote the poem "On the Discovery of The Gold Mine, in the County of Wicklow."

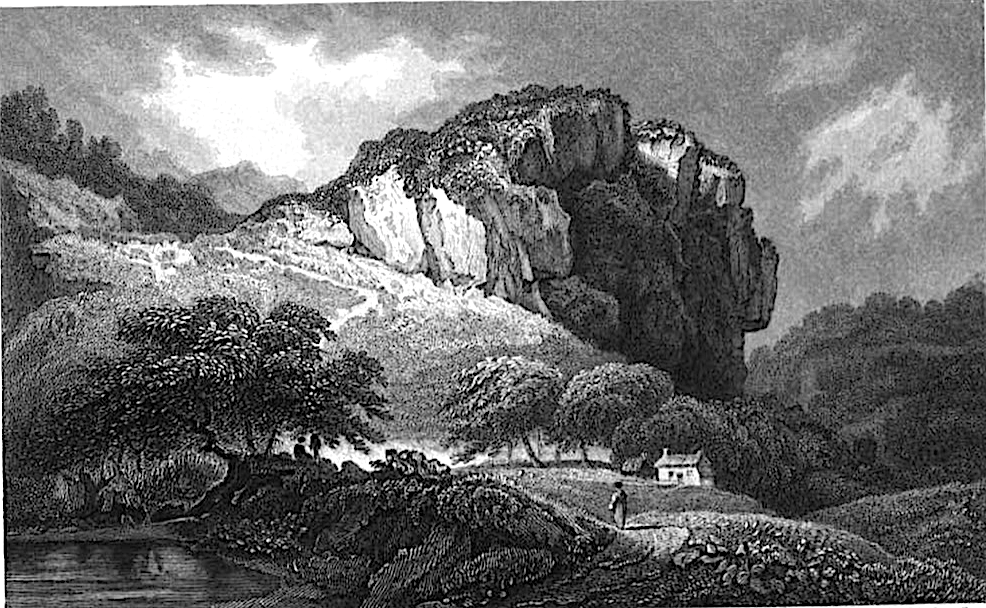
The Wicklow Gold Mines, an engraving by Samuel Rawle appearing in 'Landscape Illustrations Of Moore's Irish Melodies', 1835

- In the 1810s, Irish writer Thomas Moore alluded to the gold rush in his poem "Has Sorrow Thy Young Days Shaded", as did Lord Byron in his "Hints from Horace".
- Irish writer and broadcaster Tom McCaughren released a children's book in 1985 named The Children of the Forge, featuring the gold rush, and the role that the local schoolmaster Donaghoo supposedly played.
- The restaurant at the nearby Woodenbridge Hotel is named the Goldmines Bistro in reference to the river and the gold rush.

== Gallery ==
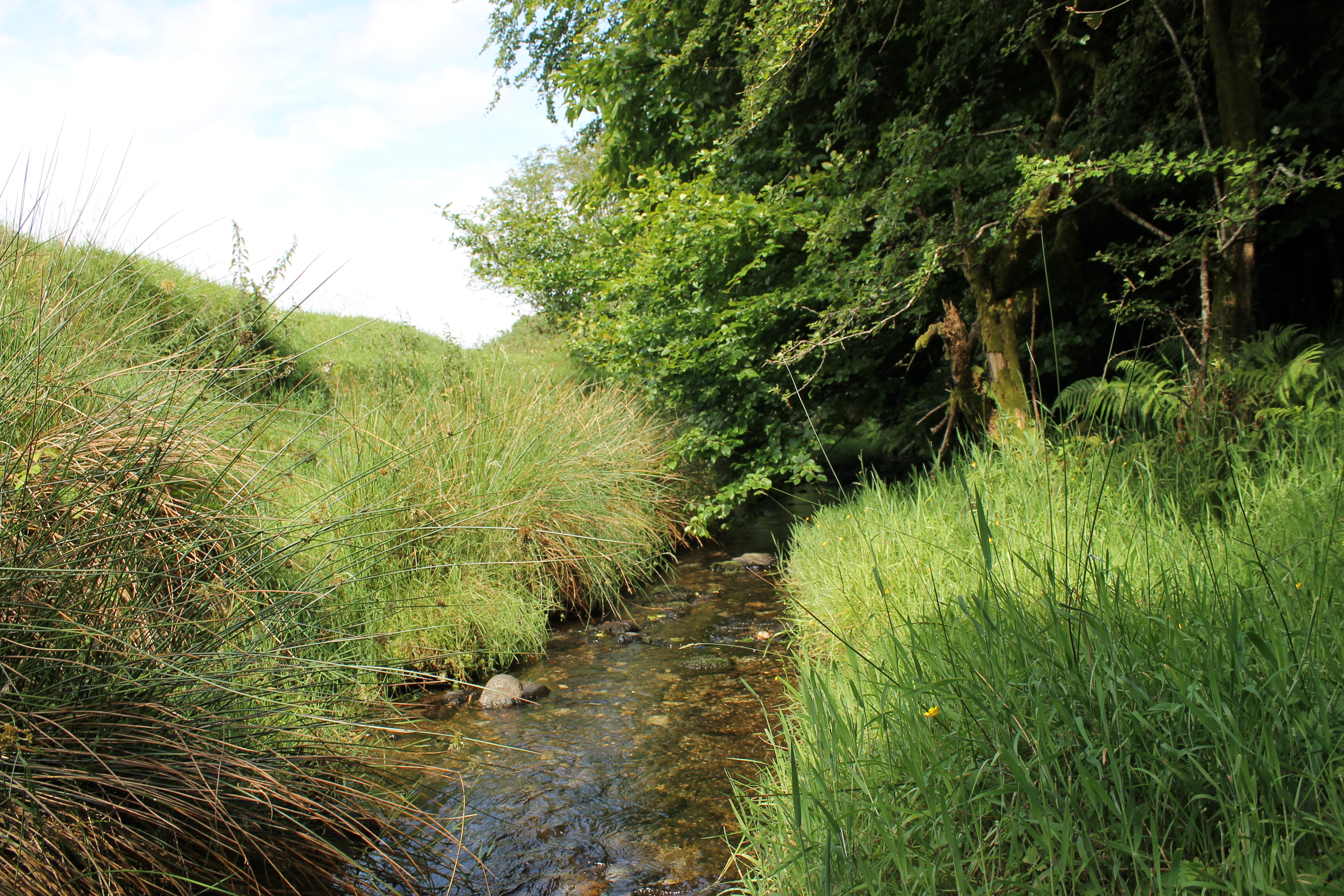
The Goldmines River upstream of Ballinagore Bridge

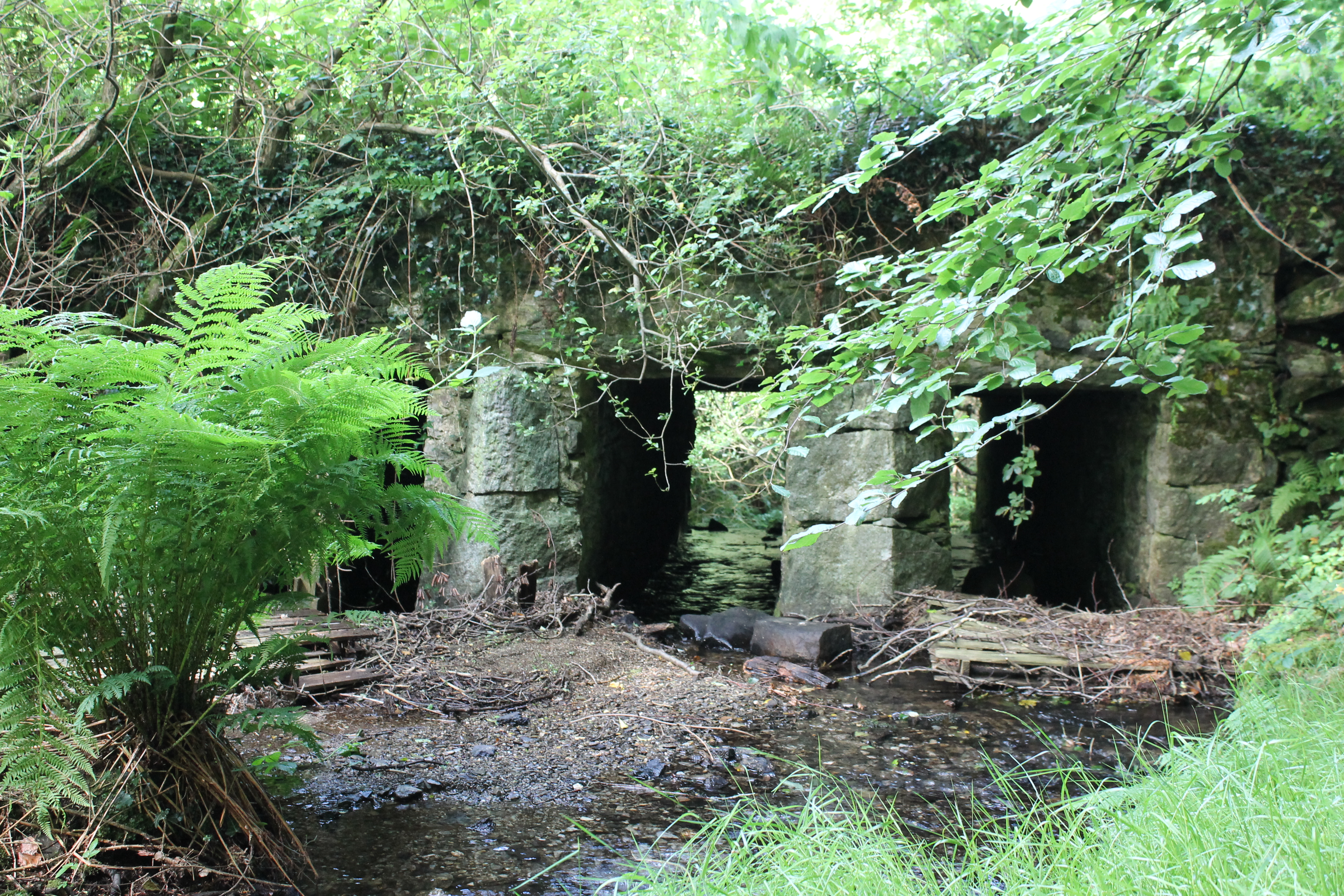
Ballinagore Bridge in 2024

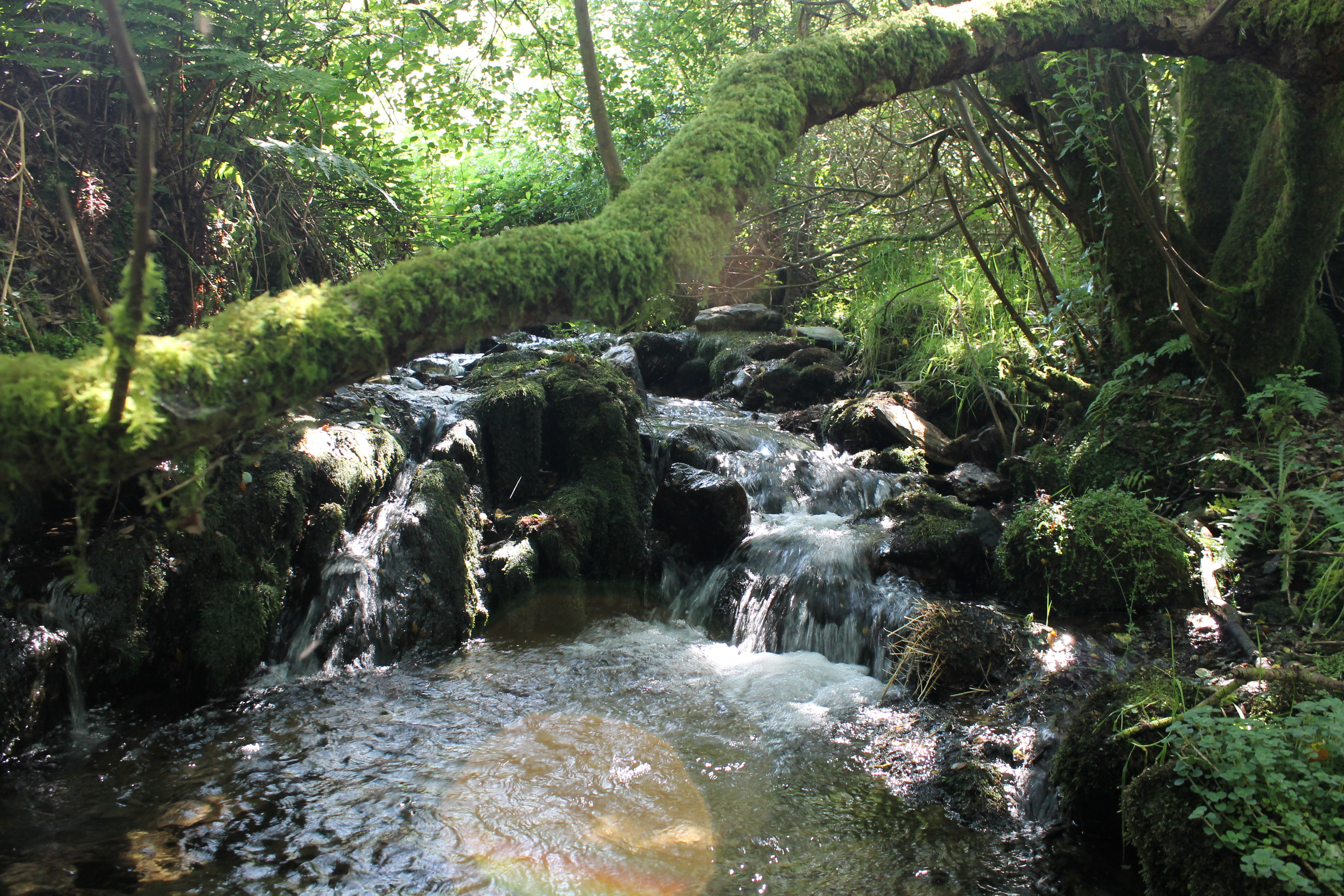
Small plunge pool on the Goldmines River

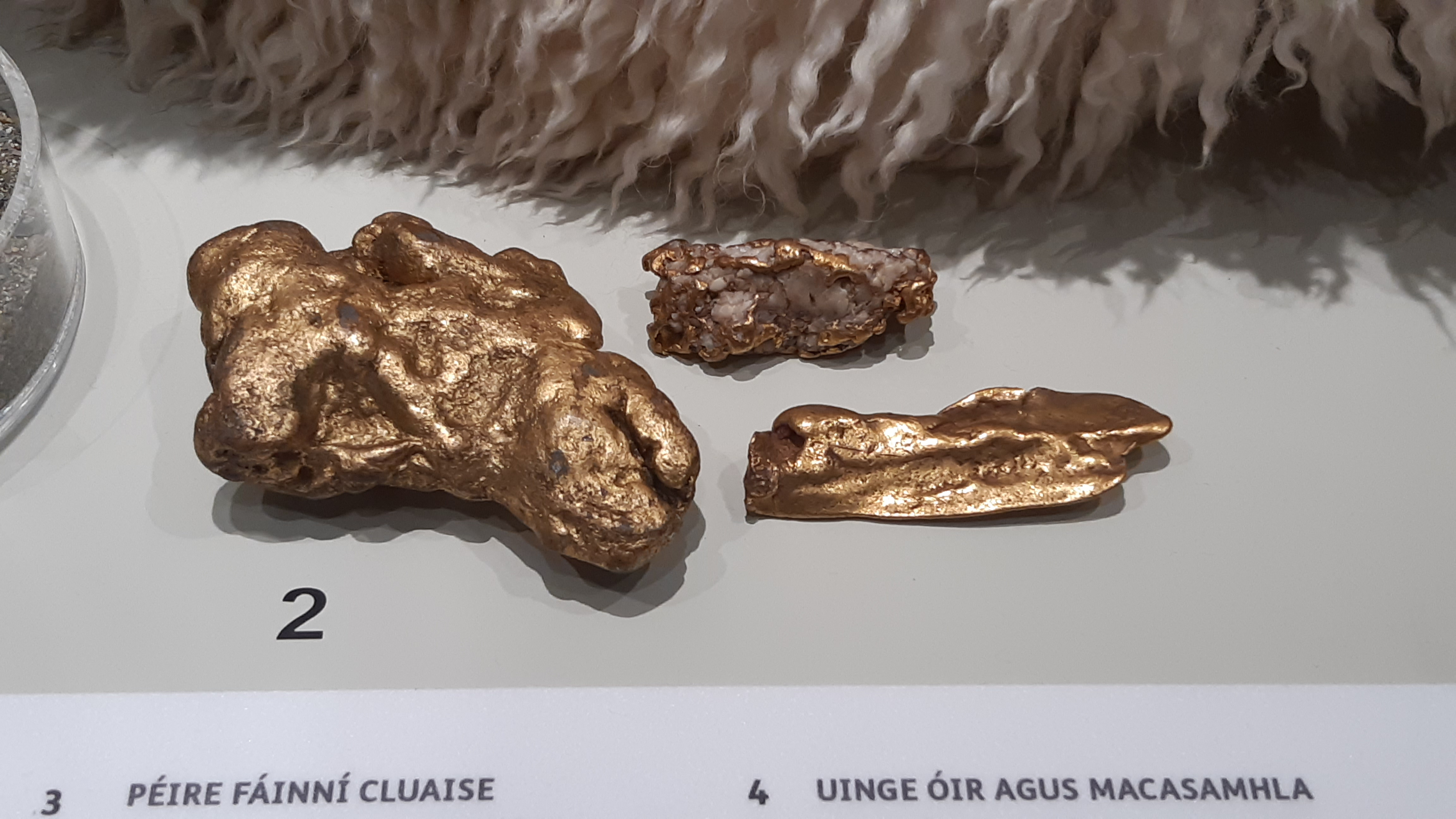
Close-up of Wicklow gold nuggets on display at the National Museum of Ireland – Archaeology, Dublin (Note: the largest nugget is a replica of the 22oz specimen gifted to George III in 1796)

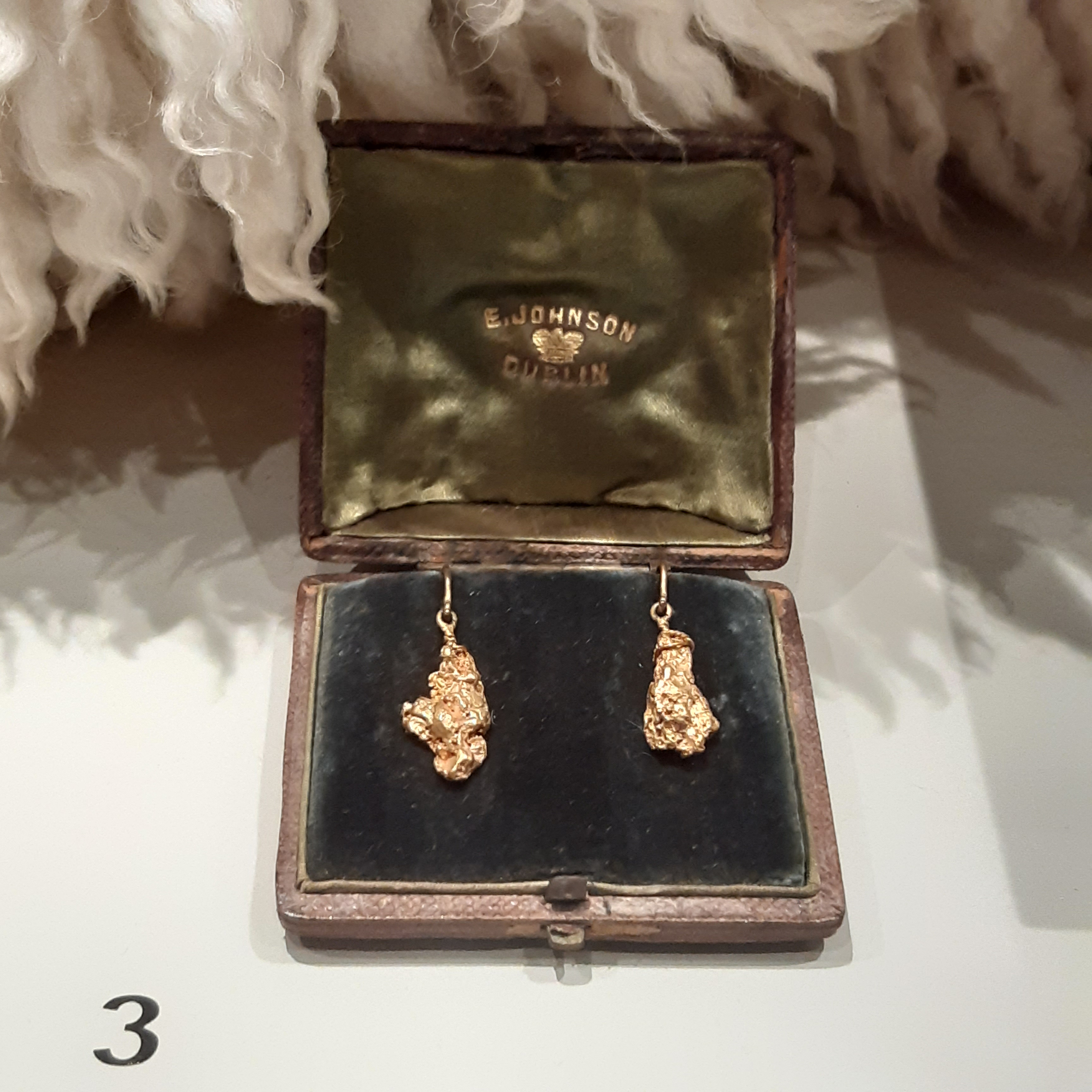
Pair of earrings made from gold nuggets by E. Johnson of Dublin

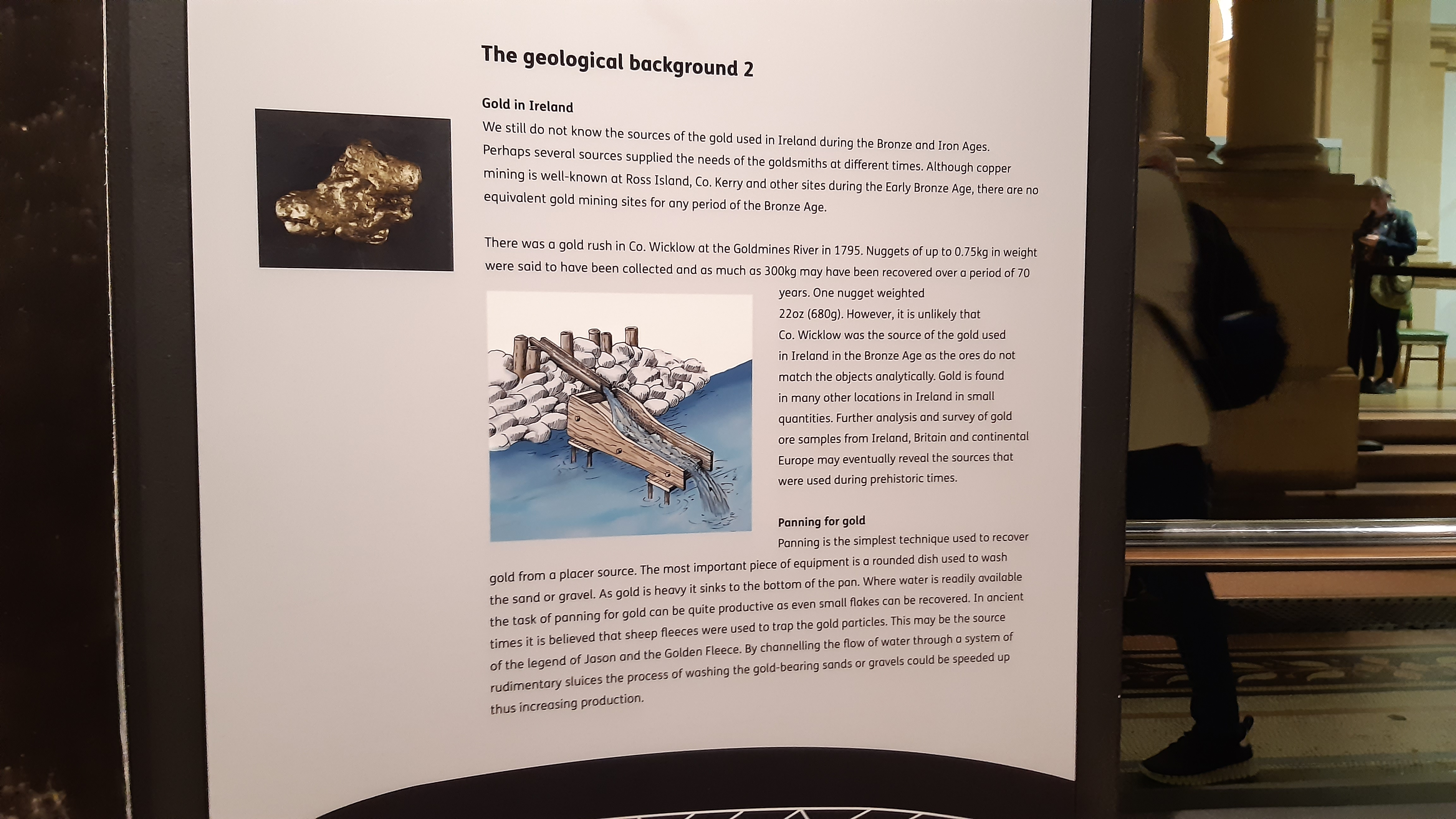
Information about the Wicklow gold rush at the National Museum of Ireland – Archaeology, Dublin

== See also ==
- Charles Stewart Parnell (1846-1891), Irish politician, who was brought up locally and became a strong advocate for mineral development in Ireland
- Irish gold
- List of hoards in Ireland
