= Abraham Mills =

Abraham Mills may refer to:

- Abraham G. Mills (1844–1929), president of the National League of Professional Base Ball Clubs
- Abraham Mills (geologist) (1750–1828), English mining company manager and geologist
