= Jane Elizabeth Moore =

English autobiographical writer (1738–1796?)

- Born: 30 September 1738; London
- Died: 1796?
- Occupations: business person, autobiographer, poet
- Spouse: Thomas Moore
- Writing career
- Language: English
- Years active: 1786-1797
- Period: Romantic
- Notable work: Genuine memoirs of Jane Elizabeth Moore (1786)

Jane Elizabeth Moore (30 September 1738 – 1796?) was an autobiographer and poet, notable for her detailed account of eighteenth-century business practices based on her experiences working as a clerk in her family's firm. Later in life she moved from England to Ireland, where she famously chastised the Freemasons of Dublin.

== Life ==
Moore was born in London to French parents. Her mother died when she was three and she was brought up by a great-grandmother and other relatives. She began work in her father's business in the leather trade in 1753; on October 10, 1761, she married Thomas Moore and subsequently worked in both his and her father's firms. The couple had two children, neither of whom survived infancy. Because of her position with her family's business, she was able to achieve "a measure of financial independence" and negotiated a dowry from her father in recognition of her work. However, her father reneged on the agreement and left her out of his will, resulting in a six-years long lawsuit. Her husband's death after twenty years of marriage left her in further financial difficulties. She moved to Ireland some time before 1795. In 1796 she wrote of her dissatisfaction at being "obligated to any man breathing".

== Writing ==
Moore published her autobiography in 1786. The subtitle is an apparent reference to Laurence Sterne's A Sentimental Journey Through France and Italy. While the work covers a range of personal and cultural material, such as family matters and satiric descriptions of fellow visitors to Bath, the third volume is "a treatise on industry that ranges from improvements in agriculture and inland navigation to changes in coinage and debt law". Her life was not without conflict, and she indicated that she wrote about her difficulties in order to help others.

Her second publication, Miscellaneous poems, on various subjects (1797), was printed privately and published by subscription; the list of subscribers numbers over 300, including Anglo-Irish poet Mary Tighe. As an English-born transplant to Ireland, Moore's poems are often "staunchly loyalist" and include many occasional poems celebrating British royalty, as well as poems of interest to other people of business, such as "On the Discovery of the Gold Mine, in the County of Wicklow" (pp. 88–89) about the Wicklow gold rush:

Replete with hope, shall commerce swell her fail,
And deep the plough in culture fresh prevail;
The tatter'd peasant by such bounty clad,
With joyful toil shall make his children glad! (p. 89, ll. 19-22)

Moore also addresses political issues in her poetry, most famously in her challenge to the Freemasons of Dublin for their exclusion of women with "To the Society of Free and Accepted Masons At Large" (pp. 86–87) and "A Question to the Society of Freemasons" (p. 26):

YE Brethren Masonic of ancient degree,
Who for ages have boasted of being "quite free;"
But whence, my good Sirs, does this freedom arise?
When so many thousands, who wish to be wise,
Are suing instructions you boldly deny;
The answer is tacit, pray tell me for why?
The knowledge you prize were it once but made known,
Might soften the manners and model the clown;
The secret so valu'd, once known to the fair,
Might improve on ideas by feminine air;
Then why were your tenets so cruelly prest,
As not to admit of a plume in your crest?
That an emblem of union would boldly proclaim,
By admitting, "quite freely," each well-inform'd dame,
Who such secret would keep on the terms of admission,
And her sacred word pledge on obtaining permission:
Your answer is claim'd, why you thus should refuse,
The requests of the fair, who were born to amuse.

In her preface she writes that with this range of topics, "I trust I have furnished amusement for the leisure hours of each sex, age, and condition".

== Critical reception ==
A snide review of her autobiography in The English Review suggested she was better suited to business, than to writing. The poetry collection, however, went into a second edition. As a "loyalist Tory" writing in Ireland she had been largely ignored by critics and scholars, though from the late twentieth century onward she has benefited from a general reassessment of Irish women writers.

== Works ==
=== Bibliography ===
- Genuine memoirs of Jane Elizabeth Moore. Late of Bermondsey, in the county of Surry. Written by herself: containing the singular adventures of herself and family. Her Sentimental Journey through Great Britain: specifying the various Manufactures carried on at each Town. A comprehensive Treatise on the Trade, Manufactures, Navigation, Laws and Police of this Kingdom, and the necessity of a Country Hospital. 3 volumes. London: John Bew; William Richardson; G. Golding, 1786.
- Miscellaneous poems, on various subjects, by Jane Elizabeth Moore. Dublin: sold by subscription, 1796 (2nd ed. 1797).

=== Extexts ===
- Anthologized in Barros and Smith (pp. 229–238); Carpenter (pp. 530–534).

== Notes and references ==
=== References ===
- Barros, Carolyn A., and Smith, Johanna M, eds. Life-writings by British women, 1660-1850: an anthology. Boston : Northeastern University Press, 2000. (Etext, Internet Archive)
- Behrendt, Stephen C. British Women Poets And The Romantic Writing Community. Baltimore: The Johns Hopkins University Press, 2009. ISBN 978-0-8018-9054-3, ISBN 0-8018-9054-3 (Etext, Internet Archive)
- Carpenter, Andrew, ed. Verse in English from eighteenth-century Ireland. Cork, Ireland: Cork University Press, 1998. (Etext, Internet Archive)
- Stauffer, Donald A. The art of biography in eighteenth century England. Princeton: Princeton University Press, 1941. (Etext, Internet Archive)
- Todd, Janet M. A Dictionary of British and American women writers, 1660-1800. Totowa, N.J.: Rowman & Allanheld, 1985. (Etext, Internet Archive)
- "Moore, Jane Elizabeth." The Women's Print History Project, 2019, Person ID 1476. Accessed 2023-09-18.
