= Thomas Weaver (geologist) =

English mining engineer and geologist

Thomas Weaver (1773–2 July 1855) was an English mining engineer and geologist who spent much of his career in Ireland.

== Life ==
He studied geology and mineralogy from 1790 to 1794 under Abraham Werner at Freiberg. Soon after his return to England he was entrusted by government with the investigation of the gold deposits in County Wicklow, Ireland that had sparked the Wicklow gold rush of 1795. in the early days of the Geological Society he became one of its active members. In 1826 he was elected a Fellow of the Royal Society.

Weaver subsequently travelled as a mining geologist in Mexico and the United States. He had retired for some years before his death, which took place at his home in Pimlico, 2 July 1855.

== Works ==
Weaver published in the second series of the Transactions of the Geological Society (vols. i. and iv.) on the geology of Gloucestershire, Somerset, and the south of Ireland. He published in 1819 Memoir on the Geological Relations of the East of Ireland (London). In the Philosophical Transactions of the Royal Society for 1825 he asserted the relatively modern age of the fossil remains of the Irish Elk (Megaloceros giganteus). In 1831 he began a series of papers on the carboniferous rocks of America. In the Royal Society's catalogue (vi. 285–6) he is credited with twenty geological papers, dated between 1820 and 1841, eight referring to Ireland. They were mainly in Thomas Thomson's Annals of Philosophy, the Philosophical Magazine, the Annals of Natural History, and the Transactions and Proceedings of the Geological Society.’
