= Abraham Mills (geologist) =

English mine manager (1750–1828)

Abraham Mills (Circa 1750 – 2 March 1828) was an English mining company manager and geologist.

== Life ==
Early in life he was near Exeter in Devon. In 1783 he was leasing property at Gerston near West Alvington in the same area; his brother Henry Mills was a timber merchant at Rotherhithe. William Roe, looking to replace his father Charles Roe with a business manager, recruited Mills to the Macclesfield works of Roe & Co., an English copper smelting company.

Roe & Co. lost its Anglesey copper mining lease in 1785, when Lord Uxbridge refused the renewal on the Mona Mine. In search of fresh supplies, it purchased disused Irish copper mines in County Wicklow. From 1787 Mills was working the Cronebane copper mines of Wicklow, with Thomas Weaver (the elder). The Associated Irish Mining Company then operated there to 1816. When gold was discovered in the locality in 1795, Mills and Weaver reported to the government; and Mills and John Lloyd wrote scientific papers about it. During the Irish Rebellion of 1798 Mills acted as a militia commander, with the rank of captain in the Cronebane Infantry. In November 1798 the mines were transferred to a partnership of Mills and Thomas Weaver (the younger).

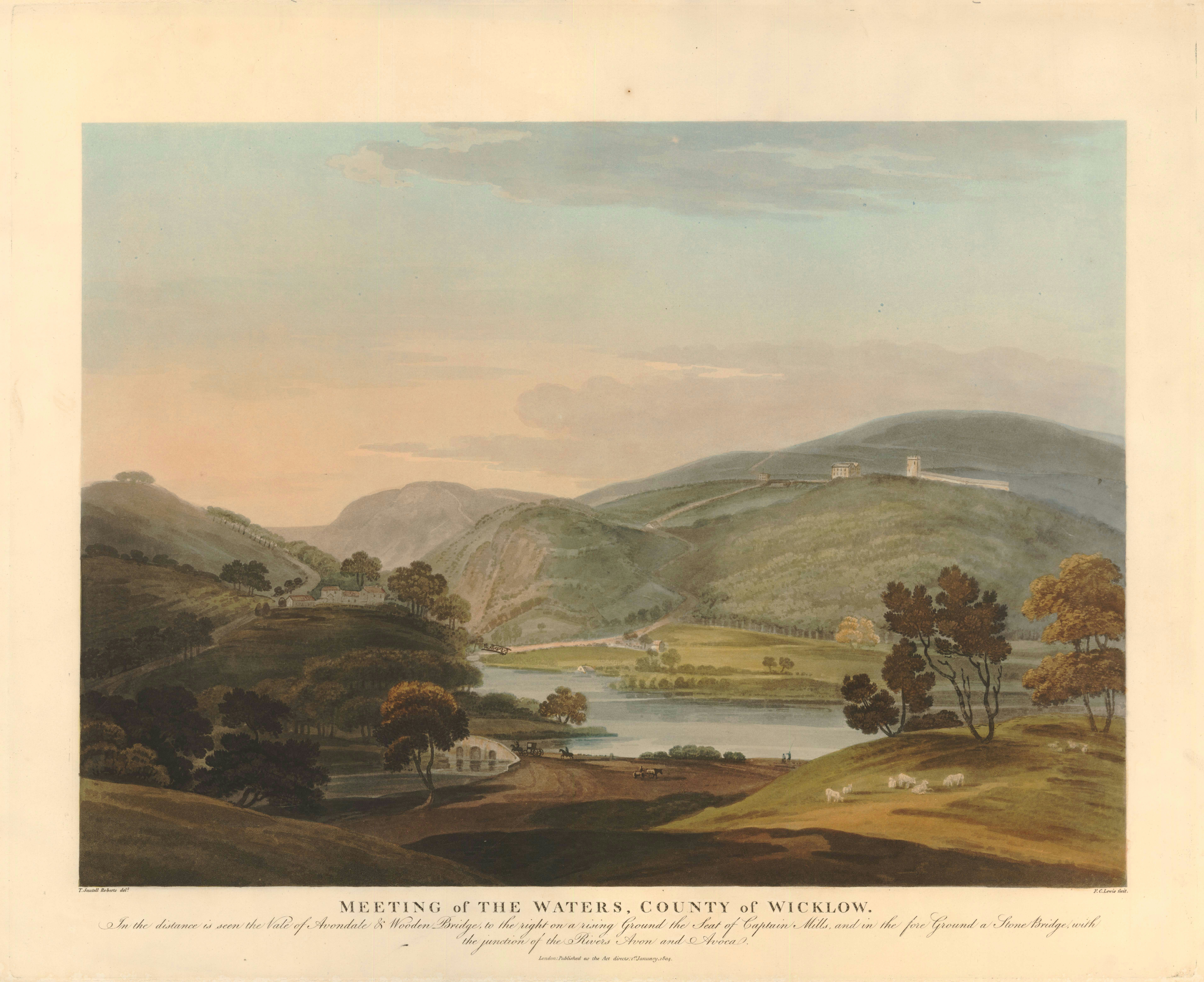
Landscape (1804) in County Wicklow, Ireland, by Frederick Christian Lewis after Thomas Sautelle Roberts, showing Abraham Mills's residence to the left

Mills played a major part in the relocation of Roe and Co.'s smelter from Toxteth on Merseyside to a site on the River Neath in South Wales. He went to the proposed site on the way to Cornwall, and set up transitional arrangements. Land was on a lease from George Rice, 3rd Baron Dynevor (landlord from 1793) to Richard Parsons, who sublet to Mills and Edward Hawkins.

In 1799 Mills gave evidence to a House of Commons inquiry into the copper trade. In 1799, also, the bank Hawkins & Mills closed. It had been the first bank in Macclesfield when it had opened in 1787, set up by Mills and Edward Hawkins. Mills from the start had not been an active partner.

Mills was a Fellow of the Royal Society, and was on the Chemistry and Mineralogy Committee of the Dublin Society. From 1810 he was expressing pessimism about the future of Roe & Co.; and the company was dismantled from about 1817. He had a position in the Ordnance Department at Dublin. He died at Bodlendeb, Caernarvonshire, on 2 March 1828, aged 78. He had one child, Mary Anne, who married Thomas Legh of Macclesfield on 20 August 1792. His library was sold at auction by Stewart, Wheatley & Adlard on 4 August 1828 (and seven following days), along with a miscellaneous collection of books and pictures; a copy of the catalogue is held at Cambridge University Library (shelfmark Munby.c.152(12)).

== Geological works ==
In 1789 Mills wrote to Richard Kirwan, offering corrections to a paper of Kirwan on English collieries. In it he cited the example of the Blakelow pit, on Macclesfield. Kirwan with good grace had Mills's letter read to the Royal Irish Academy. A visit to Islay, where Roe & Co. had a mine that had just closed, led to a paper in the 1790 New Annual Register, Observations on the Whyn Dykes of Ilay. In it Mills proposed the volcanic origin for the quartz-dolerite formations known locally as "whin dykes". John Lloyd challenged him on the point, and he published On the Strata and Volcanic Appearances in the North of Ireland and Western Islands of Scotland (1790); in the geological debate of the time, this paper made Mills a supporter of the igneous theory. James Hutton took account of it, in his Theory of the Earth.

Mills also wrote:

- A mineralogical account of the native gold lately discovered in Ireland (1796)

== Death Announcement ==
Evening Mail 12 March 1828 – Deaths: On Sunday, 2nd instant, at Bodlendeb, near Conway, Caernarvonshire, in the 79th year of his age, deeply & universally lamented by his relatives & friends, Abraham Mills Esq., F.R.S., late one of the officers in His Majesty's Ordnance department. Dublin.

Abraham Mills was buried on 8 March 1828 at Conway, Caernarvonshire, Wales. (Source Welsh Archive Services).

== See also ==
- Avoca, County Wicklow#Mining
