= Benbrack =

Mountain in County Galway, Ireland

- Binn Bhreac
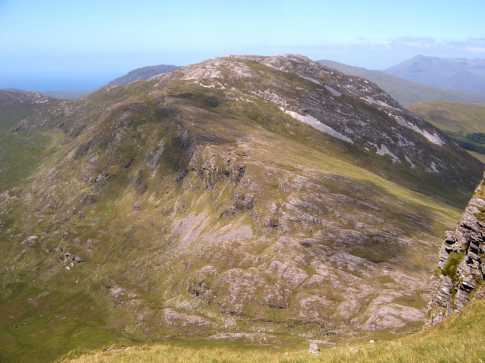
- South face of Benbrack viewed from Muckanaght, with col of Maumnascalpa at right

Highest point
- Elevation: 582 m (1,909 ft)
- Prominence: 264 m (866 ft)
- Listing: Marilyn, Arderin
- Coordinates: 53.537986°N 9.862684°W

Naming
- English translation: speckled peak
- Language of name: Irish

Geography
- Location within Ireland
- Location: County Galway, Ireland
- Parent range: Twelve Bens
- OSI/OSNI grid: L7655855818
- Topo map: OSi Discovery 37

Geology
- Rock type(s): Pale quartzites, grits, graphitic top bedrock

Benbrack (Irish: Binn Bhreac, meaning 'Speckled Peak') at 582 metres (1,909 ft), is the 251st–highest peak in Ireland on the Arderin scale; while it does not have the elevation to be a Vandeleur-Lynam, it has the prominence to rank as a Marilyn. Benbrack is situated on its own small massif to the north of the core Twelve Bens mountain range in the Connemara National Park in County Galway, Ireland. It is the 10th-tallest of the core Twelve Bens, and is linked by a deep col to Muckanaght, which is itself attached by a high ridge to the tallest mountain of the Twelve Bens range, Benbaun at 729 metres (2,392 ft).

== Naming ==
The name is most likely derived from the lumps of quartzite stones and boulders that are strewn across the summit of Benbrack.

== Geography ==
Benbrack sits on its own small massif, with Benbaun and the large massif of the core Twelve Bens lying to the south, connected via a deep col called Maumnascalpa to the Bens of Muckanaght 654 metres (2,146 ft) and Benfree 638 metres (2,093 ft); to the north is Kylemore Lough (and Kylemore Abbey), and across the Lough is the massif of Garraun, which is part of the wider Twelve Bens/Garraun Complex Special Area of Conservation.

To the west of Benbrack, at the end of a long spur, is the subsidiary, and similarly named summit of Knockbrack at 442 metres (1,450 ft) (Irish: Cnoc Breac, meaning "speckled hill"). To the north of Benbrack, is the other subsidiary summit of Benbaun, at 447 metres (1,467 ft), which can confused with the larger 729-metre Benbaun to the south, and therefore its other Irish language place name Irish: Maolán (meaning "knoll"), can be used instead.

Benbrack lies at the intersection of two major U-shaped valleys, with Glencorbet to the east, and Polladirk to the west (Polladirk can be viewed from a popular scenic viewpoint on the summit of Diamond Hill). To the northwest of Benbrack, is the small valley and river of Mweelin Irish: Mweelin, around which Knockbrack, Benbrack and Benbaun (477 m) form a small horseshoe, popular with walkers.

== Hill walking ==
The most straightforward route to climb Benbrack is a 5-kilometre 2.5-hour round-trip via its subsidiary peak of Benbaun, starting and ending at the car park in Kylemore Abbey (L747583); this route can be expanded into the 7-kilometre 3.5 hour Mweelin Horseshoe, by descending via Knockbrack.

Benbrack is also climbed as part of the Glencorbet Horseshoe, a 14-kilometre 6–7 hour circuit of Kylemore River, usually done counter-clockwise, which takes in the peaks of Benbaun (477 metres), Benbrack, Muckanaght (optional), Benfree, Benbaun (729 metres), and ending at Knockpasheemore.

== Gallery ==
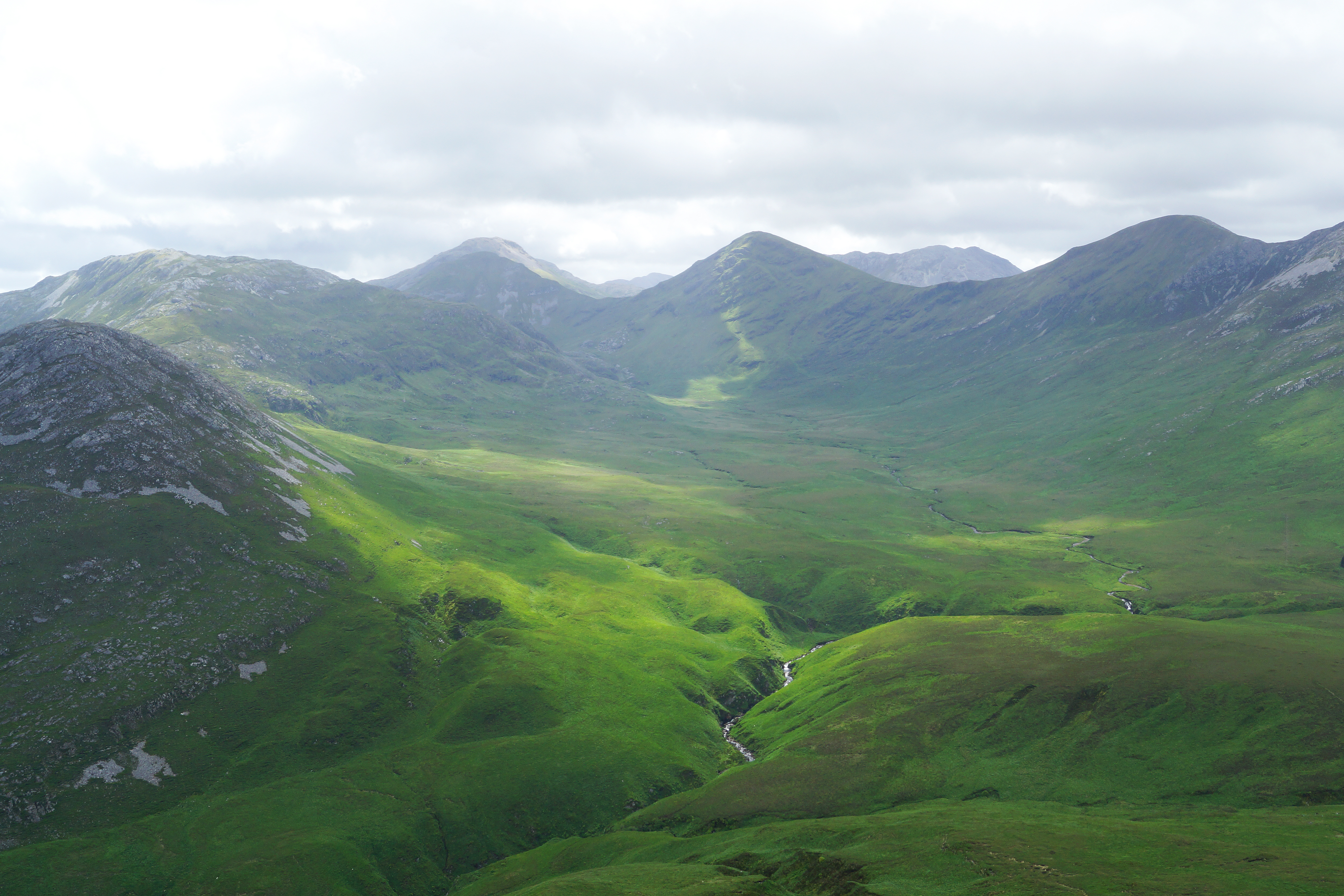
Polladirk Valley with Benbrack and Knockbrack to the left, as viewed from Diamond Hill

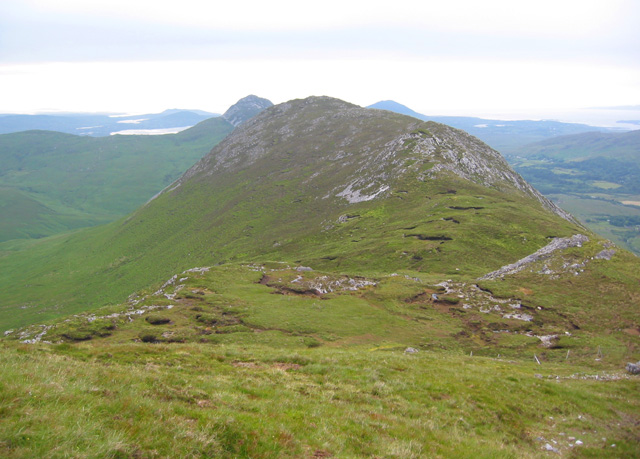
Summit of Knockbrack as viewed from the col with Benbrack

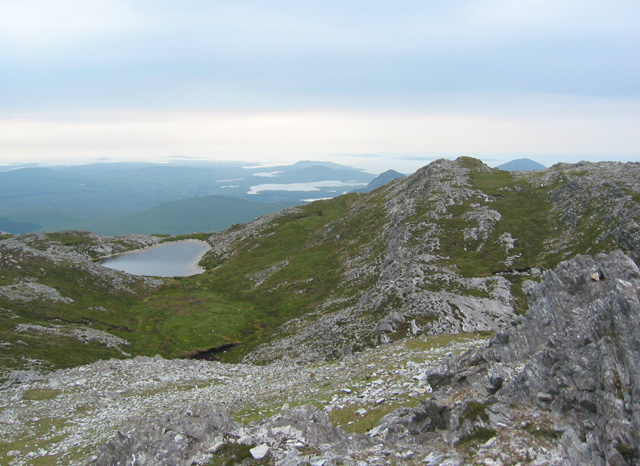
View northwest to Killary Harbour, from the summit of Benbrack

== Bibliography ==
- Fairbairn, Helen (2014). Ireland's Best Walks: A Walking Guide. Collins Press. ISBN 978-1848892118.
- MountainViews Online Database (Simon Stewart) (2013). A Guide to Ireland's Mountain Summits: The Vandeleur-Lynams & the Arderins. Collins Books. ISBN 978-1-84889-164-7.
- Paul Phelan (2011). Connemara & Mayo - A Walking Guide: Mountain, Coastal & Island Walks. Collins Press. ISBN 978-1848891029.
- Dillion, Paddy (2001). Connemara: Collins Rambler's guide. Harper Collins. ISBN 978-0002201216.
- Dillion, Paddy (1993). The Mountains of Ireland: A Guide to Walking the Summits. Cicerone. ISBN 978-1852841102.

== See also ==
- Twelve Bens
- Mweelrea, major range in Killary Harbour
- Maumturks, major range in Connemara
- Lists of mountains in Ireland
- List of Marilyns in the British Isles
