= Diamond Hill (Ireland) =

Mountain in Galway, Ireland

- Binn Ghuaire
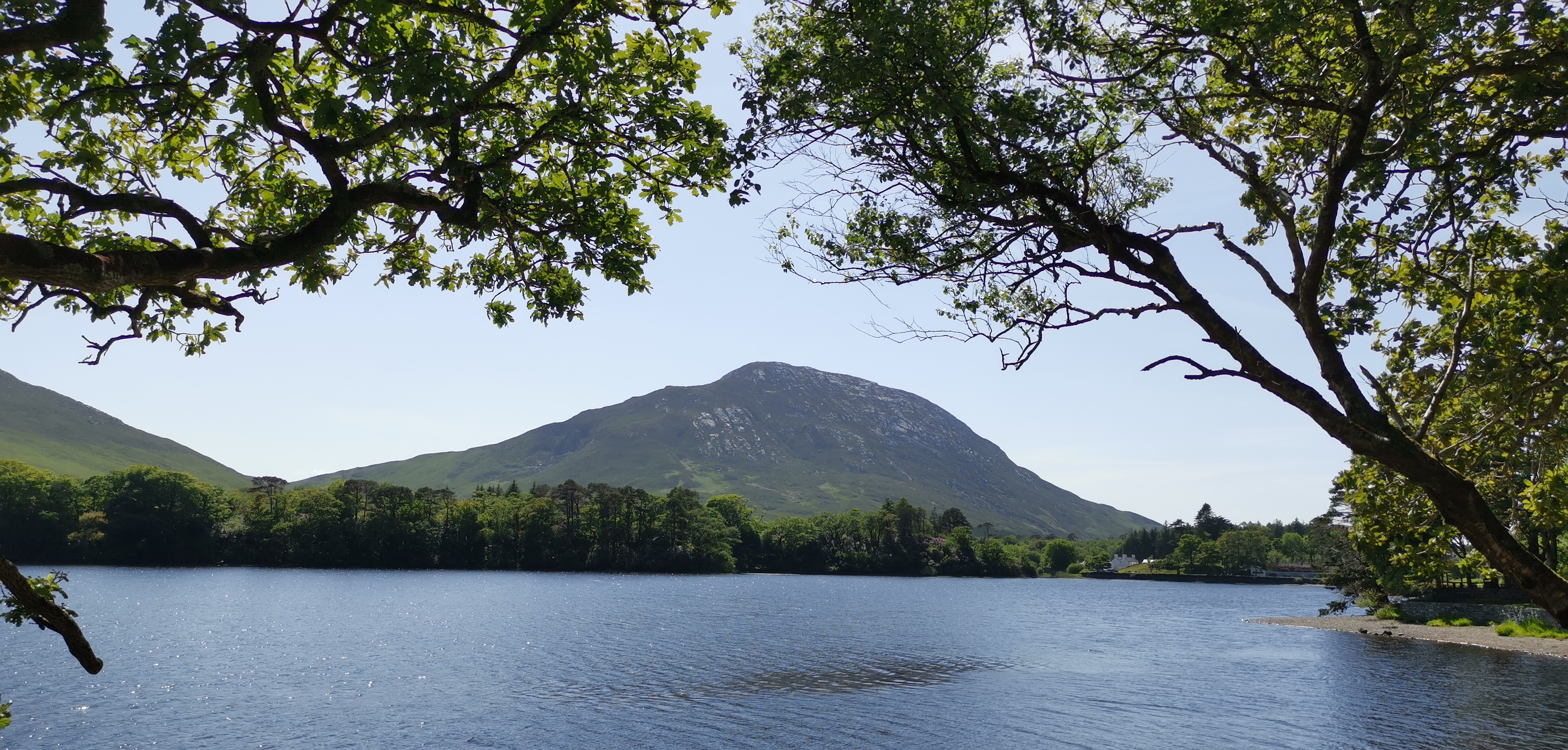
- Diamond Hill, viewed from near Kylemore Abbey to the north

Highest point
- Elevation: 442 m (1,450 ft)
- Prominence: 277 m (909 ft)
- Isolation: 2.73 km (1.70 mi)
- Listing: Marilyn
- Coordinates: 53°32′53.93″N 9°54′52.20″W

Naming
- English translation: Guaire's peak
- Language of name: Irish

Geography
- Location within Ireland
- Location: Letterfrack, County Galway, Ireland
- Parent range: Twelve Bens
- OSI/OSNI grid: L7313857049
- Topo map: OSi Discovery 37

Geology
- Rock type(s): Pale quartzites, grits, graphitic top bedrock

Climbing
- Easiest route: National Park Visitor Centre

Diamond Hill or Bengooria (Irish: Binn Ghuaire, meaning 'Guaire's peak') is an isolated peak overlooking the village of Letterfrack, in the northwest corner of the Twelve Bens in Connemara National Park in County Galway, Ireland. At only 442 metres (1,450 ft), it does not rank as an Arderin, or a Vandeleur-Lynam; however, it has the prominence to rank as a Marilyn.

Diamond Hill lies just west of Knockbrack and the small massif of Benbrack, and looks into the Polladirk valley, around which several major Bens are located. Despite its moderate size and isolation, compared to the nearby Twelve Bens, Diamond Hill is a popular peak due to its paths and boarded mountain trail, and relative ease of access, together with views of the core Twelve Bens range, and western Connemara.

== Naming ==
According to Irish academic Paul Tempan, "Ghuaire" most likely refers to Guaire Aidne mac Colmáin (died 663), one of the Kings of Connacht and a member of the Ui Fiachrach Aidhne. Guaire was renowned for his hospitality and generosity and was known as "Guaire of the extended hand", and is the title character in W. B. Yeats’ play, The King’s Threshold. He is also associated with Dunguaire Castle, near the village of Kinvara.

Tempan also notes that Diamond Hill is also known as "Bengooria", being an anglicised version of its Irish name, as well as "Benhoowirra", an alternative anglicisation. The Discovery Map spells the name as "Diomond Hill", however, Tempan notes that this is not the locally accepted spelling (being "Diamond"), and relates to the glitter of the quartz crystals on the mountain.

== Geography ==
Diamond Hill is an isolated peak of the Twelve Bens, which lies in the north-west corner of the range. Immediately east of Diamond Hill is the minor peak of Knockbrack at 442 metres (1,450 ft), which is part of the small massif of Benbrack 582 metres (1,909 ft), one of the core Twelve Bens.

To the north of Diamond Hill is Kylemore Lough (and Kylemore Abbey), and across the Lough is the massif of Garraun, which is part of the wider Twelve Bens/Garraun Complex Special Area of Conservation. To the west of Diamond Hill is the Ballinakill harbour (and weather permitting, views to the isles of Inishboffin and Inishark), and to the south are the western boglands and dotted lakes of Connemara.

To the southeast is the scenic valley of Polladirk, around which several major Bens are located, including Benbrack, Benfree 638 metres (2,093 ft) (and Benbaun at 729 metres (2,392 ft), the tallest Ben in the range just behind Benfree), Muckanaght 654 metres (2,146 ft), and Bencullagh 632 metres (2,073 ft).

== Hill walking ==
Diamond Hill is popular for its accessibility and panoramic views, only ranking behind Croagh Patrick for footfall, and attracts both Irish walkers and foreign tourists. The mountain was closed to climbing in 2002 due to severe erosion but was re-opened in December 2005 after the completion of a Euro 1.4 million wooden boardwalk and stone path trail that would limit further erosion.

The most popular route is the 7-kilometre 2.5-hour round-trip trail that starts and ends at the National Park visitor centre in Letterfrack, and does a loop over the summit ridge and back to the main trail; it does not require any special hiking ability and the trail is well marked, with pathways and boardwalks over bog sections. The trail splits into a Lower Diamond Hill Walk (3 km long loop), and an Upper Diamond Hill Walk (3.7 km long loop) which reaches the summit.

== Gallery ==
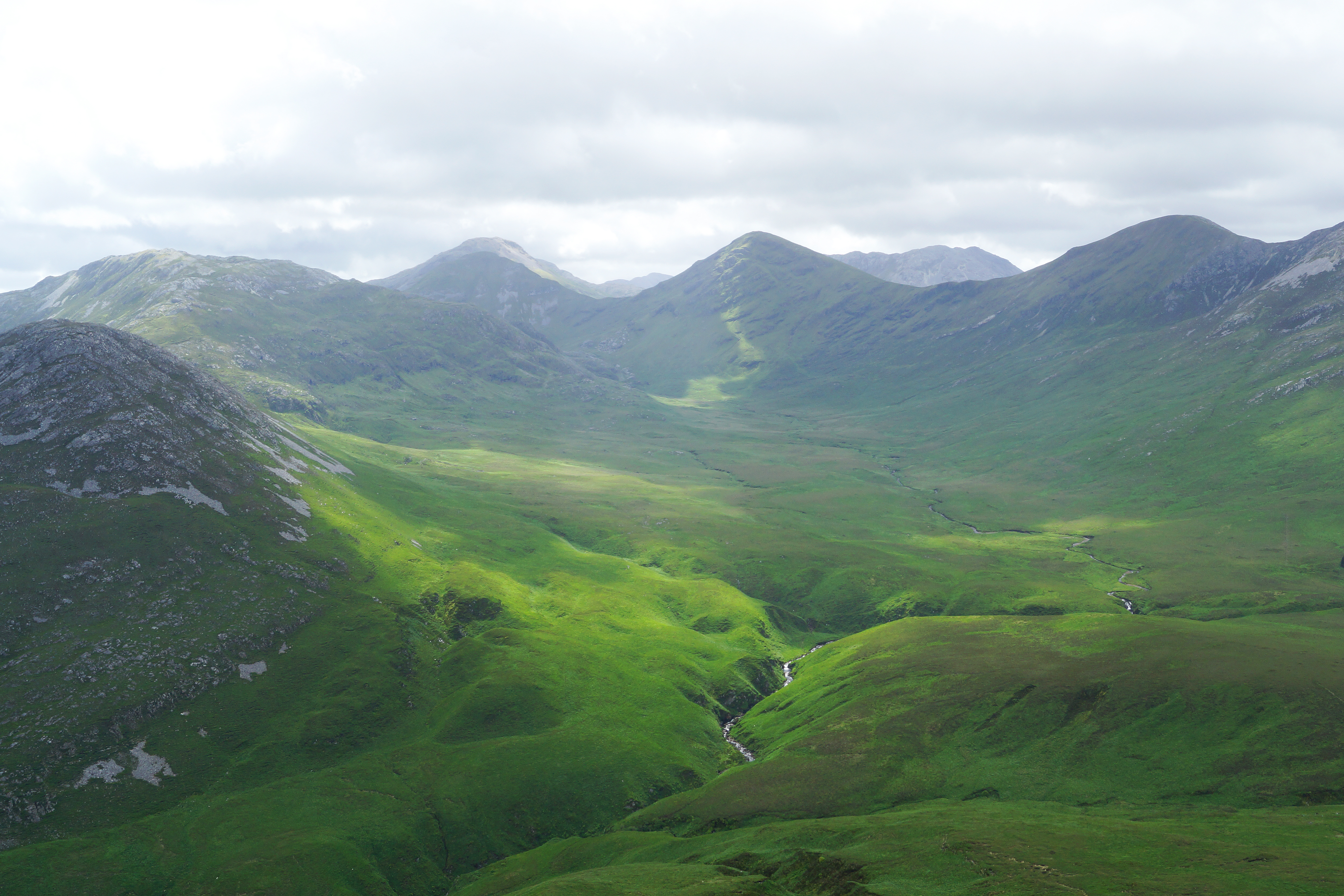
Polladirk Valley: Benbrack and Knockbrack to the left, Benfree (and Benbaun right behind it) (centre left), and Muckanaght (centre right) and Bencullagh (right)

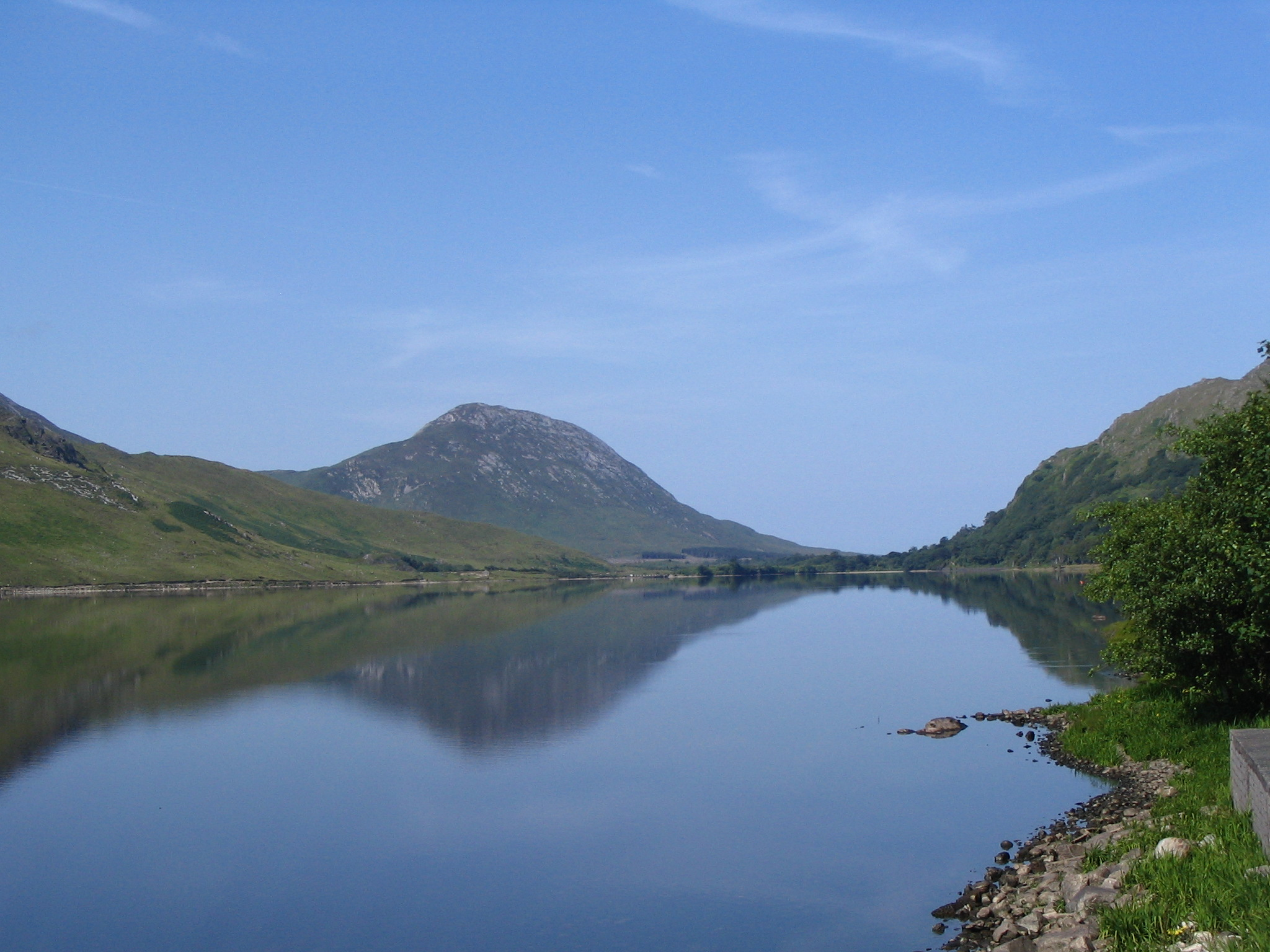
Diamond Hill, viewed from Kylemore Lough in the northeast.

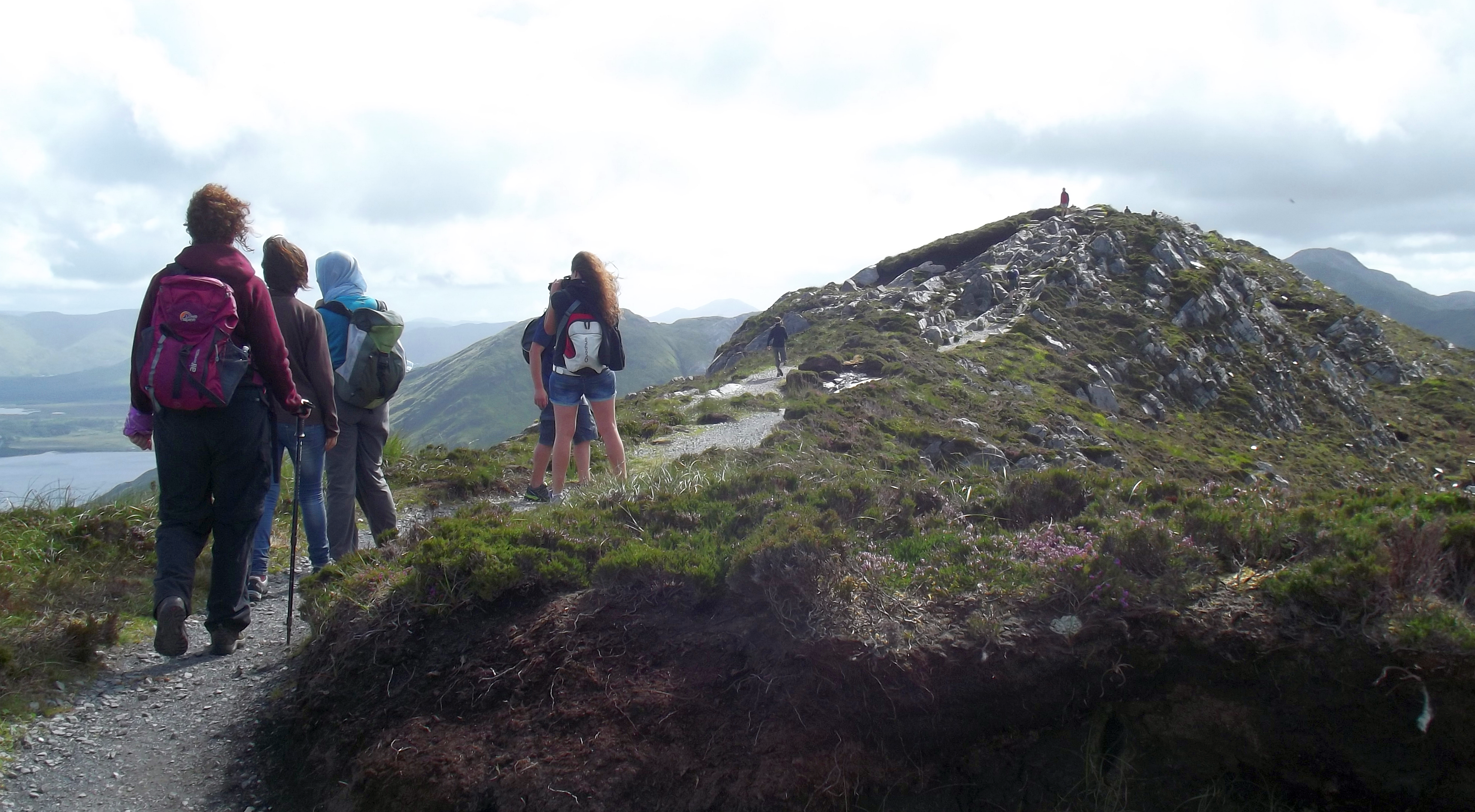
Trail (stone path section) along the final summit ridge of Diamond Hill

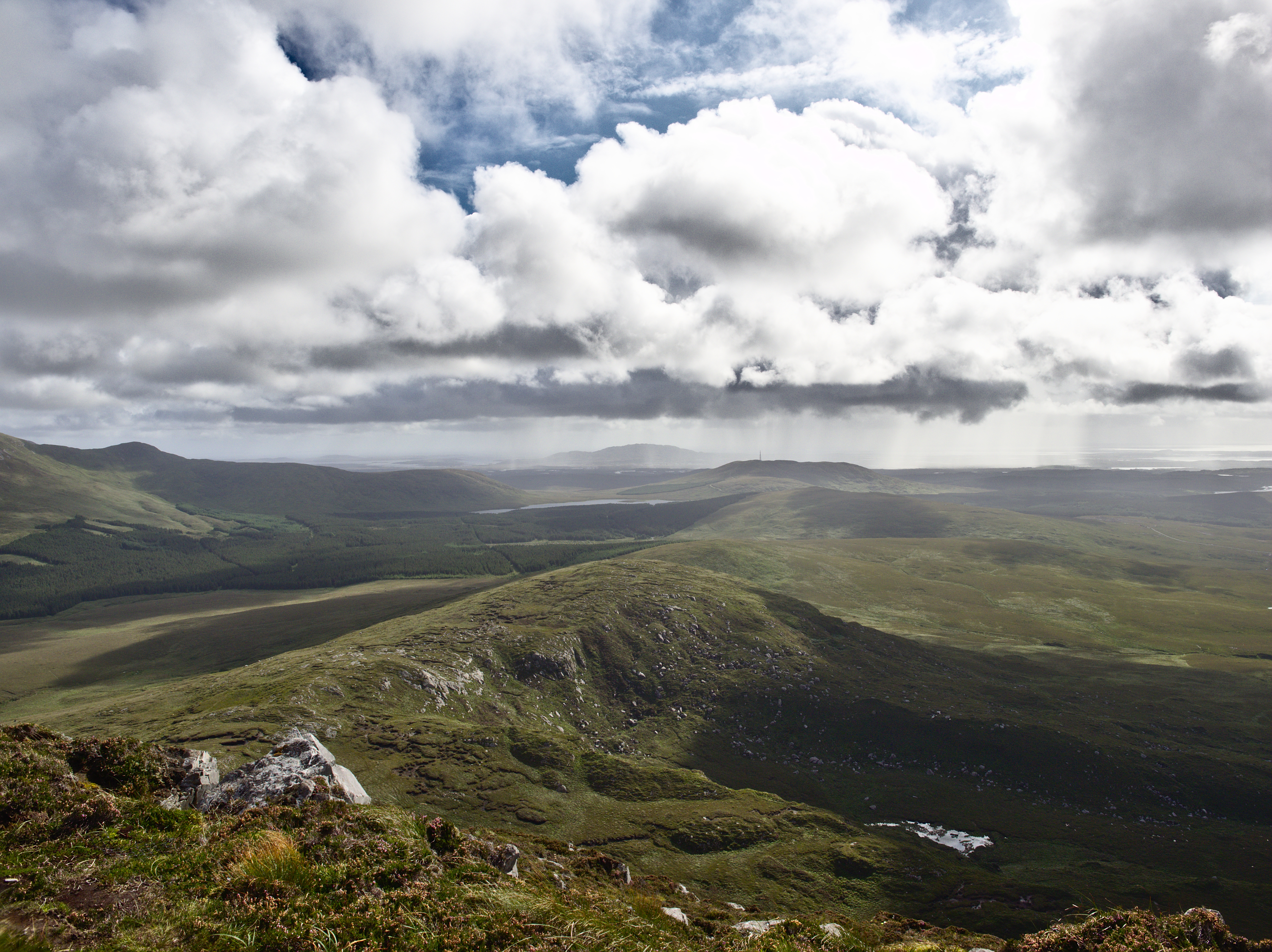
View south from the summit to the boglands of Connemara

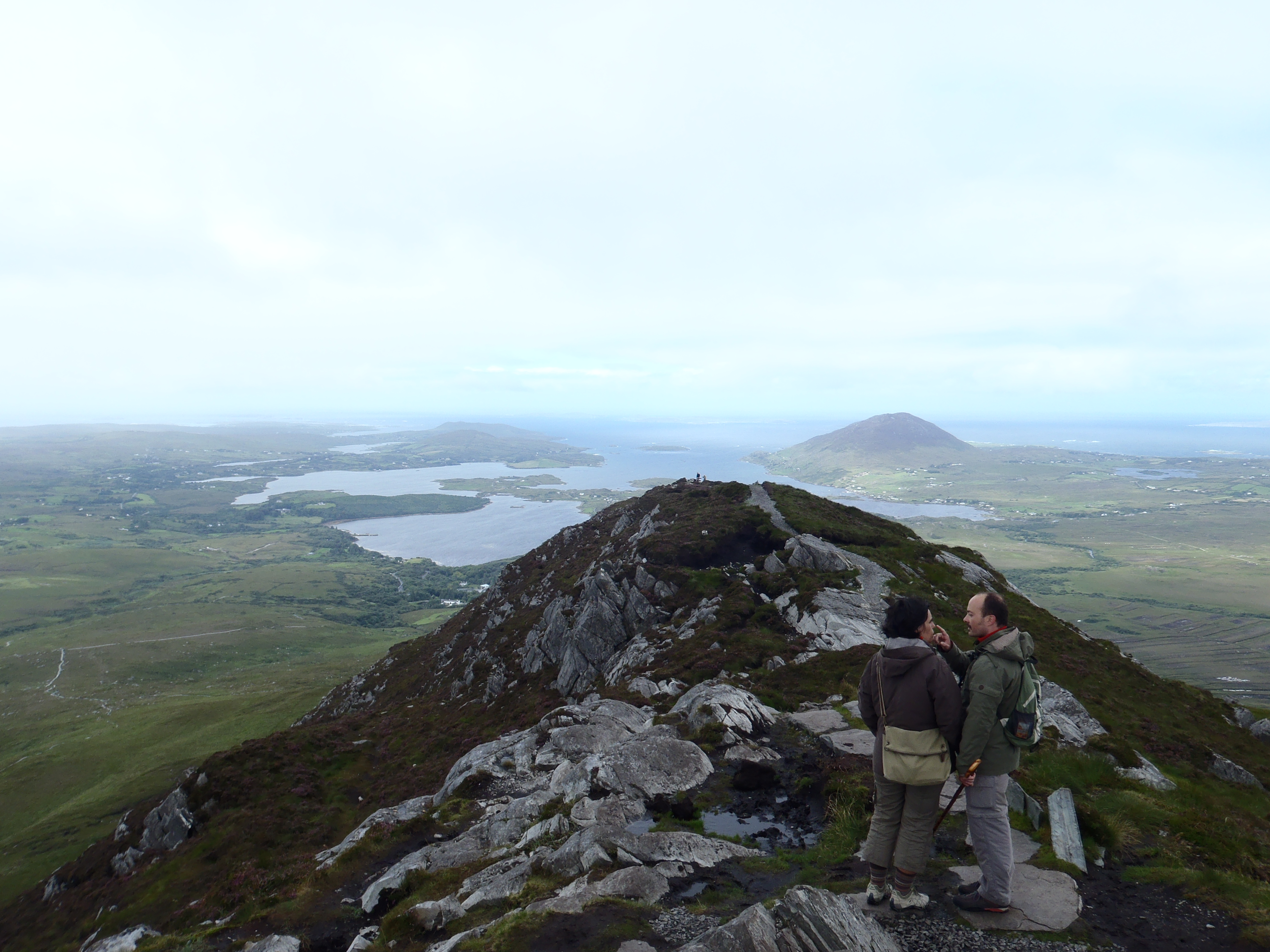
Summit of Diamond Hill and view west, with Tully Mountain (right)

== Bibliography ==
- Fairbairn, Helen (2014). Ireland's Best Walks: A Walking Guide. Collins Press. ISBN 978-1848892118.
- MountainViews Online Database (Simon Stewart) (2013). A Guide to Ireland's Mountain Summits: The Vandeleur-Lynams & the Arderins. Collins Books. ISBN 978-1-84889-164-7.
- Paul Phelan (2011). Connemara & Mayo - A Walking Guide: Mountain, Coastal & Island Walks. Collins Press. ISBN 978-1848891029.
- Dillion, Paddy (2001). Connemara: Collins Rambler's guide. Harper Collins. ISBN 978-0002201216.
- Dillion, Paddy (1993). The Mountains of Ireland: A Guide to Walking the Summits. Cicerone. ISBN 978-1852841102.

== See also ==
- Twelve Bens
- Mweelrea, major range in Killary Harbour
- Maumturks, major range in Connemara
- Lists of mountains in Ireland
- List of Marilyns in the British Isles
