= Twelve Bens =

Mountain range in Connemara, Ireland

Twelve Bens/Benna Beola
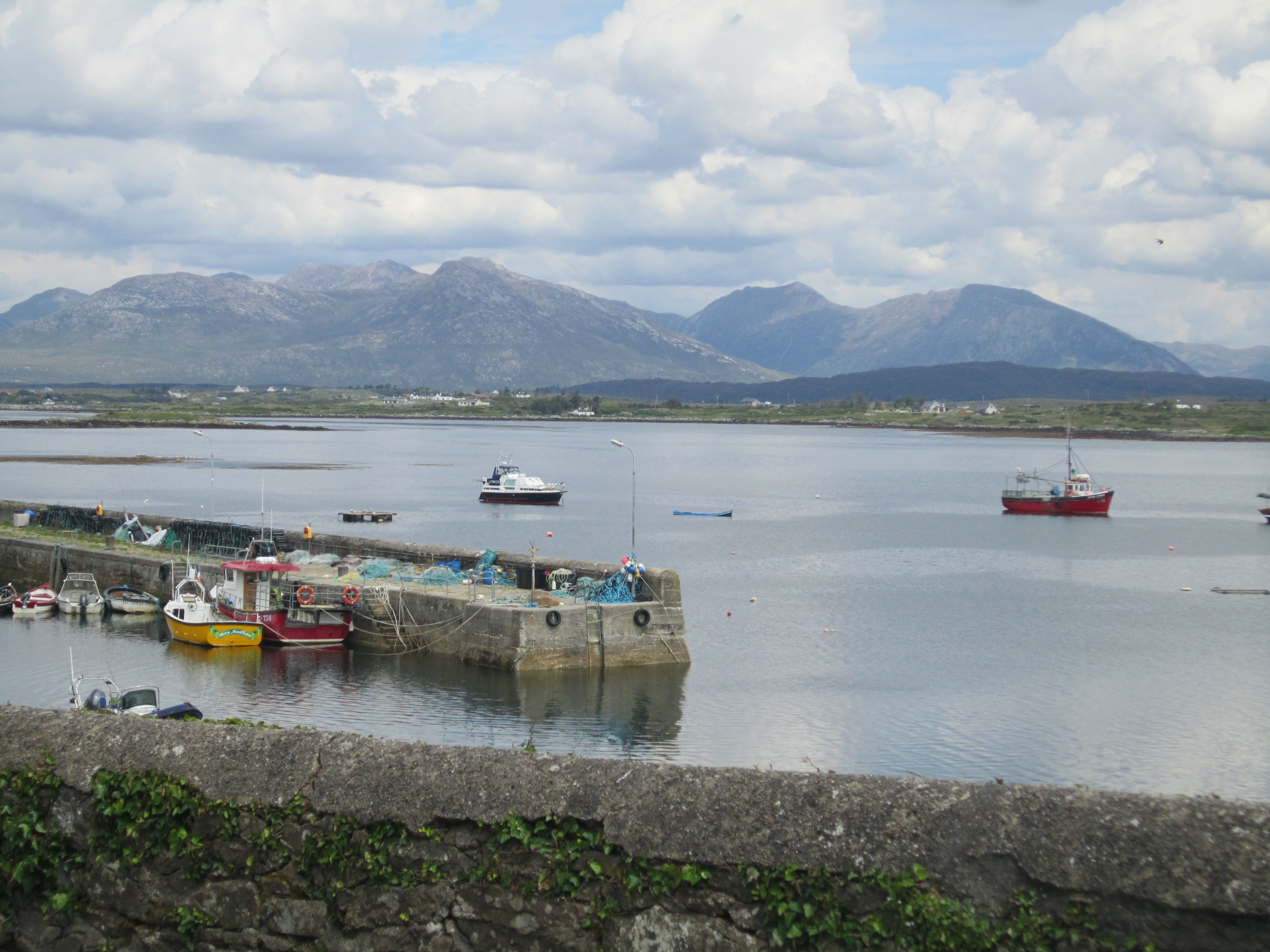
- View of the range from Roundstone village.

Highest point
- Peak: Benbaun
- Elevation: 729 m (2,392 ft)
- Coordinates: 53.50°N 9.81°W

Dimensions
- Area: 161.3 km^{2} (62.3 mi^{2})

Naming
- Native name: Na Beanna Beola
- English translation: The peaks of Beola (Note: The translation is "the peaks of Beola" who was believed to be a giant and chieftain of the Fir Bolg, whose name features in the village Tuaim Beola (Toombeola).)

Geography
- Location within Ireland
- Location: Connemara, County Galway, Ireland
- Provinces of Ireland: Connacht
- Topo map: OSI Discovery 37, 44

Geology
- Rock age: Precambrian-Cambrian
- Rock type(s): quartzites, grits, graphitic

The Twelve Bens or Twelve Pins, also called the Benna Beola (Irish: Na Beanna Beola, meaning 'the peaks of Beola'), is a mountain range of mostly sharp-peaked quartzite summits and ridges in Connemara National Park (Note: Only part of the range is inside the boundary of the Connemara National Park; the rest is on private property, but climbing access is granted.) in County Galway, in the west of Ireland. The widest definition of the range includes the Garraun Complex to the north as well as several isolated peaks to the west, and is designated a 16,163-hectare (39,940-acre) Special Area of Conservation.

The highest point is Benbaun at 729 metres (2,392 ft). The range is a popular location for hill-walking activities with the 16–kilometre 8–9 hour Glencoaghan Horseshoe, considered one of the best ridge-walks in Ireland. Topographically, the range is partnered with the Maumturks range to the east of the Inagh valley (a Western Way route); and both share a common geology being largely composed of metamorphic marine rocks, being predominantly resistant quartzite but with deposits of schists in the valleys (known as Connemara Dalradian rocks).

== Naming ==
"Ben" is an anglicized form of the Irish word binn, meaning "peak". According to Irish academic Paul Tempan, (Note: Paul Tempan was a research fellow in the Department of Irish and Celtic Studies at Queen's University Belfast, and who was part of the Northern Ireland place names project,; in 2010, Tempan wrote the Irish Hill and Mountain Names, collating the accepted names (e.g from academic research, the Placenames Database of Ireland (loganim.ie), and the Ordnance Survey Ireland) for Irish mountains from the MountainViews database, and which he updated in 2012.) "An odd thing about the Twelve Bens of Connemara is that nobody seems to know exactly which are the twelve peaks in question", and noting that there are almost 20 peaks with "Ben" or "Binn" in their name. Tempan notes that term "twelve peaks" can be at least dated to the Irish historian Ruaidhrí Ó Flaithbheartaigh, whose writings in 1684 said: "On the north-west of Ballynahinsy [Ballynahinch], are the twelve high mountaines of Bennabeola, called by marriners the twelve stakes [stacks], being the first land they discover as they come from the maine [sea]", but he did not list them.

The most common list of the twelve peaks in question are the peaks with an elevation above 500 metres in the core range, and that are not considered subsidiary peaks (e.g. they have a non-trivial prominence, and have been traditionally noted as peaks on historic maps, per § List of peaks below).

Tempan notes the issue of "twelve" does not arise in the Irish language name as they are simply labelled Na Beanna Beola, which translates as "the peaks of Beola". Beola was a leader of the Fir Bolg, and a giant; his name appears in that of the Connemara village Toombeola.

== Geography ==
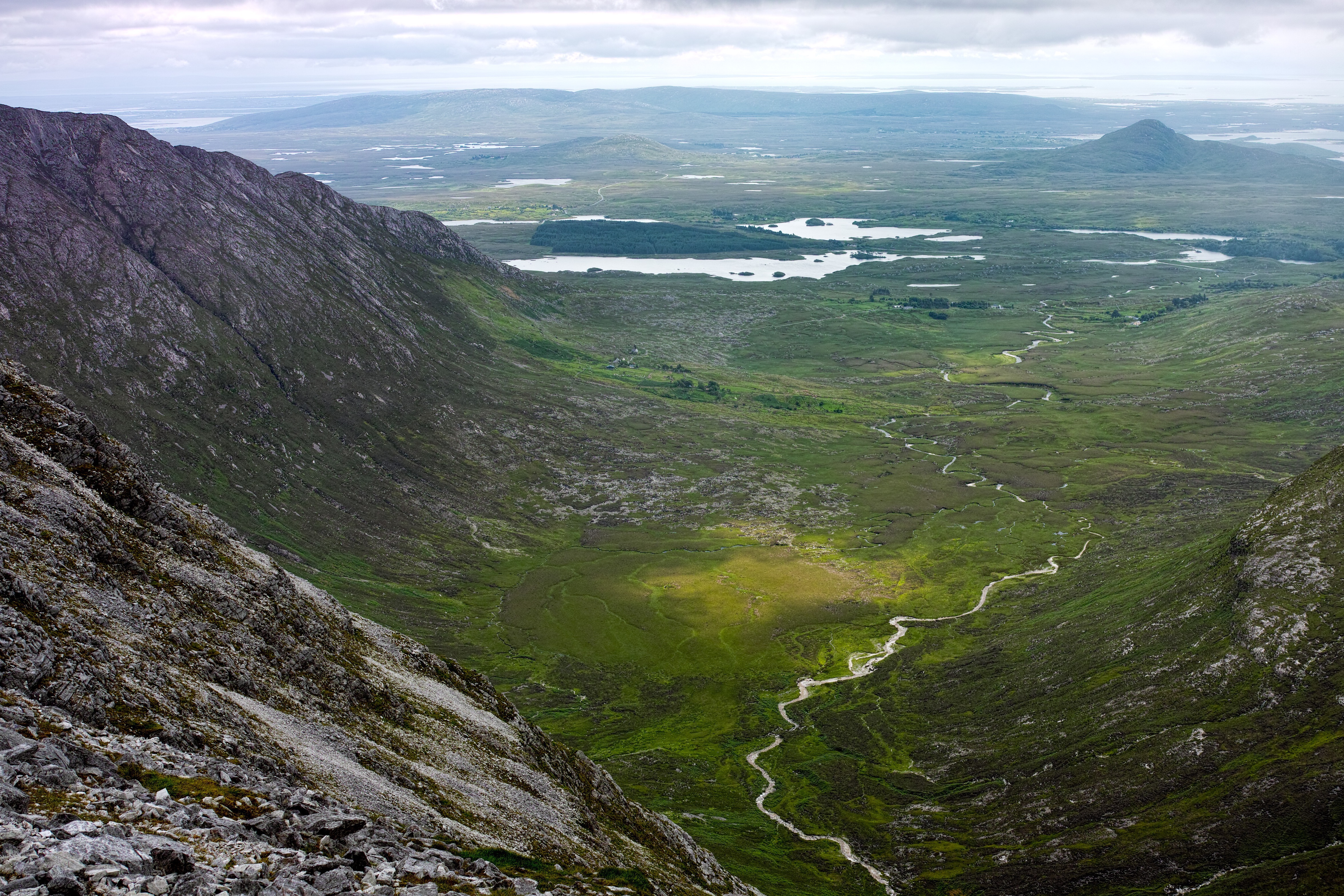
Glencoaghan River from Bencullaghduff

The Twelve Bens range is a core massif of 22 peaks above 100 metres (330 ft) in elevation, centred around the highest peak in the range, Benbaun 729 metres (2,392 ft). To the north of this core massif lies the separate subsidiary massif of the Garraun Complex with 9 peaks around Garraun 598 metres (1,962 ft). To the west of the core massif lies 7 other isolated or subsidiary "outlier" peaks, thus giving a total of 38 Bens with an elevation above 100 metres.

While the Bens are not as high as those of the ranges in County Kerry (e.g. MacGillycuddy's Reeks and Mount Brandon), their rocky peaks and ridges contrast with the surrounding sea-level landscape (unlike Kerry, there are no mountain-passes in Connemara), and give the range an imposing feel.

The range is bounded by the Inagh Valley and the R344 road to the east, while the N59 road (or the "Clifden Road"), circles and bounds the core massif (and most of the outliers), from the southerly, westerly and northerly directions. The Garraun Complex lies to the north of the N59 road at Kylemore Lough.

=== Core massif ===
The 22 peaks in the core massif of the Twelve Bens range naturally split into three sections:

1. Southern Bens, 12 southern Bens form a horseshoe around the Glencoaghan Valley, and include the 7 major Bens of: Derryclare, Bencorr, Bencollaghduff, Benbreen, Bengower, Benlettery, and Benglenisky; and 5 subsidiary Bens of: Bencorr North Top, Benbreen Central Top, Benbreen North Top, Binn an tSaighdiúra, and Bencorrbeg; and
2. Central Bens, 7 central Bens that sit along a large east-west ridge with Benbaun at its centre, and include the 4 major Bens of Benbaun, Benfree, Muckanaght, and Bencullagh; and the 3 subsidiary Bens of Knockpasheemore, Maumonght, and Maumonght SW Top; and
3. Northern Bens, 3 northern Bens that lies on the small massif of the major Ben of Benbrack, and include the 2 subsidiary Bens of Knockbrack and another smaller peak called, Benbaun; just beside the Northern Bens lies the outlier Ben of Diamond Hill.

The core massif is also known for its deep glaciated U-shaped valleys, around which groups of Bens lie in a "horseshoe formation":

1. Glencoaghan: most southerly valley from which the Glencoaghan River flows; the Glencoaghan Horseshoe is a major hill-walking route in Ireland;
2. Owenglin: western valley from which the Owenglin River flows; the Owenglin Horseshoe is also a noted hill-walking route;
3. Gleninagh: eastern valley from which the Gleninagh River flows; contains Carrot Ridge, an important area for rock-climbing;
4. Polladirk: north-westerly valley from which the Polladirk River flows; a popular scenic view from Diamond Hill is into this valley;
5. Glencorbet: north-easterly valley from which the Kylemore River flows; the Glencorbet Horseshoe is a popular route in the Bens.

== Geology ==
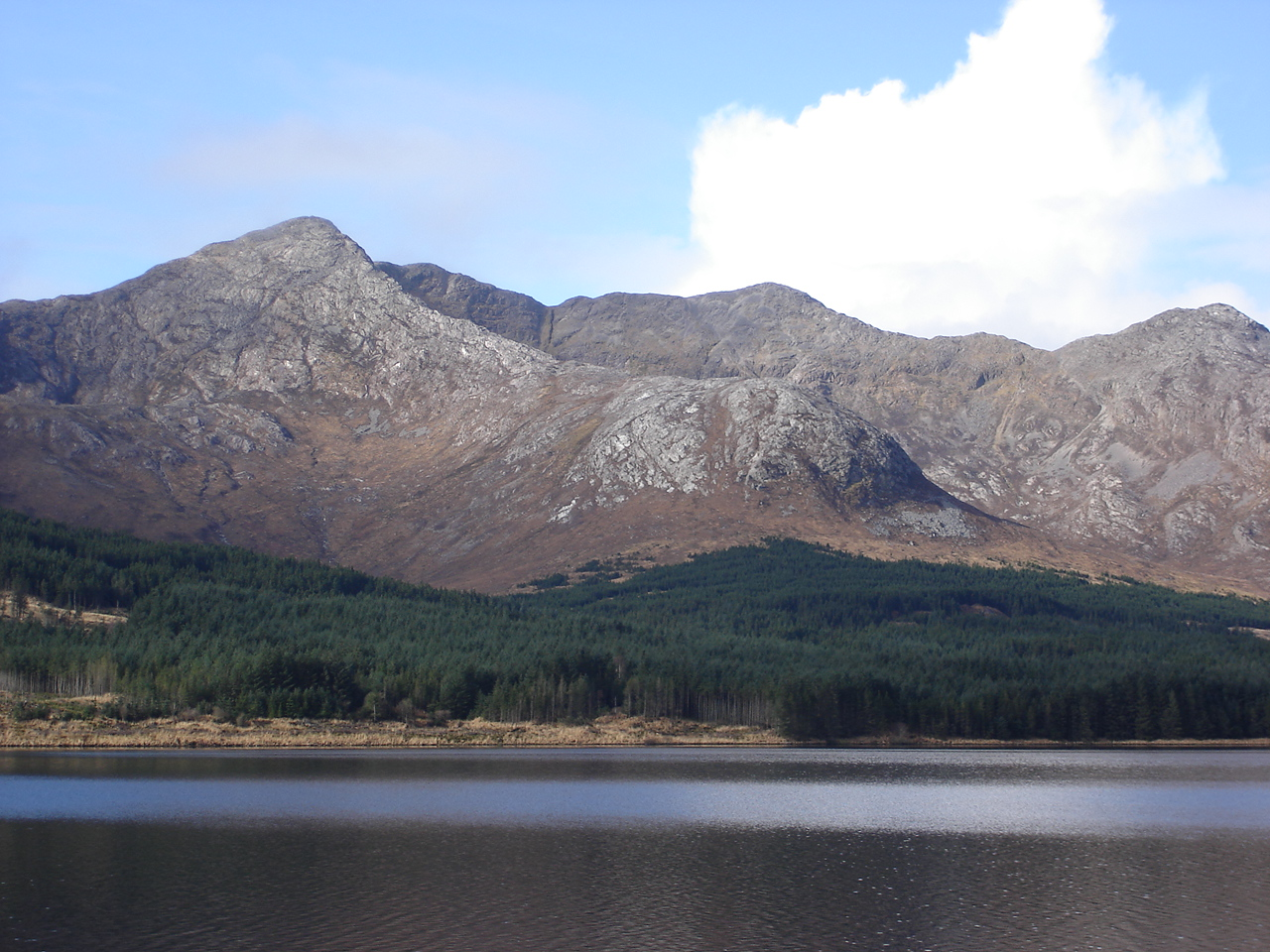
Quartzite peaks and rocky ridges of Bencorr and its subsidiary peaks and spurs

The core massif of the Twelve Bens range is largely composed of metamorphic marine rocks, being predominantly resistant quartzite but with deposits of schists in the valleys (known as "Connemara Dalradian" rocks).

These rocks derive from sediments that were deposited in a warm shelf sea some 700 to 550 million years ago (e.g. Precambrian-Cambrian). Movements in the Earth's crust, and the closure of the Iapetus Ocean, transformed these sediments into crystalline schists that lie underneath the base of the mountain range, which local erosion and uplift then brought to the surface. The summits of the core massif (and some outliers) are made of weather-resistant quartzite, while the sides of the peaks are composed of schists and grey marbles.

In contrast, the mountains to the north of the core Twelve Bens massif, the Garraun Complex, have a different type of geology, that is composed of gneiss and different forms of sandstones and mudstones.

Scattered throughout the range are parts of gabbro (Doughruagh and Currywongaun), mica schist (Muckanaght), and outcrops of marble (south of Kylemore Lough).

The final Ice Age, circa 10,000 years ago, also sculpted the landscape leaving behind deposits of sand and gravel; there are widespread boulder-clay and erratic boulders across the range.

== Special Area of Conservation (SAC) ==
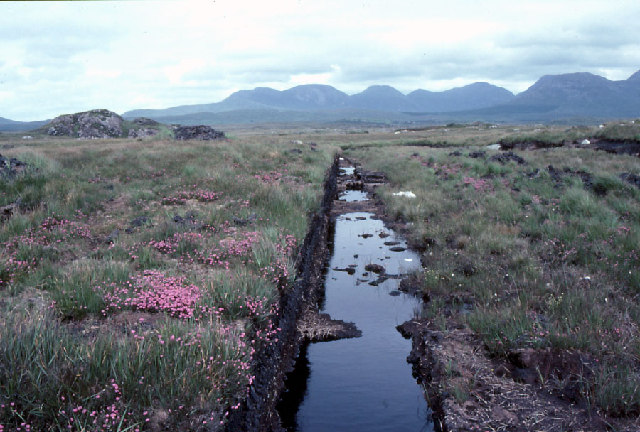
The range includes extensive bog habitats

The entire Twelve Bens range (including the Garraun Complex) is a Special Area of Conservation (SAC) (Site Code:002031), as selected for a range of habitats and species listed under the Annex I / II of the E.U. Habitats Directive. The items of note on the SAC habitats list includes: Oligotrophic Waters, Alpine Heaths, Active Blanket Bogs, remnants of Oak Woodland, Rhynchosporion Vegetation, and Siliceous Scree and Rocky Slopes; while the species list includes: Freshwater Pearl Mussel, Atlantic Salmon, Otter, and Slender Naiad. In addition, the 16,163-hectare site includes some of the rarer Red Data Book species of plant. The SAC directive on the range describes it as "One of the largest and most varied sites of conservation interest in Ireland".

== Climbing ==
The range is popular with hill walkers, fell runners, and rock climbers,

=== Hill walking ===
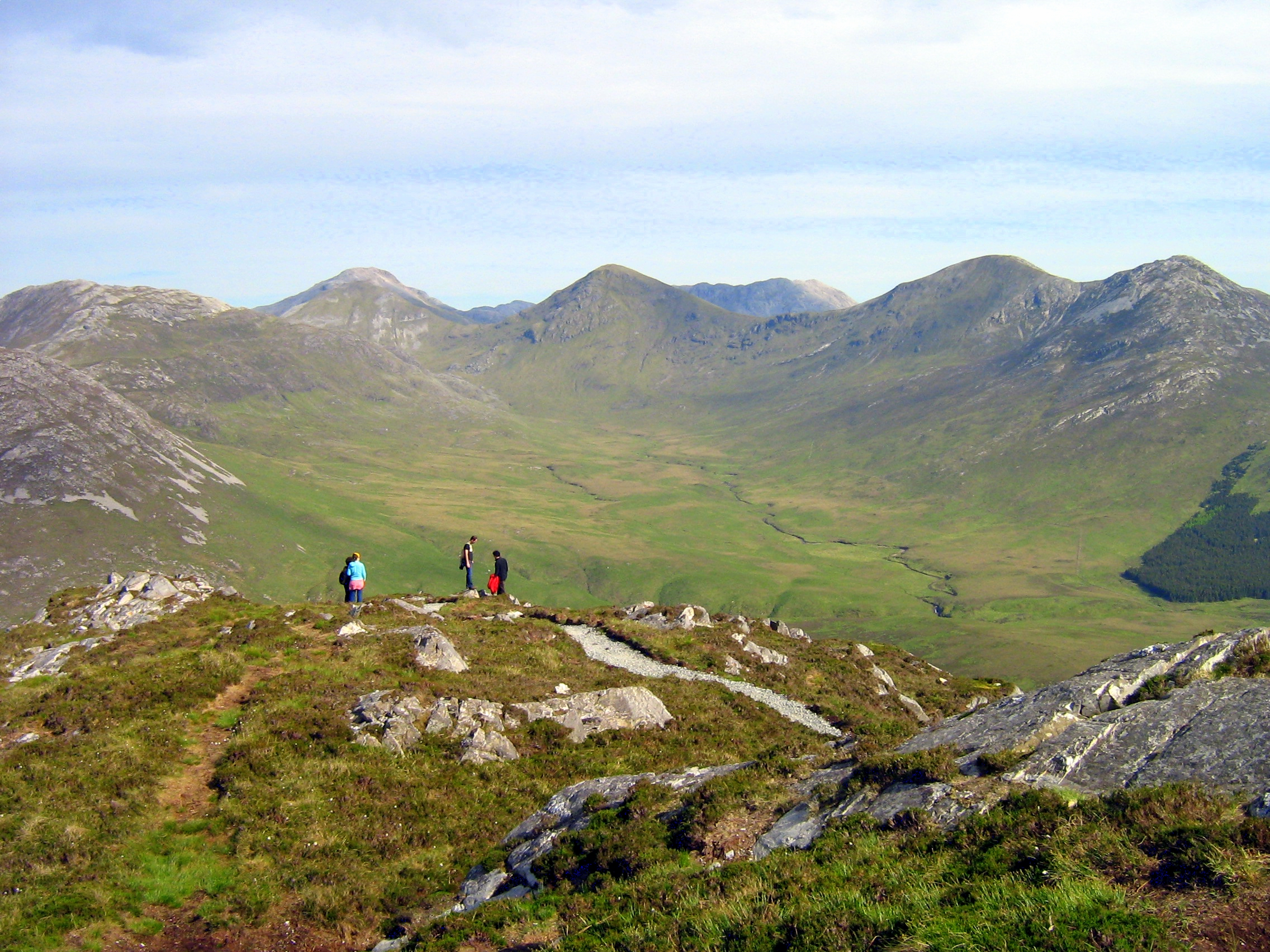
View of Polladirk Valley from Diamond Hill.

The Irish Times outdoors correspondent, John G. Dwyer, said of the Twelve Bens, "These are true kickass mountains, with criminally stunning views [..]".

The 16-kilometre (9.9 mi) 8–9 hour Glencoaghan Horseshoe (Note: Also known as the "Derryclare Horseshoe" as it is normally started from the Derryclare end (e.g. counterclockwise), is a 14 to 16 kilometres (8.7 to 9.9 mi) horseshoe-shaped circuit (the final length depending on whether the loop is completed by walking back to the base of Derryclare), that takes in six of the twelve bens, almost 5,000 ft (1,500 m) of elevation, and takes circa 6 to 9 hours to complete depending on ability and fitness.) is noted as providing some of the "most exhilarating mountaineering in Ireland", and is called "a true classic" by guidebook authors. Other similar distanced "horseshoe" loop walks are the 19–kilometre 10–12 hour Owenglin Horseshoe, the 15–kilometre 8–9 hour Gleninagh Horseshoe, and the 14–kilometre 6–7 hour Glencorbet Horseshoe.

An even more serious undertaking is the 28-kilometre (17 mi) "Twelve Bens Challenge", climbing all 12 Bens in a single 24-hour day. (Note: The "12 Bens Challenge" was organised by the Beanna Beola Hillwalking Club on a yearly basis since 2006; it is for advanced hill-walkers only, and covers 28 kilometres (17 mi), 8,300 ft (2,500 m) of elevation, and takes circa 12–14 hours to complete.)

=== Rock climbing ===
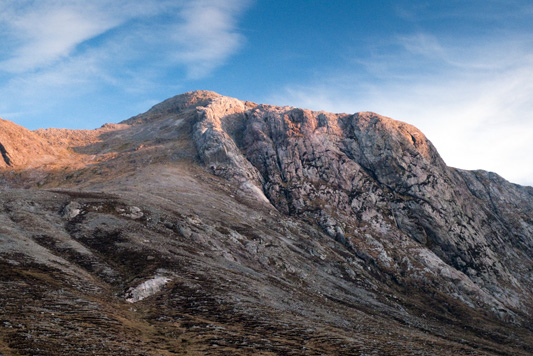
Carrot Ridge in the Gleninagh Valley

The Twelve Bens have a number of rock climbing locations, the most notable of which is in the Gleann Eighneach valley at the eastern spur of Benncorr (from Binn an tSaighdiúra to Bencorrbeg; also called "Carrot Ridge"). The climbs vary from Diff (D) to Very Severe (VS) and range from 150 metres to 320 metres in length, with notable routes being Carrot Ridge (275m D), and Seventh Heaven (330m HS).

In addition, the large easterly corrie between the summits of Derryclare and the summit of Bencorr, known as Irish: Log an Choire Mhóir (meaning "wood of the big corrie"), also contains several large 200 metre multi-pitch graded rock climbs at grades of Diff (D) to Very Diff (VD), the most notable of which is "The Knave" (VD, 225 m); and the smaller corrie between the summit of Bencorr and the summit of Bencorr North Top, known as Log an Choire Bhig, ("wood of the small corrie"), has a number of shorter but harder climbs including "Corner Climb" (VS 4c, 30 m).

== List of peaks ==
The following is a download from the MountainViews Online Database, who list 38 identifiable peaks in the wider Twelve Bens range (i.e. core massif, Garraun complex, and various outliers to the west), with an elevation, or height, above 100 metres (328 ft)

The list below highlights the 12 Bens most associated with being the Twelve Bens from Ó Flaithbheartaigh's original record. Of the standalone "Bens" (e.g. not listed as a "Top" of a parent Ben) that are over 500 metres (1,640 ft) in height but are not listed in this 12, Binn an tSaighdiúra has a prominence of only 8 metres and would not qualify as an independent mountain on any recognised scale (the lowest prominence is 15 metres for the Vandeleur-Lynam classification); Maumonght does have a prominence exceeding 50 metres, and even has a subsidiary peak (Maumonght SW Top), however, Maumonght rarely appears on historic maps of the range and is not considered a "Ben"; Bencorrbeag also has a non-trivial prominence of 42 metres, however, it is considered unlikely given its positioning that it could have been distinguished by mariners from the sea (Ó Flaithbheartaigh's original premise).

One of the original Twelve Bens; equated to all non-subsidiary peaks in the core massif with height above 500 metres (1,640 ft)
Marilyn: Any height, and prominence over 150 metres (492 ft).

Peaks of the Twelve Bens Mountain range (MountainViews Online Database, July 2019)
Height Rank	Prom. Rank	Name	Irish Name (if different)	Translation	Area	Height (m)	Prom. (m)	Height (ft)	Prom. (ft)	Topo Map	OSI Grid Reference
1	1	Benbaun	Binn Bhán	White Peak (Note: The name is assumed to derive from the abundance of white quartzite rock on its summit)	12 Bens - Core	729	684	2,392	2,244	37	L786539
2	4	Bencorr	Binn Chorr (Note: Cartographer and climbing author Tim Robinson gave an alternative name of Irish: Binn an Choire Mhóir meaning "peak of the big corrie". The British sappers set up a beacon on this peak during the first Ordnance Survey in Ireland.)	Pointed Peak	12 Bens - Core	711	306	2,333	1,004	37	L812522
3	10	Bencollaghduff	Binn Dubh	Black Peak/Peak of Black Hags (Note: The "black hags" are not referring to witches, but to cormorant birds.)	12 Bens - Core	696	191	2,283	627	37	L798530
4	11	Benbreen	Binn Braoin	Braon's Peak (Note: Braon in the Irish language can mean "drip" or "drop", but is more likely related to the Irish personal name, and it is the basis of the surnames Ó Braoin and Mac Braoin, anglicised as Breen and McBreen in the area.)	12 Bens - Core	691	186	2,267	610	37	L783515
5	38	Bencorr North Top	—	—	12 Bens - Core	690	5	2,264	16	37	L809524
6	31	Benbreen Central Top	—	—	12 Bens - Core	680	25	2,231	82	37	L781520
7	16	Derryclare	Binn Doire Chláir (Note: The Irish language term "clár", can mean both a "plain" and a "board"/"plank-bridge". Thus Derryclare, from "Doire Chláir", could mean 'oak-wood of the plain' or 'oak-wood of the plank-bridge'. The name seems to have been transferred by the Ordnance Survey from the townland of Derryclare situated to the east to the mountain itself.)	Peak of Derryclare	12 Bens - Core	677	129	2,221	423	37	L815510
8	35	Benbreen North Top	—	—	12 Bens - Core	674	16	2,211	52	37	L784522
9	9	Bengower (Note: Mistakenly marked as "Glengower" on the Discovery series OS map.)	Binn Gabhar	Goats' Peak	12 Bens - Core	664	196	2,178	643	37	L783507
10	12	Muckanaght	Muiceanach	Hill like a Pig	12 Bens - Core	654	179	2,146	587	37	L767541
11	37	Binn an tSaighdiúra	—	Peak of the Soldier (Note: It is said that a British sapper from the first Ordnance Survey in Ireland fell to his death here during survey work on the first 6-map series in the 1830s.)	12 Bens - Core	653	8	2,142	26	37	L811528
12	24	Benfree	Binn Fraoigh	Peak of the Heather (Note: On the Discovery OS map this peak is marked as "Luggatarriff", meaning "hollow of the bull", which Paul Tempan notes probably applies to a hollow on the slopes of Benfree.)	12 Bens - Core	638	48	2,093	157	37	L778544
13	14	Bencullagh	An Chailleach	[Peak of] The Hag/Witch (Note: A woman known as "Cailleach an Chlocháin", meaning "the witch of Clifden", was a famous character in the 19th-century.)	12 Bens - Core	632	154	2,073	505	37	L756537
14	23	Maumonght (Note: Despite its non-trivial prominence, Maumonght is unnamed on many maps, including Tim Robinson's map, however, a lower peak to the SW at 454 metres, is named Binn Bhreac (properly Maumonght SW Top). This may explain why Maumonght rarely appears in any list of the actual 12 Bens. "Maumonght" is also odd as an anglicised form, as Paul Tempan notes that it does not suggest any Irish version, and wonders if it was a typo for "Maumought".)	Mám Uchta	Pass of the Breast/Ridge	12 Bens - Core	602	54	1,975	177	37	L749539
15	2	Garraun (Note: Paul Tempan notes that Garraun is clearly also a name of Irish origin, and may either be from the Irish name "garrán" (meaning grove), or, more likely, from the Irish name "géarán" (meaning "fang"). While the summit of Garraun is flattish, the eastern ridge leading to it is sharp enough to have deserved the name of "fang". Tempan notes that the name "Maolchnoc" could be the true Irish name for the rounded summit, while "An Géarán" would denote the sharp ridge descending to Lough Fee.)	Maolchnoc	Bald Hill	Garraun Complex	598	553	1,962	1,814	37	L767610
16	36	Benchoona East Top	—	—	Garraun Complex	585	15	1,919	49	37	L766616
17	7	Benbrack	Binn Bhreac	Speckled Peak (Note: The summit of this mountain is strewn with lumps of white quartz.)	12 Bens - Core	582	264	1,909	866	37	L766558
18	28	Benchoona	Binn Chuanna	Peak of Cuanna (Note: Cuanna is probably a personal name. A townland nearby is named Tooreenacoona ("Tuairín Uí Chuanna", meaning "O'Cooney's Green").)	Garraun Complex	581	36	1,906	118	37	L763617
19	21	Benlettery	Binn Leitrí	Peak of the Wet Hillsides (Note: The townland of Lettery (Irish: Leitrí, "wet hillsides") is on the southerly slopes of the peak. Another name Bindowglass or Bendouglas (Irish: Binn Dúghlais, "peak of the black stream") is recorded as early as 1684 by Ruaidhrí Ó Flaithbheartaigh; both names referring to the wet state of the peak. Ó Flaithbheartaigh mentions a pool of water on the summit which turns the hair white of anyone who washes in it.)	12 Bens - Core	577	62	1,893	203	44	L775495
20	26	Bencorrbeg	Binn an Choire Bhig	Peak of the Little Corrie	12 Bens - Core	577	42	1,893	138	37	L816533
21	29	Garraun South Top	—	—	Garraun Complex	556	31	1,824	102	37	L763606
22	32	Garraun South-West Top	—	—	Garraun Complex	549	21	1,801	69	37	L755607
23	8	Doughruagh	Dúchruach	Black Stack	Garraun Complex	526	211	1,726	692	37	L751594
24	33	Doughruagh South Top	—	—	Garraun Complex	525	17	1,722	56	37	L751592
25	25	Benglenisky	Binn Ghleann Uisce	Peak of the Glen of Water	12 Bens - Core	516	48	1,693	157	37	L766501
26	27	Benbaun (477 m)	Binn Bhán/Maolán	White Peak	12 Bens - Core	477	42	1,565	138	37	L765568
27	30	Maumonght SW Top	Binn Bhreac	Speckled Peak	12 Bens - Core	454	29	1,490	95	37	L744534
28	5	Diamond Hill	Binn Ghuaire	Guaire's Peak (Note: Guaire Aidne was a king of Connacht, and Bengooria is an anglicised form of Binn Ghuaire.)	12 Bens - Outlier	442	277	1,450	909	37	L732571
29	22	Knockbrack	Cnoc Breac	Speckled Hill	12 Bens - Core	442	55	1,450	180	37	L749565
30	34	Knockpasheemore	Binn Charrach	Rocky Peak	12 Bens - Core	412	17	1,352	56	37	L807557
31	3	Tully Mountain	—	—	12 Bens - Outlier	356	331	1,168	1,086	37	L673611
32	6	Letterettrin (Note: This hill is in the townland of Letterettrin / Irish: Leitir Eitreann, meaning "hillside of furrows".)	Binn Mhór	Big Peak	Garraun Complex	333	268	1,093	879	37	L796620
33	15	Cregg	—	—	12 Bens - Outlier	297	142	974	466	37	L715524
34	20	Currywongaun	Corr Uí Mhongáin	Uí Mhongáin's Hill	Garraun Complex	273	109	896	358	37	L731596
35	18	Townaloughra East Top	—	—	12 Bens - Outlier	216	112	709	367	37	L688541
36	19	Gortrumnagh	(unknown)	(unknown)	12 Bens - Outlier	174	110	571	361	37	L628516
37	13	Maumfin	Mám Fionn	White Pass	12 Bens - Outlier	172	157	564	515	37	L647588
38	17	Knockaunbaun	An Cnocán Bán	White Hillock	12 Bens - Outlier	146	128	479	420	37	L605596

== See also ==
- Mweelrea, major range in Killary Harbour
- Maumturks, major range in Connemara
- List of Irish counties by highest point
- Lists of mountains in Ireland
- Lists of mountains and hills in the British Isles
