= Ballynahinch =

Ballynahinch may refer to:

== Northern Ireland ==
- Ballynahinch, County Armagh, a townland; see List of townlands of County Armagh
- Ballynahinch, County Down, a town

== Republic of Ireland ==
- Ballynahinch (barony), in County Galway
- Ballynahinch, County Galway, a townland in County Galway
- Ballynahinch, County Longford, a townland in Cashel civil parish, barony of Rathcline
- Ballynahinch, County Offaly, a townland in Kilcumreragh civil parish, barony of Kilcoursey
- Ballynahinch, County Tipperary, a townland; see List of townlands of County Tipperary
