= Garraun (Galway) =

Mountain in County Galway, Ireland

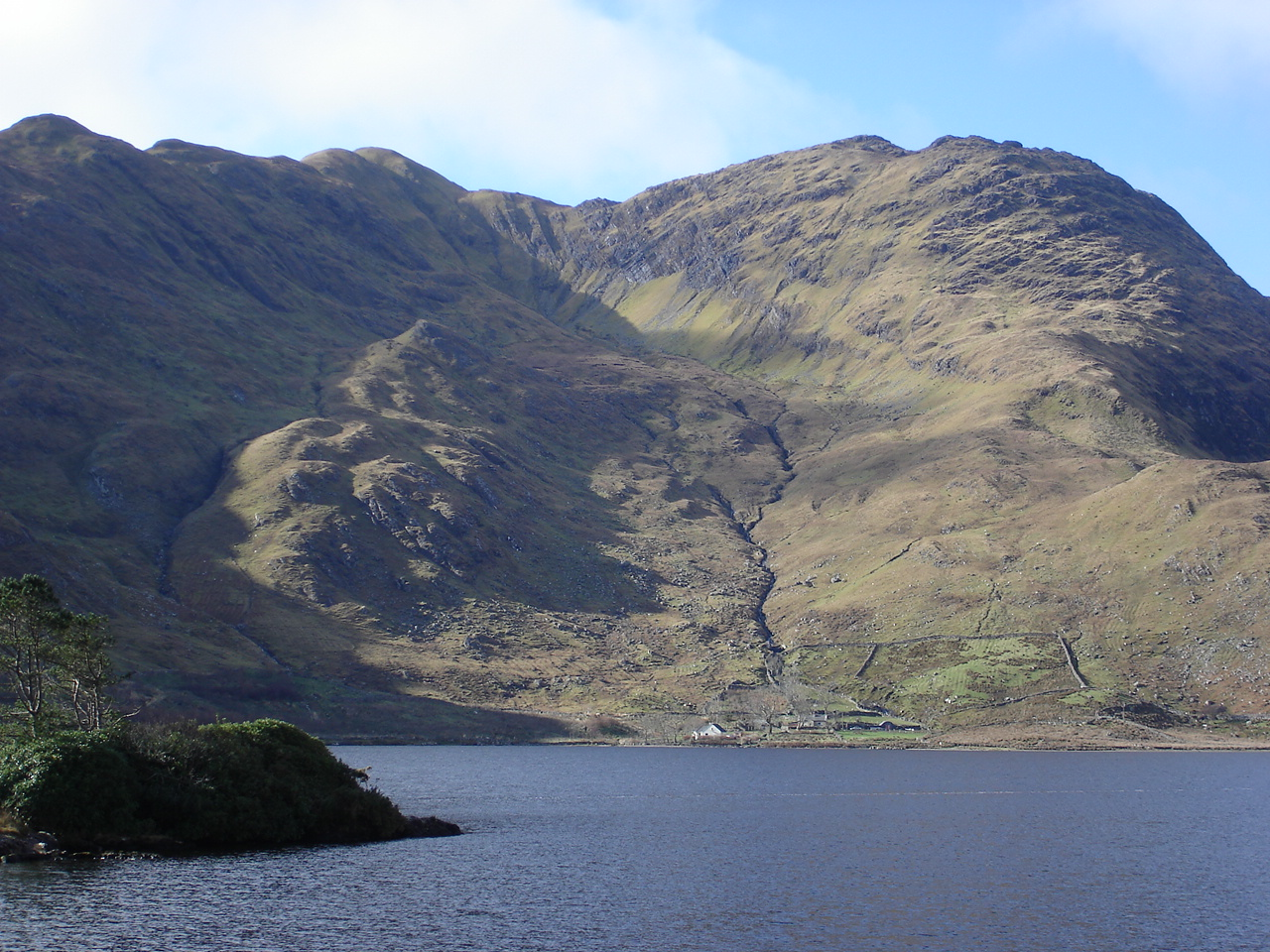
- The east faces of Garraun (left), and Benchoona (right), from across Lough Fee

Highest point
- Elevation: 598 m (1,962 ft)
- Prominence: 553 m (1,814 ft)
- Listing: Marilyn, Arderin
- Coordinates: 53°35′05″N 9°51′45″W

Naming
- Native name: Maolchnoc
- English translation: bald peak

Geography
- Location within island of Ireland
- Location: County Galway, Ireland
- Parent range: Twelve Bens SAC
- OSI/OSNI grid: L7670861036
- Topo map: OSi Discovery 37

Geology
- Rock type(s): Schists, grits, metavolcanics, mylonitic Bedrock

Garraun (Irish: Maolchnoc, meaning 'bald hill') at 598 metres (1,962 ft), is the 224th–highest peak in Ireland on the Arderin scale, however, while it is just short of the elevation threshold of 600-metres for other classifications (e.g. Vandeleur-Lynam, and Hewitt), it does have the prominence to be a Marilyn. Garraun lies on an isolated massif near the mouth of Killary Harbour at the far north sector of the Twelve Bens/Garraun Complex Special Area of Conservation in the Connemara National Park in County Galway. The southern slopes are a scenic backdrop to Kylemore Abbey and Kylemore Lough.

== Naming ==
Irish academic Paul Tempan notes that Garraun is clearly a name of Irish origin, either from Irish: garrán, meaning "grove", or more likely from Irish: géarán, meaning "fang"; while the summit is flat, the eastern ridge leading to it is sharp enough to have merited such a name.

Tim Robinson notes that Irish: Maolchnoc, meaning "bald hill", is the more common name in the area; it more correctly describes the shape of the summit of Garraun; while Irish: An Géarán likely refers to the sharp eastern ridge that descends to Lough Fee.

Tempan notes that the townland on the south slopes of Garraun South Top, that runs to Kylemore Lough, is called "Lemnaheltia" (Irish: Léim na hEilte, meaning "the doe's leap"), and this name appears on Mercator's map of Ireland (1595) as Dosleape for the mountain (or the cliffs below the summit). A legend tells of Fionn Mac Cumhail's dog Bran, who pursued a doe in this area, however, when the doe leapt from the summit, Bran fell from the cliff into the lake. Many Irish places claim variations of this story, including "Lough Brin" (Irish: Loch Broin, meaning "Bran's lake") south of the MacGillycuddy Reeks, in County Kerry.

== Geography ==
Garraun is a flat featureless summit that lies on its own isolated massif close to the entrance to Killary Harbour, Ireland's largest fjord, and is part of the Twelve Bens/Garraun Complex special area of conservation in Connemara; the Garraun massif is considered part of the Twelve Bens mountain range.

To the west of Garraun, via a high ridge, is the subsidiary peak of Garraun South Top 556 metres (1,824 ft), which overlooks Kylemore Lough, and whose prominence of 31 metres (102 ft) qualifies it as an Arderin. Further west, is the sharp summit of Garraun South-West Top 549 metres (1,801 ft), whose prominence of 21 metres (69 ft) qualifies it as an Arderin Beg. Garraun South-West Top is marked "Altnagaighera" (or "ravine of the sheep"), on some maps. Altnagaighera is noted for its conglomerate Tors that are scattered around its summit.

Further southwest again, lies the double-top summit of Doughruagh 526 metres (1,726 ft) (Irish: Dúchruach, meaning "black stack"), which directly overlooks Kylemore Abbey (and thus features in photographs and paintings of the abbey), and whose prominence of 211 metres (692 ft) qualifies it as an Arderin, and a Marilyn. Half-way up the south face of Doughraugh, on very steep ground, is a statue of the Sacred Heart, erected in 1932 by the Benedictine nuns of Kylemore Abbey, in thanks for their safe delivery from their previous home in Ypres in Belgium, which they had to abandon during World War One.

East of Garraun is a long sharp spur (which Tempan thinks was probably Irish: An Géarán), leading to Lough Fee. To the north of Garraun is Benchoona 585 metres (1,919 ft) (Irish: Binn Chuanna, meaning "peak of Cuanna"), whose prominence of 31 metres (102 ft) qualifies it as an Arderin. Benchoona has a subsidiary peak, Benchoona East Top 581 metres (1,906 ft), whose prominence of 15 metres (49 ft) qualifies it as an Arderin Beg. Robert Macfarlane described Benchoona's summit as "a rough broken tableland of flat rocks, perhaps a quarter of an acre in area, and planed smooth by the old ice".

Garraun has two satellite peaks. To the east, across Lough Fee, is the isolated peak of Letterettrin 333 metres (1,093 ft) (Irish: Leitir Eitreann, meaning "hillside of furrows"), which is also called Irish: Binn Mhór (meaning "big peak"; not to be confused with Binn Mhór in the Maumturks range), and whose prominence of 268 metres (879 ft) qualifies it as a Marilyn. To the west is Currywongaun 273 metres (896 ft) (Irish: Corr Uí Mhongáin, meaning "Uí Mhongáin's round or pointed hill").

== Hill walking ==
The most straightforward route to climb Gaurran is via its sharp east spur at Lough Fee; the 5-kilometre 2.5-hour round trip uses the car-park at the distinctively roofed Creeragh Church, off the N59 road.

Another recommended trail is the 9-kilometre 4-hour Lettergesh Loop or Benchoona Horseshoe, that starts from Lettergesh Beach in the car-park at Carrickglass (L737 630), taking the path to Cloonagh (Irish: Cluain Ard), and climbing a loop around Benchoona, Garraun, and Garraun South-West Top (or Altnagaighera) before returning via Cloonagh.

Various other 8-10 kilometre 4-5 hour routes, take in the summit of Doughruagh, and the shores of Kylemore Lough and Pollacappul Lough, in a loop with Garraun and Altnagaighera.

== Gallery ==
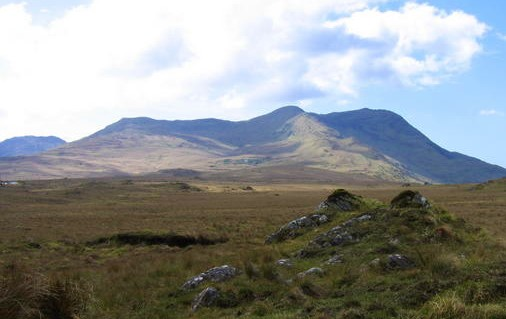
Garraun (left and centre) and Benchoona (right) as viewed from the N59 road in the east

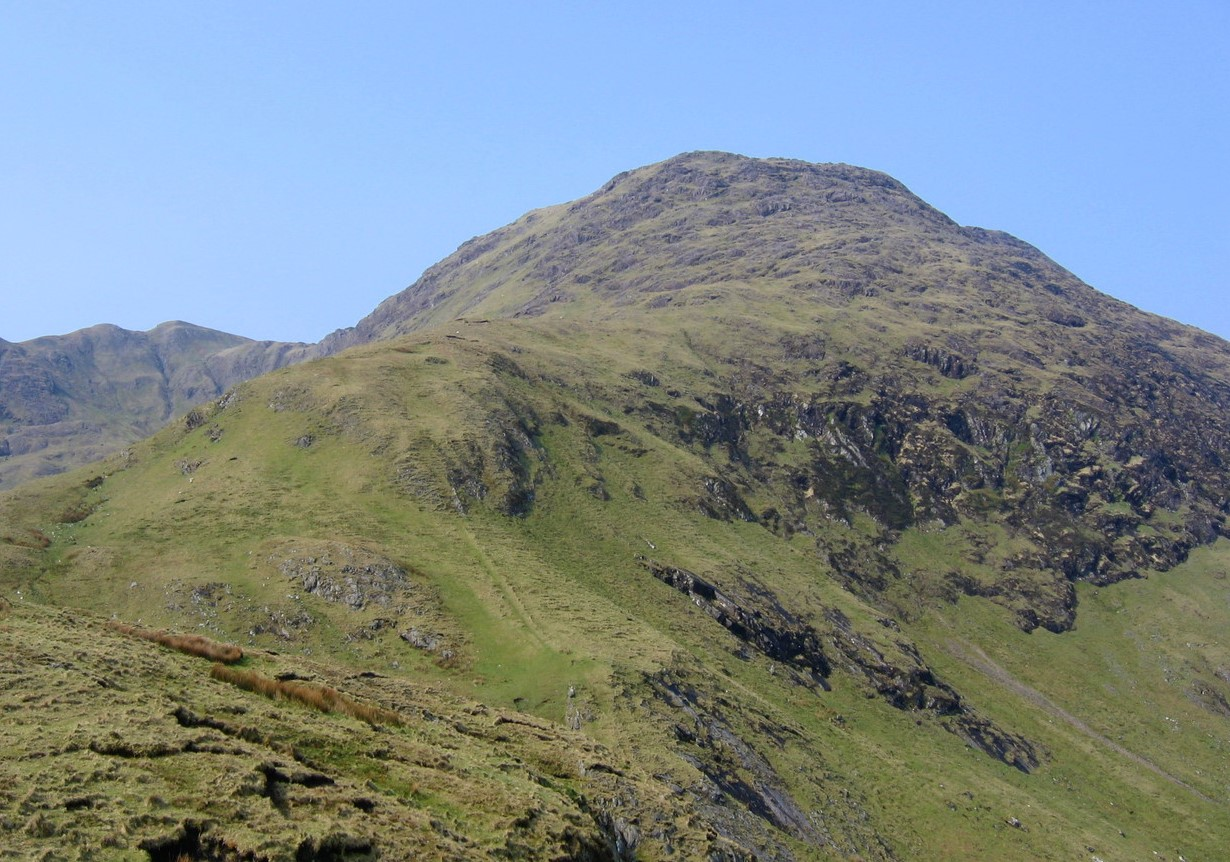
Summit of Benchoona viewed from the east

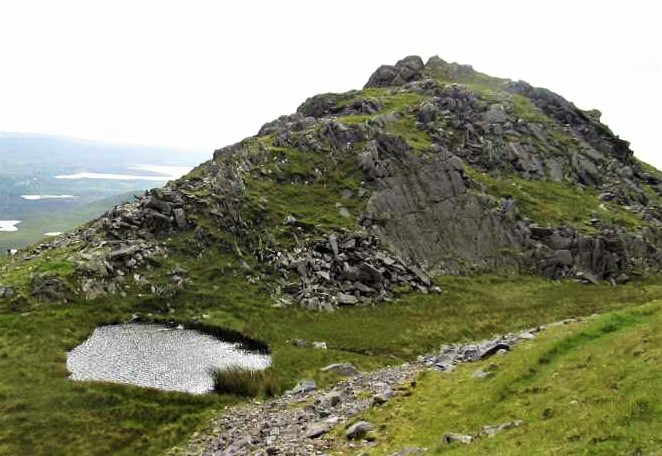
Garraun South-West Top (also called Altnagaighera)

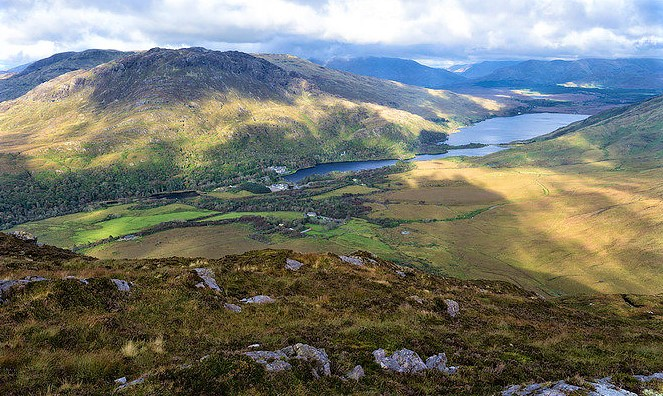
Doughruagh, Kylemore Abbey, and the Garraun massif behind, viewed from Diamond Hill

== Bibliography ==
- MountainViews Online Database (Simon Stewart) (2013). A Guide to Ireland's Mountain Summits: The Vandeleur-Lynams & the Arderins. Collins Books. ISBN 978-1-84889-164-7.
- Paul Phelan (2011). Connemara & Mayo - A Walking Guide: Mountain, Coastal & Island Walks. Collins Press. ISBN 978-1848891029.
- Dillion, Paddy (2001). Connemara: Collins Rambler's guide. Harper Collins. ISBN 978-0002201216.
- Dillion, Paddy (1993). The Mountains of Ireland: A Guide to Walking the Summits. Cicerone. ISBN 978-1852841102.

== See also ==
- Twelve Bens
- Mweelrea, major range in Killary Harbour
- Maumturks, major range in Connemara
- List of Irish counties by highest point
- Lists of mountains in Ireland
- List of Marilyns in the British Isles
