= Ballynahinch (barony) =

Ballynahinch Baile na hInse
- Barony
- Location in Ireland
- Coordinates: 53°27′48″N 9°54′10″W
- Country: Ireland
- Province: Connacht
- County: Galway

Area
  - Total: 800.4 km^{2} (309.0 sq mi)
- Time zone: UTC+0 (WET)
  - Summer (DST): UTC+1 (IST (WEST))

Ballynahinch (Irish: Baile na hInse) is a barony in west County Galway, Ireland. It sits on the Atlantic coast to the west. The village of Ballynahinch is named after the barony.

== Geography ==
Ballynahinch has an area of 800.4 acres (3.239 km^{2}).

The barony contains several large bodies of water, including Derryclare Lough, Glendallach Lough, Kylemore Lough and Lough Fee.

Several significant roads pass through the barony including the N59 and several regional roads, R341, R344.

The Connemara National Park is also situated wholly within the barony.

== Civil parishes ==
The barony contains five civil parishes: Ballindoon, Ballynakill, Inishbofin, Moyrus and Omey

== Places of interest ==
- Connemara National Park
