= Tully Mountain (disambiguation) =

Tully Mountain or Mount Tully may refer to:

- Tully Mountain, a mountain in Massachusetts, United States
- Tully Mountain (Ireland), a mountain in County Galway
- Mount Tully, Queensland, a locality in Queensland, Australia
