= Cregg =

Cregg is a surname of Scottish origin (https://surnamedb.com/Surname/cregg & https://www.houseofnames.com/uk/cregg-family-crest). People with this surname include:

- C. J. Cregg, a fictional character in TV series The West Wing
- Cathal Cregg, Irish Gaelic footballer
- Huey Lewis, American musician (birth name Hugh Anthony Cregg III)
- James Cregg, American football coach
- Patrick Cregg, Irish footballer

== See also ==
- Cregg, County Londonderry, a townland in County Londonderry, Northern Ireland
- Cregg River, a river in County Galway, Ireland
  - Cregg Mill, County Galway, a mill on the Cregg River
- Creggs, a small village in County Galway
- Lindborg-Cregg Field, a baseball stadium in Montana, USA
- North Cregg, Irish traditional music band
