= Lough Fee =

Lake in County Galway, Ireland

- Loch Fí (Irish)
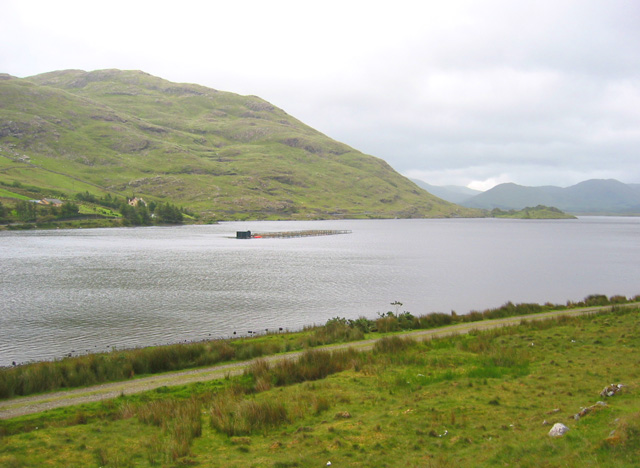

- Location in Ireland
- Location: County Galway
- Coordinates: 53°35′5″N 9°49′19″W
- Primary inflows: Tooreenacoona River
- Primary outflows: Lough Muck
- Catchment area: 15.76 km^{2} (6.1 sq mi)
- Basin countries: Ireland
- Max. length: 3.4 km (2.1 mi)
- Max. width: 0.6 km (0.4 mi)
- Surface area: 1.74 km^{2} (0.67 sq mi)
- Surface elevation: 47 m (154 ft)

Lough Fee (Irish: Loch Fí) is a freshwater lake in the west of Ireland. It is located in the Connemara area of County Galway.

== Geography ==
Lough Fee measures about 3 km (1.9 mi) long and 0.5 km (0.3 mi) wide. It is located about 30 km (19 mi) northeast of Clifden and just south of Killary Harbour.

== Hydrology ==
The Tooreenacoona River enters Lough Fee at its southwestern shore. Lough Fee flows out to the northwest to Lough Muck, which in turn flows to the Atlantic Ocean via the Culfin River.

== Natural history ==
Fish species in Lough Fee include salmon and brown trout. Lough Fee is part of The Twelve Bens/Garraun Complex Special Area of Conservation.

== See also ==
- List of loughs in Ireland
