= Toombeola =

Toombeola Tuaim Beola (Irish)
- Townland
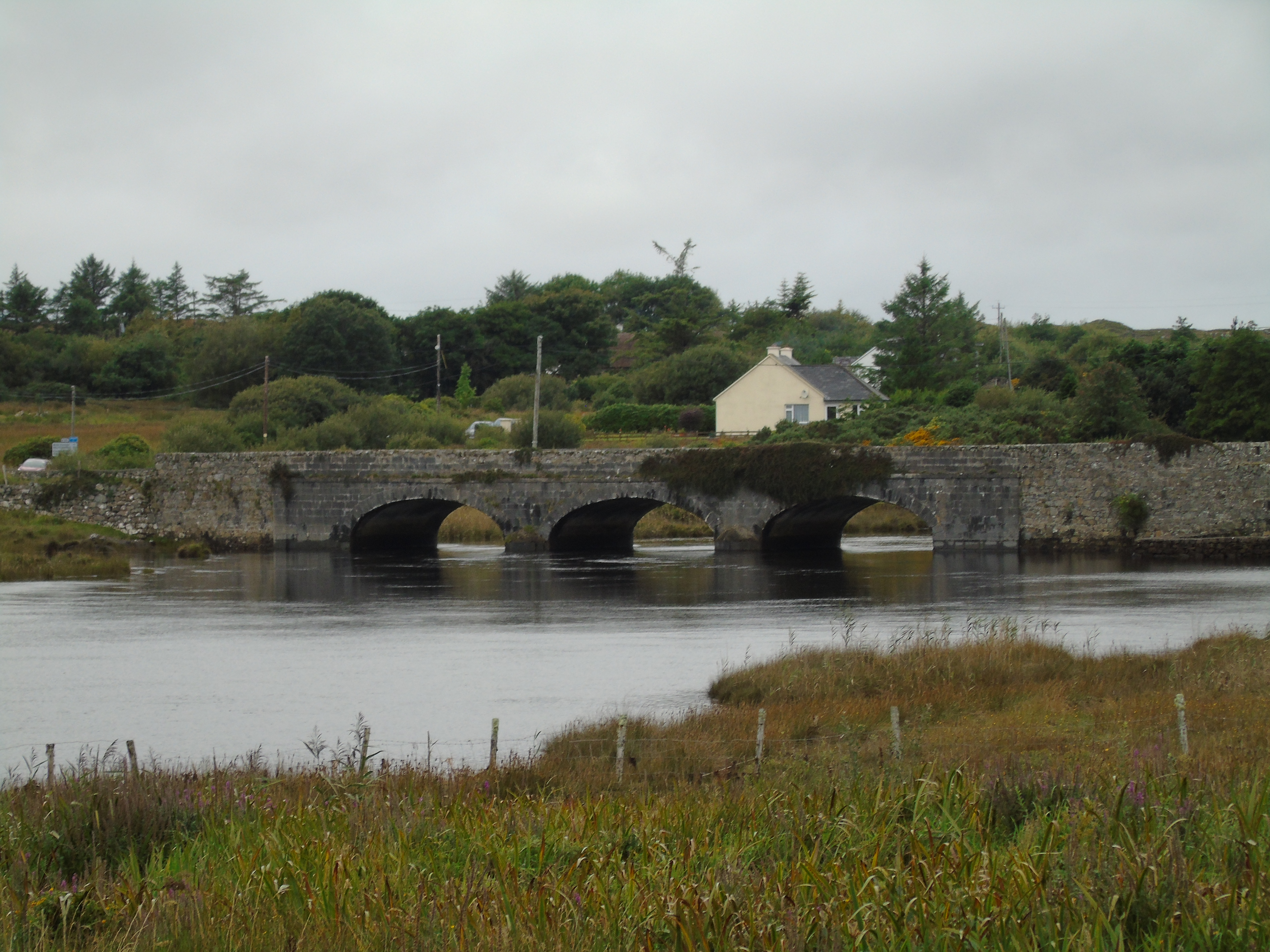
- Toombeola bridge

- Location in Ireland
- Coordinates: 53°26′N 9°52′W
- Country: Ireland
- Province: Connacht
- County: Galway
- Irish grid reference: L756444

Toombeola (Irish: Tuaim Beola) is a townland in the historical barony of Ballynahinch in Connemara, County Galway, Ireland. It is located near the Atlantic Coast, 44 miles (71 km) west of Galway City, 4 miles (6.4 km) east of Roundstone, and 10 miles (16 km) south east of Clifden. As of the 2011 census, Toombeola townland had a population of 18 people.

The area is also known locally as The Fishery, and the Owenmore River of the nearby fishery at Ballynahinch enters the sea at Toombeola Bridge. This bridge, built between 1828 and 1831, was completed as part of road improvements in the Connemara undertaken by the Scottish engineer Alexander Nimmo.

== History ==
The name Toombeola is an anglicisation of the Irish Tuaim Beola meaning 'tomb of Beola' or 'Beola's tumulus'. Beola was an ancient chieftain in the Connemara area.

A nearby Dominican abbey, St Patrick's, was founded in 1427. The abbey is now in ruins, although the surrounding cemetery remains in use. The abbey was built with the help of a local chieftain of the O'Flaherty (Ó Flaithbertaigh) clan, who ruled over the Connemara region until the time of King James II of England. The abbey was deserted by the Dominican Order between 1558 and 1559 following an attack by soldiers of the English crown. According to local folklore, one of the last Dominican brothers to serve at the abbey, Fr. John Tully, swam across the Owenmore River in an effort to escape the attack, but was shot and killed by soldiers on the other side. Locals buried him close to the site of his death, although no traces of a grave remain. Stones from the abbey were reputedly used by a local chieftain, Tadgh na Buile O'Flaherty, to build a castle on a small island on Ballynahinch Lake. A dispute over the ownership of this castle led to a feud between Tadgh na Buile O'Flaherty and his cousin Teige Ó Flaithbheartaigh.
