= North Cregg =

Irish traditional band

- Origin: Cork, Ireland
- Genres: Irish folk music, Celtic music
- Years active: 1996–present
- Labels: Greentrax, Magnetic
- Members: Christy Leahy; Liam Flannigan; Ciaran Coughlan; Martin Leahy; Claire-Anne Lynch
- Past members: John Neville; Fiona Kelleher
- Website: northcregg.com

North Cregg are an Irish traditional band from Cork. They formed in 1996 from Cork's pub session scene.

The band's name comes from a tune composed by uilleann piper Jimmy Morrison, who named his composition after a small town near Fermoy, County Cork.

As of 2010, North Cregg consists of Christy Leahy (button box), Liam Flannigan (fiddle, banjo), Ciaran Coughlan (piano), Martin Leahy (guitar, drums), and vocalist Claire-Anne Lynch, who also plays fiddle.

The band were voted "Best Traditional Newcomers" at the Irish Music Magazine Millennium Awards in 2000, and by 2008, they had played at Glastonbury and folk festivals including Irish Fest (Milwaukee), Tønder Festival (Denmark), and Celtic Connections (Glasgow).

As of 2026, the group has released four studio albums. The latest, titled The Roseland Barndance, came out in February 2007 and included guest appearances by Dirk Powell (clawhammer banjo), Chris McCarthy (double bass), and Seamus Burns (spoons).

== Band members ==
Current

- Christy Leahy – button box
- Liam Flannigan – fiddle, banjo
- Ciaran Coughlan – piano
- Martin Leahy – guitar, drums
- Claire-Anne Lynch – vocals, fiddle

Past

- John Neville
- Fiona Kelleher

== Discography ==
- ... and they danced all night (1999)
- mi.da:za (2001)
- Summer at My Feet (2003)
- The Roseland Barndance (2007)
