= Tully Mountain (Ireland) =

Mountain in Ireland

- Cnoc Leitreach
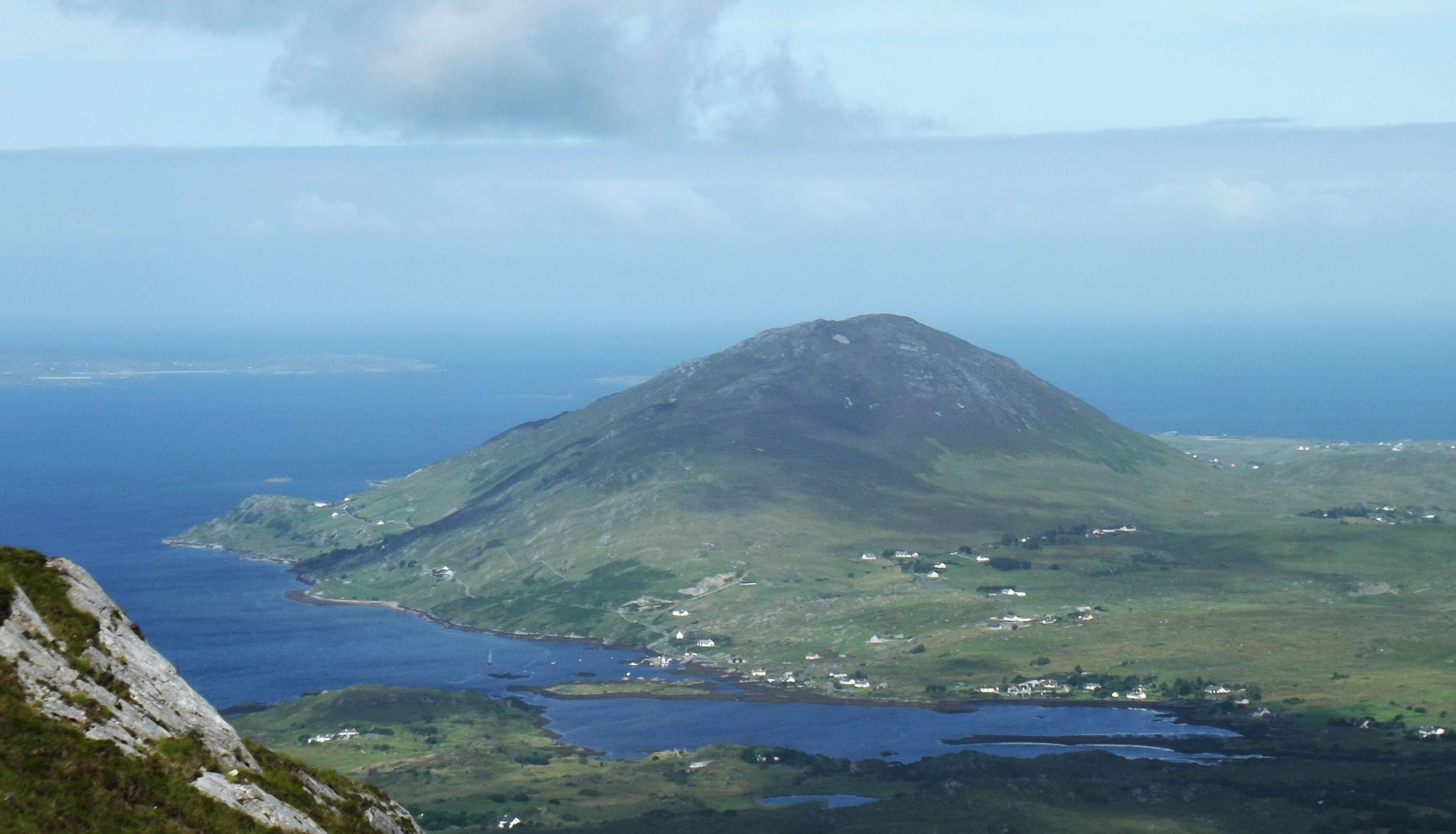

Highest point
- Elevation: 356 m (1,168 ft)
- Prominence: 331 m (1,086 ft)
- Isolation: 6.81 km (4.23 mi)
- Listing: Marilyn
- Coordinates: 53°35′01.64″N 10°00′17.63″W

Geography
- Location within Ireland
- Location: County Galway, Ireland
- OSI/OSNI grid: L6727261173

Climbing
- Easiest route: Hike

Letter Hill (Irish: Cnoc Leitreach) is a large hill near the coast to the north-west of Letterfrack in County Galway, Ireland. It is 356 m (1,168 ft) high and been listed as a Special Area of Conservation.

== Geography ==
The 356-metre (1,168 ft) high hill is visually striking, as it stands in a prominent position on the Renvyle Peninsula between Ballinakill harbour (south), Inishbofin (west) and the Crump Island (north). The summit hosts a small cairn and offers a panoramic view of the Twelve Bens, the north Connemara and Mayo coastlines, Inishbofin and other islands. Tully Mountain, as well as Tully Lough, takes its name from Tully village, located on the north-eastern side of the mountain. The walk which leads to the summit does not require any special hiking ability.

== Ecology ==
The mountain is composed of Dalradian schists and gneisses. The main features are rocky outcrops and upland grassland, with alpine and subalpine heaths. The lower slopes have been overgrazed by sheep and there are dense patches of bracken. The dry heath above 300 m (1,000 ft) supports juniper and bearberry with heather, bell heather, St. Dabeoc’s Heath and cross-leaved heath, and lichens and mosses, an unusual combination in the west of Ireland. There are some flattish wet grassland with soft rush, bog mosses (Sphagnum) and plants such as bladderwort, and some wet flushes, with sedges, bog mosses, bog pimpernel and sundews.

== Archaeology ==
The area around Tully Mountain is rich in pre-historic remains like a court tomb and a stone alignment between the mountain itself and Tully Lough.

== Conservation ==
Tully Lough and the NE slopes of the mountain have been designated as a candidate Special Area of Conservation under the EU Habitats Directive. Tully Mountain has been listed as a Special Area of Conservation.

== See also ==
- List of Marilyns in Ireland
- List of Special Areas of Conservation in the Republic of Ireland
