= Kylemore Lough =

Freshwater lake in County Galway, Ireland

- Loch na Coille Móire (Irish)
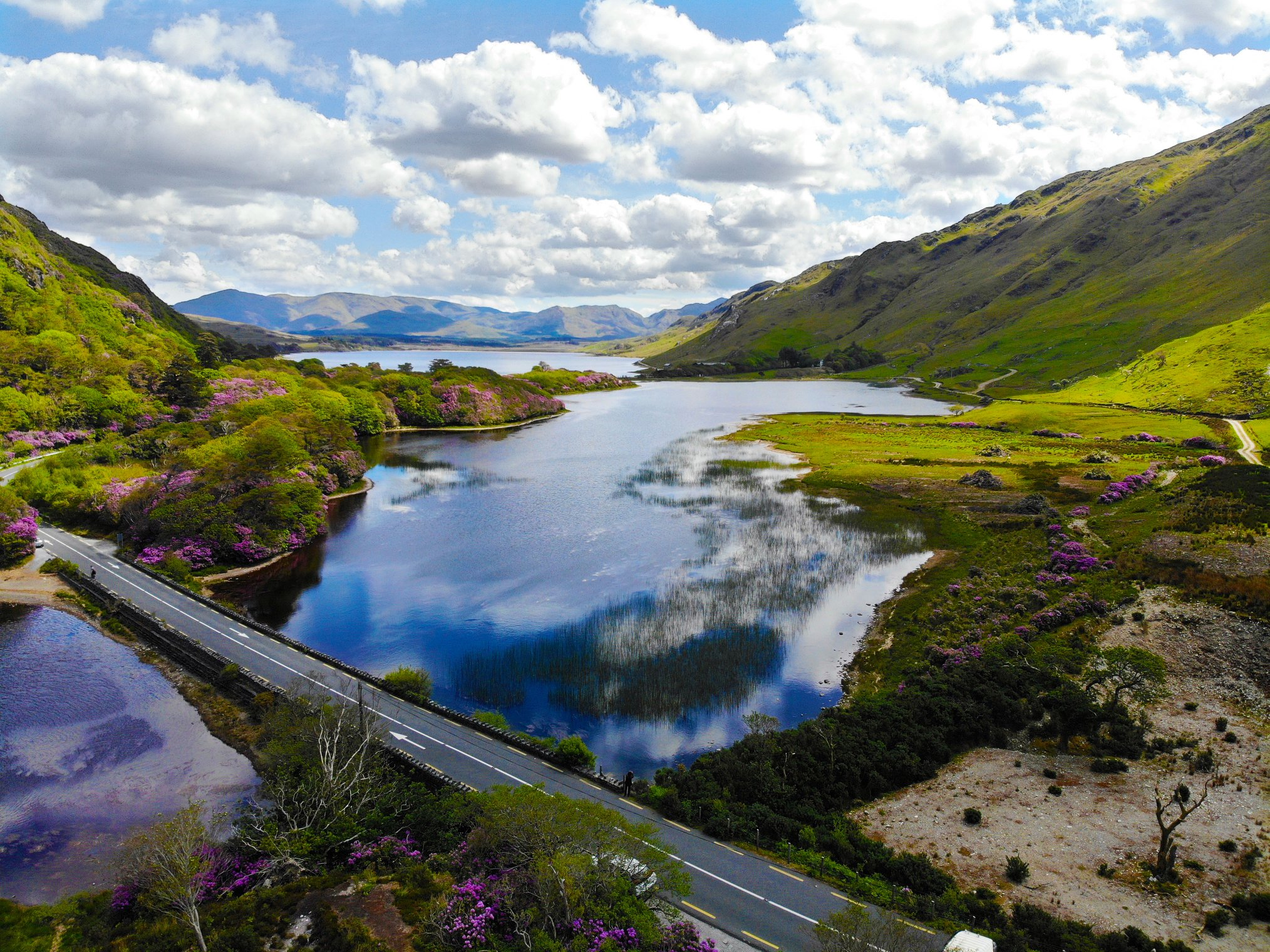
- Kylemore Lough in background, Pollacappul Lough in foreground

- Location in Ireland
- Location: County Galway
- Coordinates: 53°33′37″N 9°51′16″W
- Primary inflows: Kylemore River
- Catchment area: 20.91 km^{2} (8.1 sq mi)
- Basin countries: Ireland
- Max. length: 2.4 km (1.5 mi)
- Max. width: 0.7 km (0.4 mi)
- Surface area: 1.32 km^{2} (0.51 sq mi)
- Surface elevation: 35 m (115 ft)

Kylemore Lough (Irish: Loch na Coille Móire) is a freshwater lake in the west of Ireland. It is located in the Connemara area of County Galway.

== Geography ==
Kylemore Lough measures about 2 km (1.2 mi) long and 1 km (0.6 mi) wide. It is located about 20 km (12 mi) northeast of Clifden, just east of Connemara National Park. Kylemore Abbey, a major area attraction, is located on the shore of neighbouring Pollacapall Lough.

== Natural history ==
Fish species in Kylemore Lough include salmon and brown trout. Kylemore Lough is part of The Twelve Bens/Garraun Complex Special Area of Conservation.

== See also ==
- List of loughs in Ireland
