= Connemara National Park =

National park in the west of Ireland

- Irish: Páirc Naisiúnta Chonamara
- IUCN category II (national park)
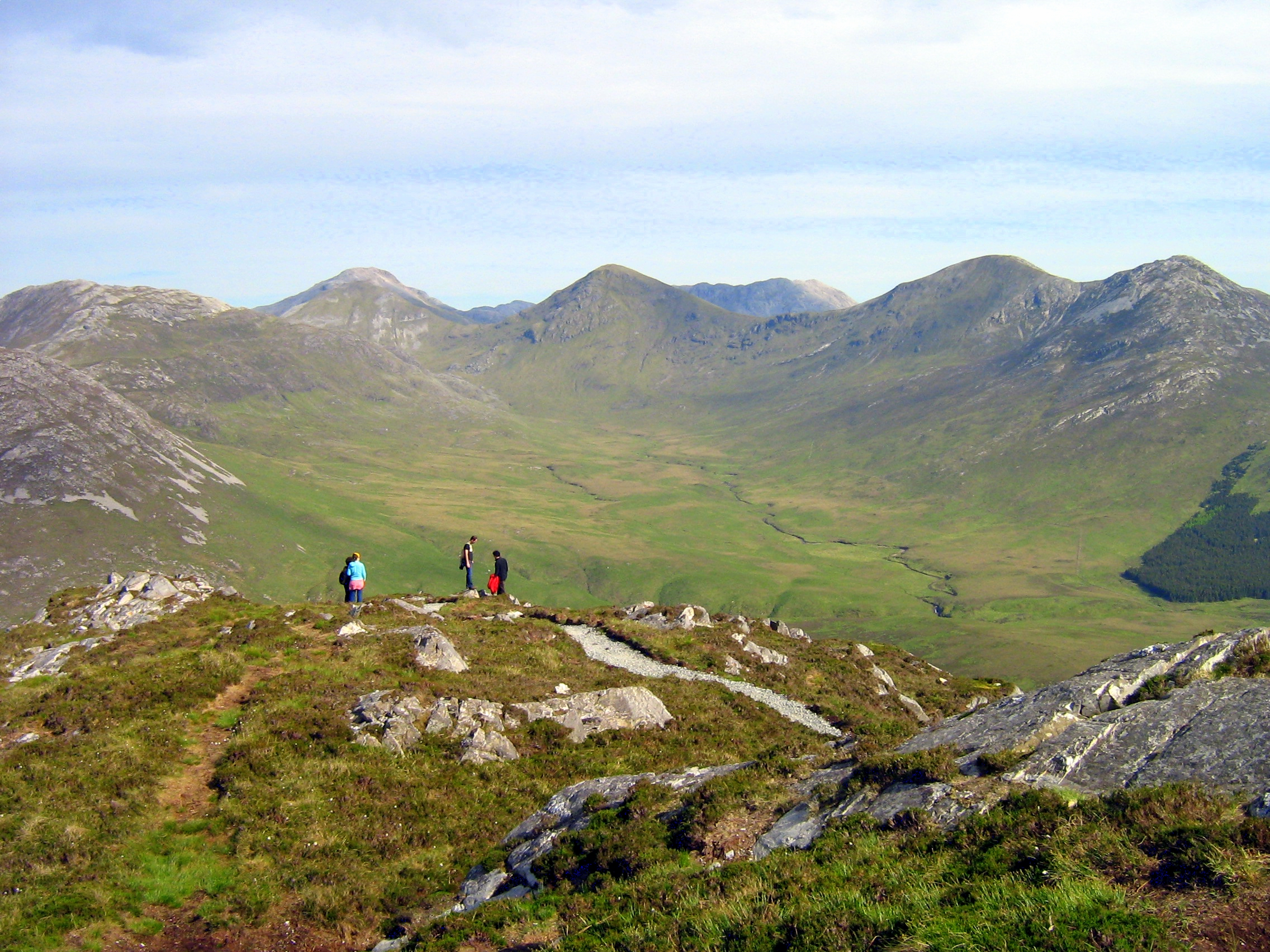
- View from Diamond Hill

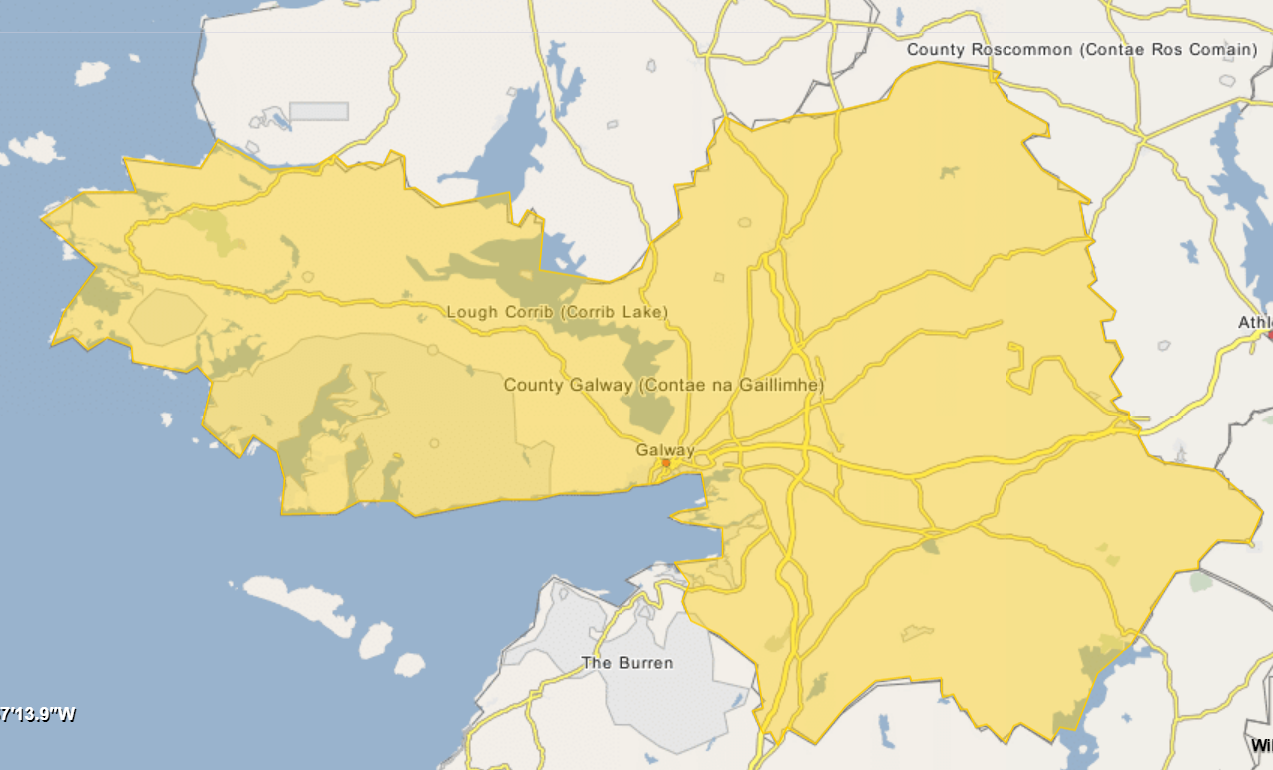
- Location within County Galway
- Location: Connemara
- Nearest town: Letterfrack
- Coordinates: 53°31′52″N 9°52′49″W
- Area: 2,000 ha (7.7 sq mi)
- Max. elevation: 729 metres (2,392 ft) (Benbaun)
- Min. elevation: 25 metres (82 ft)
- Established: 1980
- Governing body: National Parks and Wildlife Service (Ireland)
- Website: www.nationalparks.ie/connemara/

Connemara National Park (Irish: Páirc Naisiúnta Chonamara) is one of eight national parks in Ireland, managed by the National Parks and Wildlife Service. It is located in the northwest of Connemara in County Galway, on the west coast.

== History ==
National Parks in Ireland

Connemara National Park was founded and opened to the public in 1980. It features 2,000 ha (4,900 acres) of mountains, bogs, heaths, grasslands and forests. The entrance is situated on the Clifden side of Letterfrack. There are many remnants of human habitation within the park. There is a 19th-century graveyard as well as 4,000-year-old megalithic court tombs. The land was once part of the Kylemore Abbey estate.

== Environment ==
=== Flora ===
Western blanket bog and heathland are the most common vegetation of Connemara National Park. The boglands are situated in wet low-lying environments whereas the blanket bog exists within the drier mountain atmosphere. Purple moorgrass is the most bountiful plant, creating colorful landscapes throughout the countryside. Carnivorous plants play an important role in the park's ecosystem, the most common being sundew and butterworts trap. Bogs hold very little nutrients so many plants obtain their energy from the digestion of insects. Other common plants include lousewort, bog cotton, milkwort, bog asphodel, orchids and bog myrtle, with a variety of lichens and mosses.

=== Fauna ===
Connemara National Park is noted for its diversity of bird life. Common song birds include meadow pipits, skylarks, European stonechats, common chaffinches, European robins and Eurasian wrens. Native birds of prey include the common kestrel and Eurasian sparrowhawk with the merlin and peregrine falcon being seen less frequently. Woodcock, common snipe, common starling, song thrush, mistle thrush, redwing, fieldfare and mountain goat migrate to Connemara during the winter.

Mammals are often difficult to find but are present nonetheless. Field mice are common in the woodlands. Badgers, foxes, pine martens, and bats may be observed at night. Other mammals seen in the national park include red deer, otters, hares, stoats, and pygmy shrews. Red deer, once common in the area but extirpated about 150 years ago, were recently reintroduced to the park. Now the largest mammal in the park is the Connemara pony.

== See also ==
- List of tourist attractions in Ireland
- List of national parks of the Republic of Ireland
- Connemara
- Kylemore Abbey
- Twelve Bens
- Clifden
- Letterfrack
