= Kylemore Abbey =

Benedictine monastery in Connemara, Ireland

- Mainistir na Coille Móire
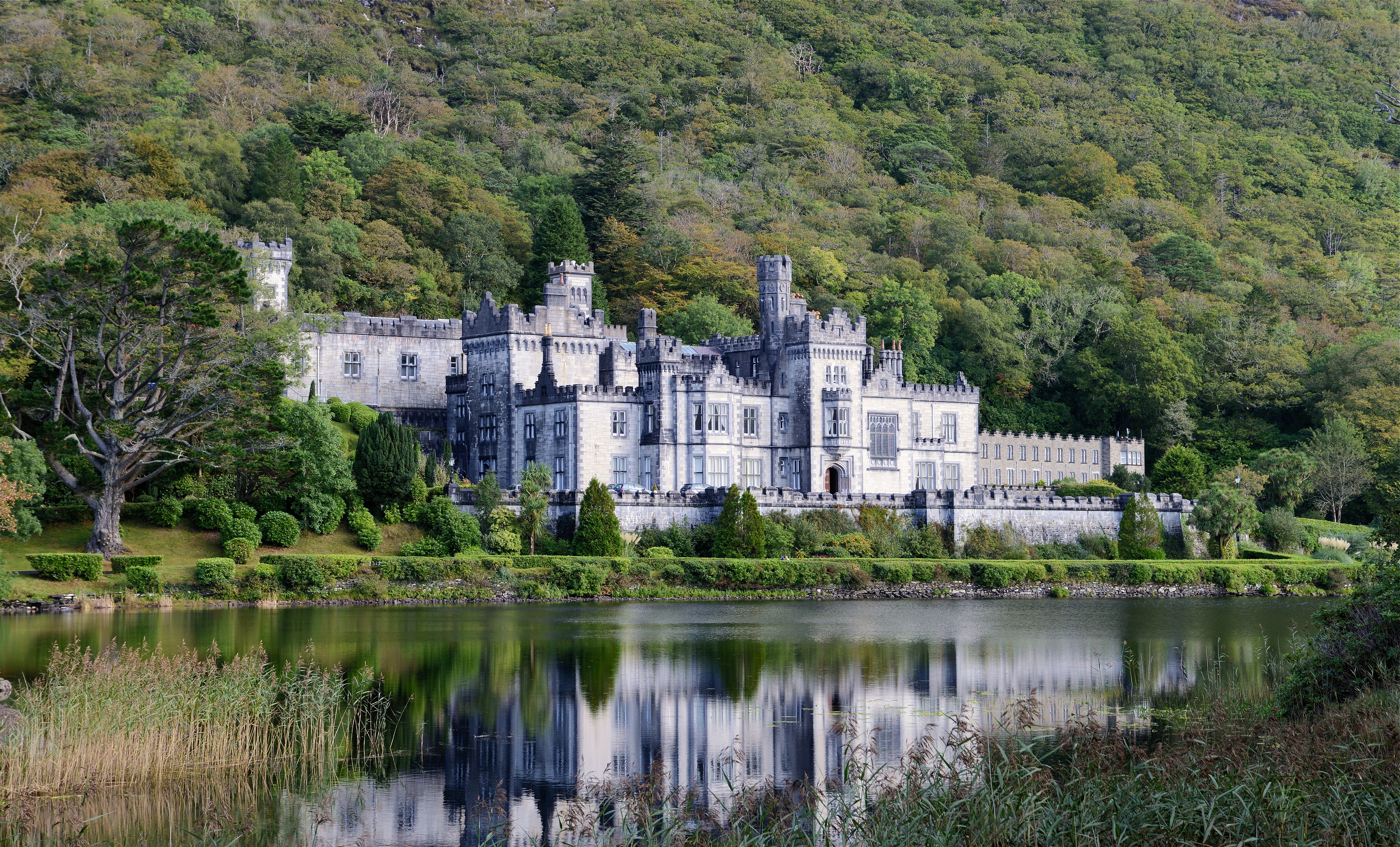
- Kylemore Abbey with Doughruagh behind

- Location within Ireland
- Interactive map of Kylemore Abbey

Monastery information
- Order: Benedictines
- Established: 1920
- Diocese: Galway, Kilmacduagh and Kilfenora

People
- Founders: Benedictine nuns from Ypres, Belgium

Architecture
- Status: Active
- Style: Victorian

Site
- Location: Connemara, County Galway, Ireland
- Coordinates: 53°33′42″N 9°53′22″W
- Public access: Yes
- Website: kylemoreabbey.com

Kylemore Abbey (Irish: Mainistir na Coille Móire) is a Benedictine Monastery founded in 1920 on the grounds of Kylemore Castle, in Connemara, County Galway, Ireland. The Abbey was founded for Benedictine nuns who fled Belgium in the First World War. Since 2022, it has belonged to the English Benedictine Congregation. Under The Kylemore Trust, it continues its mission as a Benedictine monastery, holding Kylemore and its spiritual mission, natural and built heritage in trust for the Irish nation. Kylemore Abbey also operates as one of Ireland's leading visitor attractions.

== History ==
=== Kylemore Lodge ===
Kylemore Castle was built in 1868 as a private home for the family of Mitchell Henry, a wealthy doctor from London whose family was involved in textile manufacturing in Manchester, England. He moved to Ireland when he and his wife Margaret purchased the land around the Abbey, after having travelled there on their honeymoon in the mid-1840s. He became a politician, becoming an MP for County Galway from 1871 to 1885.

=== Kylemore Castle ===
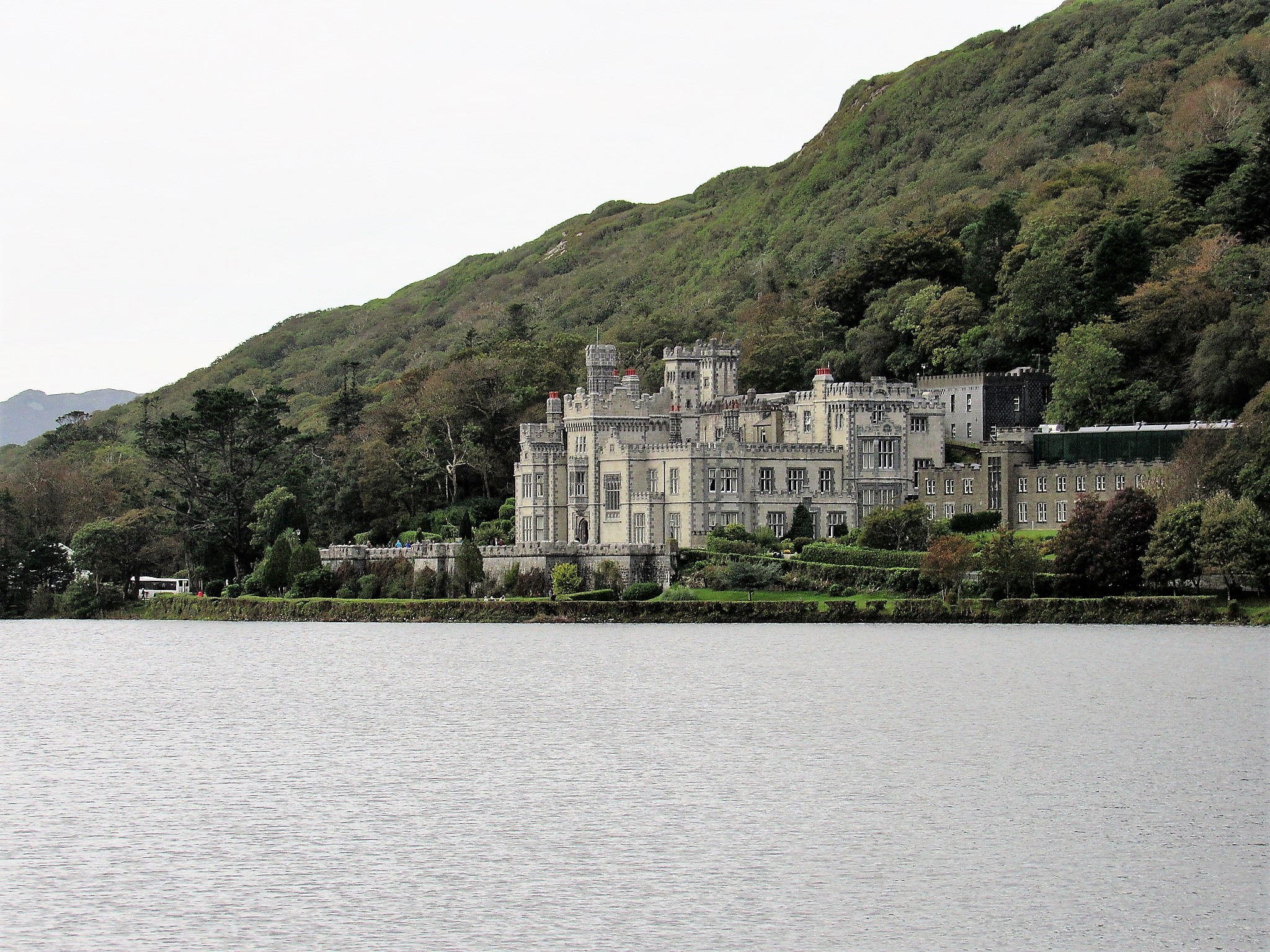
The Abbey, formerly Kylemore Castle

The castle was designed by James Franklin Fuller, aided by Samuel Ussher Roberts. The construction of the castle began in 1867, and took the total of one hundred men and four years to complete. The castle covered approximately 40,000 square feet (3,700 m^{2}) and had over seventy rooms with a principal wall that was two to three feet thick. The facade measures 142 feet (43 m) in width and is made of granite brought from Dalkey quarry by sea to Letterfrack, and of limestone brought from Ballinasloe. There were 33 bedrooms, 4 bathrooms, 4 sitting rooms, a ballroom, billiard room, library, study, school room, smoking room, gun room and various offices and domestic staff residences for the butler, cook, housekeeper and other servants.

Margaret died in 1874, having contracted a fever on a visit to Egypt. Henry spent less time at Kylemore after her death, but built a Gothic chapel and family mausoleum as a memorial. The mausoleum holds the bodies of Margaret Henry, Mitchell Henry and a great-grandnephew.

The Abbey remained in Henry's estate after he returned to England. The castle was sold to the Duke and Duchess of Manchester in 1903, who resided there for several years before being forced to sell the house and grounds because of gambling debts.

=== Benedictine Abbey ===
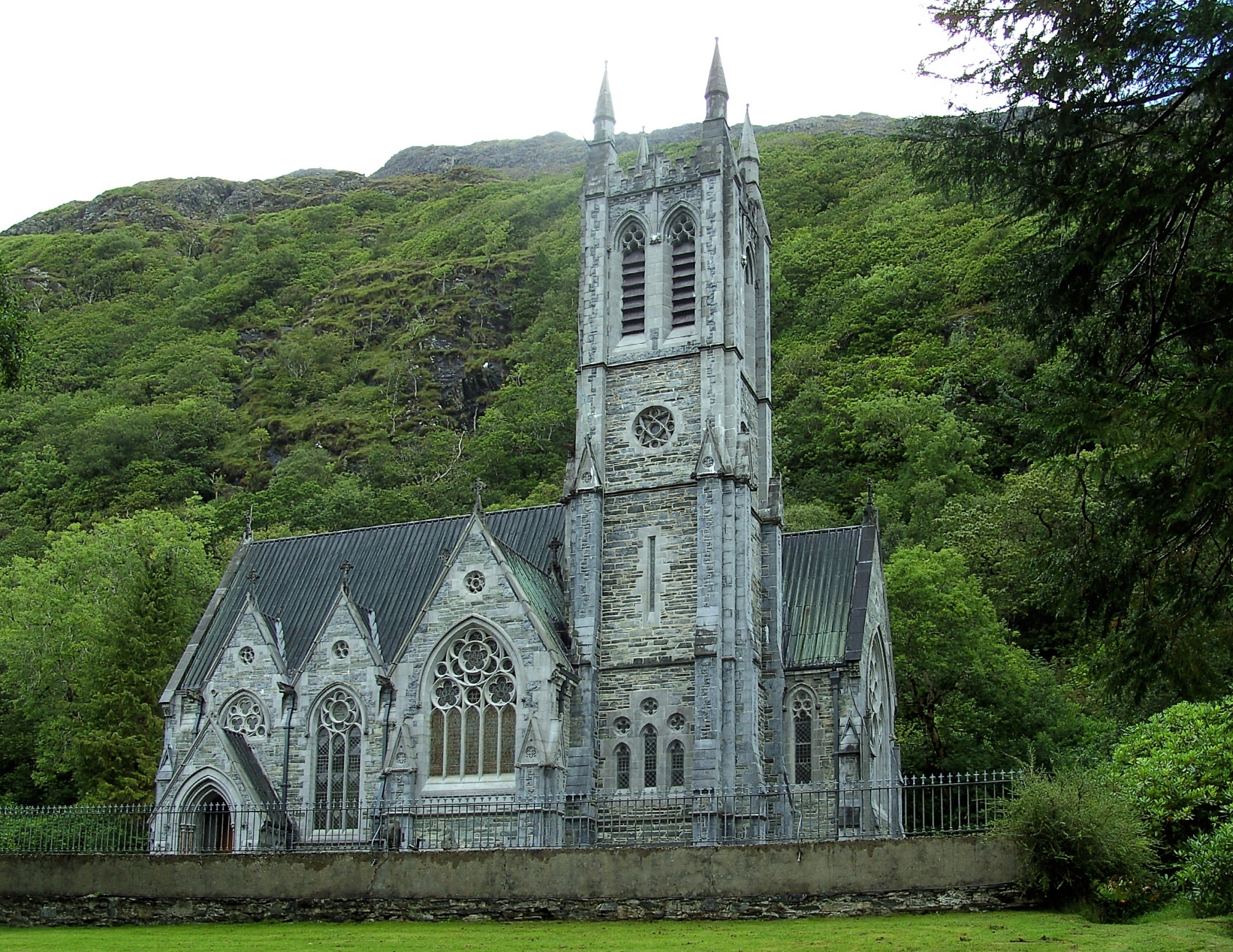
Neo-Gothic church at Kylemore Abbey

The community traces its roots to a Benedictine house in Brussels, founded by Lady Mary Percy in 1598. From Brussels a house was founded in Ghent; and from Ghent in Ypres. Ypres Abbey attracted the daughters of Irish nobility, as students and postulants. In 1920, the Irish Benedictine Nuns purchased the Abbey castle and lands after they were forced to flee Ypres during World War I. The nuns, who had been based in Ypres for several hundred years, had been bombed out of their Abbey during World War I. They were rescued by men of the 8th Battalion of the Royal Munster Fusiliers, a scene that was later reproduced in the Freeman's Journal. After they left Ypres they were evacuated to England where they remained until 1920.

The nuns ran a farm on the estate where they raised livestock and vegetables. The Abbey is an important employer in the area.

The nuns continued to offer education to girls, opening a boarding school in 1923 and establishing a day school for girls from the locality. The school was the main educational establishment for most girls from Renvyle, Letterfrack and further afield for almost a century but it was forced to close in 2010. The nuns have since been developing new education and retreat activities.

At the General Chapter held in July 2022 at the Buckfast Abbey, the Kylemore Abbey was accepted to the English Benedictine Congregation along with two other new communities of nuns: Mariavall Abbey from Sweden and Jamberoo Abbey from Australia.

On 25 September 2024, Mother Karol O'Connell OSB was elected the twentieth Abbess of the Abbey. She immediately began her twelve-year term as leader of the Benedictine community, and received her abbatial blessing on 5 November 2024.

== University of Notre Dame – Kylemore Abbey Global Centre ==
Since 2015, the Abbey has a partnership with the University of Notre Dame of the US. The abbey hosts academic programmes for Notre Dame students, and the university renovated spaces in the abbey. The programmes started in 2016 with about 100 students moving to Kylemore; a dedication ceremony was attended by Fr. Timothy Scully, Justice Peter Kelly (President of the High Court of Ireland) and Mother Abbess Máire Hickey OSB of Kylemore, as well as the US and Canadian ambassadors. Notre Dame class offerings at the Abbey include some of its executive business programmes, such as the Inspirational Leadership, and creative residencies and courses. The art en plein air class and flute master class by Sir James Galway were also hosted in Kylemore.

The Kylemore Abbey Biodiversity Stewardship Programme commenced in 2021 in partnership with the School of Natural Sciences, University of Galway, to document and allow students to research the biodiversity of the Kylemore estate.

== Gardens ==
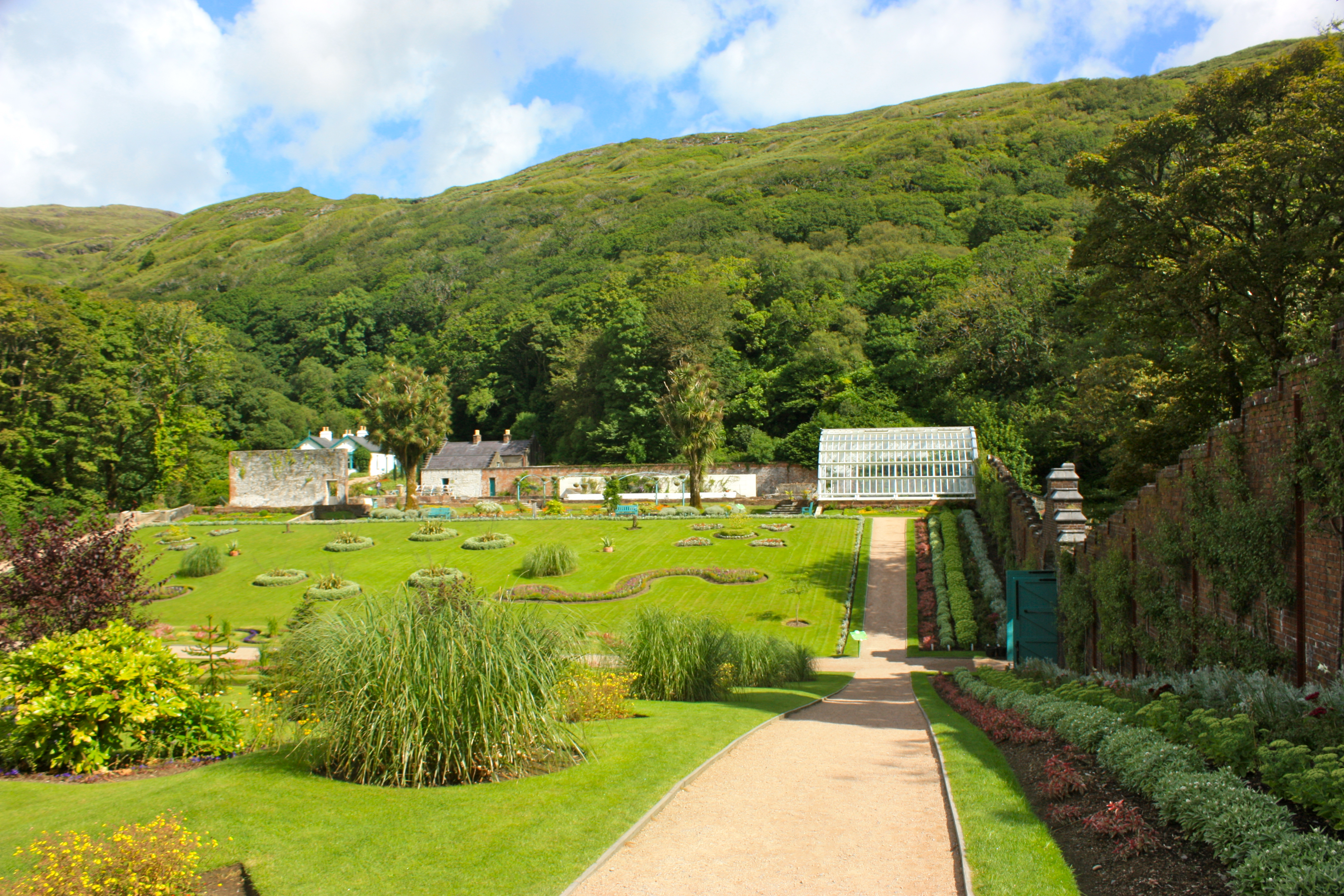
Walled Victorian Gardens, Kylemore Abbey

The Estate includes large walled Victorian Gardens. Since the 1970s these have been open for public tours and nature walks. The Benedictine community has restored the Abbey's gardens and church with donations and local artisans in order to be a self-sustaining estate. The gardens include a Kitchen Garden and a flower garden, the original walled garden was laid out by head gardener James Garnier in 1870. A complete restoration commenced in 1995.

== In the media ==
Kylemore Abbey was featured in the UK cooking show Two Fat Ladies, Series 3 Episode 1 "Benedictine Nuns" (1998). The host cooks, Jennifer Paterson & Clarissa Dickson-Wright, cooked dinner for the Benedictine nuns that live, work and worship at the abbey. Kylemore Abbey and the nuns featured on RTE's Nationwide TV programme in 2020, to celebrate 100 years of the Benedictine order at the abbey. Kylemore also featured in Heaven Made, which follows nuns and monks making traditional gifts for Christmas.

== See also ==
- List of abbeys and priories in Ireland (County Galway)
- List of tourist attractions in Ireland
