= Corcogemore =

Mountain in County Galway, Ireland

- Corcóg
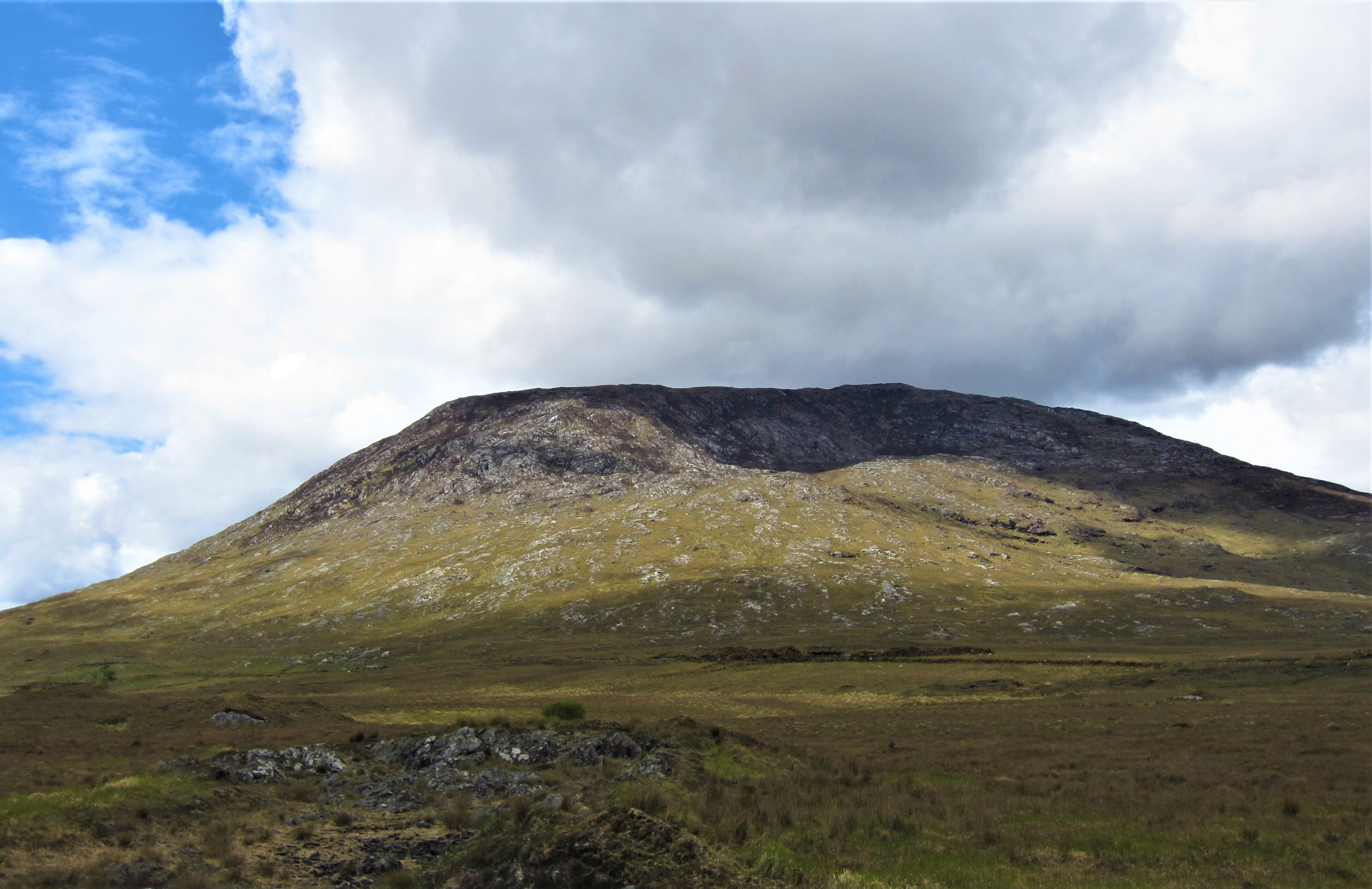
- Corcogemore from the R336 road

Highest point
- Elevation: 609 m (1,998 ft)
- Prominence: 221 m (725 ft)
- Listing: Marilyn, Hewitt, Arderin, Simm, Vandeleur-Lynam
- Coordinates: 53°28′56″N 9°34′43″W

Naming
- English translation: cone or beehive
- Language of name: Irish

Geography
- Location within island of Ireland
- Location: County Galway, Ireland
- Parent range: Maumturks
- OSI/OSNI grid: L9526049144
- Topo map: OSi Discovery 45

Geology
- Rock type(s): Pale quartzites, grits, graphitic top bedrock

Climbing
- Easiest route: via R336 at Maam Cross

Corcogemore (Irish: Corcóg, meaning 'Cone or Beehive') at 609 metres (1,998 ft), is the 208th–highest peak in Ireland on the Arderin scale, and the 253rd–highest peak on the Vandeleur-Lynam scale. Corcogemore is located on a small massif that includes Binn Mhór (661 metres (2,169 ft)), and Mullach Glas (622 metres (2,041 ft)); this massif is situated at the far southeastern sector of the long north-west to south-east central spine of the Maumturks mountain range in the Connemara National Park in County Galway, Ireland. Corcogemore is the 8th-highest peak in the Maumturks range, and the most southerly in the range; after Lackavrea, Corcogemore is the 2nd-most easterly Maumturk.

== Naming ==
Irish: Corcóg is the Irish name for a "beehive", although it can also mean cone (the shape of a traditional beehive).

Cartographer Tim Robinson noted that "the Ordnance Survey has been incorrectly calling this mountain 'Leckavrea' for a hundred and fifty years", with Leckavrea (Irish: Leic Aimhréidh) being a mountain to the east of Corcogemore.

== Geography ==
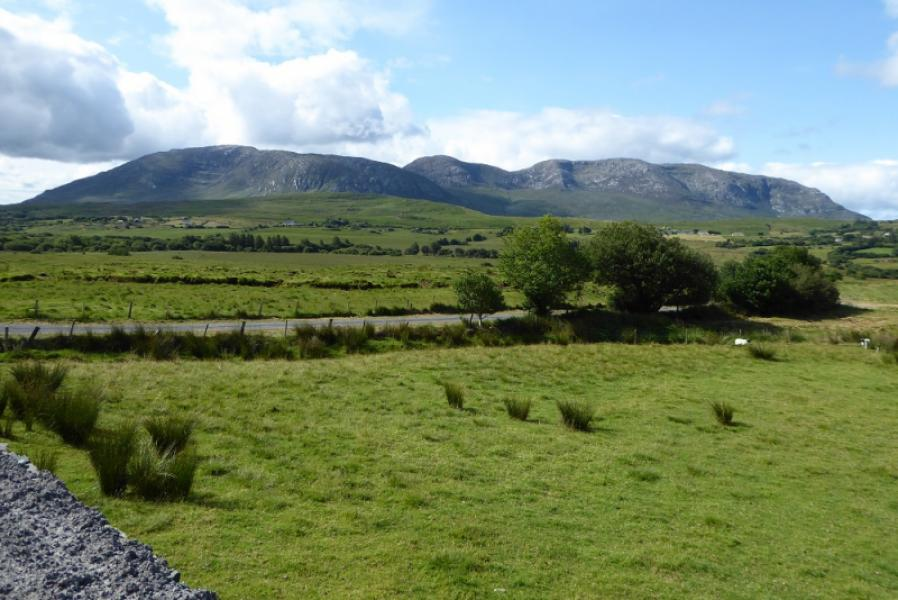
Corcogemore (l), Mullach Glas (c), and Binn Mhor (r) from the North

Corcogemore lies on a small massif in the southeast sector of the Maumturks range, which is separated from the main range by a deep east-west mountain pass called Máméan, a site of pilgrimage dedicated to Saint Patrick since the 5th-century.

To the west, along a high winding ridge across this massif is Mullach Glas 432 metres (1,417 ft), and then Binn Mhór 661 metres (2,169 ft).

To the east of Corcogemore, apart from the massif and across the R336 road, which runs through the pass of Irish: Mám Aodha, is the isolated Maumturk peak of Lackavrea 396 metres (1,299 ft).

== Hill walking ==
The most straightforward route to the summit Corcogemore is the 5-kilometre 2-3 hour roundtrip route from the R336 road, just after Maam Cross, and back; however, because of its positioning on a high ridge of its own small massif, it can also be climbed as an alternative 10-kilometre 4–5 hour route from Corcogemore in the west, across Mullach Glas, to the summit of Binn Mhór, and then finishing down at Máméan (i.e. the route requires two cars).

Corcogemore is also climbed as part of the Maamturks Challenge, a 25-kilometre 10–12 hour walk over the full Maumturks range (from Maam Cross to Leenaun), which is considered one of the "great classic ridge-walks of Ireland", but of "extreme grade" due to the circa 7,600 feet of total ascent. Since 1975, the University College Galway Mountaineering Club has run the annual "Maamturks Challenge Walk" (MCW), and mans a checkpoint on Corcogemore, which is the first major checkpoint on the Maumturks range.

== Bibliography ==
- Fairbairn, Helen (2014). Ireland's Best Walks: A Walking Guide. Collins Press. ISBN 978-1848892118.
- MountainViews Online Database (Simon Stewart) (2013). A Guide to Ireland's Mountain Summits: The Vandeleur-Lynams & the Arderins. Collins Books. ISBN 978-1-84889-164-7.
- Paul Phelan (2011). Connemara & Mayo - A Walking Guide: Mountain, Coastal & Island Walks. Collins Press. ISBN 978-1848891029.
- Dillion, Paddy (2001). Connemara: Collins Rambler's guide. Harper Collins. ISBN 978-0002201216.
- Dillion, Paddy (1993). The Mountains of Ireland: A Guide to Walking the Summits. Cicerone. ISBN 978-1852841102.

== See also ==
- Twelve Bens, major range in Connemara
- Mweelrea, major range in Killary Harbour
- Lists of mountains in Ireland
- Lists of mountains and hills in the British Isles
- List of Marilyns in the British Isles
- List of Hewitt mountains in England, Wales and Ireland
