= Mullach Glas =

Mountain in Galway, Ireland

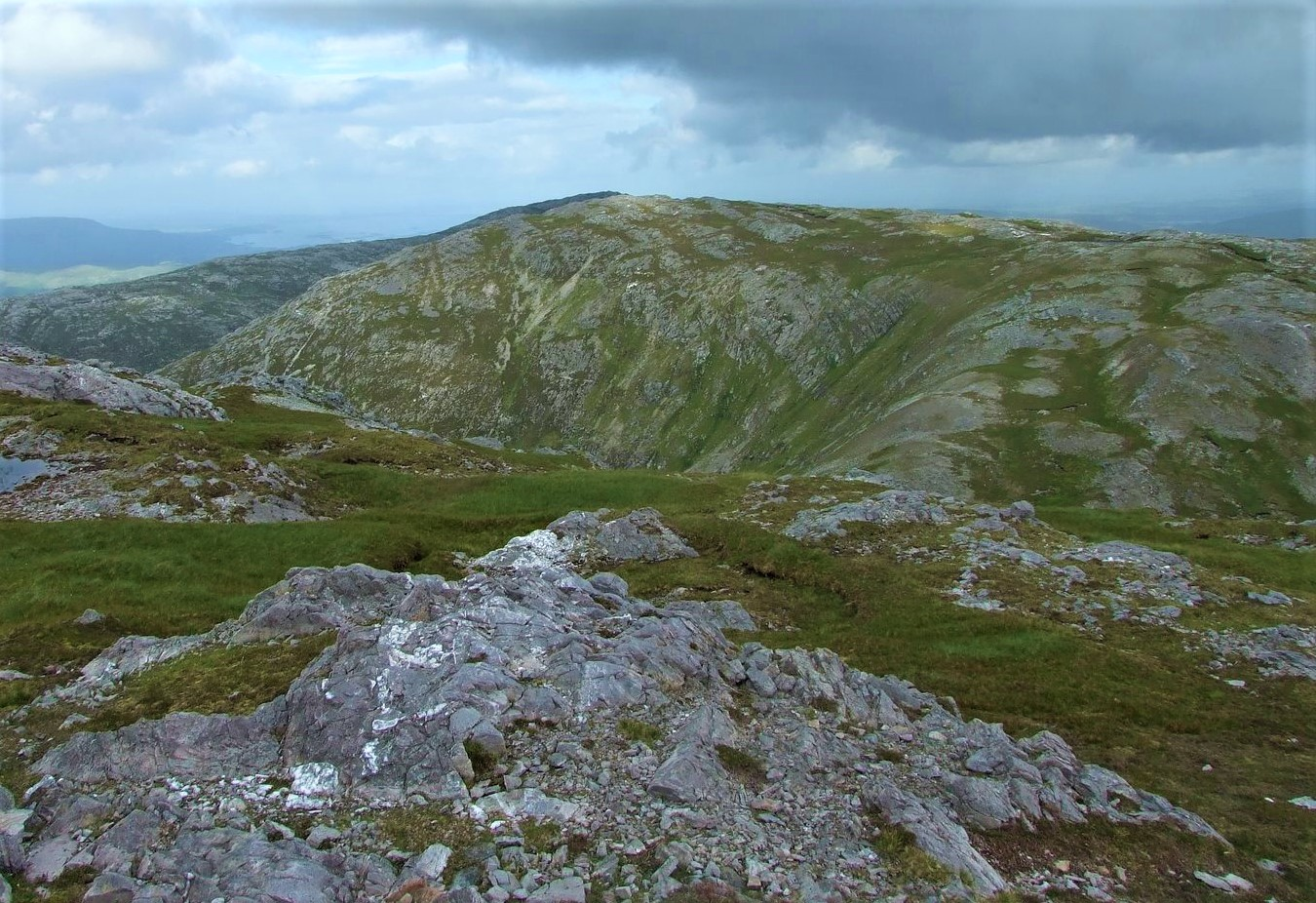
- Mullach Glas viewed from Binn Mhór

Highest point
- Elevation: 622 m (2,041 ft)
- Prominence: 87 m (285 ft)
- Listing: Hewitt, Arderin, Simm, Vandeleur-Lynam
- Coordinates: 53°28′57″N 9°36′04″W

Naming
- English translation: Grey/Green Summit
- Language of name: Irish

Geography
- Location within island of Ireland
- Location: County Galway, Ireland
- Parent range: Maumturks
- OSI/OSNI grid: L9374849241
- Topo map: OSi Discovery 45

Geology
- Rock type(s): Pale quartzites, grits, graphitic top bedrock

Mullach Glas (Irish for "grey/green summit") is one of the Maumturk Mountains of Connemara in County Galway, Ireland. At 622 metres (2,041 ft), it is the fifth-highest of the Maumturks, the 197th–highest peak in Ireland on the Arderin list, and 238th–highest on the Vandeleur-Lynam list. Mullach Glas is on a massif that includes Binn Mhór (661 metres (2,169 ft)) and Corcogemore (609 metres (1,998 ft)); this massif is at the far southeastern sector of the long north-west to south-east spine of the Maumturks.

== Name ==
Irish academic Paul Tempan records that Irish: Mullach Glas translates as "grey/green summit", and that the peak has also been called "Shannagirah".

== Geography ==
Mullach Glas lies on a small massif in the southeast sector of the Maumturks range, which is separated from the main range by a deep east–west mountain pass called Máméan, a site of pilgrimage dedicated to Saint Patrick since the 5th-century.

To the north east is the minor subsidiary peak of Mullach Glas NE Top (432 metres (1,417 ft)), also known as Cruiscín (probably meaning "jug"). To the west is Binn Mhór (661 metres (2,169 ft)), the 3rd-highest peak in the Maumturks range, while to the east is Corcogemore (609 metres (1,998 ft)).

== Hill walking ==
The most straightforward route to the summit Mullach Glas is the 10-kilometre 4–5 hour roundtrip route from the pass at Máméan and back; however, because of its positioning on a high ridge of its own small massif, it can also be climbed as an alternative 10-kilometre 4–5 hour route from Corcogemore in the west, across Mullach Glas, to the summit of Binn Mhór, and then finishing down at Máméan (i.e. the route requires two cars).

Mullach Glas is also climbed as part of the Maamturks Challenge, a 25-kilometre 10–12 hour walk over the full Maumturks range (from Maam Cross to Leenaun), which is considered one of the "great classic ridge-walks of Ireland", but of "extreme grade" due to the circa 7,600 feet of total ascent. Since 1975, the University College Galway Mountaineering Club has run the annual "Maamturks Challenge Walk" (MCW), and mans a checkpoint to the west of Mullach Glas in the Máméan pass, and to the east of Mullach Glas on the neighbouring peak of Corcogemore.

== Gallery ==
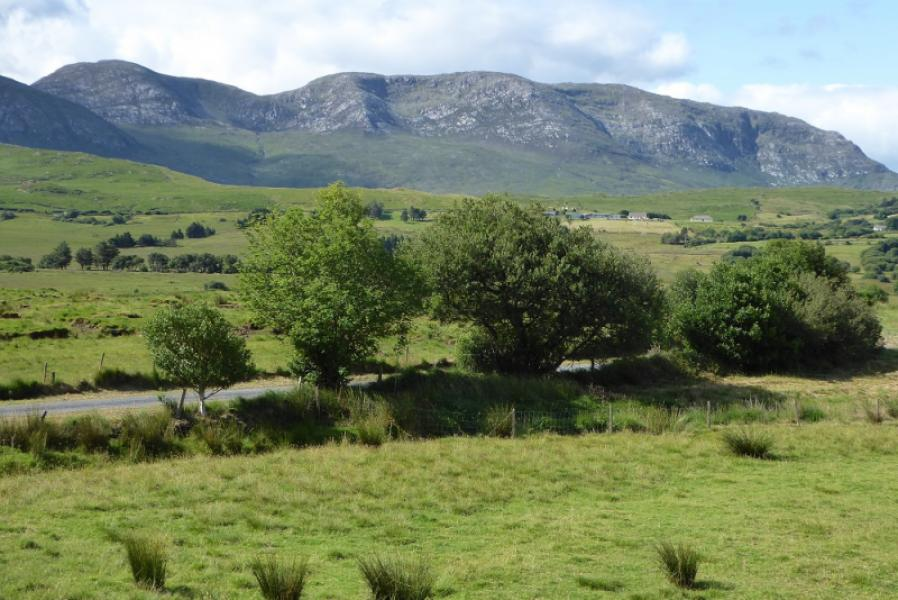
Mullach Glas (left), and Binn Mhór (centre and right), as viewed from the north

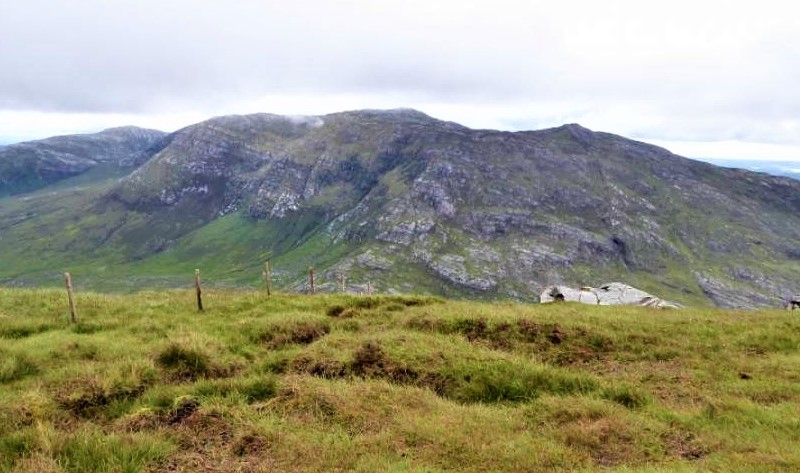
Mullach Glas (back left), and Binn Mhór (centre), viewed from Binn Chaonaigh

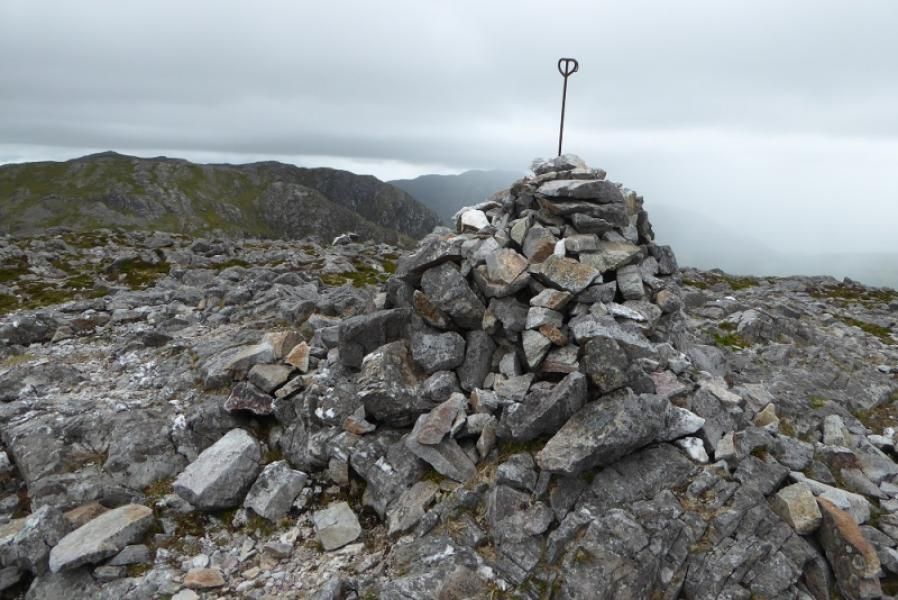
Summit of Mullach Glas, looking west to peak of Binn Mhór

== Bibliography ==
- MountainViews Online Database (Simon Stewart) (2013). A Guide to Ireland's Mountain Summits: The Vandeleur-Lynams & the Arderins. Collins Books. ISBN 978-1-84889-164-7.
- Paul Phelan (2011). Connemara & Mayo - A Walking Guide: Mountain, Coastal & Island Walks. Collins Press. ISBN 978-1848891029.
- Dillion, Paddy (2001). Connemara: Collins Rambler's guide. Harper Collins. ISBN 978-0002201216.
- Dillion, Paddy (1993). The Mountains of Ireland: A Guide to Walking the Summits. Cicerone. ISBN 978-1852841102.

== See also ==
- Twelve Bens, major range in Connemara
- Mweelrea, major range in Killary Harbour
- Lists of mountains in Ireland
- Lists of mountains and hills in the British Isles
- List of Hewitt mountains in England, Wales and Ireland
