= Lackavrea =

Mountain in County Galway, Ireland

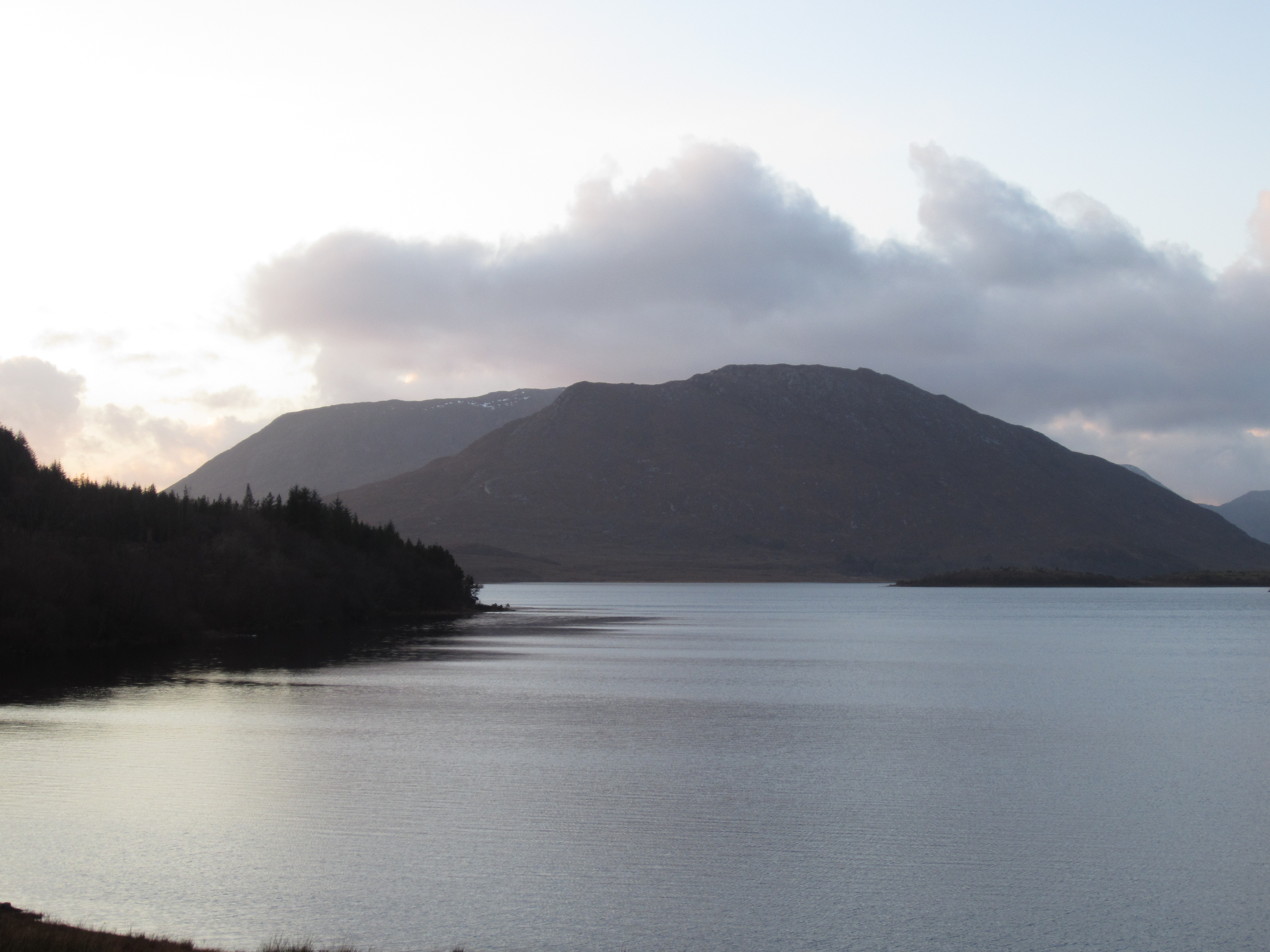
- Lackavrea from the east with Corcogemore, and the full Maumturks range behind it.

Highest point
- Elevation: 396 m (1,299 ft)
- Prominence: 301 m (988 ft)
- Listing: Marilyn
- Coordinates: 53°29′10″N 9°31′55″W

Naming
- Native name: Leic Aimhréidh (Irish)
- English translation: rugged rock-slab

Geography
- Location within island of Ireland
- Location: County Galway, Ireland
- Parent range: Maumturks
- OSI/OSNI grid: L983495
- Topo map: OSi Discovery 45

Geology
- Mountain type(s): Pale quartzites, grits, graphitic top

Lackavrea (Irish: Leic Aimhréidh; rugged rock-slab) is a 396-metre (1,299 ft) isolated mountain in County Galway, Ireland. It is located to the east of the larger Maumturks range, which lies within the Connemara region.

== See also ==
- Maumturks
- Twelve Bens
- List of mountains in Ireland
- List of Marilyns in the British Isles
