= Binn idir an dá Log =

Mountain in Galway, Ireland

Binn idir an Dá Log
- Benadolug
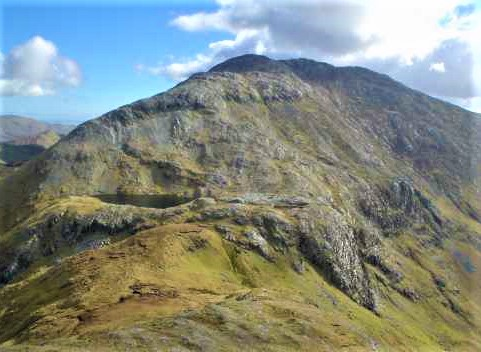
- Northwest face and corrie lake of Lough Maumahoge, as viewed from Knocknahillion

Highest point
- Elevation: 702 m (2,303 ft)
- Prominence: 644 m (2,113 ft)
- Listing: P600, 100 Highest Irish Mountains, Marilyn, Hewitt, Arderin, Simm, Vandeleur-Lynam
- Coordinates: 53°30′50″N 9°40′36″W

Naming
- English translation: peak between two hollows
- Language of name: Irish

Geography
- Location within island of Ireland
- Location: County Galway, Ireland
- Parent range: Maumturks
- OSI/OSNI grid: L8881952827
- Topo map: OSi Discovery 37

Geology
- Rock type(s): Pale quartzites, grits, graphitic top bedrock

Climbing
- Easiest route: Via pass of Maumahoge

Binn idir an Dá Log (Irish for "peak between the two hollows"), sometimes anglicized Benadolug, at 702 metres (2,303 ft), is the highest of the Maumturk Mountains in Connemara in County Galway, Ireland. It is at the middle of the long north-west to south-east central spine of the range. The summit is the 87th-highest peak in Ireland on the Arderin list, and the 108th-highest on the Vandeleur-Lynam list.

== Naming ==
Binn idir an Dá Log derives its name from the two glacial corries that bound each end of its high rocky summit ridge (the north-western corrie is a lake). The Placenames Database of Ireland records an anglicised version, 'Benadolug', but this does not appear in other noted Irish mountain placename reference guides.

The mountain has an unnamed southeastern peak. On its slopes is the townland of Barrslievenaroy (Irish: Barrshliabh na Ráthadh, meaning 'mountain-top of the fort'). Sometimes this name is mistakenly given to Binn idir an Dá Log.

== Geography ==
Binn idir an dá Log lies at the centre of the long north-west to south-east central spine of the Maumturks range in the Connemara National Park. The mountain has a high winding rocky summit ridge, littered in quartzite rocks and gravel, that includes the subsidiary peak of Binn idir an dá Log SE Top at 659 metres (2,162 ft). To the southeast of the summit ridge is a large corrie (and the townland of Barrslievenaroy below), and then the 4th highest Maumturk of Binn Chaonaigh at 633 metres (2,077 ft).

To the northwest of the summit ridge is an even larger corrie lake (at L 879536), with steep cliffs on its backwall, which then rises up again to the summit of Knocknahillion at 607 metres (1,991 ft). The col between Binn idir an dá Log and Knocknahillion is the pass of Maumahoge (Irish: Mhám Ochóige, and the corrie lake is called Lough Maumahoge (Irish: Loch Mhám Ochóige).

Binn idir an dá Log's prominence of 644 metres (2,113 ft) qualifies it as a P600, and a Marilyn, and it also ranks it as the 52nd-highest mountain in Ireland on the MountainViews Online Database, 100 Highest Irish Mountains, where the minimum prominence threshold is 100 metres.

== Hill walking ==
The easiest way summit Binn idir an dá Log is a 6-kilometre 3-hour route via the pass of Maumahoge; however, because of its positioning on the high rocky central spine of the central Maumturk range, it is also summited in a longer 13-kilometre 5-6 hour loop-route starting at the col of Maumeen Irish: Máméan, in the south, climbing Binn Chaonaigh and then onto the top of Binn idir an dá Log, before descending via Maumahoge, and walking back.

Binn idir an dá Log is also climbed as part of the Maamturks Challenge, a 25-kilometre 10–12 hour walk over the full Maumturks range (from Maam Cross to Leenaun), which is considered one of the "great classic ridge-walks of Ireland", but of "extreme grade" due to the circa 7,600 feet of total ascent.

Since 1975, the University College Galway Mountaineering Club, has run the annual "Maamturks Challenge Walk" (MCW), and man two checkpoints on Binn idir an dá Log; one at the summit (the summit marks 54% of MCW climbing completed), and another at Lough Maumahoge (the Lough marks 63% of MCW climbing, and 51% of MCW distance, completed), which has a 2pm cut-off time for participants.

== Rock climbing ==
While the Maumturks range is not particularly known for rock climbing routes (unlike Bencorr and its Carrot Ridge spur, across the Inagh Valley), some have been developed at a crag just below and west of Lough Maumahoge (L876 532), with routes of 90 to 190 metres at climbing grades of S to HVS.

== Gallery ==
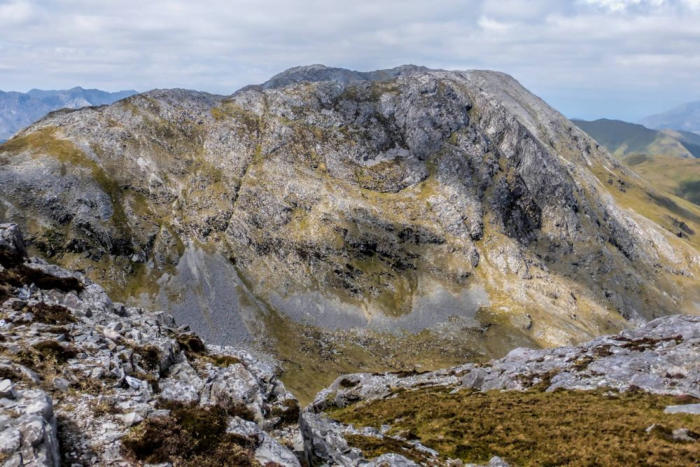
Summit ridge of Binn idir an dá Log viewed from the south on Binn Mhairg

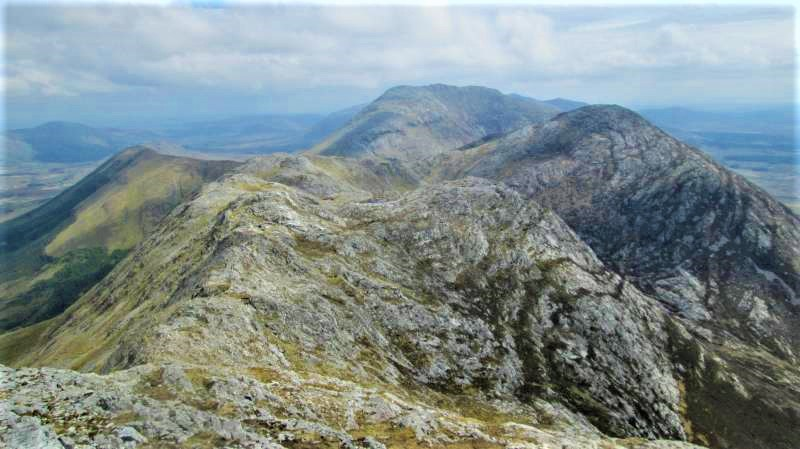
View south from Letterbreckaun showing Knocknahillion (middle right), and Binn idir an dá Log (back, middle)

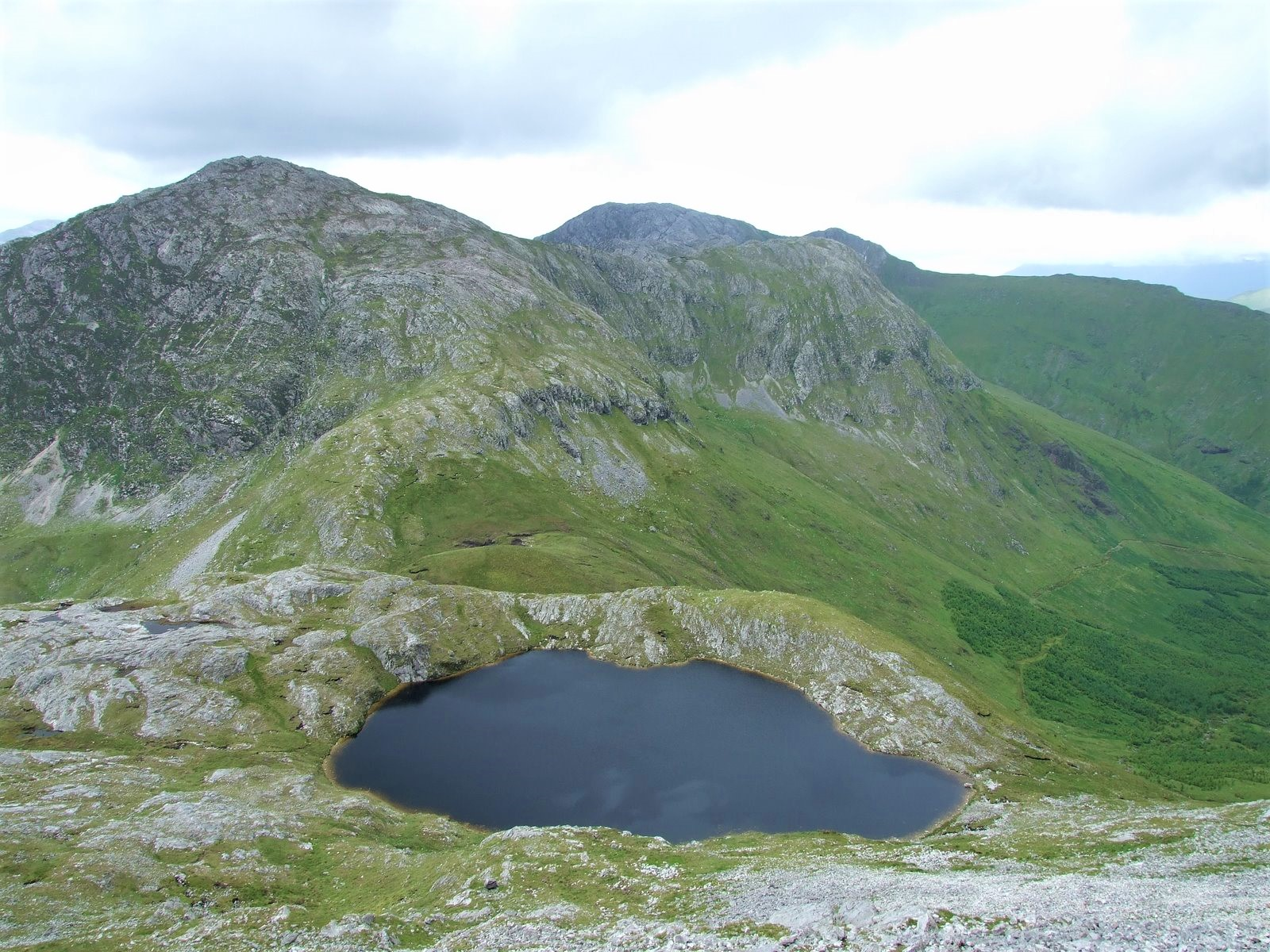
Looking north from summit of Binn idir and dá Log to Lough Maumahoge, Knocknahillion and Letterbreckaun

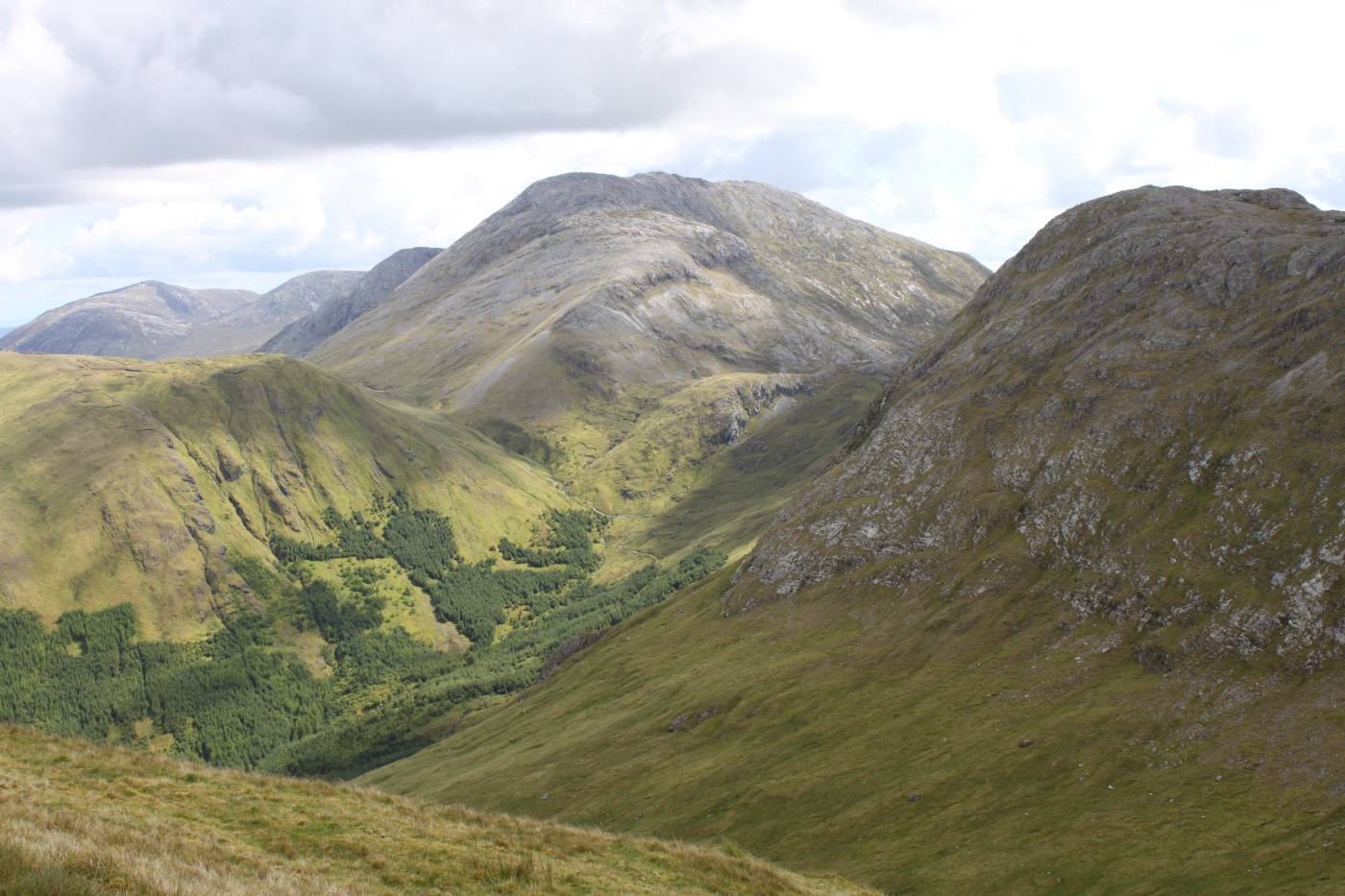
Binn idir an dá Log viewed from east spur of Letterbreckaun, with Knocknahillion on the right

== Bibliography ==
- Fairbairn, Helen (2014). Ireland's Best Walks: A Walking Guide. Collins Press. ISBN 978-1848892118.
- MountainViews Online Database (Simon Stewart) (2013). A Guide to Ireland's Mountain Summits: The Vandeleur-Lynams & the Arderins. Collins Books. ISBN 978-1-84889-164-7.
- Paul Phelan (2011). Connemara & Mayo - A Walking Guide: Mountain, Coastal & Island Walks. Collins Press. ISBN 978-1848891029.
- Dillion, Paddy (2001). Connemara: Collins Rambler's guide. Harper Collins. ISBN 978-0002201216.
- Dillion, Paddy (1993). The Mountains of Ireland: A Guide to Walking the Summits. Cicerone. ISBN 978-1852841102.

== See also ==
- Twelve Bens, major range in Connemara
- Mweelrea, major range in Killary Harbour
- Lists of mountains in Ireland
- Lists of mountains and hills in the British Isles
- List of P600 mountains in the British Isles
- List of Marilyns in the British Isles
- List of Hewitt mountains in England, Wales and Ireland
