= Binn Mhór =

Mountain in County Galway, Ireland

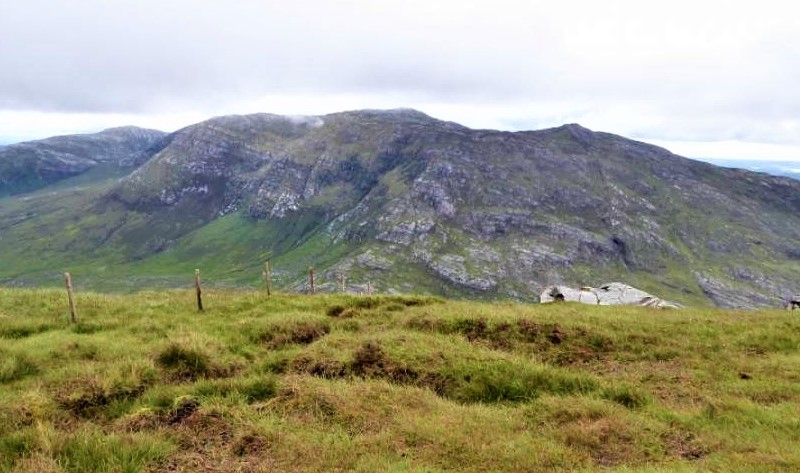
- Binn Mhor as viewed across the pass of Máméan, from the summit of Binn Chaonaigh

Highest point
- Elevation: 661 m (2,169 ft)
- Prominence: 406 m (1,332 ft)
- Listing: 100 Highest Irish Mountains, Marilyn, Hewitt, Arderin, Simm, Vandeleur-Lynam
- Coordinates: 53°29′00″N 9°37′48″W

Naming
- English translation: Great peak
- Language of name: Irish

Geography
- Location within island of Ireland
- Location: County Galway, Ireland
- Parent range: Maumturks
- OSI/OSNI grid: L9184149355
- Topo map: OSi Discovery 44

Geology
- Rock type(s): Pale quartzites, grits, graphitic top bedrock

Climbing
- Easiest route: Via pass of Máméan

Binn Mhór (Irish for "great peak") is one of the Maumturk Mountains of Connemara in County Galway, Ireland. At 661 metres (2,169 ft), it is the third-highest of the Maumturks, the 140th-highest peak in Ireland on the Arderin list, and 171st-highest on the Vandeleur-Lynam list. Binn Mhór is on the southern side of the pass of Máméan, on a small massif that includes Mullach Glas (661 metres (2,169 ft)) and Corcogemore (609 metres (1,998 ft)); this massif is at the far southeastern sector of the long north-west to south-east spine of the Maumturks.

== Naming ==
Irish academic Paul Tempan records that Binn Mhór has also been called "Shannakeala".

== Geography ==
Binn Mhór lies on a small massif in the southeast sector of the Maumturks range, separated from the main range by a deep east–west mountain pass called Máméan. Máméan has been a site of pilgrimage dedicated to Saint Patrick since the 5th century, and several historical items are dug into the lower southerly slopes of Binn Chaonaigh (633 metres (2,077 ft)), on the northern side of Máméan, including a holy well, a cleft in the rock known as Saint Patrick's Bed (Irish: Leaba Phádraig) where the saint reputedly slept, a circle of stones for the Stations of the Cross, and a Mass Rock (Irish: Carraig an Aifrinn).

Binn Mhór's massif has a high east–west ridge with three subsidiary peaks. To the west, and directly overlooking Máméan, is the subsidiary summit of Binn Mhór West Top or Binn Ramhar (596 metres (1,955 ft)), whose prominence of 28 metres (92 ft) qualifies it as an Arderin Beg. To the east along the ridge are the subsidiary summits of Binn Mhór NE Top (640 metres (2,100 ft)), whose prominence of 15 metres (49 ft) qualifies it as an Vandeleur-Lynam; and Binn Mhór East Top (630 metres (2,070 ft)), whose prominence of only 14 metres (46 ft) means it does not qualify on any recognised scale.

Further east along the ridge of Binn Mhor's massif lie the peaks of Mullach Glas (622 metres (2,041 ft)) and Corcogemore (609 metres (1,998 ft)).

Binn Mhór's |prominence of 406 metres (1,332 ft) qualifies it as a Marilyn, and it also ranks as the 89th-highest mountain in Ireland on the MountainViews Online Database, 100 Highest Irish Mountains, where the minimum prominence is 100 metres.

== Hill walking ==
The most straightforward route to the summit of Binn Mhór is the 6-kilometre 2-hour roundtrip route from the pass at Máméan and back; however, because of its positioning on a high ridge of its own small massif, it can also be climbed as a 10-kilometre 4–5 hour route from Corcogemore in the west, across Mullach Ghlas, to the summit of Binn Mhor, and then finishing down at Máméan (e.g. the route requires two cars).

Binn Mhór is also climbed as part of the Maamturks Challenge, a 25-kilometre 10–12 hour walk over the full Maumturks range (from Maam Cross to Leenaun), which is considered one of the "great classic ridge-walks of Ireland", but of "extreme grade" due to the circa 7,600 feet of total ascent. Since 1975, the University College Galway Mountaineering Club has run the annual "Maamturks Challenge Walk" (MCW), and man a checkpoint in the Máméan pass; climbers descend from Binn Mhór at 661 metres to Máméan at only 150 metres, before re-ascending to Binn Chaonaigh at 633 metres.

== Gallery ==
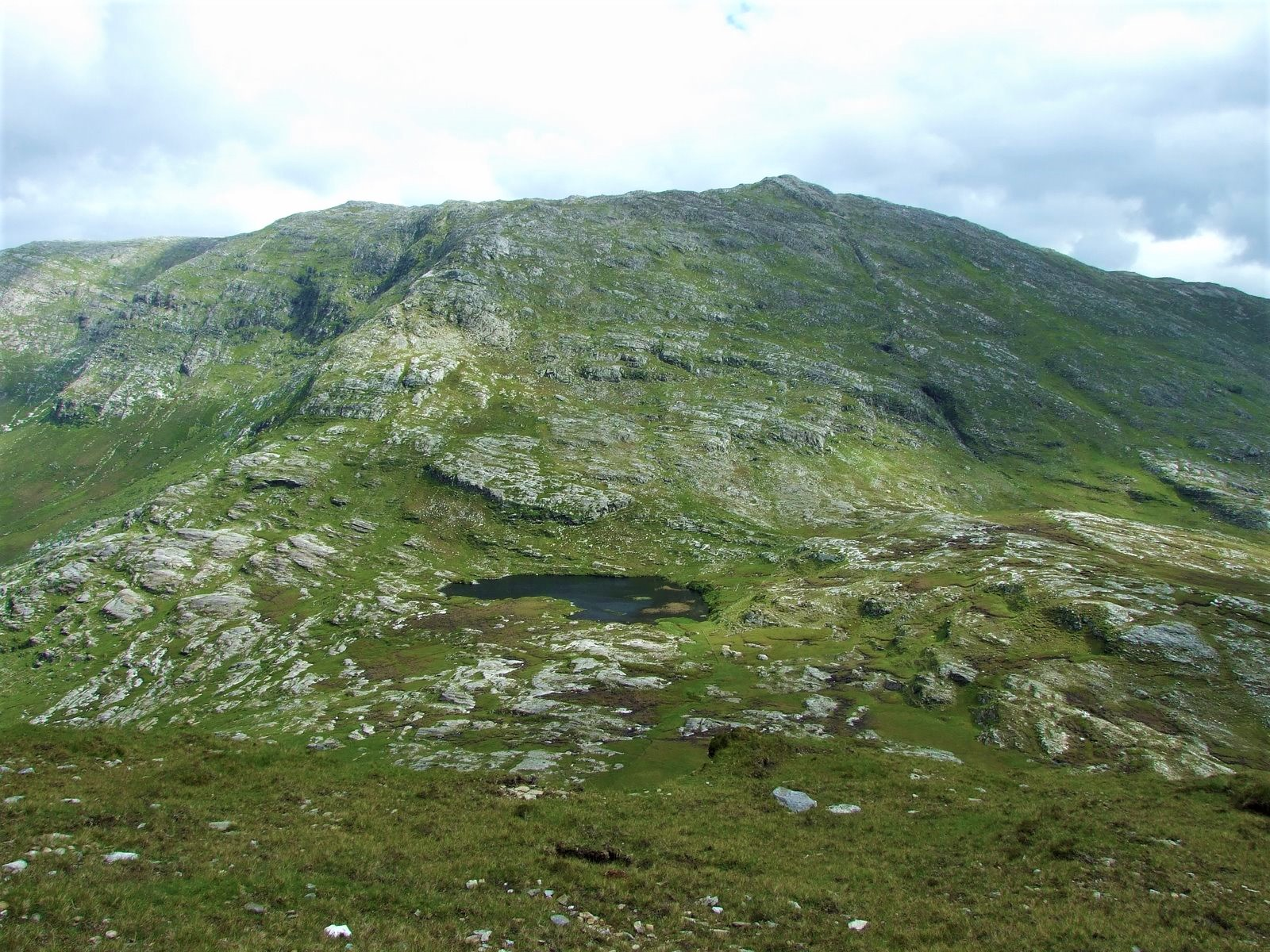
Massif of Binn Mhor, and the lough in Máméan, from summit of Binn Chaonaigh

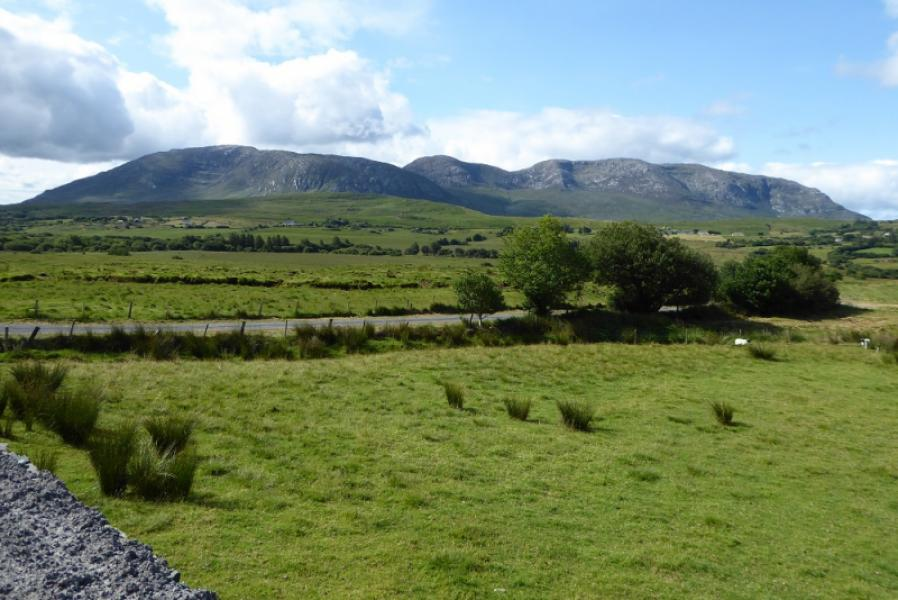
Corcogemore (left), Mullach Glas (centre), and Binn Mhor (right), as viewed from the north

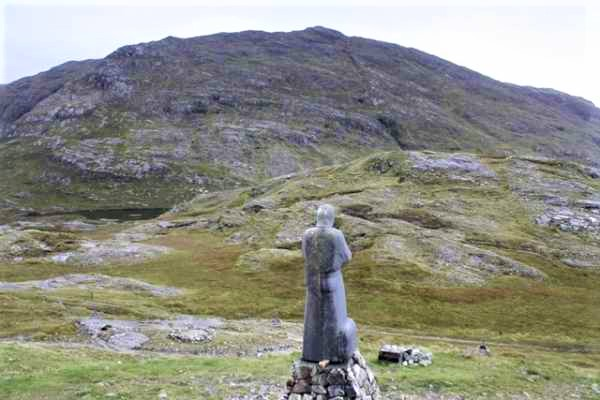
Binn Mhor from the statue of Saint Patrick at Máméan

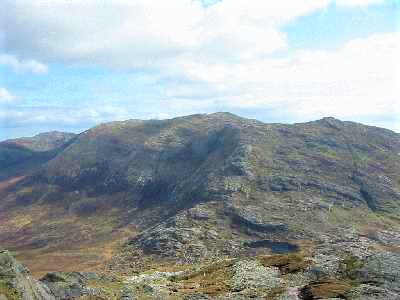
Mullach Glas (back left), and Binn Mhor (centre), viewed from Binn Chaonaigh

== Bibliography ==
- MountainViews Online Database (Simon Stewart) (2013). A Guide to Ireland's Mountain Summits: The Vandeleur-Lynams & the Arderins. Collins Books. ISBN 978-1-84889-164-7.
- Paul Phelan (2011). Connemara & Mayo - A Walking Guide: Mountain, Coastal & Island Walks. Collins Press. ISBN 978-1848891029.
- Dillion, Paddy (2001). Connemara: Collins Rambler's guide. Harper Collins. ISBN 978-0002201216.
- Dillion, Paddy (1993). The Mountains of Ireland: A Guide to Walking the Summits. Cicerone. ISBN 978-1852841102.

== See also ==
- Twelve Bens, major range in Connemara
- Mweelrea, major range in Killary Harbour
- Lists of mountains in Ireland
- Lists of mountains and hills in the British Isles
- List of Marilyns in the British Isles
- List of Hewitt mountains in England, Wales and Ireland
