= Letterbreckaun =

Mountain in Galway, Ireland

- "Binn Bhriocáin"
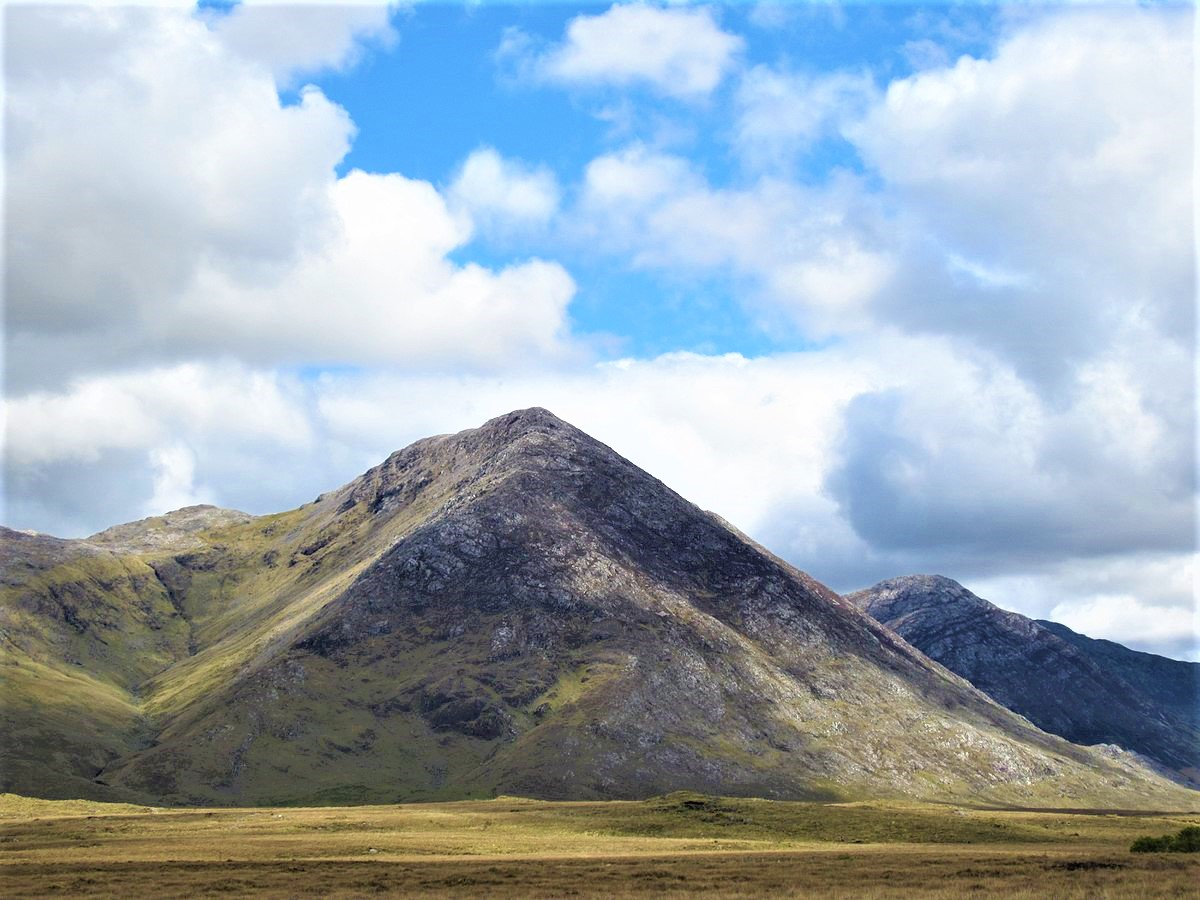
- West face of Letterbreckaun, Inagh Valley

Highest point
- Elevation: 667 m (2,188 ft)
- Prominence: 322 m (1,056 ft)
- Listing: 100 Highest Irish Mountains, Marilyn, Hewitt, Arderin, Simm, Vandeleur-Lynam
- Coordinates: 53°32′00″N 9°43′31″W

Naming
- English translation: Brecan's peak
- Language of name: Irish

Geography
- Location within island of Ireland
- Location: County Galway, Ireland
- Parent range: Maumturks
- OSI/OSNI grid: L8565255093
- Topo map: OSi Discovery 37

Geology
- Rock type(s): Pale quartzites, grits, graphitic top bedrock

Climbing
- Easiest route: Via pass of Maumahoge or the pass of Maam Turk

Letterbreckaun (Irish: Binn Bhriocáin, meaning 'Brecan's peak') is one of the Maumturk Mountains of Connemara in County Galway, Ireland. At 677 metres (2,221 ft), it is the second-tallest of the Maumturks, the 129th–highest peak in Ireland on the Arderin list, and 159th–highest on the Vandeleur-Lynam list. Letterbreckaun is in the middle sector of the long north-west to south-east spine of the Maumturks.

== Naming ==
The anglicised name "Letterbreckaun" comes from the Irish: Leitir Bhriocáin or Leitir Breacáin meaning "Brecan's hillside", and is also the name of a townland on the slope of the mountain. Saint Brecan is a saint associated with Galway county, and is said to be the successor to Saint Enda of Aran.

== Geography ==
Letterbreckaun lies at the northern end of the central sector, of the long north-west to the south-east central spine of the Maumturks range, in the Connemara National Park; when viewed from the west, the peak has a distinctive "pyramidal" shape, in contrast to the rounded shapes of the neighbouring peaks.

To the south, Letterbreckaun is connected by a long winding quartzite rocky ridge to Knocknahillion at 607 metres (1,991 ft); the ridge itself includes the two minor peaks of Barrlugrevagh 558 metres (1,831 ft) and Knocknahillion North Top 541 metres (1,775 ft), and after Knocknahillion, descends to the col of Maumahoge (Irish: Mhám Ochóige).

To the north of Letterbreckaun is the subsidiary summit of Letterbreckaun NE Top 603 metres (1,978 ft), whose prominence of 28 metres (92 ft) qualifies it as an Arderin Beg. Further north, the slopes of Letterbreckaun drop into the sharp and steep "v-shaped" col of Maam Turk (Irish: Mám Tuirc, meaning "pass of the boar"), from which the entire range bears its name. Paul Tempan notes that the "holy well" marked on the OS maps at Maam Turk was noted by Irish historian Ruaidhrí Ó Flaithbheartaigh in 1684, saying: "There is a well in memorie of St. Fechin at Mam-tuirk". Further north from the col of Maam Turk is the minor peak of Maumturkmore, which then crosses the "Col of Despondency" to the grassy sandstone and siltstone massif of Leenaun Hill.

Letterbreckaun's prominence of 322 metres (1,056 ft) qualifies it as a Marilyn, and it also ranks it as the 82nd-highest mountain in Ireland on the MountainViews Online Database, 100 Highest Irish Mountains, where the minimum prominence threshold is 100 metres.

== Hill walking ==
The easiest way summit Letterbreckaun is a 6-kilometre 2-3-hour route via the pass of Maam Turk; however, because of its positioning on the high rocky central spine of the central Maumturk range, it is also summited in a longer 14-kilometre 5–6 hour loop-route starting at the col of Maumahoge in the south, climbing Knocknahillion and then along a winding 2-kilometre rocky ridge to the top of Letterbreckaun, before descending via the "v-shaped" col of Maam Turk.

Letterbreckaun is also climbed as part of the Maamturks Challenge, a 25-kilometre 10–12 hour walk over the full Maumturks range (from Maam Cross to Leenaun), which is considered one of the "great classic ridge-walks of Ireland", but of "extreme grade" due to the circa 7,600 feet of total ascent.

Since 1975, the University College Galway Mountaineering Club, has run the annual "Maamturks Challenge Walk" (MCW), and mans a checkpoint on the summit of Letterbreckaun.

== Gallery ==
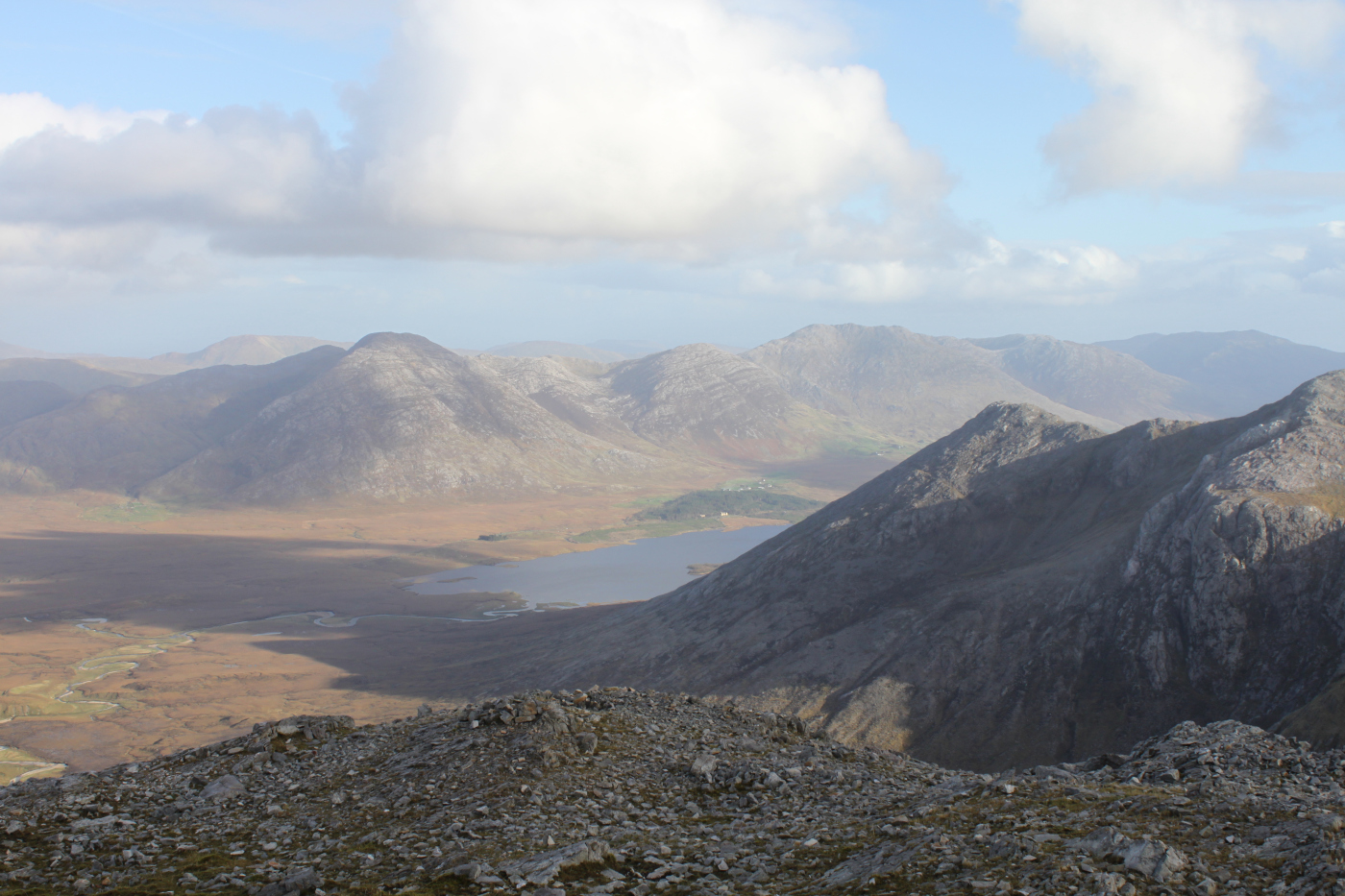
Letterbreckaun (centre, distance) viewed from Benbaun

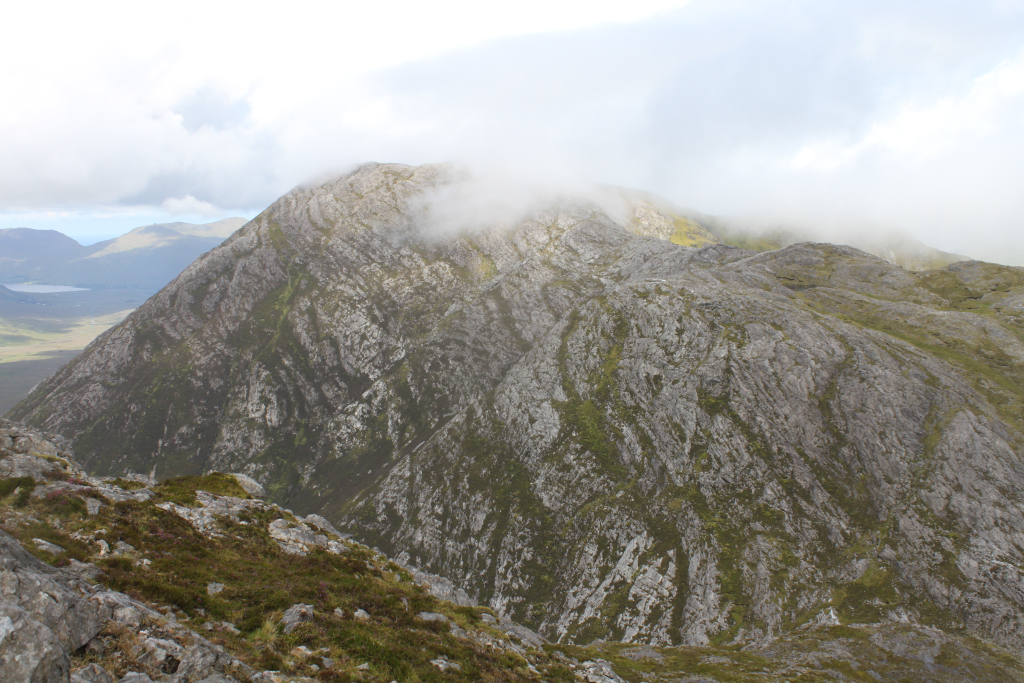
South face of Letterbreckaun from ridge with Knocknahillion

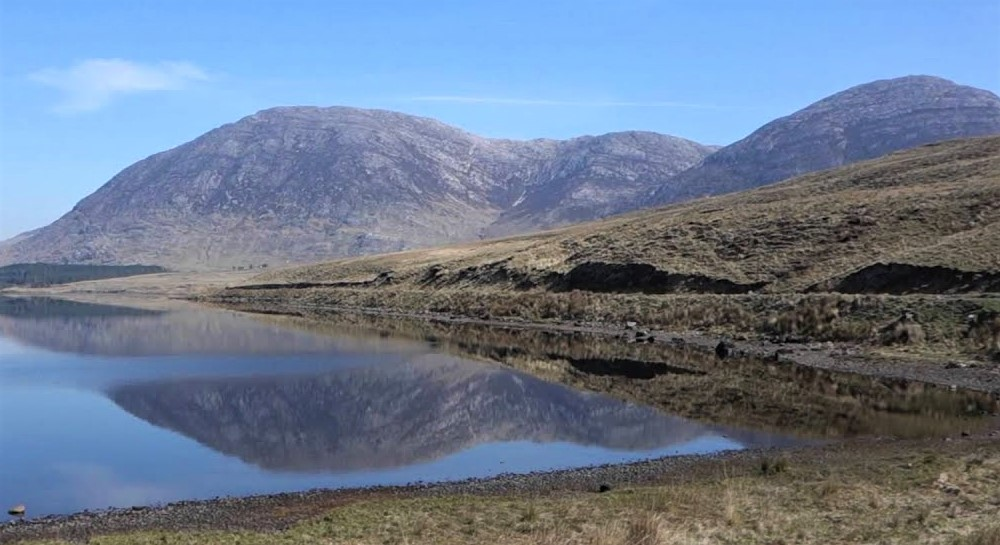
Looking north to Letterbreckaun (left), and Knocknahillion (right), across Lough Inagh

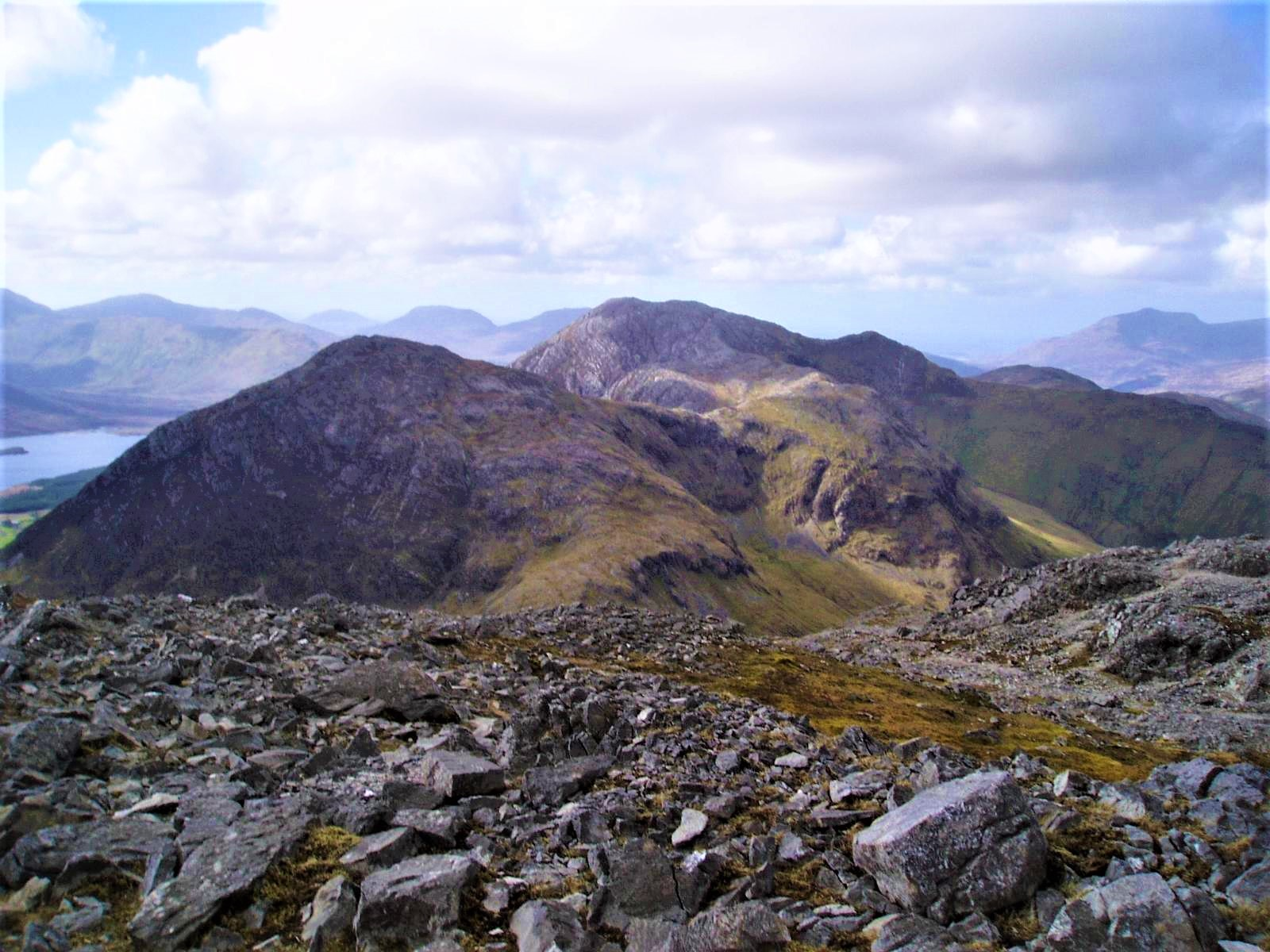
Letterbreckaun behind Knocknahillion, viewed from Binn idir an dá Log

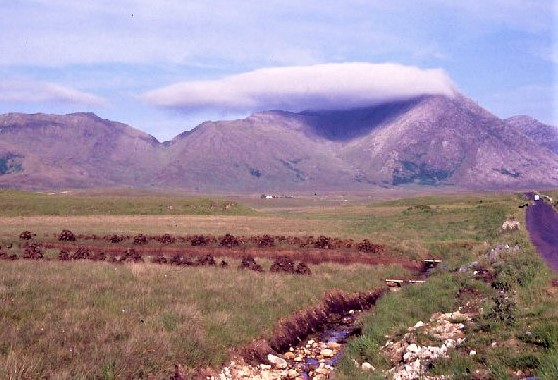
Letterbreckaun (right, in cloud) with the v-shaped pass of Maam Turk (left)

== Bibliography ==
- Fairbairn, Helen (2014). Ireland's Best Walks: A Walking Guide. Collins Press. ISBN 978-1848892118.
- MountainViews Online Database (Simon Stewart) (2013). A Guide to Ireland's Mountain Summits: The Vandeleur-Lynams & the Arderins. Collins Books. ISBN 978-1-84889-164-7.
- Paul Phelan (2011). Connemara & Mayo - A Walking Guide: Mountain, Coastal & Island Walks. Collins Press. ISBN 978-1848891029.
- Dillion, Paddy (2001). Connemara: Collins Rambler's guide. Harper Collins. ISBN 978-0002201216.
- Dillion, Paddy (1993). The Mountains of Ireland: A Guide to Walking the Summits. Cicerone. ISBN 978-1852841102.

== See also ==
- Twelve Bens, major range in Connemara
- Mweelrea, major range in Killary Harbour
- Lists of mountains in Ireland
- Lists of mountains and hills in the British Isles
- List of Marilyns in the British Isles
- List of Hewitt mountains in England, Wales and Ireland
