= Knocknahillion =

Mountain in County Galway, Ireland

- Cnoc na hUilleann
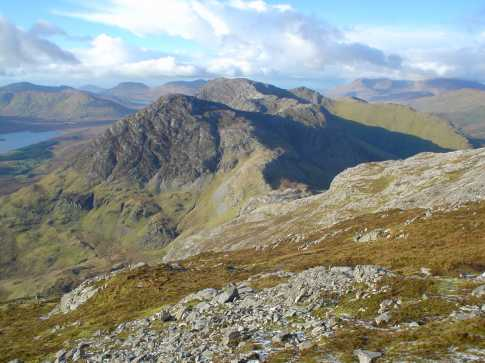
- Knocknahillion, viewed from Binn idir an dá Log; behind is the summit of Letterbreckaun

Highest point
- Elevation: 607 m (1,991 ft)
- Prominence: 152 m (499 ft)
- Listing: Marilyn, Hewitt, Arderin, Simm, Vandeleur-Lynam
- Coordinates: 53°31′19″N 9°42′14″W

Naming
- English translation: hill of the elbow
- Language of name: Irish

Geography
- Location within island of Ireland
- Location: County Galway, Ireland
- Parent range: Maumturks
- OSI/OSNI grid: L8703653756
- Topo map: OSi Discovery 37

Geology
- Rock type(s): Pale quartzites, grits, graphitic top bedrock

Climbing
- Easiest route: Via pass of Maumahoge

Knocknahillion (Irish: Cnoc na hUilleann, meaning 'hill of the elbow') is one of the Maumturk Mountains of Connemara in County Galway, Ireland. At 607 metres (1,991 ft), it is the 210th–highest peak in Ireland on the Arderin list, and 256th–highest on the Vandeleur-Lynam list. Knocknahillion is in the middle sector of the long north-west to the south-east spine of the Maumturks. The summit is offset to the west of the rocky central ridge of the Maumturks, and its western-facing slopes have a distinctive "diagonal" rock stratification when viewed from the Inagh Valley.

== Naming ==
Irish academic Paul Tempan notes that Knocknahillion derives its name from the townlands of Illion and Illion West (Irish: Uillinn, meaning 'elbow'). It is to the west of the central spine of the Maumturks range at a point where the range turns to a more south-easterly direction (like an elbow).

== Geography ==
Knocknahillion is in the middle sector of the long north-west to south-east central spine of the Maumturks range in Connemara.

To the north, Knocknahillion is connected to Letterbreckaun, the 2nd highest peak in the range at 667 metres (2,188 ft), by a high winding rocky ridge that includes the subsidiary peak of Knocknahillion North Top at 541 metres (1,775 ft), whose prominence of 38 metres (125 ft) qualifies it as an Arderin. Further along this ridge lies the minor peak of Barrlugrevagh at 558 metres (1,831 ft), whose prominence of 17 metres (56 ft) qualifies it as an Arderin Beg.

To the southeast of Knocknahillion is the col of Maumahoge (Irish: Mhám Ochóige), which then rises up again to the corrie lake of Lough Maumahoge (Irish: Loch Mhám Ochóige), and eventually to Binn idir an dá Log, the highest mountain in the range at 702 metres (2,303 ft).

== Hill walking ==
The easiest way summit Knocknahillion is a 5-kilometre 2-3-hour route via the pass of Maumahoge; however, because of its positioning on the high rocky central spine of the central Maumturk range, it is also summited in a longer 14-kilometre 5-6 hour loop-route starting at the col of Maumahoge in the south, climbing Knocknahillion and then along a winding 2-kilometre rocky ridge to the top of Letterbreckaun, before descending via the sharp "v-shaped" col of Maam Turk (Irish: Mám Tuirc, meaning "pass of the boar"), from which the entire range bears its name.

Knocknahillion is also climbed as part of the Maamturks Challenge, a 25-kilometre 10–12 hour walk over the full Maumturks range (from Maam Cross to Leenaun), which is considered one of the "great classic ridge-walks of Ireland", but of "extreme grade" due to the circa 7,600 feet of total ascent; however, because the peak of Knocknahillon is offset to the west of the core winding rocky ridge, it is not always summited during the challenge.

== Rock climbing ==
While the Maumturks range is not particularly known for rock climbing routes (unlike Bencorr and its Carrot Ridge spur, across the Inagh Valley), some have been developed at a crag just below and west of Lough Maumahoge (L876 532), with routes of 90 to 190 metres at climbing grades of S to HVS.

== Gallery ==
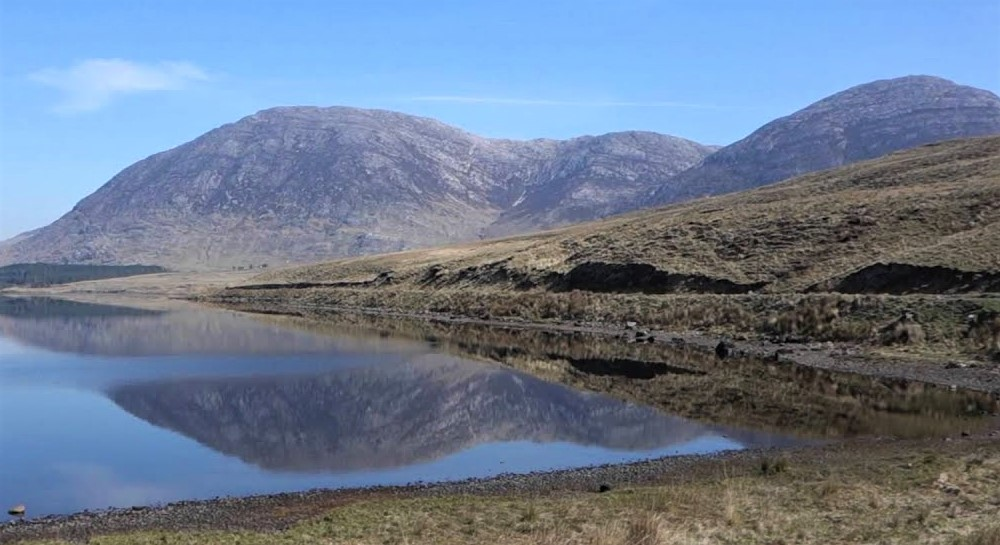
Looking north to Letterbreckaun (left), and Knocknahillion (right), across Lough Inagh

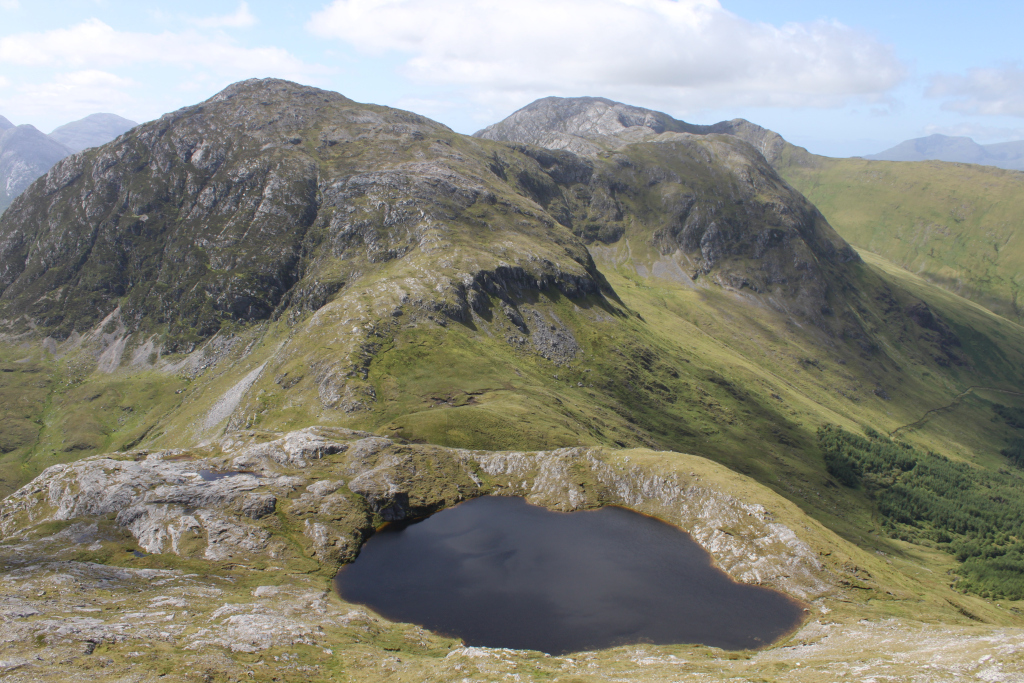
Lough Maumahoge, Knocknahillion (left) and the ridge to Letterbreckaun

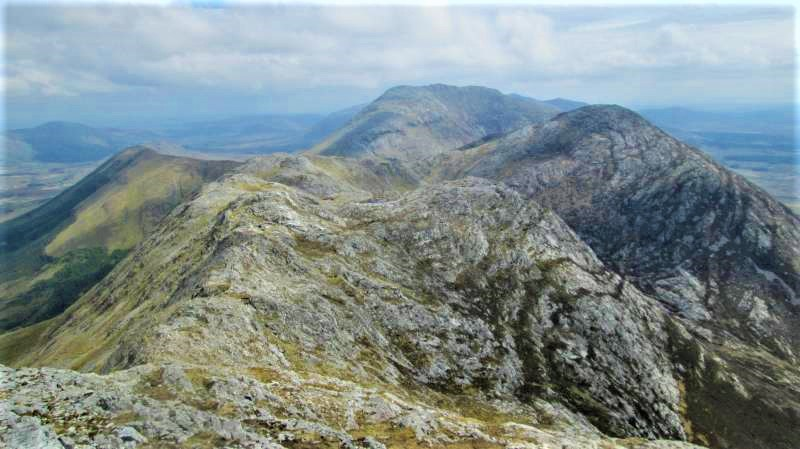
Letterbreckaun to Knockhillion ridge (middle, right), with Binn idir an dá Log (centre, back)

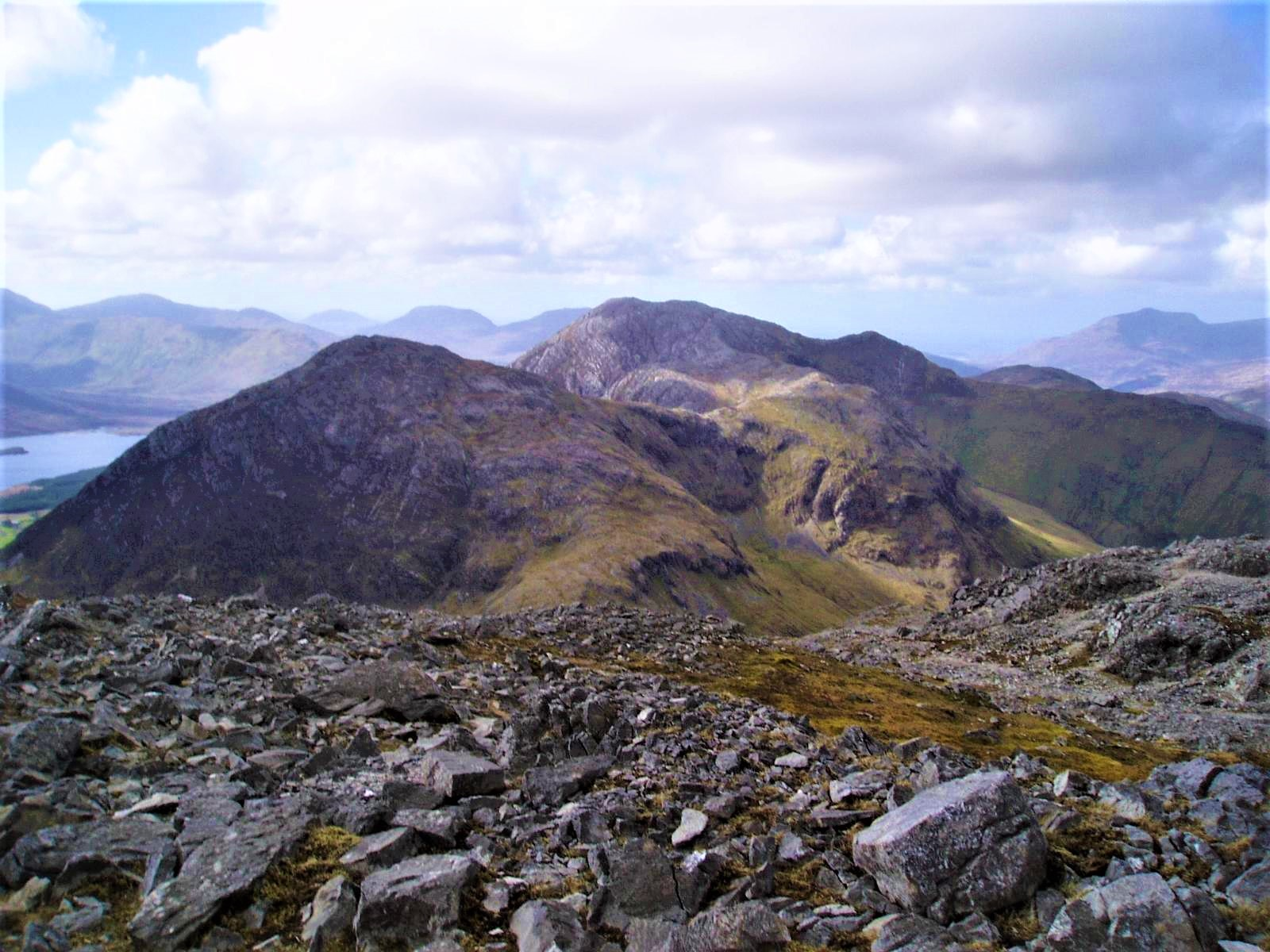
Looking north to Knocknahillion (left), and Letterbreckaun (middle)

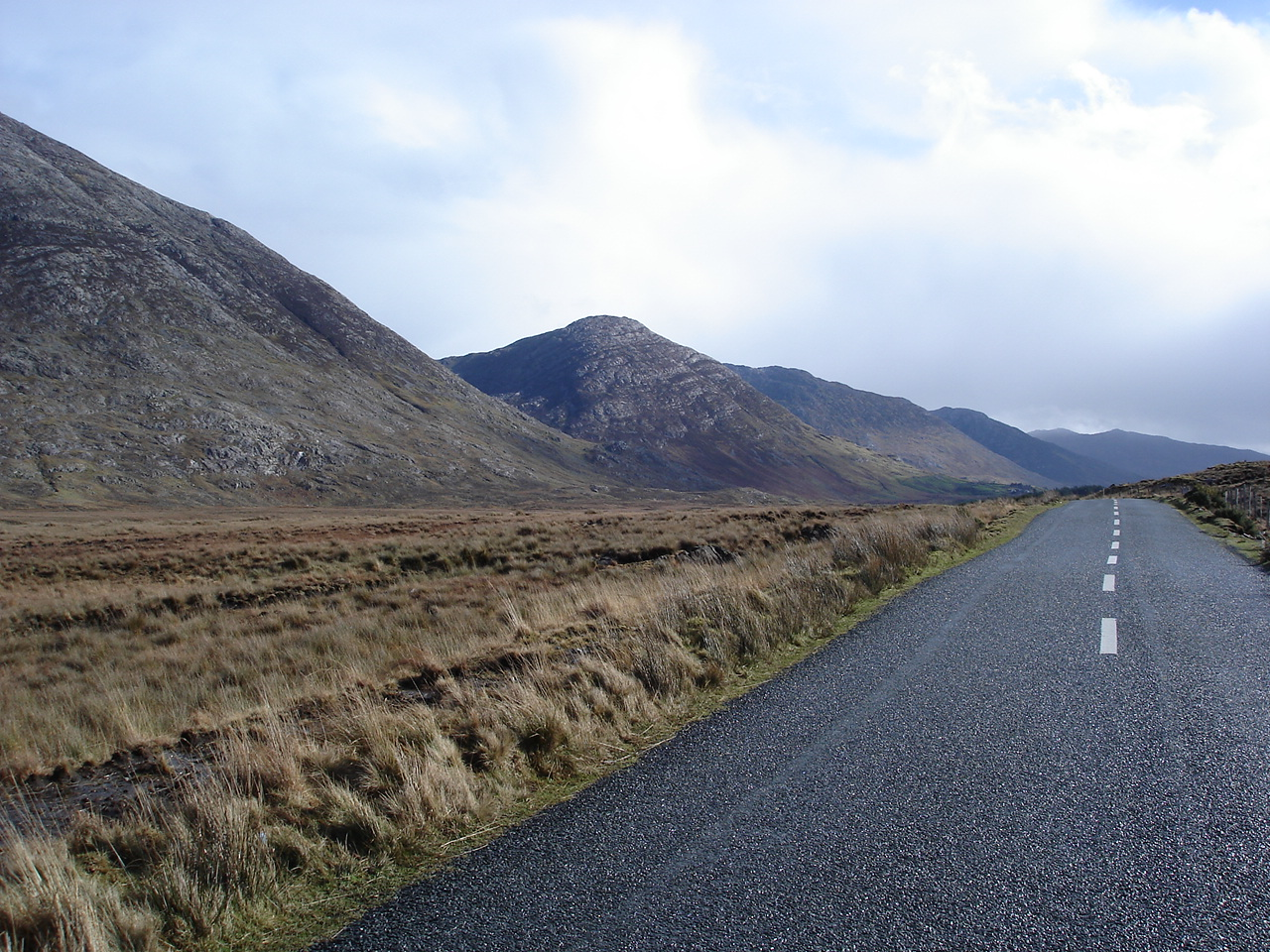
Maumturks range from the Inagh Valley, with Knocknahillion (centre)

== Bibliography ==
- Fairbairn, Helen (2014). Ireland's Best Walks: A Walking Guide. Collins Press. ISBN 978-1848892118.
- MountainViews Online Database (Simon Stewart) (2013). A Guide to Ireland's Mountain Summits: The Vandeleur-Lynams & the Arderins. Collins Books. ISBN 978-1-84889-164-7.
- Paul Phelan (2011). Connemara & Mayo - A Walking Guide: Mountain, Coastal & Island Walks. Collins Press. ISBN 978-1848891029.
- Dillion, Paddy (2001). Connemara: Collins Rambler's guide. Harper Collins. ISBN 978-0002201216.
- Dillion, Paddy (1993). The Mountains of Ireland: A Guide to Walking the Summits. Cicerone. ISBN 978-1852841102.

== See also ==
- Twelve Bens, major range in Connemara
- Mweelrea, major range in Killary Harbour
- Lists of mountains in Ireland
- Lists of mountains and hills in the British Isles
- List of Marilyns in the British Isles
- List of Hewitt mountains in England, Wales and Ireland
