= Máire MacNeill =

Irish folklorist and writer

- Born: 7 December 1904; County Dublin, Ireland
- Died: 15 May 1987 (aged 82); County Clare Ireland
- Occupations: Journalist, folklorist, translator
- Writing career
- Period: Modernist
- Subject: Irish mythology
- Notable work: The Festival of Lughnasa

Máire MacNeill (7 December 1904 – 15 May 1987) was an Irish journalist, folklorist and translator. She is best known for her magisterial study of the Irish harvest festival, The Festival of Lughnasa (1962, 1983).

== Biography ==
She was born at Portmarnock, County Dublin, the second daughter of historian and political figure Eoin MacNeill and Agnes Moore. After the family moved into the city she attended Muckross Park school. She received her BA in Celtic Studies from University College Dublin in 1925. From 1927 to 1932, she worked as a journalist and then as a sub-editor on the Cumann na nGaedheal newspaper, The Star. She also assisted her father with his memoirs.

In 1935, Séamus Ó Duilearga invited her to work for the newly founded Irish Folklore Commission as office manager. She trained in folklore methods at Uppsala University, Sweden, before starting research on the Lughnasadh festival. She examined the 195 sites associated with the festival, the best-known of which is the Croagh Patrick pilgrimage, and also includes other sites such as Máméan.

MacNeill left the Folklore Commission in 1949 to go to Boston where she married poet John L. Sweeney. Her Lughnasa study was published in 1962, for which she received her doctorate. She re-settled in Ireland in 1967 and engaged in a number of translations from the Irish. She died at her home in Corofin, County Clare.

She bequeathed two cubist paintings by Picasso and Juan Gris to the National Gallery of Ireland (Dublin).
