= Maumturks =

Mountain range in Connemara, Ireland

Maumturks (Maamturks)
- Irish: Sléibhte Mhám Toirc
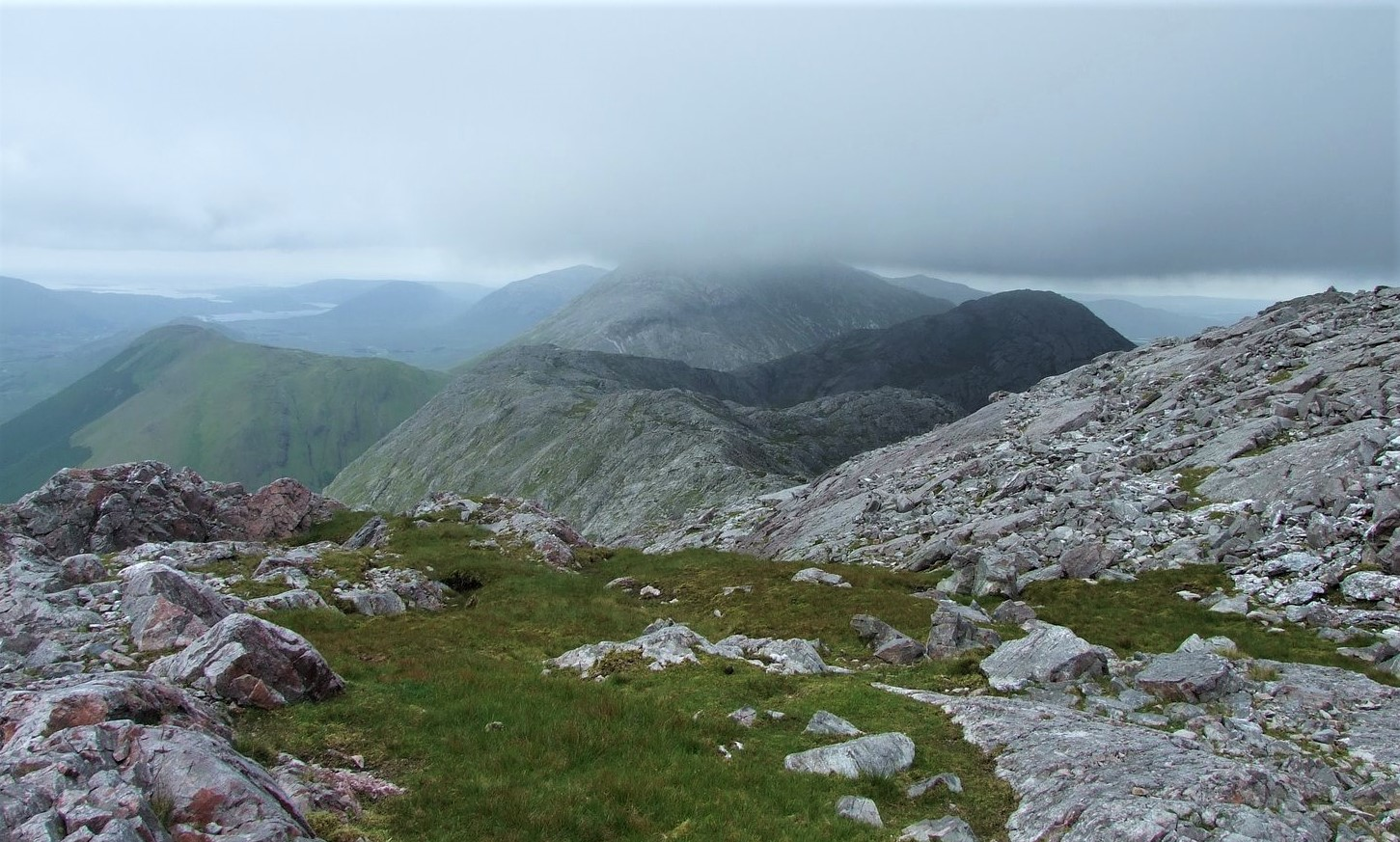
- Maumturk Mountains: looking south from Letterbreckaun towards Knocknahillion and Binn idir an dá Log.

Highest point
- Peak: Binn idir an dá Log
- Elevation: 702 m (2,303 ft)
- Coordinates: 53.48°N 9.60°W

Dimensions
- Length: 25 km (16 mi) North West to South East

Naming
- English translation: pass of the boar
- Language of name: Irish language

Geography
- Location within Ireland
- Location: Connemara, County Galway, Ireland
- Country: Ireland
- Provinces of Ireland: Connacht

Geology
- Mountain type(s): Pale quartzites, grits, graphitic top

Climbing
- Normal route: "Maamturks Challenge" (Note: The entire route covers just under 25 kilometres, 7,600 ft of elevation, and generally takes 10–12 hours for competent hill walkers to complete)

The Maumturks or Maamturks (Irish: Sléibhte Mhám Toirc; mountains of the boar's pass) (Note: The direct translation of Mhám Toirc is "pass of the boar"; there are several "turk" placenames in Connemara.) is a mountain range in Connemara, (Note: The range is outside the boundary of the Connemara National Park and on private property, but climbing access is granted.) County Galway, in the west of Ireland. It is a long, broadly-straight range, consisting of weathered quartzite peaks in its central section. The Maumturks lie east of the Twelve Bens, on the other side of Lough Inagh and the Inagh Valley (a Western Way route).

== Hill walking ==
The walk of the full range (from Maam Cross to Leenaun), is considered one of the "great classic ridge-walks of Ireland", and since 1975, the University of Galway Mountaineering Club, has run the annual "Maamturks Challenge", a walk covering the entire 25–kilometre range in a single day. Near the centre of the range in a deep glen is Irish: Máméan, a site of pilgrimage dedicated to Saint Patrick.

== List of peaks ==
The table below lists some of the highest major mountain peaks of the Maumturk Mountains.

Rank	Mountain peak	Elevation	English Name
1	Binn idir an dá Log	702 m (2,303 ft)	Benadolug‡
2	Binn Bhriocáin	667 m (2,188 ft)	Letterbreckaun
3	Binn Mhór	661 m (2,169 ft)	Binn Mhor
4	Binn Chaonaigh	633 m (2,077 ft)	Binn Chaonaigh
5	Mullach Glas	622 m (2,041 ft)	Mullach Glas
6	An Meall Dubh	618 m (2,028 ft)	Leenaun Hill
7	Binn Mhairg	612 m (2,008 ft)	Binn Mhairg
8	Corcogemore*	609 m (1,998 ft)	Corcogemore*
9	Cnoc na hUilleann	607 m (1,991 ft)	Knocknahillion

(‡) The anglicised version is rarely used or marked on any maps; a more common anglicised name is the incorrect name of "Barrslievenaroy" (or "Baurslievenaroy"), which is a nearby townland on the slopes of Binn idir an Da Log.
(*) Cartographer Tim Robinson notes: "the Ordnance Survey has been incorrectly calling this mountain 'Leckavrea' for a hundred and fifty years." "Lackavrea" (Ir. Leic Aimhréidh) is the mountain to the east on the other side of Mám Aodha.

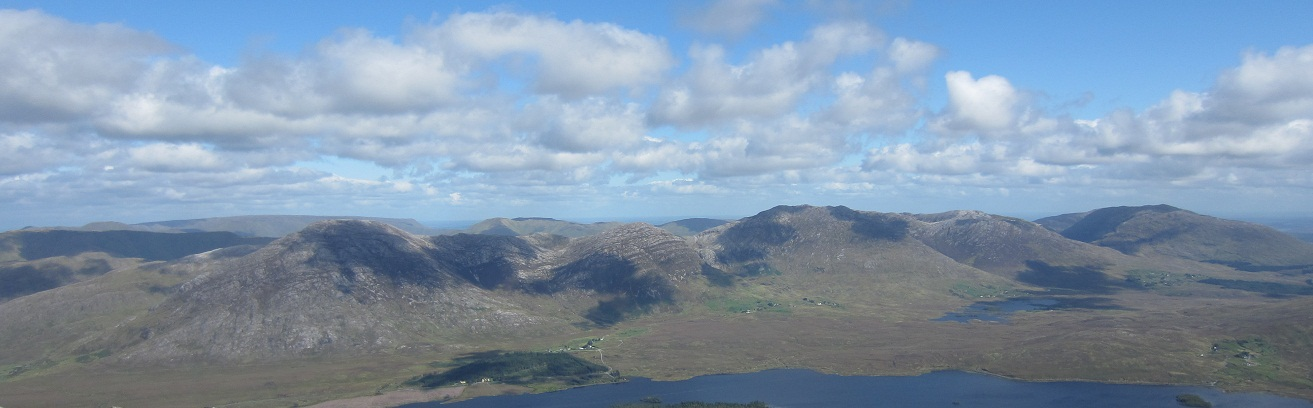
The Maumturks range as seen from across the Inagh Valley in the Twelve Bens range. Letterbreckaun is the most prominent mountain to the left (north), followed by Knocknahillion, and then the large Binn Idir an Dá Log summits and ridge. The range then drops into the valley of Máméan, before rising up to Binn Mhór to the right (south)

== Rock climbing ==
While the Maumturks are not known for rock climbing, the Loch Mhám Ochóige area of the range has rock climbs in the V-Diff to HVS grades.

== See also ==
- Mweelrea, major range in Killary Harbour
- Twelve Bens, major range in Connemara
- Lists of mountains in Ireland
- Lists of mountains and hills in the British Isles
