= Tailte Éireann =

Statutory body overseeing property and spatial data in Ireland

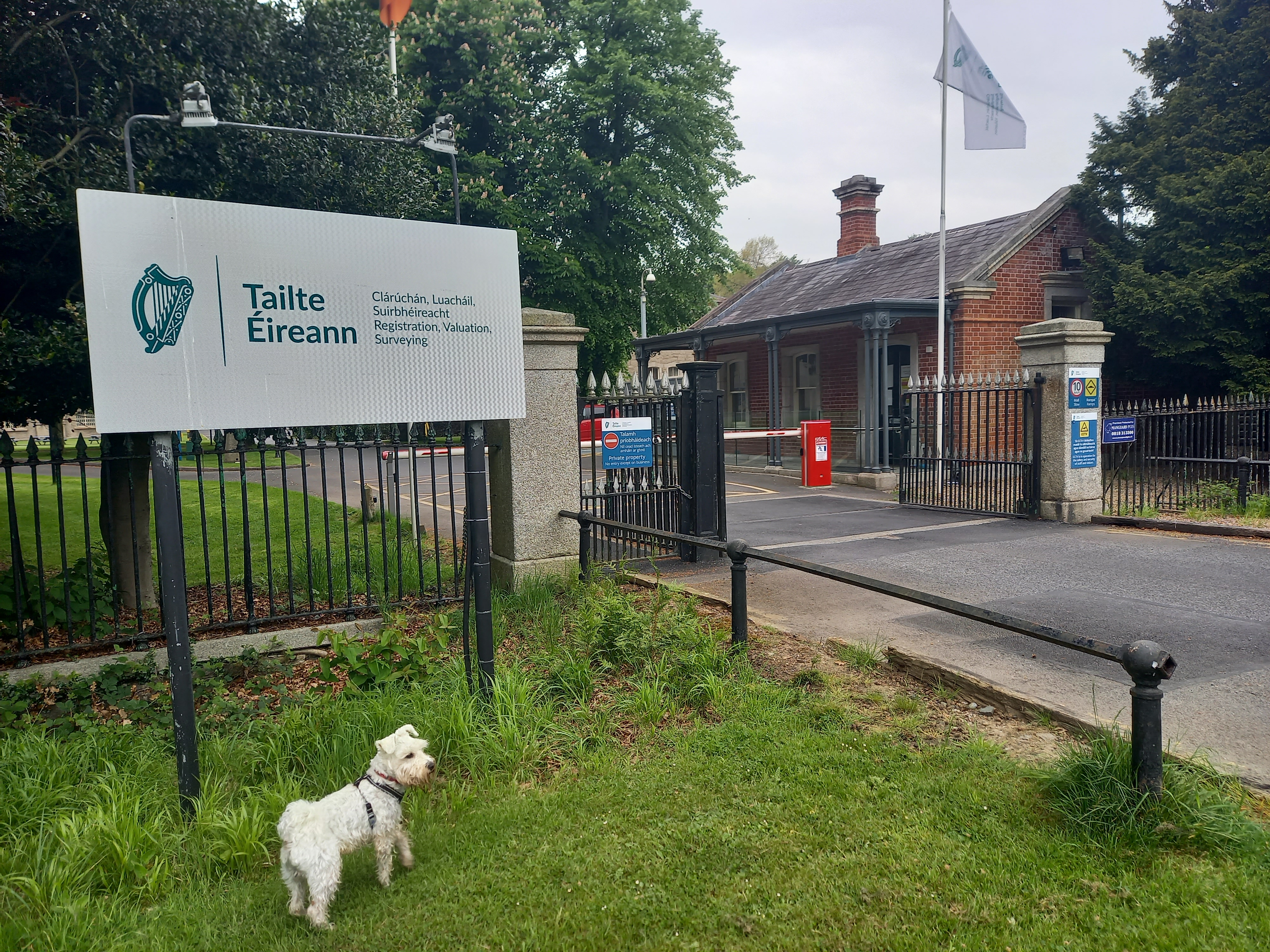
- Headquarters of Tailte Éireann (formerly the Ordnance Survey Office)

Agency overview
- Formed: 1 March 2023
- Preceding agencies: Property Registration Authority; Valuation Office; Ordnance Survey Ireland
- Jurisdiction: Ireland
- Headquarters: Phoenix Park, Dublin
- Minister responsible: Minister for Housing, Local Government and Heritage
- Agency executive: Liam O'Sullivan, Chief Executive Officer
- Key document: Tailte Éireann Act 2022
- Website: Official website

Tailte Éireann (lit. 'Irish Lands') is a state agency in Ireland responsible for property registrations, property valuation and national mapping services. It was established on 1 March 2023 from a merger of the Property Registration Authority (PRA), the Valuation Office (VO) and Ordnance Survey Ireland (OSI).

In January 2018, the departmental responsibility relating to the Ordnance Survey Ireland, the Property Registration Authority, and the Valuation Office were transferred to the Department of Housing, Planning and Local Government. Under the Tailte Éireann Act 2022, these bodies were dissolved and their functions transferred to Tailte Éireann.

== Organisation ==
In February 2023, Liz Pope, CEO of the Property Registration Authority, was appointed as transition lead for Tailte Éireann. In June 2023, Liam O'Sullivan was appointed as CEO.
