= Binn Chaonaigh =

Mountain in County Galway, Ireland

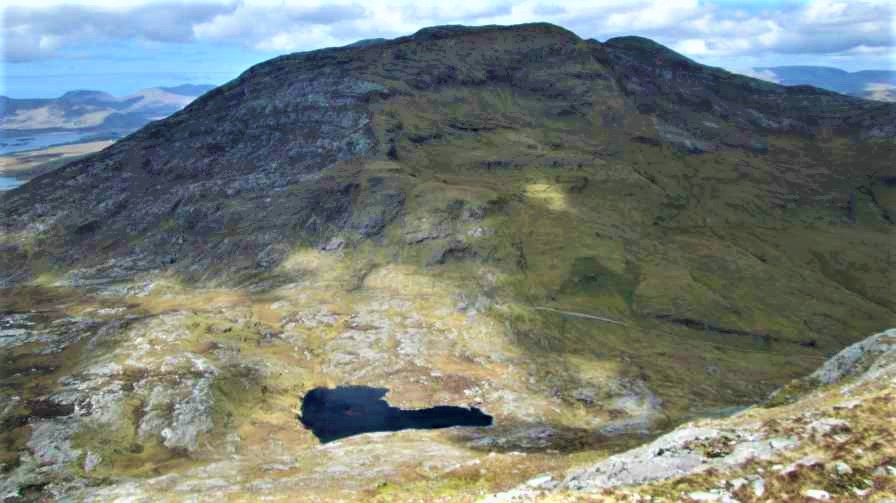
- Binn Chaonaigh, as viewed from across the Máméan pass, on the north side of Binn Mhór

Highest point
- Elevation: 633 m (2,077 ft)
- Prominence: 108 m (354 ft)
- Listing: Hewitt, Arderin, Simm, Vandeleur-Lynam
- Coordinates: 53°30′10″N 9°39′29″W

Naming
- English translation: peak of the moss
- Language of name: Irish

Geography
- Location within island of Ireland
- Location: County Galway, Ireland
- Parent range: Maumturks
- OSI/OSNI grid: L9003751562
- Topo map: OSi Discovery 37

Geology
- Rock type(s): Pale quartzites, grits, graphitic top bedrock

Climbing
- Easiest route: Via pass of Maumean

Binn Chaonaigh (Irish for "peak of the moss") is one of the Maumturk Mountains of Connemara in County Galway, Ireland. At 633 metres (2,077 ft), it is the fourth-highest of the Maumturks, the 185th-highest peak in Ireland on the Arderin list, and the 223rd-highest on the Vandeleur-Lynam list. It is in the middle sector of the long north-west to south-east spine of the Maumturks.

== Geography ==
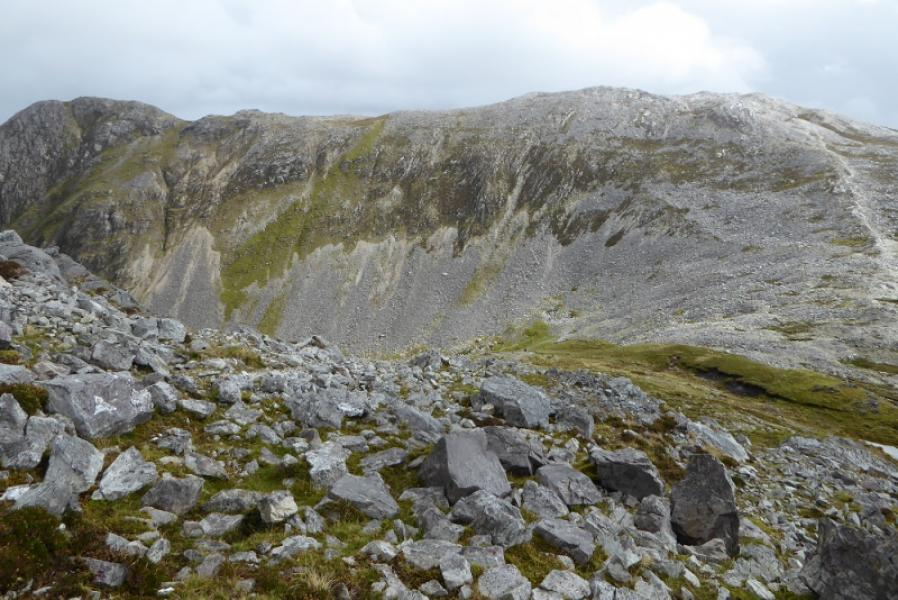
Binn Mhairg (l) and Binn Chaonaigh (r) from Binn idir an dá Log SE Top.

Binn Chaonaigh lies on a small massif between Binn idir an dá Log to the northwest, the highest peak in the range at 702 metres (2,303 ft), and the large mountain pass of Maumeen or Maumean (Irish: Máméan meaning "pass of the birds"), that cuts deep across the southern sector of the Maumturks range.

To the immediate northeast of Binn Chaonaigh, at the end of a long rocky spur, lies the subsidiary peak of Binn Mhairg (meaning "peak of woe") at 612 metres (2,008 ft). Binn Mharig's prominence of 15 metres (49 ft) qualifies it as a Vandeleur-Lynam, however its location off the main central ridge of the Maumturks range, mean that it is a less frequented peak.

On the southern side of the pass of Máméan, lies Binn Mhór, which at 661 metres (2,169 ft) is the 3rd-highest peak in the Maumturks range.

== Máméan Pilgrimage ==
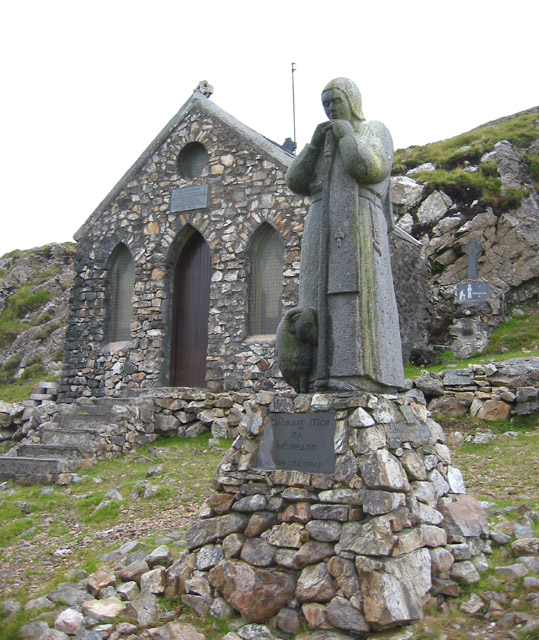
Statue of Saint Patrick, Máméan

The pass of Máméan at the base of Binn Chaonaigh has been a site of Christian pilgrimage dedicated to Saint Patrick that goes back to the 5th-century, and before that date, to the pagan festivals of Lughnasadh. The pilgrimage fell into disrepute in the 19th-century due to local faction-fighting and poitín drinking at the events, and by the mid-1900s had almost died out completely. In 1979, Fr. Micheál MacGréil led the revival of the annual pilgrimage and development of the site. A pilgrimage now takes place three times a year on Saint Patrick's Day, Good Friday, and the first Sunday in August.

The site contains a holy well, a cleft in the rock dug into Binn Chaonaigh known as Saint Patrick's Bed (Irish: Leaba Phádraig) where the Saint reputedly slept, a circle of stones for the Stations of the Cross, and a Mass Rock (Irish: Carraig an Aifrinn), which was used during the 18th-century in penal times when Catholicism was outlawed in Ireland. Fr. MacGréil oversaw the building of a small chapel (Irish: Cillín Phádraig) on the site in the 1980s, and in 1986, sculpturer Cliodhna Cussen added a statue of Saint Patrick depicted as a shepherd with a sheep at his feet.

The Irish folklorist and translator Máire MacNeill, chronicled various stories of Saint Patrick's arrival at Máméan in 441 AD, and his fights to banish the pagan deity of Crom Dubh, several of which involve Crom taking the form of a bull which ends up being drowned in the lake at Máméan.

== Hill walking ==
The most straightforward way summit Binn Chaonaigh is a 6-kilometre 2-3-hour round-trip via the pass of Maumean; however, because of its positioning on the high rocky central spine of the central Maumturk range, it is also summited in a longer 13-kilometre 5-6 hour loop-route starting at the col of Maumeen and climbing Binn Chaonaigh and then onto the top of Binn idir an dá Log, before descending via Maumahoge, and walking back to Maumeen.

Binn Chaonaigh is also climbed as part of the Maamturks Challenge, a 25-kilometre 10–12 hour walk over the full Maumturks range (from Maam Cross to Leenaun), which is considered one of the "great classic ridge-walks of Ireland", but of "extreme grade" due to the circa 7,600 feet of total ascent.

Since 1975, the University College Galway Mountaineering Club, has run the annual "Maamturks Challenge Walk" (MCW), and man a checkpoint on either side of Binn Chaonaigh; one at Maumeen, and another at Binn idir an dá Log (the summit of Binn idir dá Log marks 54% of MCW climbing completed).

== Bibliography ==
- Fairbairn, Helen (2014). Ireland's Best Walks: A Walking Guide. Collins Press. ISBN 978-1848892118.
- MountainViews Online Database (Simon Stewart) (2013). A Guide to Ireland's Mountain Summits: The Vandeleur-Lynams & the Arderins. Collins Books. ISBN 978-1-84889-164-7.
- Paul Phelan (2011). Connemara & Mayo - A Walking Guide: Mountain, Coastal & Island Walks. Collins Press. ISBN 978-1848891029.
- Dillion, Paddy (2001). Connemara: Collins Rambler's guide. Harper Collins. ISBN 978-0002201216.
- Dillion, Paddy (1993). The Mountains of Ireland: A Guide to Walking the Summits. Cicerone. ISBN 978-1852841102.

== See also ==
- Twelve Bens, major range in Connemara
- Mweelrea, major range in Killary Harbour
- Lists of mountains in Ireland
- Lists of mountains and hills in the British Isles
- List of Hewitt mountains in England, Wales and Ireland
