= Ordnance Survey Ireland =

Former national mapping agency of Ireland

State Agency of the Department of Housing, Local Government and Heritage overview
- Formed: 1 April 1922
- Preceding agencies: Ordnance Survey; Ordnance Survey of Ireland
- Dissolved: 1 March 2023
- Superseding State Agency of the Department of Housing, Local Government and Heritage: Tailte Éireann
- Jurisdiction: Ireland
- Headquarters: Phoenix Park, Dublin
- Employees: 235
- State Agency of the Department of Housing, Local Government and Heritage executive: Ronan O'Reilly, Chairman
- Key document: Ordnance Survey Ireland Act 2001
- Website: https://tailte.ie/

Ordnance Survey Ireland (OSI; Irish: Suirbhéireacht Ordanáis Éireann) was the national mapping agency of the Republic of Ireland. It was established on 4 March 2002 as a body corporate. It was the successor to the former Ordnance Survey of Ireland. It and the Ordnance Survey of Northern Ireland (OSNI) were themselves the successors to the Irish operations of the British Ordnance Survey. OSI was part of the Irish public service. OSI was headquartered at Mountjoy House in the Phoenix Park in Dublin, which had previously been the headquarters of the British Ordnance Survey in Ireland until 1922.

In March 2023, the Ordnance Survey was dissolved and its functions transferred to a new body called Tailte Éireann, which also incorporates the Property Registration Authority and the Valuation Office.

== Organisation ==
Under the Ordnance Survey Ireland Act 2001, the Ordnance Survey of Ireland was dissolved and a new corporate body called Ordnance Survey Ireland was established in its place. OSI was an autonomous corporate body, with a remit to cover its costs of operation from its sales of data and derived products, which sometimes raised concerns about the mixing of public responsibilities with commercial imperatives. It employed 235 staff in the Phoenix Park and in six regional offices in Cork, Ennis, Kilkenny, Longford, Sligo and Tuam. OSI had sales of €13.3 million in 2012.

== Products ==
The most prominent consumer publications of OSI were the Dublin City and District Street Guide, an atlas of Dublin city, and the Complete Road Atlas of Ireland which it published in co-operation with Land and Property Services Northern Ireland (formerly the Ordnance Survey of Northern Ireland). The board also published (jointly with OSNI) a series of 1:50000 maps of the entire island known as the Discovery Series and a series of 1:25000 maps of places of interest (such as the Aran Islands and Killarney national park) and the Geology of Ireland.

== History ==
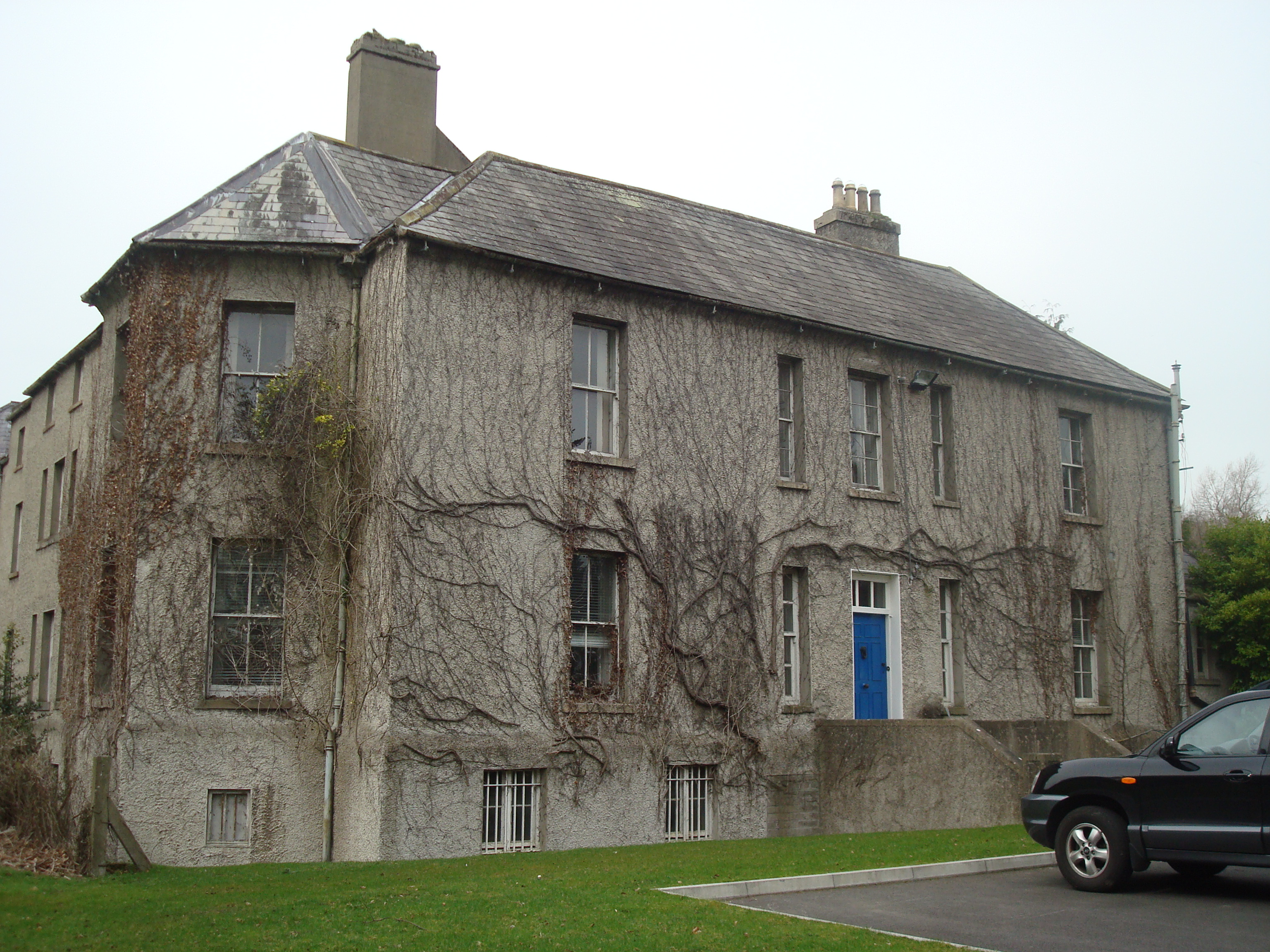
Mountjoy House, the headquarters of Ordnance Survey Ireland, in the Phoenix Park, Dublin

Thomas Colby, the long-serving Director-General of the Ordnance Survey in Great Britain, was the first to suggest that the Ordnance Survey be used to map Ireland. A highly detailed survey of the whole of Ireland would be extremely useful for the British government, both as a key element in the process of levying local taxes based on land valuations and for military planning. In 1824, a committee was established under the direction of Thomas Spring Rice, MP for Limerick, to oversee the foundation of an Irish Ordnance Survey. Spring Rice believed in the importance of Irish involvement in the mapping process but was overruled by the Duke of Wellington, who did not believe Irish surveyors were qualified for the task. Instead, the Irish Ordnance Survey was initially staffed entirely by members of the British Army.

From 1825–46, teams of surveyors led by officers of the Royal Engineers, and men from the ranks of the Royal Sappers and Miners, traversed Ireland, creating a unique record of a landscape undergoing rapid transformation. The resulting maps (primarily at 6″ scale, with greater detail for urban areas, to an extreme extent in Dublin) portrayed the country in a degree of detail never attempted before, and when the survey of the whole country was completed in 1846, it was a world first. Both the maps and surveying were executed to a high degree of engineering excellence available at the time using triangulation and with the help of tools developed for the project, most notably the strong "limelight". The concrete triangulation posts built on the summits of many Irish mountains can still be seen to this day.

The Royal Engineer officers in charge of the operation were Thomas Colby and Lieutenant Thomas Larcom. They were assisted by George Petrie, who headed the Survey's Topographical Department which employed the likes of John O'Donovan and Eugene O'Curry in scholarly research into placenames. Captain J.E. Portlock compiled extensive information on agricultural produce and natural history, particularly geology.

Despite the exclusion of Irish surveyors, this mapping scheme provided numerous opportunities for employment to Irish people, who worked as skilled or semi-skilled fieldwork labourers, and as clerks in the subsidiary Memoir project that was designed to illustrate and complement the maps by providing data on the social and productive worth of the country.

The total cost of the Irish Survey was £860,000 (adjusted for inflation, equivalent to approximately £100,000,000 in 2018). The original survey was later revisited and revised maps were issued on a number of occasions. All of these historical maps (at least up to 1922) are in the public domain and while the originals can be hard to find, they can be freely reproduced.

=== From 1922 ===
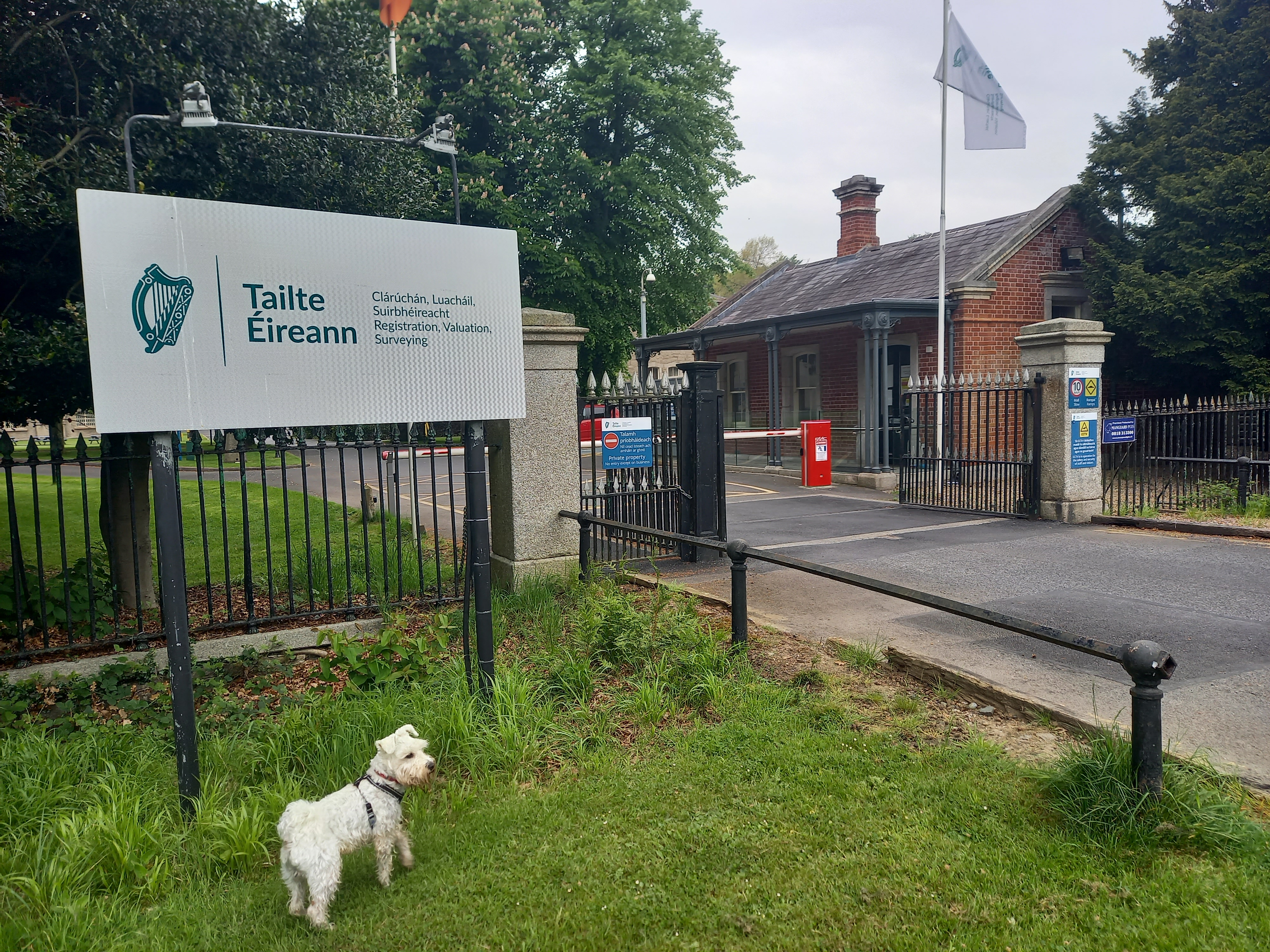
Headquarters of Tailte Éireann (formerly the Ordnance Survey Office)

The British Ordnance Survey ceased to map Ireland just before the creation of the Irish Free State in 1922 (the Partition of Ireland having already taken place in May 1921 upon the creation of Northern Ireland). The new Ordnance Survey of Northern Ireland (OSNI) officially came into existence on 1 January 1922, while the new Ordnance Survey of Ireland (OSI) came into being slightly later, on 1 April 1922.

The OSI was initially part of the Irish Army under the Department of Defence. All staff employed were military personnel until the 1970s, when the first civilian employees were recruited.

In more recent times, the Ordnance Survey of Ireland supplemented traditional ground surveying with mapping based on aerial photography. It has also worked with the postal service, An Post, to gather and structure geographic data.

In 2022, the Tailte Éireann Act dissolved the Property Registration Authority and OSI and transferred the functions of those bodies, along with the functions of the Commissioner of Valuation and the Boundary Surveyor, to Tailte Éireann. The dissolution and transfer took effect on 1 March 2023.

== Cultural depiction ==
The national survey carried out between 1825 and 1846 is the focus of the 1981 play Translations by Brian Friel. The main theme is the inscription of Irish language place names in an anglicised form, using a phonetic rendering for British anglophone ears of an approximate Irish pronunciation.

== See also ==
- Irish grid reference system
- Irish Transverse Mercator
- State Agencies of the Republic of Ireland
