= Ballynahinch railway station, County Galway =

Disused railway station in County Galway, Ireland

Ballinahinch railway station

General information
- Location: County Galway; Ireland
- Coordinates: 53.4553°N 9.8669°W

History
- Original company: Midland Great Western Railway
- Pre-grouping: Great Southern Railways

Key dates
- 1895: Station opens
- 1935: Station closes
Route map
Location

Ballynahinch railway station was on the Midland Great Western Railway (MGWR) Clifden branch line from Galway.

== History ==
The station was the last from on the line to Clifden, some 5 miles (8.0 km) distant, c. 42 miles (68 km) miles from Galway and just 5 miles (8.0 km) from the previous station Recess. Like Maam Cross the station was not immediately ready when public services started to Clifden on 1 July 1895 and opened a little later. The station served the area of Ballinahinch as well as Ballynahinch Castle, which had been built in 1684 for the Martyn family. In the early 1900s, the castle was the summer residence of Ranjitsinhji, the Maharaja of Nawanagar, and former test cricketer with the English Cricket Team.

The station closed with the line in 1935. The station building has since been renovated and is now a private dwelling.
