= Oughterard railway station =

Disused railway station in County Galway, Ireland

General information
- Location: County Galway; Ireland
- Coordinates: c. 53.4218°N 9.326°W
- Platforms: 2

History
- Original company: Midland Great Western Railway
- Pre-grouping: Great Southern Railways

Key dates
- 1895: Station opens
- 1935: Station closes
Route map
Location

Oughterard railway station was on the Midland Great Western Railway (MGWR) Galway to Clifden railway.

== History ==
The station was the interim terminus on the 49 1/4 miles (79.3 km) line to Clifden, being 16 1/2 miles (26.6 km) from Galway The inaugural train, the 08:00 from Galway on 1 January 1895 arrived at 9:15am, bringing MGWR General Manager Joseph Tatlow and entourage, who retired to an hotel for refreshments. The 9:25am return left Oughterard with a mere seven passengers, part of the reason being New Year's Day was a strict Church holyday.

The station proved useful in bringing tourists and anglers to the Ouhterard area.

The station closed with the line in 1935.
