= Moycullen railway station =

Disused railway station in County Galway, Ireland

General information
- Location: County Galway; Ireland
- Coordinates: c. 53.344°N 9.172°W
- Platforms: 2

History
- Original company: Midland Great Western Railway
- Pre-grouping: Great Southern Railways

Key dates
- 1895: Station opens
- 1935: Station closes
Route map
Location

Moycullen railway station was on the Midland Great Western Railway (MGWR) Galway to Clifden railway.

== History ==
The station was the first on the 49 1/4 miles (79.3 km) line to Clifden, being the first stop and a little under 8 miles (13 km) from Galway. It had two 100 yards (91 m) platforms, 55 yards (50 m) goods platform, and a 90 yards (82 m) cattle loading bank.

The station closed with the line in 1935. While the line has been paved over, several buildings remain but are adapted for private and business usage.
