= Recess railway station =

Disused railway station in Ireland

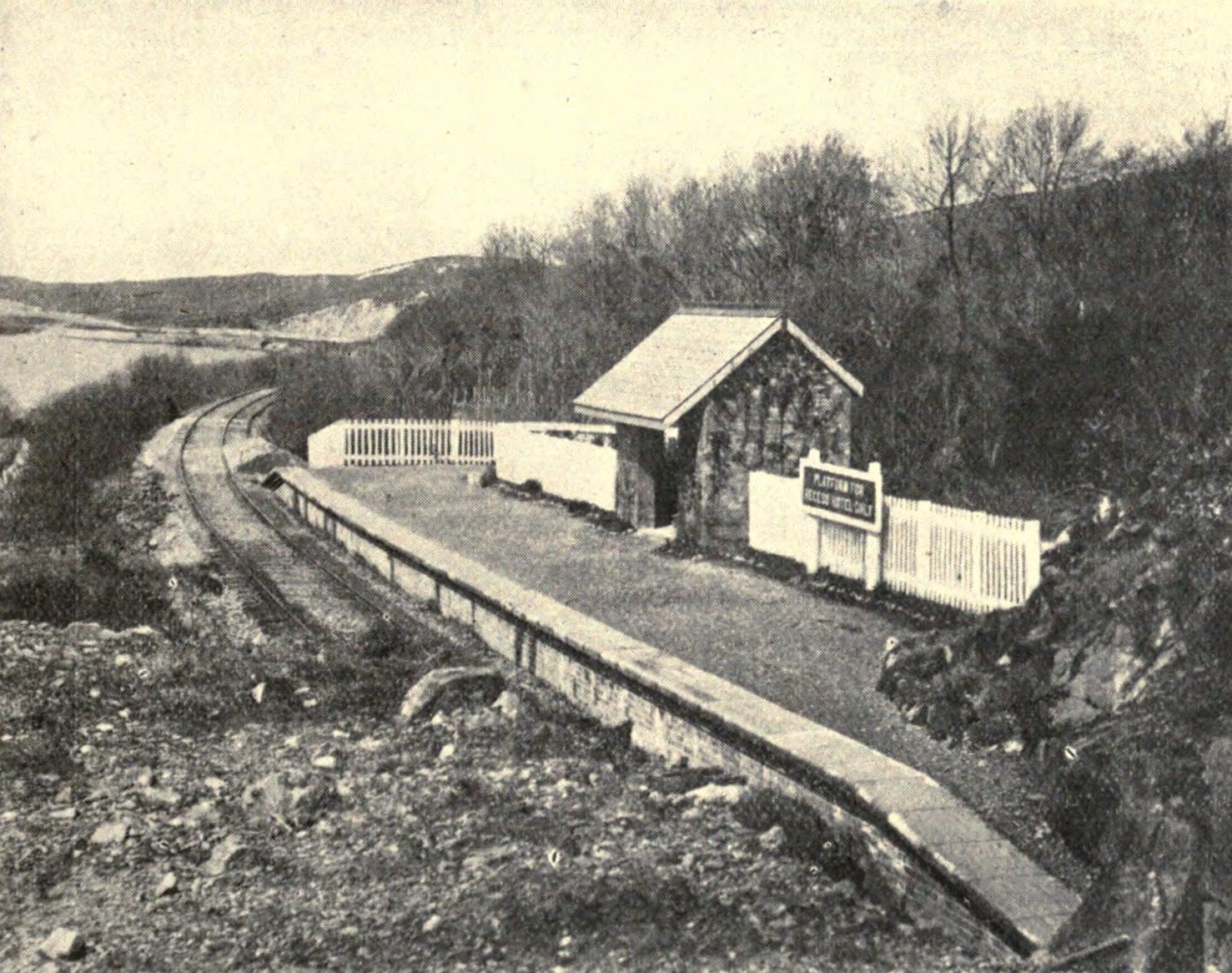
- The Hotel Platform halt in 1906. This was a simple affair two miles east of the more substantial Recess station where trains could pass

General information
- Location: County Galway; Ireland
- Coordinates: 53.4659°N 9.7538°W
- Platforms: 2 (plus one at Hotel)

History
- Original company: Midland Great Western Railway
- Pre-grouping: Great Southern Railways

Key dates
- 1895: Station opens
- 1902: Hotel Platform opens
- 1920: Hotel Platform closes
- 1935: Station closes
Route map
Location

Recess railway station was on the Midland Great Western Railway (MGWR) Clifden branch line from Galway and was situated in the heart of the Connemara tourism area in Ireland.

== History ==
The station was opened in 1895, when services began from Galway, some 35 1/2 miles (57.1 km) distant, when the line fully opened to Clifden from the intermediate terminus at Oughterard. The station served the town of Recess, County Galway, in the heart of the Connemara tourism area. It was situated on Alexander Nimmo's road serving Galway and Clifden (now part of the N59 route.

The station closed with the line in 1935.

=== Hotel Platform ===
The Railway built a hotel at the station at Recess., with a one platform halt specifically for the hotel in 1902 some 2 miles (3.2 km) east of the main Recess station towards Maam Cross and Galway. In 1903 the hotel lunched Edward VII when he visited by motor car from Leanne, the king being escorted by about one hundred farmers mounted mostly bareback on Connemara ponies wearing Buffalo Bill hats and royal colours. The Hotel platform closed in 1920.
