= Ballynahinch, County Galway =

Village in County Galway, Ireland

Ballynahinch Baile na hInse
- Village
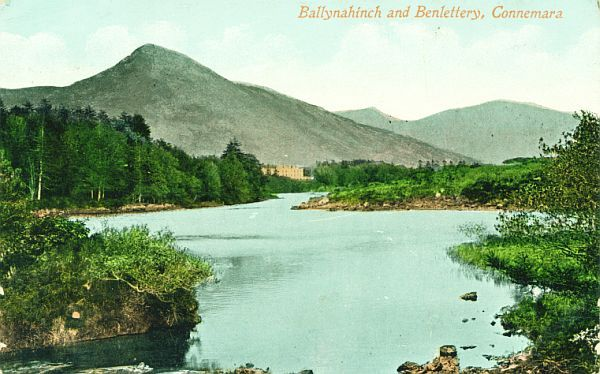
- Area view in 1910s; Ballynahinch castle at base of Benlettery, one of the Twelve Bens

- Location in Ireland
- Coordinates: 53°27′35″N 9°51′49″W
- Country: Ireland
- County: County Galway
- Time zone: UTC+0 (WET)
  - Summer (DST): UTC-1 (IST (WEST))

Ballynahinch or Ballinahinch (Irish: Baile na hInse) is a village in County Galway in the west of Ireland. It is situated close to Recess, on the road from Recess to Roundstone. It also lies on the route of the former railway line from Galway city to Clifden (the "Capital of Connemara"). The name comes from the Irish Baile na hInse meaning settlement of the island.

Ballynahinch Castle, built in 1684 for the Martyn family, is located there. In the early 1900s it was the summer residence of Ranjitsinhji, the Maharaja of Nawanagar, and former test cricketer with the English Cricket Team.

== Transport ==
Ballynahinch railway station opened on 1 November 1895, and was closed on 29 April 1935.

== Connemara Greenway ==
As part of the Wild Atlantic Way development, a 76km Greenway (path used exclusively by pedestrians, cyclists and non-motorised vehicles) is under construction between Galway City and Clifden. The Greenway is being built on the disused railway line between Galway and Clifden. Once completed, the trail will form part of the EuroVelo 1 long distance cycling route from Norway to Portugal. Currently, 6km of the trail has been completed and is open to the public at Ballynahinch. Picnic benches and parking are available at the Connemara Greenway car park.

== See also ==
- List of towns and villages in Ireland
