= Ross railway station =

Disused railway station in Ireland

General information
- Location: County Galway; Ireland
- Coordinates: c. 53.383°N 9.248°W (Note: Co-ordinates are approximate general area and are not the precise location of the station)

History
- Original company: Midland Great Western Railway
- Pre-grouping: Great Southern Railways

Key dates
- 1895: Station opens
- 1935: Station closes
Route map
Location

Ross railway station was on the Midland Great Western Railway (MGWR) Clifden branch line from Galway. It served the Martin family and the people of the wider Rosscahill area.

== History ==
The station was some 12 miles (19 km) distant from Galway. The station served the area of Rosscahill and the Martin family.

The station closed with the line in 1935.
