= Peter Daly =

Peter Daly may refer to:

- Peter Daly (Gaelic footballer) (1940–2022), Offaly
- Peter Daly (Irish republican) (1903–1937), Irish socialist and republican soldier
- Peter Daly (priest) (c. 1788–1868), Irish priest living in Galway
- Peter H. Daly (1941–2017), official in the United States Treasury
- Peter H. Daly (U.S. Navy) (born 1955), United States Navy vice admiral

== See also ==
- Peter Dailey (disambiguation)
- Peter Daley (born 1950), American politician
