= Lough Shindilla =

Freshwater lake in the west of Ireland

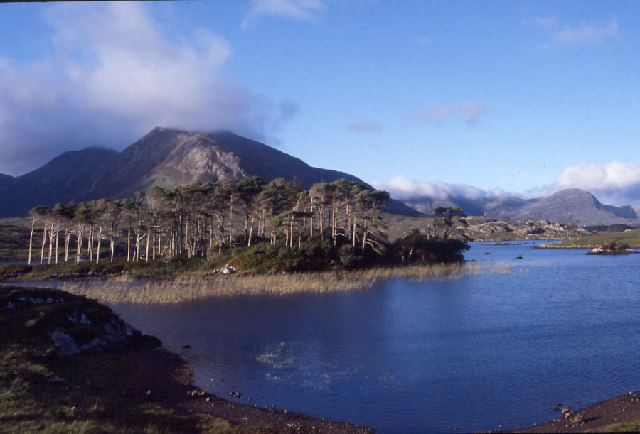

- Location in Ireland
- Location: County Galway
- Coordinates: 53°27′18″N 9°33′40″W
- Primary outflows: Ardderry Lough
- Catchment area: 9.66 km^{2} (3.7 sq mi)
- Basin countries: Ireland
- Max. length: 2.3 km (1.4 mi)
- Max. width: 0.5 km (0.3 mi)
- Surface area: 0.70 km^{2} (0.27 sq mi)
- Max. depth: 22 m (72 ft)
- Surface elevation: 38 m (125 ft)

Lough Shindilla is a freshwater lake in the west of Ireland. It is located in the Connemara area of County Galway.

== Geography ==
Lough Shindilla measures about 2 km (1.2 mi) long and 1 km (0.6 mi) wide. It lies about 40 km (25 mi) northwest of Galway city on the N59 road near the village of Maam Cross.

== Hydrology ==
Lough Shindilla flows east into Ardderry Lough. The lake, like other area lakes, is oligotrophic.

== Natural history ==
Fish species in Lough Shindilla include brown trout, perch, Arctic char, salmon and the critically endangered European eel. Lough Shindilla is part of the Maumturk Mountains Special Area of Conservation.

== See also ==
- List of loughs in Ireland
