= Clifden Castle =

Ruined castellated manor in County Galway, Ireland

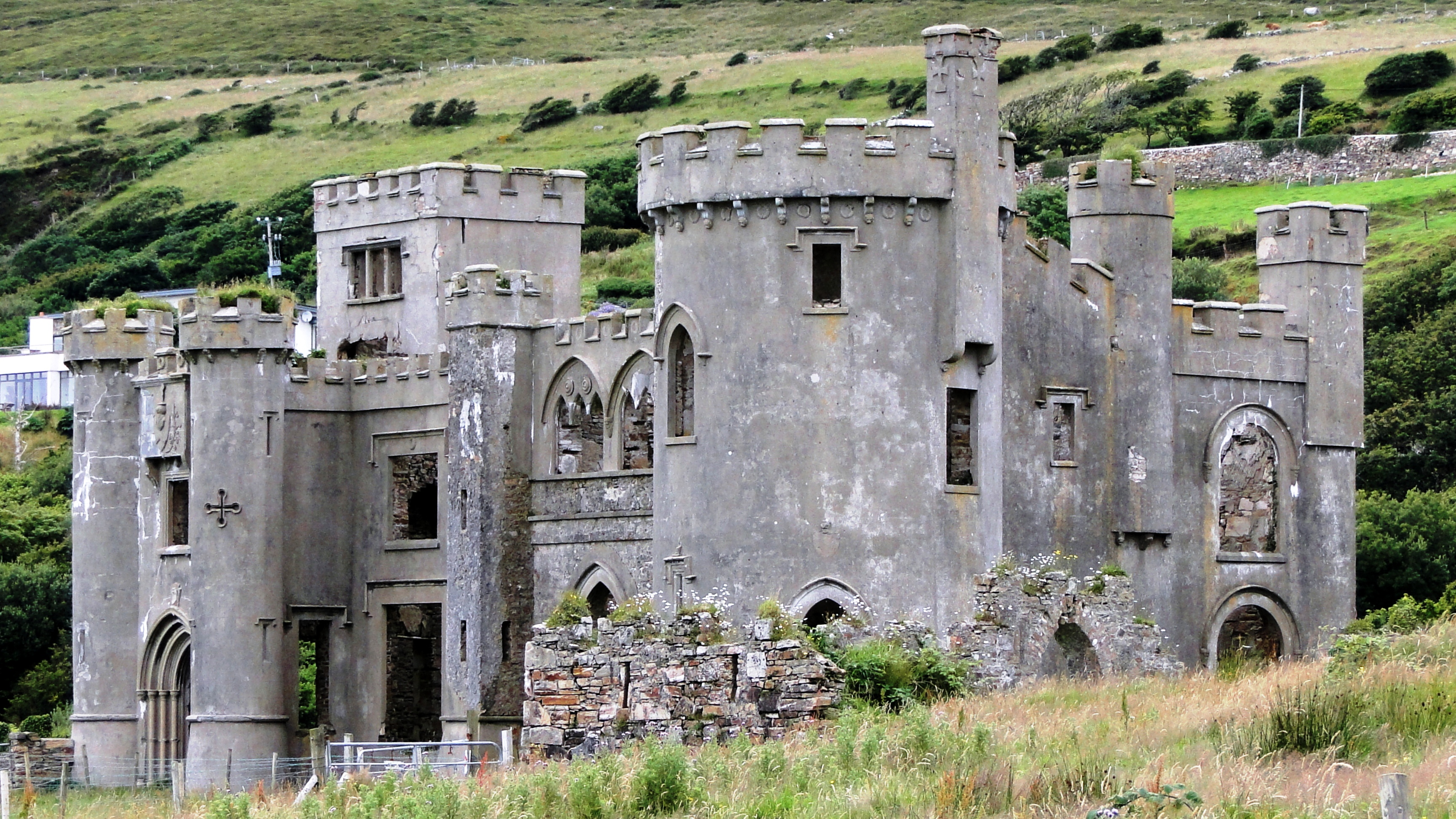
- Clifden Castle

- Location within Ireland

General information
- Location: Clifden, County Galway, Ireland
- Coordinates: 53.4918°N 10.0567°W
- Construction started: c. 1815
- Completed: c. 1818
- Client: John D'Arcy

Clifden Castle is a ruined manor house west of the town of Clifden in the Connemara region of County Galway, Ireland. It was built c. 1818 for John D'Arcy, the local landowner, in the Gothic Revival style. It fell into disrepair after becoming uninhabited in 1894. In 1935, ownership passed to a group of tenants, who were to own it jointly, and it quickly became a ruin.

== History ==
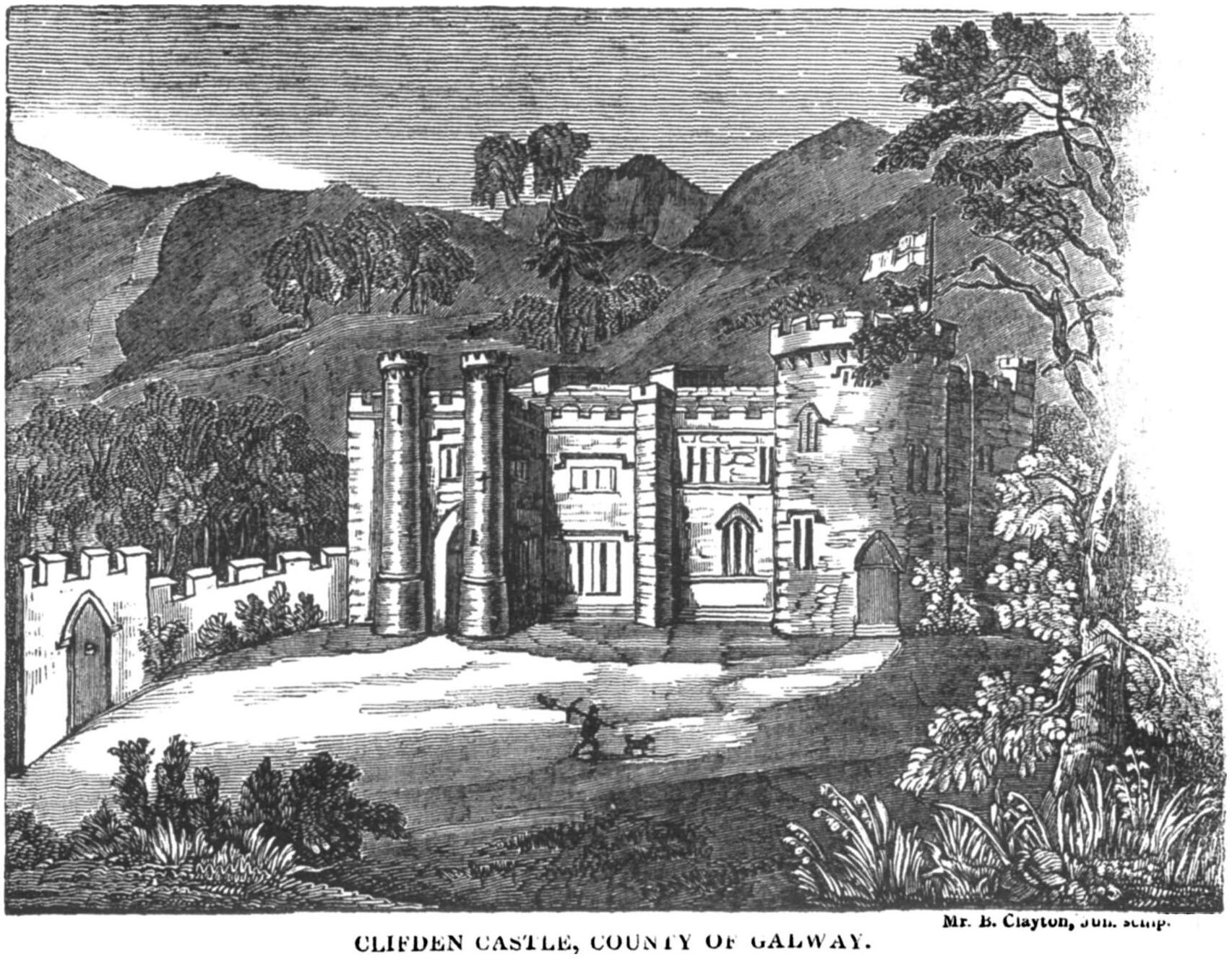
The castle in 1835, Dublin Penny Journal

John D'Arcy (1785–1839), founder of Clifden, had this house constructed for himself and his family even while he was busy building up the town. The Castle dates from around 1818 and served as the main dwelling of the large D'Arcy family for the next decades. The land surrounding it was among the first D’Arcy drained and reclaimed in the Clifden area.

In 1839, John D'Arcy died and his oldest son, Hyacinth, inherited the estate. However, Hyacinth (1806?–1874) was not as adept as his father at running the family properties and at dealing with his tenants. More disastrously, in 1845 the famine struck. Hunger, starvation and fever incapacitated large numbers of people as the potato crop failed. In desperation, many emigrated. As a consequence, the rent income of the D'Arcys plunged. On 21 September 1846, Hyacinth D'Arcy's tenants gathered en masse on his front lawn, begging for work or food.

In the end, the D'Arcy estate went bankrupt and Clifden was one of several D'Arcy properties put up for sale on 18 November 1850. Thomas and Charles Eyre, brothers from Bath, bought the Castle, and most of the town and surrounding lands for 21,245 pounds. They had been the mortgagees of the estate since 1837, shortly before John D'Arcy's death.

The Eyre family used the Castle as a holiday home. In the 1850s, a new roof was added and the facade altered to suit the taste of the new owners. Thomas Eyre eventually bought Charles's share and on 16 July 1864, two years before his own death, gave the Castle and the Clifden estates as a present to his nephew, John Joseph Eyre of Saint John's Wood, London.

The Eyre family were absentee landlords, but used Clifden Castle through John Joseph's death on 15 April 1894. After his death, a trust was set up to administer his estate, which included considerable holdings in Britain and elsewhere. The trust ran the estates and John Joseph's six children and their descendants received the income from them. There was no individual owner of the demesne after 1894, and running the Clifden estate was left to agents. The castle fell into disrepair, the demesne was leased out for grazing to locals as attempts by the agents to sell the property were unsuccessful. All lands except the demesne were eventually purchased by the Congested Districts Board or later the Land Commission.

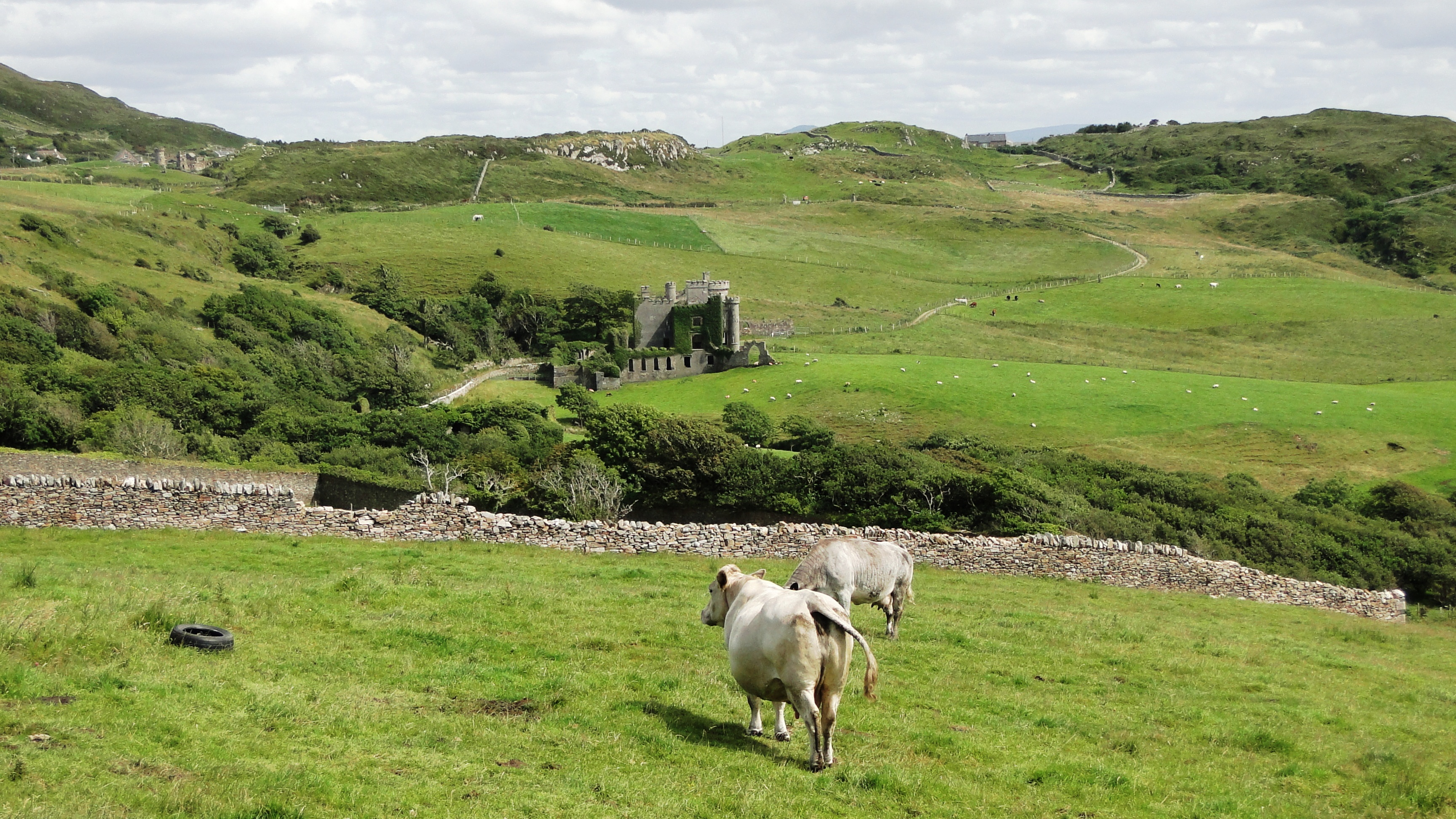
Clifden Castle viewed from the west with the gateway in the background.

In 1917, J.B. Joyce, a local butcher, purchased the castle and its lands. However, this sale resulted in great controversy. The demesne, or castle lands, of Clifton Castle was around 200 acres (81 ha). Numerous former tenants of small scale farms in the area who had purchased their holdings via the Congested Districts Board had coveted the land of the Clifden Demesne to expand their own farms. In 1913, the land was offered to the Congested Districts Board at the price of 2,100 pounds. The farmers were interested in the purchase, but no decision was made. Then in 1917, Joyce bought the land. The local Catholic priest, Canon Patrick McAlpine, started a "severe and sometimes violent" campaign against "the underhanded way" of the purchase. From the pulpit, McAlpine denounced Joyce as a 'land grabber' and said he "had passed the graves of grabbers and within six months he would pass the grave of the Clifden Grabber and there would be six feet of clay over him".

The whole town of Clifden turned against Joyce, although Sinn Féin supported him. Farmers drove Joyce's cattle from his land, put their own stock on his fields and barricaded the gates against him. A town meeting on the issue resulted in a scuffle, stones thrown at the police and injured policemen. Legal action went on until January 1920, when the judge confirmed Joyce's ownership. However, the tenants did not accept that and his cattle were again driven off.

Only after a Sinn Féin arbitration court suggested an agreement in September 1920 did Joyce agree to sell the land. It was purchased for 2,300 pounds plus legal costs plus 150 pounds for damages by trustees who were to set up the 'Clifden Cooperative'. The agreement postulated that the wood and castle were to be 'preserved as the property of the Clifden people'.

The cooperative was established in November 1921. Although it held the official title, in fact the tenants divided up the land among themselves. In May 1935, the Land Commission purchased the land from the Cooperative and passed on ownership of Clifden Castle to the tenants, to be held jointly. The contents of the house had been previously auctioned off, but now the roof, windows, timber and lead were stripped away. Without a roof, Clifden Castle soon fell into ruin.

== Architecture ==
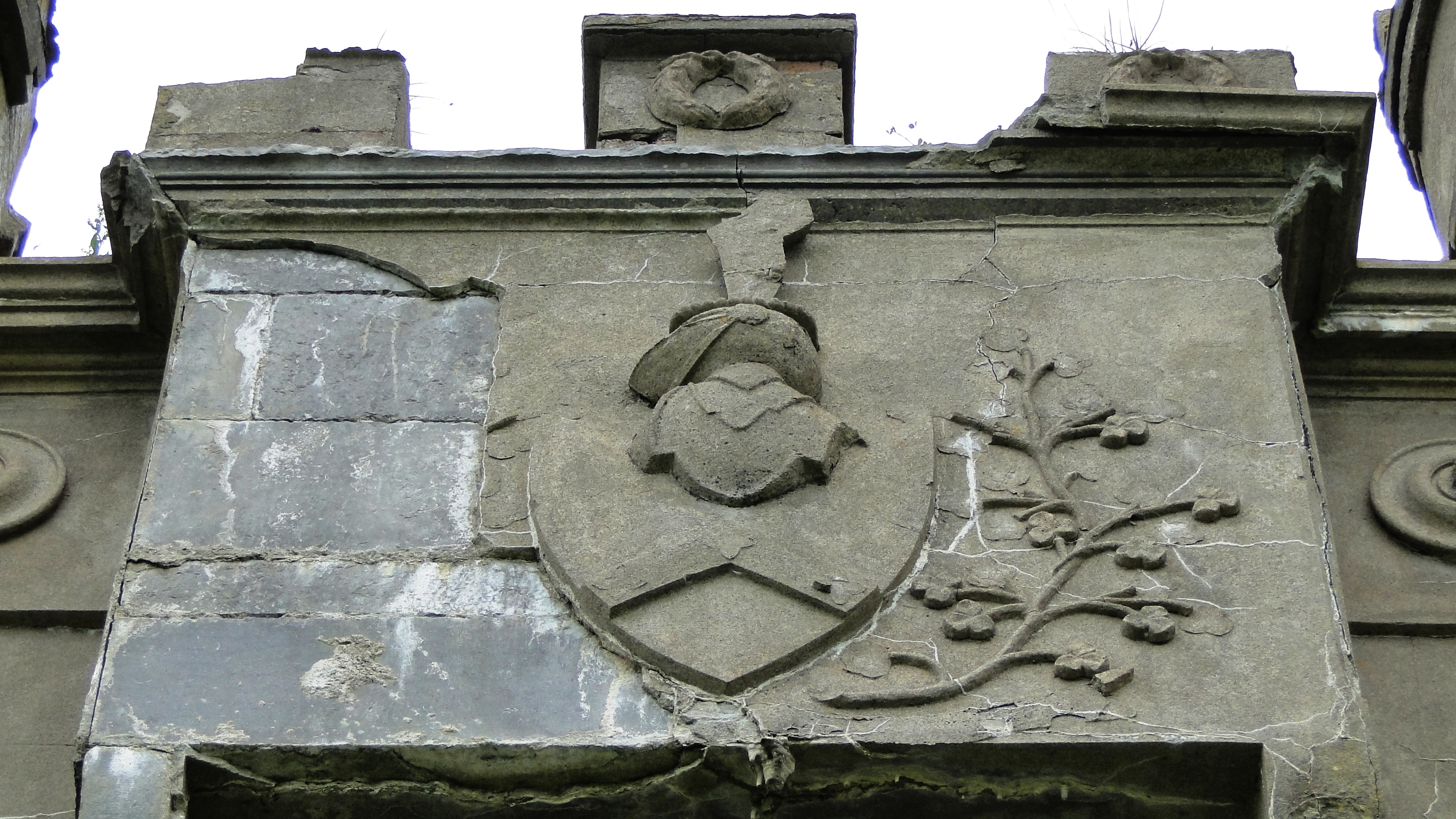
Eyre family crest on the entry tower.

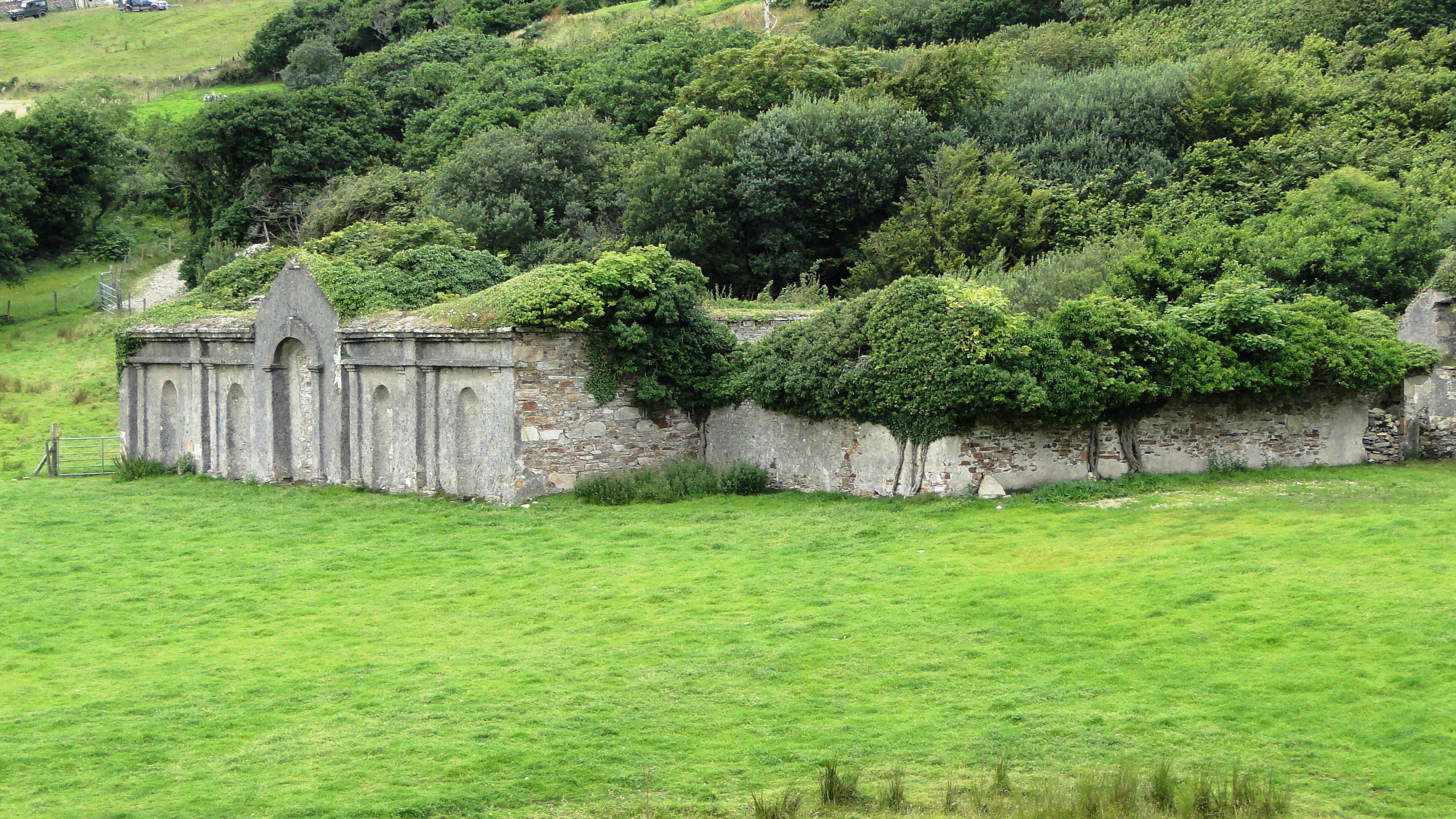
Ruins of the enclosed farmyard.

The estate faces south and overlooks Clifden Bay. It was constructed in the Gothic Revival style, popular in the early 1800s. The castle's original features include a rounded tower to the southeast, a square tower and an entry tower with two round turrets. However, most current decorative features date from the 1850s/1860s and were added by the Eyre family.

The estate also includes a large gateway, built in 1815 in the medieval style. In addition, D'Arcy had several standing stones erected on his property. Four remain along the winding path between the gateway and the house. One of them might be a prehistoric worked stone, originating from elsewhere.

To the west of the castle, a substantial enclosed farmyard was constructed. This comprised a grain store, workers' cottages, stable and coachhouse. Next to it was a walled garden, with a well and pond nearby. On the demesne there are also the remains of a 'marine temple' made of sea shells on the stream to the east of the castle. Close to the road to the north is a children's graveyard, originally for three Eyre children who died in the 1880s.

== Today ==
The former castle and demesne are now owned by several families. The gateway is visible from the Sky Road, and access to the ruined house is through the gateway along a path that meanders across the hillside to the building. The surrounding grassland is populated by grazing cows, sheep and horses, and part of the castle ruins is a cow pen.
