= Marconi Railway =

Railroad

Coordinates: 53.44626°N 10.0249°W

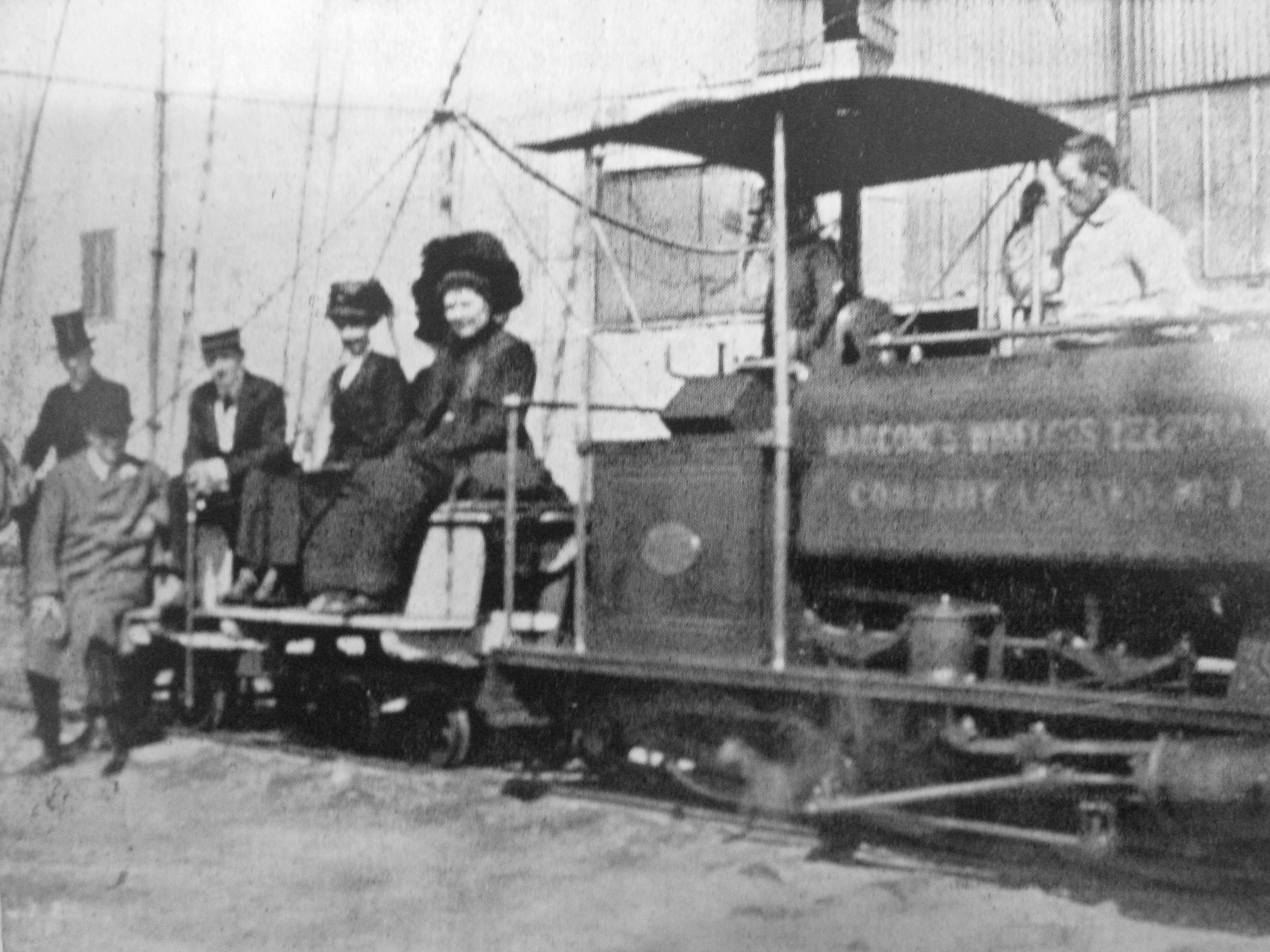
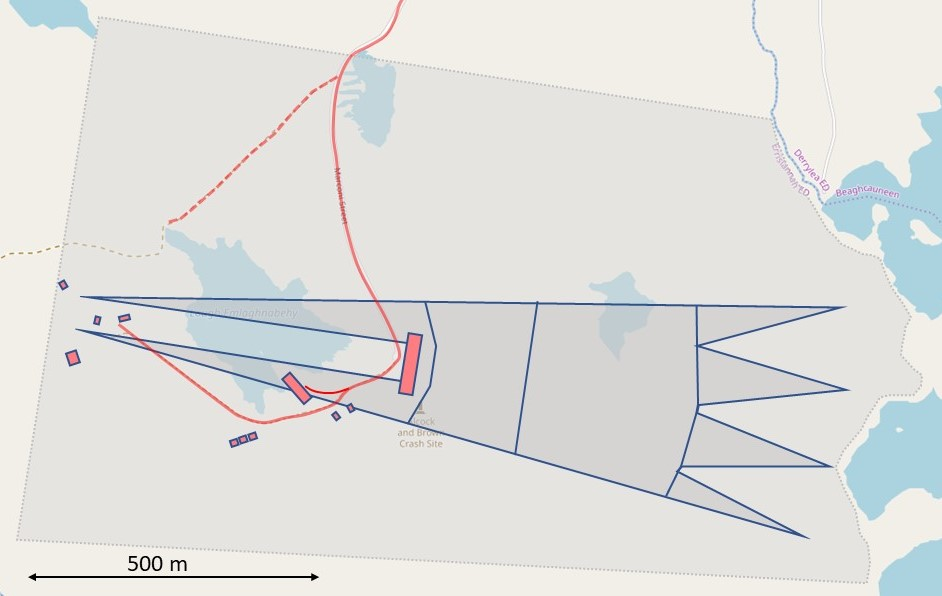
- Visitor shuttle Route of the railway line (red) and Marconi Wireless Station (blue) highlighted on a modern map

Technical
- Line length: 1 1/2 miles (2.4 km)
- Track gauge: 2 feet (610 mm)

The Marconi Railway was a 1 1/2 miles (2.4 km) narrow gauge railway with a gauge of 2 feet (610 mm) at the Marconi Wireless Station near Clifden in the Irish County Galway. It operated from 1907 to 1922.

== Location ==
The route ran from the gate of the site over bog and rocks to the main buildings of the Marconi Wireless Station. There was a turntable at each end of the track, of which ruins are still visible. There were no passing loops on the single-line track. Several manually operated cranes along the route could be used to load the wagons with peat, which was burned as fuel by the on-site power station.

== History ==
=== Construction and inauguration ===
The track and the steam locomotive were designed and built from 1905 to 1907 by Dick, Kerr & Co. in Scotland. Initially it was used to transport construction material and electrical equipment. On 17 October 1907, the first passengers were transported to the Wireless Station. Later it became useful for transporting peat to the power station and for employees and visitors to various points.

In 1919, the pilots John Alcock and Arthur Whitten Brown, who had crash-landed on 14/15 June after the first 16-hour trans Atlantic non-stop flight, drove with the Lancia railcar from the capacitor building to the receiving house and the social club.

=== Closure ===
When the Marconi Wireless Station was burnt down in 1922 due to political unrest, the locomotive and wagons became useless. Subsequently, the railway line was taken out of use, lifted and probably scrapped.

== Gallery ==
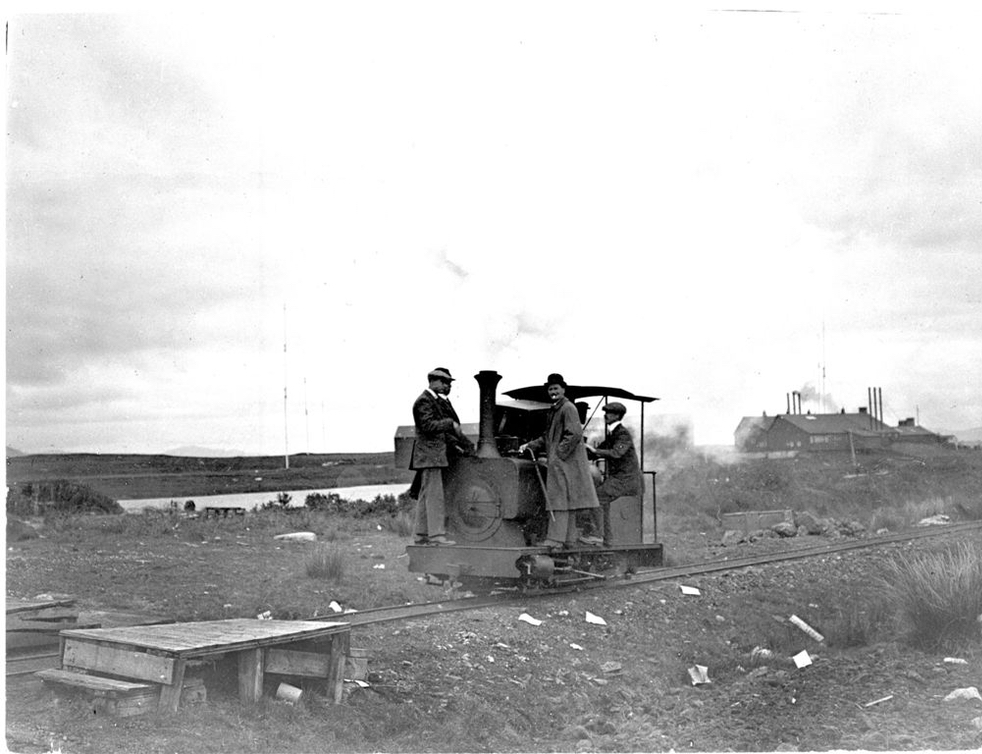
Steam locomotive built by Dick, Kerr & Co.

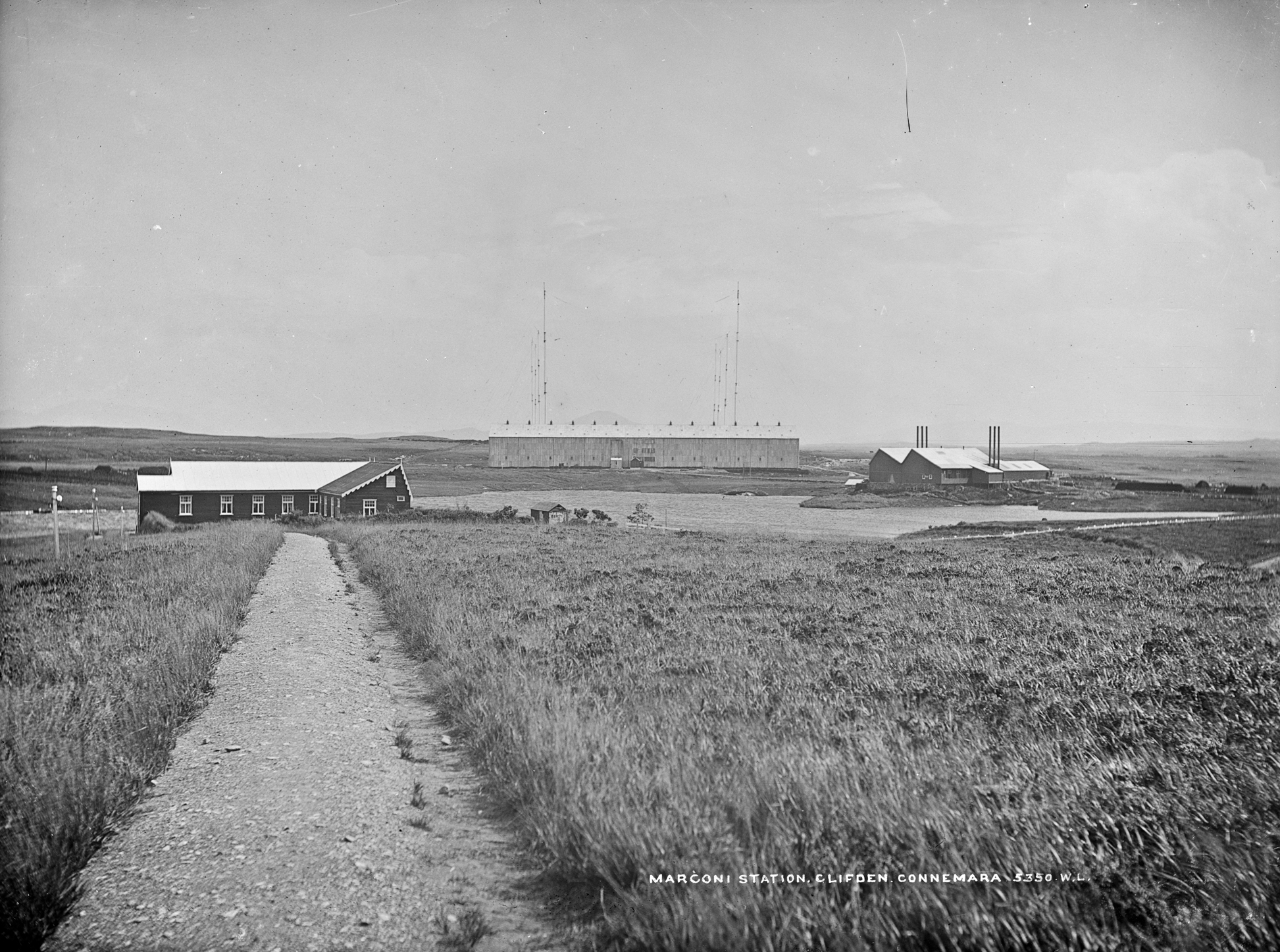
"Marconi Calling"

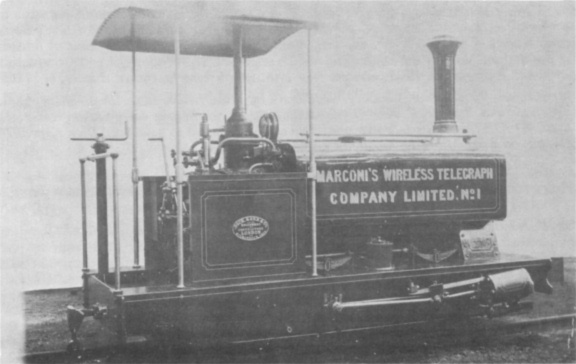
Steam locomotive built by Dick, Kerr & Co.

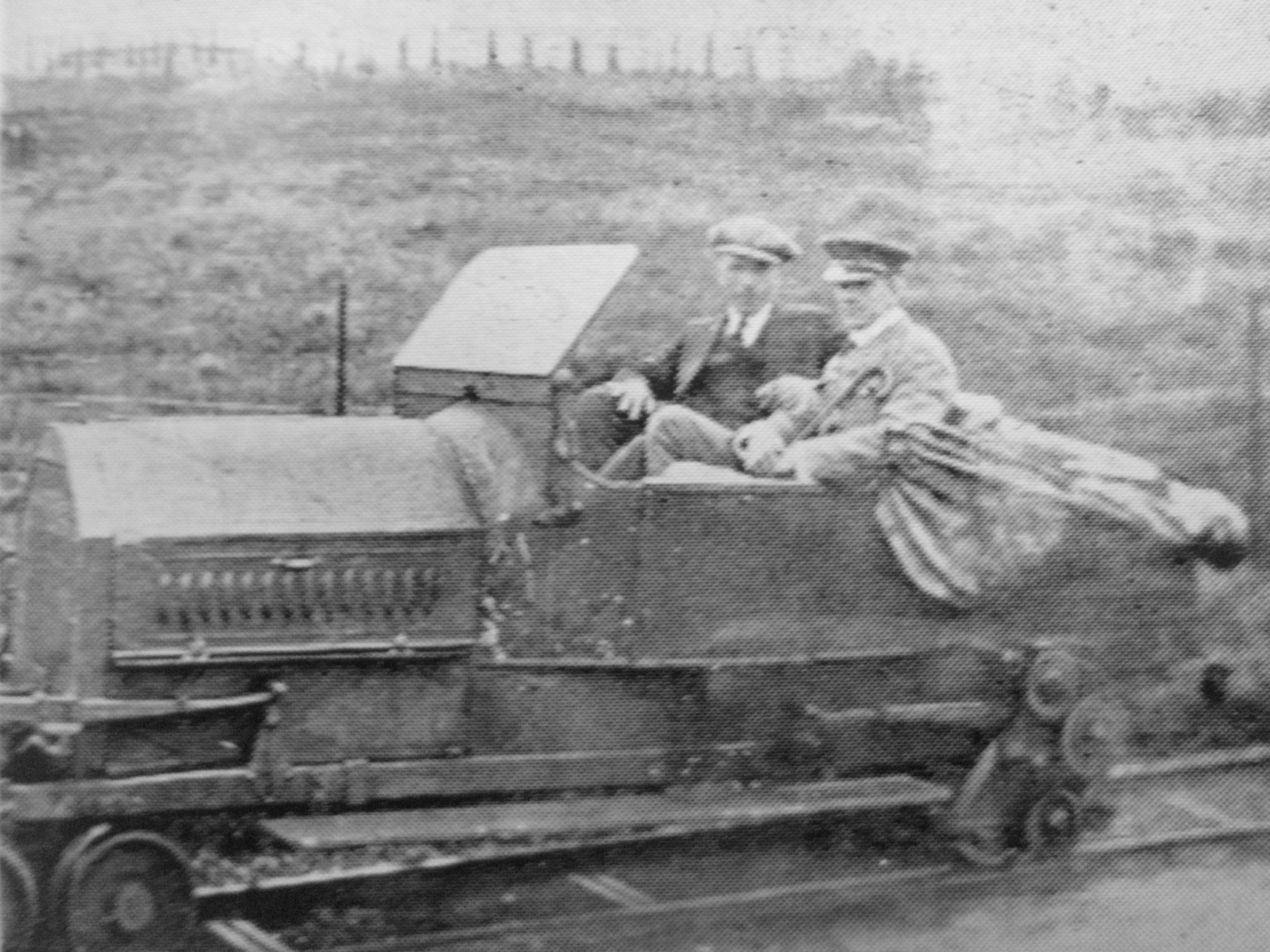
John Alcock and Arthur Whitten Brown in the Lancia railcar

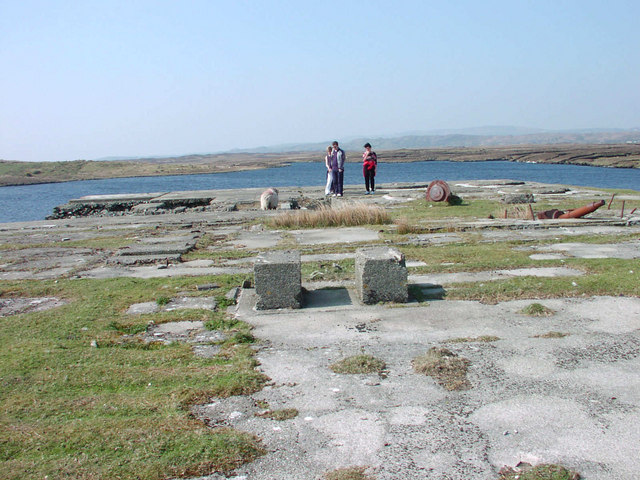
Ruins of Marconi Wireless Station, 2003
