= John Bamlet Smallman =

Irish-Canadian businessman (1849–1916)

- Born: March 9, 1849; Clifden, Ireland
- Died: February 14, 1916 (aged 66); London, Ontario
- Occupation: Businessman

John Bamlet Smallman was an Irish-Canadian businessman (9 March 1849 – 14 February 1916).

== Biography ==
A son of James Knight Smallman and Eliza Switzer, John Bamlet Smallman was born in Clifden, County Galway, Ireland. In the 1850s, the family emigrated to London, Ontario (then London, Canada West, because Ontario had not been formed yet) where his father became a commission merchant.

From age 14 to 21, Smallman worked as a clerk, saving enough money to form a partnership with his fellow Methodist, Lemuel Hill Ingram, a clerk in a local wholesale establishment. They ran a successful business, and in 1882 they were purchasing direct from British suppliers on cash terms. Within ten years trade had increased to $110,000, staff productivity had more than doubled (to $9,200 per clerk), expenses had fallen from 16 to 11 percent of turnover and profits were averaging 10 percent. Smallman and Ingram expanded their business by acquiring new premises in 1892. They purchased adjacent properties and added shoe and toy departments (only to be discarded as insufficiently profitable). Soon an even larger location was secured. By the turn of the century the store employed more than 100 clerks.

Smallman bought Ingram's interest at the latter's death in January 1901, bringing his own nephew and two of Ingram's children into the business. It was incorporated in 1908.

Smallman suffered a nervous breakdown and two strokes. He died on 14 February 1916. His obituary stated that he never mixed in politics, was a member of First Methodist Church and supported the Children’s Aid Society and the Irish Benevolent Society. The bulk of his shares in his business were bequeathed to the Western University of London, Ontario.
