= Peter Dailey =

Peter Dailey may refer to:

- Peter H. Dailey (1930–2018), American advertising executive, media strategist and diplomat
- Peter F. Dailey (1868–1908), American burlesque comedian and singer

== See also ==
- Peter Daly (disambiguation)
- Peter Daley (1950–2022), American politician
