= Ardderry Lough =

Lake in Connemara, Ireland

- Location in Ireland
- Location: County Galway
- Coordinates: 53°27′13″N 9°32′11″W
- Primary inflows: Lough Shindilla
- Catchment area: 14.42 km^{2} (5.6 sq mi)
- Basin countries: Ireland
- Max. length: 3.7 km (2.3 mi)
- Max. width: 0.4 km (0.2 mi)
- Surface area: 0.81 km^{2} (0.31 sq mi)
- Average depth: 4 m (13 ft)
- Max. depth: 12 m (39 ft)
- Surface elevation: 37 m (121 ft)

Ardderry Lough is a freshwater lake in the west of Ireland. It is located in the Connemara area of County Galway.

== Geography ==
Ardderry Lough measures about 4 km (2.5 mi) long and 0.5 km (0.3 mi) wide. It is located about 40 km (25 mi) northwest of Galway city on the N59 road near the village of Maam Cross.

== Natural history ==
Fish species in Ardderry Lough include perch, brown trout and the critically endangered European eel. Ardderry Lough is part of the Connemara Bog Complex Special Area of Conservation.

== See also ==
- List of loughs in Ireland
