= John D'Arcy (landowner) =

Founder of the town of Clifden Ireland

- Born: 1785
- Died: 1839 (aged 53–54)
- Known for: Founder of Clifden

John D'Arcy (1785–1839) was the founder of town of Clifden, recognised as the capital of Connemara, in County Galway, Ireland. He was to reside at the mansion he had built, Clifden Castle.

== Life ==
D'Arcy was descended from the County Galway family, the D’Arcys of Kiltullagh, one of the "Fourteen tribes of Galway". D'Arcy was born in 1785. In 1804 he was to inherit family lands in Connemara, East Galway and Mayo in 1804 from his cousin Patrick. In the same year, on 4 June 1804, he way to marry Frances Blake, and she was to bear him four sons and two daughters.

While the inherited estates were traditionally managed from Kiltulla near Athenry, D'Arcy, with his interest in sailing, seemed to prefer Connemara, and developed ambitions to develop a town at Clifden on the Owenglin River.

D'Arcy was appointed High Sheriff or Galway in 1811 but was to lose the position in the following year due to a controversial release of three Connemara men from Galway prison. This was also to mar his attempt to gain the parliamentary seat for County Galway in 1812; an election he was to unsuccessfully contest on four further occasions.

The date at which D'Arcy could be said to have founded the settlement he named Clifden might be said to be 1812 when he was to be granted patents to hold markets at fairs, this marking the transition from a village to a town. (Note: Beaumont suggests 1809 as the founding date.)

D'Arcy's wife Frances was to die on 15 June 1815; prior to a move to a newly constructed mansion for himself, Clifden Castle. In 1820 D'Arcy married the twenty-one year old Louisa Bagot Sneyd from Dublin, and she was to bear him eight further children.

Clifden grew slowly in the 1810s with there being only one house on the site up to 1815. By 1821 the town had grown to a population of 290 in 46 houses. A government grant in 1822 to relieve poverty in the area and this helped establish the fishing quay. The 1820s saw rapid expansion and by 1831 the census recorded a population of 1,257 in 196 houses, with schools, churches, a brewery and other industries established.

D'Arcy died in 1839, and, while having accomplished much, it had been at the expense of accruing debts against his estate.

== Legacy ==
D'Arcy's chief legacy is the town of Clifden which continued to develop after his death. The debts D'Arcy had accumulated became and a problem with the impact of the famine, forcing his son and heir, Hyacinth, to become bankrupt. In 1850 the D'Arcy estates were disposed by the Encumbered Estates Court, being bought by Thomas and Charles Eyre for £21,245. Clifden Castle was inhabited during the 19th century but became a ruins by the 1910s.

A monument commemorating D'Arcy was built in the 1840s soon after his death on a hill at Cloghaunard to the south of and overlooking Clifden.
