= Maam Cross =

Locale in Connemara, County Galway, Ireland

Maam Cross an Teach Dóite
- Townland
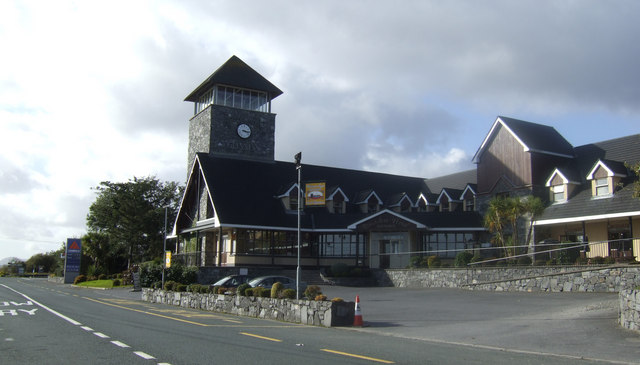
- Hotel in Maam Cross, County Galway

- Location in Ireland
- Coordinates: 53°27′00″N 9°32′00″W
- Country: Ireland
- Province: Connacht
- County: County Galway
- Elevation: 150 m (490 ft)
- Time zone: UTC+0 (WET)
  - Summer (DST): UTC-1 (IST (WEST))
- Irish Grid Reference: L981455

Maam Cross (Irish: an Teach Dóite, meaning 'the burned house') is a crossroads in Connemara, County Galway, Ireland. It lies within the townland of Shindilla, at the junction of the N59 from Galway to Clifden and the R336 from Galway to the Maam Valley which runs from Maum or Maam to Leenaun or Leenane.

Maam Cross station, on the Galway - Clifden line, opened on 1 January 1896. It finally closed on 29 April 1935. The station facilities and a short section of railway line have been restored in a project launched in 2017 and ongoing as of 2022.

The location has a service station and hotel, with dining facilities and a gift shop. It is also home to a weekly agricultural mart, handling sheep, cattle and Connemara ponies.

== See also ==
- List of towns and villages in Ireland
