= Galway to Clifden Railway =

Disused railway line in Ireland

Coordinates: 53.458°N 9.539°W

Clifden branch line
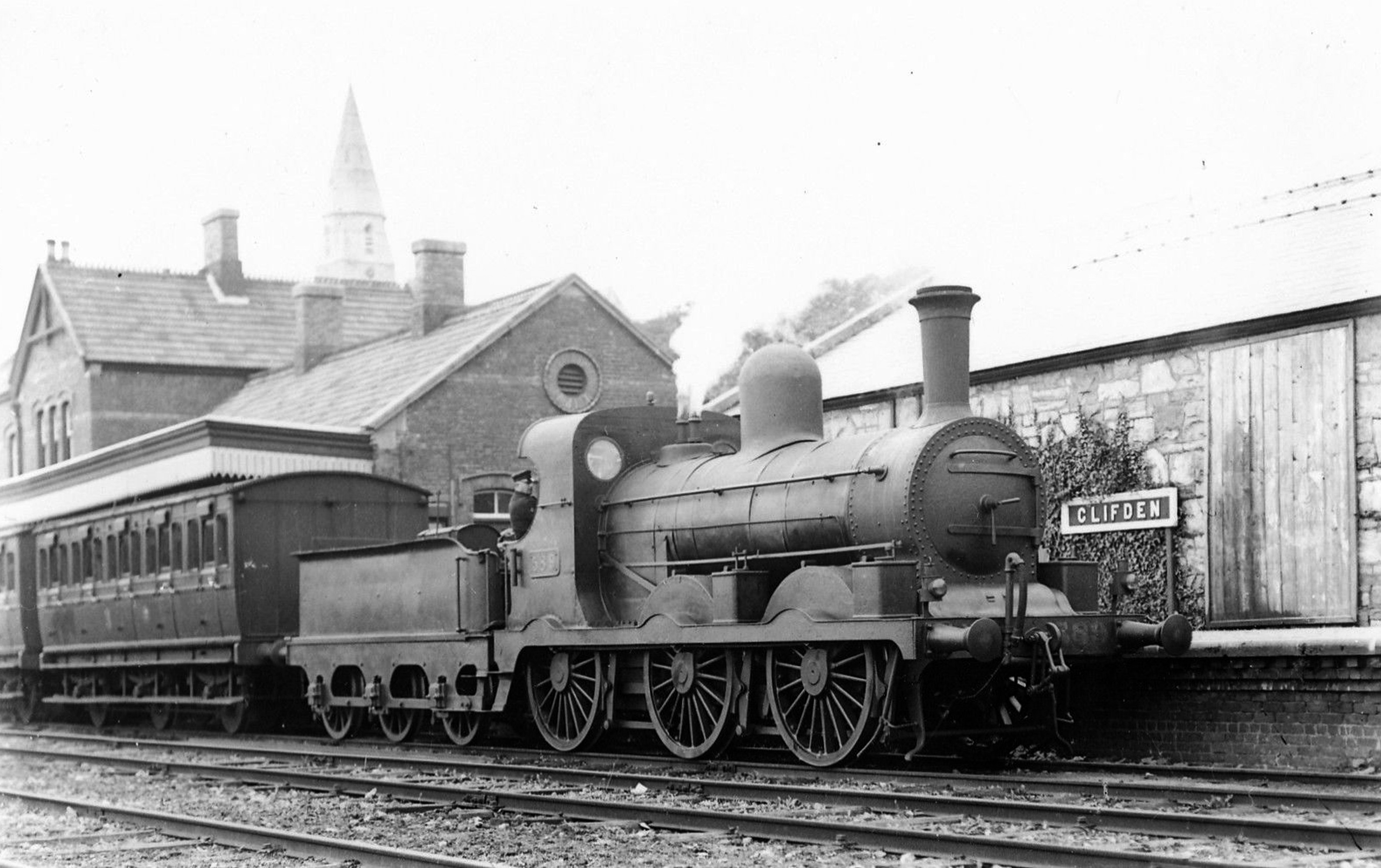
- Clifden station c. 1910

Overview
- Other name: The Connemara Railway
- Status: Ceased operation
- Owner: Midland Great Western Railway; Great Southern Railways
- Locale: County Galway, Ireland
- Termini: Galway; Clifden
- Stations: 8

Service
- Type: Heavy rail
- System: Great Southern Railways
- Operators: Midland Great Western Railway; Great Southern Railways

History
- Opened: 1895
- Closed: 1935

Technical
- Line length: 49 1/4 miles (79.3 km)
- Number of tracks: Single track
- Character: Secondary
- Track gauge: 1,600 mm (5 ft 3 in) Irish gauge
- Electrification: Not electrified

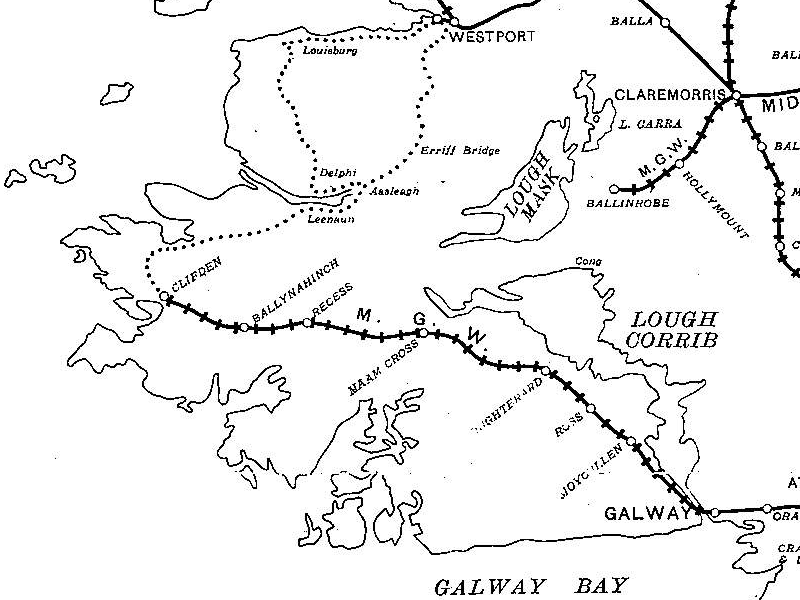
Galway to Clifden Railway 1906 with road connections to Westport

The Galway to Clifden Railway or Connemara Railway was a railway line opened in Ireland by the Midland Great Western Railway (MGWR) in 1895. It led from Galway to Clifden, the chief town of the sparsely populated Connemara region in western County Galway. It was closed by the MGWR's successor, the Great Southern Railways (GSR) in 1935.

== History ==
Initial suggestions for developing the sparsely populated region of Connemara with a railway line go back to the early days of the railways in Ireland when it became foreseeable that the railway network would reach the provincial centre, Galway. The town of Clifden was mainly connected by sea, with a stagecoach and wagons providing limited overland transport links. These connections were completely inadequate, especially in severe winters, and such weather conditions led to crop failures in the 1880s. The impoverishment of the population in Connemara rose dramatically and calls for a rail link as a structural measure were loud, the project even described as "a matter of national importance". However, all initiatives initially failed due to the financial resources.

=== Financing and construction ===
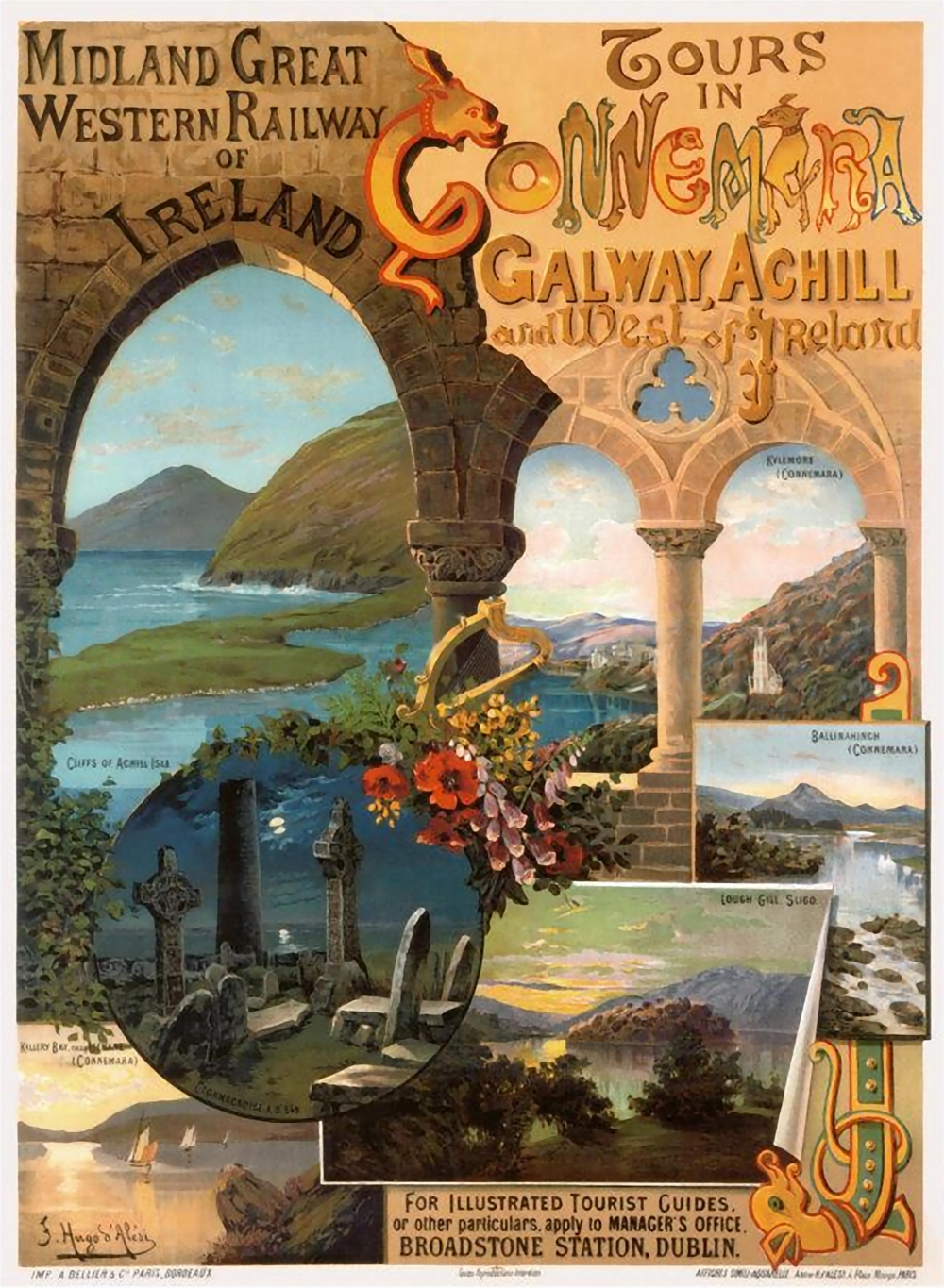
MGWR poster c. 1900

Under Arthur Balfour, the Light Railway Act (Ireland) from 1889 onwards enabled state financial support for railway projects with little prospect of profit and thus the development of the sparsely populated Irish west on a larger scale. For the MGWR this meant the realization of two projects. In addition to the railway to Clifden, this also made it possible to build the route from Westport to Achill Sound in County Mayo, and both routes were subsequently marketed jointly for tourism.

After the decision to build the railway, the route had not yet been finalized. The majority of the population, around 60,000 people, lived along the coast and since there was an urgent need to open up better markets for local fisheries, a coastal route was preferred from Oughterard. For reasons that are not considered to be fully clarified today, however, a route further inland was chosen. The most likely assumption is that the owner of Ballynahinch Castle made a large amount of land available free of charge for the construction of the railway and thus significantly influenced the decision. This variant was shorter, but led through a noticeably less populated area, and because of the swampy subsoil, a more massive substructure had to be built in some sections.

The government approved an amount of £ 246,000 for the Connemara route. Since the construction of the railway was also an emergency measure, every job seeker should be accepted and the first preparatory work began in the winter of 1890/91. Strikes broke out in Clifden for the first time in March 1891. Charles Braddock's contracted construction company accepted all job seekers as requested, but turned out to be a defaulting payer. The further away from Galway, the more irregularly the workers were paid their wages so that further strikes followed. In July 1892, the railway company withdrew the project from Braddock and handed it over to TH Faulkner, under whom the work was now reliably, but no longer as planned in 1893, due to the previous strikes. The further away from Galway, the more irregularly the workers were paid their wages so that further strikes followed. In November 1893, 1,500 workers were employed, not without social tensions with the population, which were often caused by the illegal serving of alcohol on the construction sites.

=== The operation ===
The first section from Galway to Oughterard opened on 1 January 1895. Apart from Joseph Tatlow, General Manager of the MGWR, and guests of honour, there was hardly any audience, since New Year's Day was a strict church holiday and was reserved for attending church services. On 1 July 1895, the remainder of the line to Clifden was put into operation, though the stations at Maam Cross and Ballynahinch where not felt sufficiently completed to be initially opened to the public.

Due to the distance from the coast, the freight traffic did not take on the originally desired extent but brought the developed region the hoped-for reliable connection to the provincial capital Galway and more distant sales markets. This development prompted the railway company to rely heavily on tourist passenger transport. At the end of the 19th century, the wild and romantic loneliness of Connemara was already enjoying a certain popularity as a summer destination with the aristocracy and the upper classes. Starting in 1903, the Midland Great Western Railway ran direct express trains with dining cars from Dublin to Clifden during the summer season, and an upscale hotel was built at Recess station. Motorized cabs developed as a forerunner of later bus routes the line from Clifden to Westport and established a connection with the other branch line of the railway company. Celebrities and members of the aristocracy who owned summer houses in Connemara or came on fishing holidays aroused the interest of the general public in the region as a travel destination.

The First World War, the Irish War of Independence, and the resulting Irish Civil War cut the tourism business. During the civil war, the railway line was badly damaged in several places, which resulted in a shutdown of seven months.

=== Shantalla branch ===
In 1911, a branch line of the railway to a granite quarry in the suburb of Shantalla was constructed, "leading from the present site of the Chapel of St. Columbanus in NUIG, west to the quarry along a route that later became Seamus Quirke Road." Stone was transported from the quarry to the main Galway railway station via the line, and subsequently to the stone works at Fisheries Field, where a lime kiln exists (built around 1820).

=== Closure ===
When the Irish Civil War was over, the already increased competition from road traffic made the railways very difficult. In 1925, the railways in the Irish Free State (the predecessor of today's Irish Republic) were merged under the name Great Southern Railways. The already poor condition of the tracks made a thorough renovation necessary from the 1930s. The modest income of the Connemara line caused the Great Southern Railway to cease operations. On the afternoon of 27 April 1935, the last train left Clifden station; on this journey, all of the wagons that were still in the stations were added to this. The tracks and the steel bridge over the River Corrib were subsequently removed and sold to a German scrap metal company for a mere £10. As a replacement for the railway, the road connection between Galway and Clifden (now the national road N59) was paved and a bus route was set up.

== Route ==
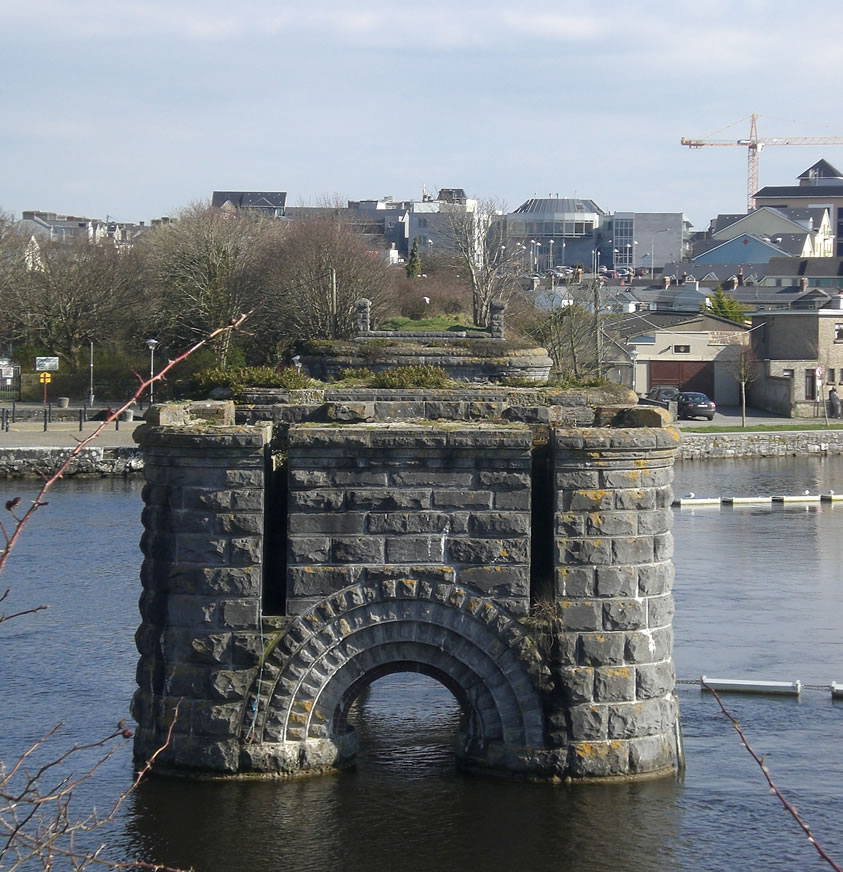
Piers of the bridge over the Corrib in Galway

The Connemara Railway was single-track in the broad gauge of 1,600 millimetres (63 in), or "Irish gauge". The starting point was Galway train station. While still in the city, the route passed under Prospect Hill in the railway's only tunnel, which was actually a covered incision. The railway crossed the River Corrib on the largest bridge structure on the line and left Galway in a north-westerly direction. Following the bank of Lough Corrib via Moycullen and Ross, it first led to Oughterard. From there it went through the sparsely populated heartland of Connemara along the banks of Lough Bofin and Lough Ardderry to Maam Cross, an important intersection with national roads.

On the southern edge of Joyce Country, within sight of the Twelve Bens, it continued through Recess, County Galway, where the railway hotel was,, and Loughs Derryclare and Ballynahinch. After 48.5 miles (78.1 km), the terminus at Clifden was reached. There were a total of 41 bridges and culverts along the route. The stations of Moycullen, Oughterard, Maam Cross and Recess were designed as crossing stations with two platforms. The end of the line at Clifden had a single platform, yard, turntable, goods shed, and a locomotive shed.

== Heritage ==
Although the Connemara Railway was demolished in the 1930s, numerous part of the infrastructure of the railway are still well preserved. While the railway line in the city of Galway is no longer recognizable due to construction activity, the tunnel under Prospect Hill and the pillars of the bridge over the Corrib are still there. From the city limits, the route including numerous bridges and culverts has remained largely unobstructed and can be clearly seen in the landscape. Some sections are used as driveways and access roads. Several of the station buildings that were sold to private buyers still exist; the Clifden train station was integrated into a hotel complex. The locomotive shed now houses a museum, the goods shed was used as a theatre stage and cinema.

=== Railway revival ===
As of July 2020 work at Maam Cross was in progress to set up a heritage railway, to be named the Connemara Railway. The Covid pandemic delayed this plan.
