= Peter Daly (priest) =

Irish priest

Fr. Peter Daly was an Irish priest, c.1788–1868.

== Origins and life ==
Daly is believed to have been native to an area close to Galway City. His brother, Patrick Daly, lived in Newcastle, just outside the city, and his mother was believed to be a Ms. Bermingham. He matriculated at St Patrick's College, Maynooth on 1 September 1812 and was ordained for the wardship of Galway in 1815, being appointed parish priest of St. Nicholas's North in 1818.

During his lifetime he was town commissioner (sometimes serving as chairman), as well as a member of the Lough Corrib Navigation Trustees, a candidate for Bishop of Galway and member of the Gas Board. He attracted a great deal of criticism but also dedicated admirers.
