= Rosscahill =

Village in County Galway, Ireland

Rosscahill Irish: Ros Cathil
- Village
- Location in Ireland
- Coordinates: 53°23′13″N 9°14′49″W
- Country: Ireland
- Province: Connacht
- County: County Galway

Population (2016)
  - Total: 306
- Time zone: UTC+0 (WET)
  - Summer (DST): UTC-1 (IST (WEST))

Rosscahill (Irish: Ros Cathil) is a village in County Galway, Ireland, 18 km north-west of Galway city.

The village is on the N59 road between Galway city and Oughterard. There are several bus services each day to Galway.
