= Connemara Railway =

Heritage railway project in Ireland

- Coordinates: 53.458°N 9.539°W

Commercial operations
- Original gauge: 1,600 mm (5 ft 3 in)

Preserved operations
- Length: c. 800 yards (730 m)
- Preserved gauge: 3 ft (914 mm)

Commercial history
- Opened: 1895

Preservation history
- Headquarters: Maam Cross, County Galway

Website
- www.connemararailway.ie

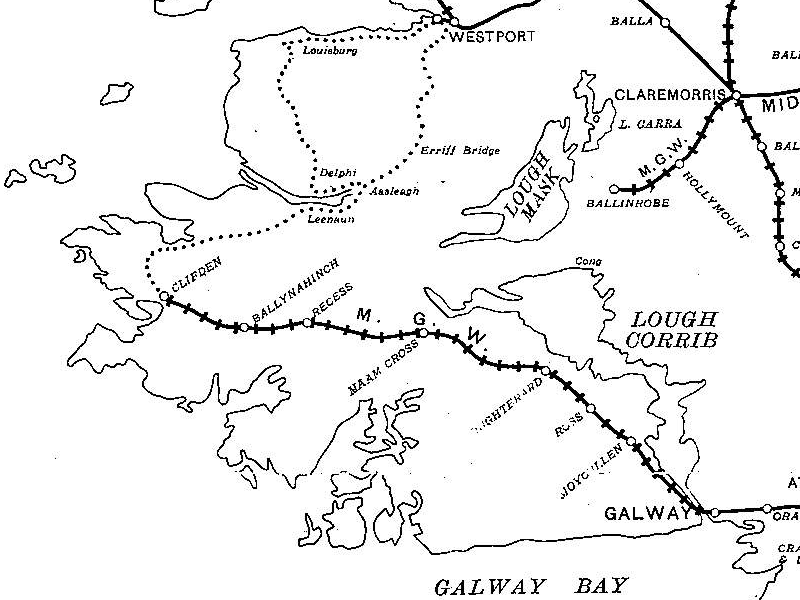
Galway to Clifden Railway 1906 with road connections to Westport. Maam Cross is near the centre of the line

The Connemara Railway is a heritage railway at Maam Cross railway station, County Galway in Ireland. It operates as a short narrow gauge "pop-up" railway, with standard Irish Gauge track available for static exhibits. The railway opened to the public in July 2025, running services on their narrow gauge track.

== Background ==
The Clifden branch line from Galway was opened in 1895, and marketed as a tourist line, closing after 1934. As of May 2021, a project was underway to open an isolated 8 kilometres (5.0 mi) stretch of line around Maam Cross station.

== Project ==
The aim of the project is to get steam trains running on an 8 kilometres (5.0 mi) stretch around Maam Cross, where an all-weather heritage centre is to be set up. Access to the site was gained on 14 February 2017, and the cost of the first phase of the project was expected to be c. €300,000. No MGWR engine was preserved as the hope was to build a new one.

Those involved in the project had planned to get a "pop-up" narrow gauge demonstration train running by September 2020, with a special steam traction event, 125 years after the railway first opened and 85 years since it closed in 1935. However, this plan was impacted by the COVID-19 pandemic.

The next stage was planned to be removal of the narrow gauge 3 ft (914 mm), with standard Irish gauge 5 ft 3 in (1,600 mm) laid instead. The first section of standard gauge was laid in February 2020.

The railway suffered significant storm damage during Storm Éowyn in January 2025, and destruction by accidental fire of their restored signal cabin in December 2025.

== Maam Cross railway station ==
Maam Cross is located at the crossing of the N59 and R336 roads. This station, together with that at Ballynahinch were considered insufficiently completed when the line fully opened on 1 July 1895 and were only opened to the public later. The railway station buildings were completed c. 1896, limestone being found under the peat when digging the foundations. The buildings remaining were a water tower, gatekeepers hut, goods shed and platforms.

The station is sometimes claimed to be a filming location for the 1952 film, The Quiet Man. However, while it may have been initially chosen as a location for the station in the film, it was ultimately rejected in favour of Ballyglunin. The nearby White O'Morn Cottage at Maam was, however, used as a film location.

== Rolling stock ==
The Connemara railway owns a number of pieces of rolling stock of both 3ft and 5ft3in gauge. In 3ft the railway has 2 coaches and 2 locomotives. On 5ft3in the railway has 4 coaches and a number of goods wagons.

=== 3ft stock ===
The railway owns 2 xBord Na Mona locomotives. LM194 and LM284. LM194 has been repainted in a red livery, while KM284 retains it's Bord Na Mona livery. The line also has 2 coaches fitted with limited seating, one of which has a small space for the guard.

=== 5ft 3in stock ===
==== Multiple units ====
The railway holds the sole preserved member of the Irish Rail 2700 class, single car unit 2751. This unit is in working condition.

==== Coaches ====
The line has 4 coaches of a range of vintages.

The oldest of these is GS&WR no.813 built in 1903, withdrawn from CIE in the 1970s and stored by the RPSI in Mullingar shed and was brought to the railway in August 2022.

Two of the coaches are of a 'laminate' basis, 2421 and 1916. 2421 was built as a dining vehicle by CIE in 1956, withdrawn from CIE in 1985 and was used by the RPSI from 1995 until 2010 when it was then stored. 1916 was built in 1956, originally as suburban composite carriage 2168, in 1972 being rebuilt into a brake standard and renumbered to 1916. It was withdrawn in 1986, and was preserved by the RPSI being used until 2010 when it was also stored. The two coaches were repainted by Irish Rail into CIE Black and Tan and passed to the railway in May 2023.

The newest coach is a MK3 sleeper 10598 built in the mid 1983 for British Rail, being used until 2019 by Caledonian sleeper. In April 2023 it was moved to Maam Cross as use for volunteer accommodation.

==== Goods wagons ====
The railway owns a number of goods wagons, including 3 ballast wagons, a plough van, 2 tankers and a well wagon.

Number	Type	Current status	Notes
Ballast Wagons
24853	Ballast Plough	Stored	Previously stored in North Wall yard, where it was the victim of an arson attack.
24143	Ballast Wagon	Stored	Previously stored in North Wall yard.
24250	Ballast Wagon	Stored	Previously stored in North Wall yard.
24256	Ballast Wagon	Stored	Previously stored in North Wall yard.
12052	Bullied Beet	Stored	Previously stored outside Halfway
649A	Well Wagon	Stored	Previously stored in Waterford Sallypark yard, moved October 2022
607A	2 Axle Tank Wagon	Stored	Previously Stored in Inchicore Works
633A	2 Axle Tank Wagon	Stored	Previously Stored in Inchicore Works

== See also ==
- List of heritage railways in the Republic of Ireland
