= Clifden railway station =

Former railway station in County Galway, Ireland

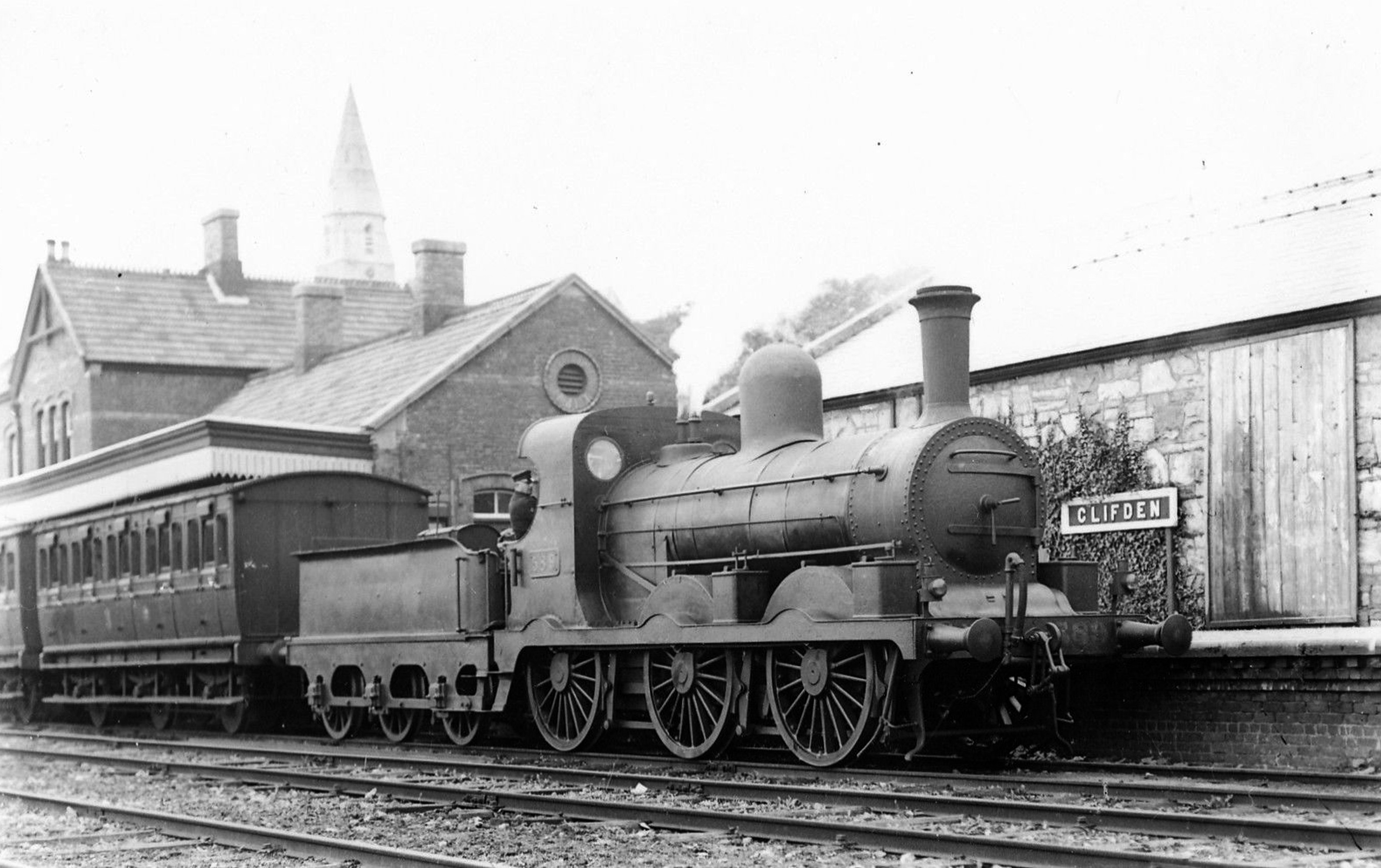
- Clifden station c. 1910

General information
- Location: Clifden; County Galway; Ireland
- Coordinates: 53.4885°N 10.0177°W
- Elevation: 19 metres (62 ft)
- Platforms: 1

History
- Opened: 1 August 1895 (131 years ago)
- Closed: 1935 (91 years ago)
- Original company: Midland Great Western Railway
- Pre-grouping: Great Southern Railways
Route map
Location

Clifden railway station was a station serving the town of Clifden, County Galway, Ireland. Opened in 1895, it was the terminus on the Midland Great Western Railway (MGWR) Clifden branch line from Galway. It closed in 1935.

== History ==
The station was the terminus on the Clifden branch line from Galway some 49 1/4 miles (79.3 km) distant. An inspection train of directors reached the station on 3 May 1895, with the public opening on 1 July 1895.

When the last train pulled out of Clifden in 1935 with the closure of the railway it left with whistle blowing and detonators set at the level crossing. The station building has since been renovated and is now a hotel and theatre. The station master's house is now a Museum.
