= Clifden =

Town in County Galway, Ireland

Clifden An Clochán
- Town
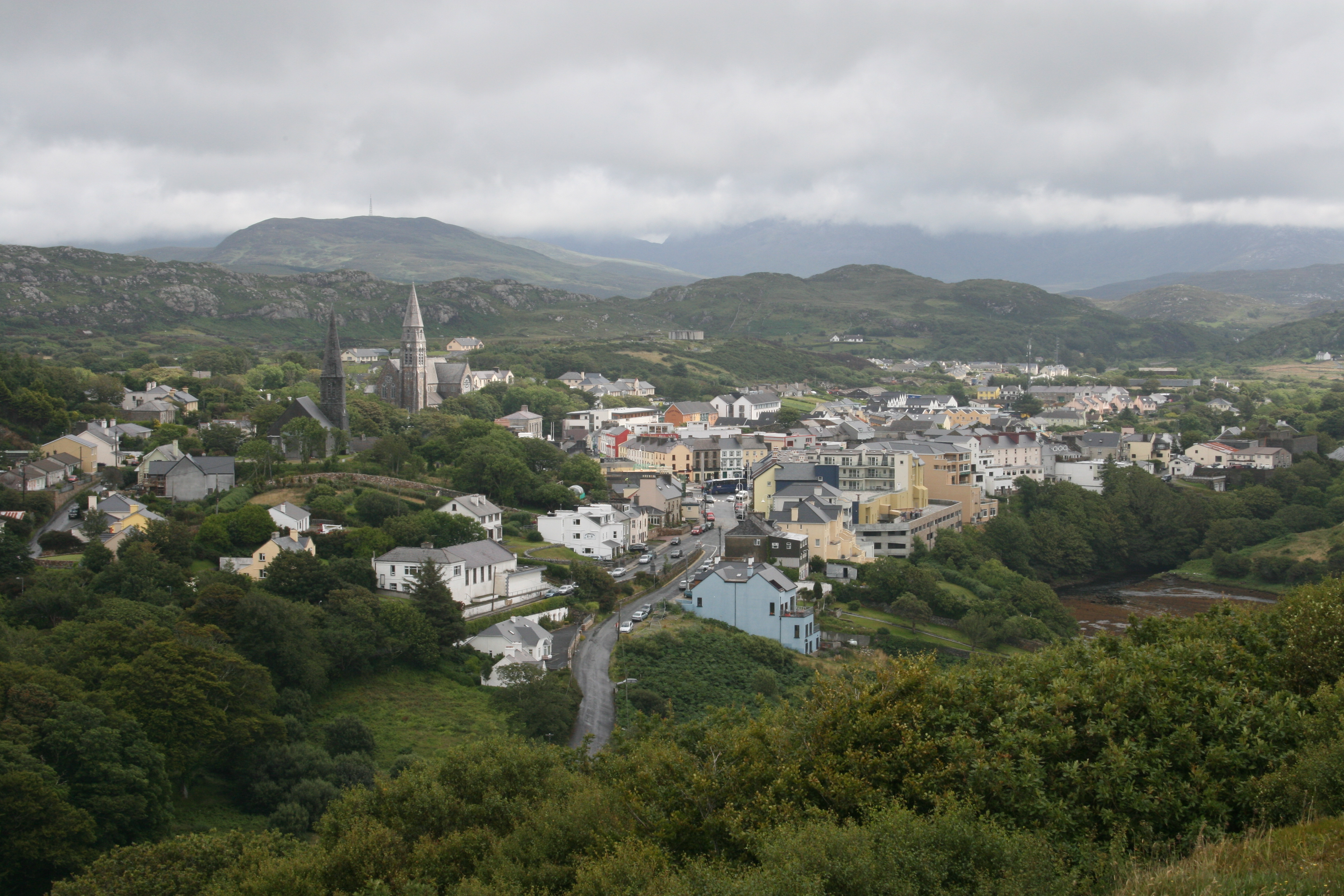
- View from John D'Arcy Monument on the Sky Road

- Location in Ireland
- Coordinates: 53.489°N 10.021°W
- Country: Ireland
- Province: Connacht
- County: County Galway
- Elevation: 50 m (160 ft)

Population (2022)
  - Total: 1,259
- Irish Grid Reference: L655510

Clifden (Irish: An Clochán, meaning 'stepping stones') is a coastal town in County Galway, Ireland, in the region of Connemara, located on the Owenglin River where it flows into Clifden Bay. As the largest town in the region, it is often referred to as "the Capital of Connemara". Frequented by tourists, Clifden is linked to Galway city by the N59.

== History ==
=== 19th century ===
The town was founded at the start of the 19th century by John D'Arcy who lived in Clifden Castle (built around 1818, now a ruin) west of Clifden. He had inherited the estate in 1804 when it was mostly inhabited by fishermen and farmers. The idea of establishing a town on the coast was first voiced by him in 1812. Bad communications and a lack of private capital prevented fast progress until the 1820s when the potato crop failed in 1821–22 and D'Arcy petitioned the government in Dublin for assistance. The engineer Alexander Nimmo was sent to the area in 1822. He constructed a quay at Clifden (finished in 1831) and started a road to Galway. With these improvements to its infrastructure, the town began to grow.

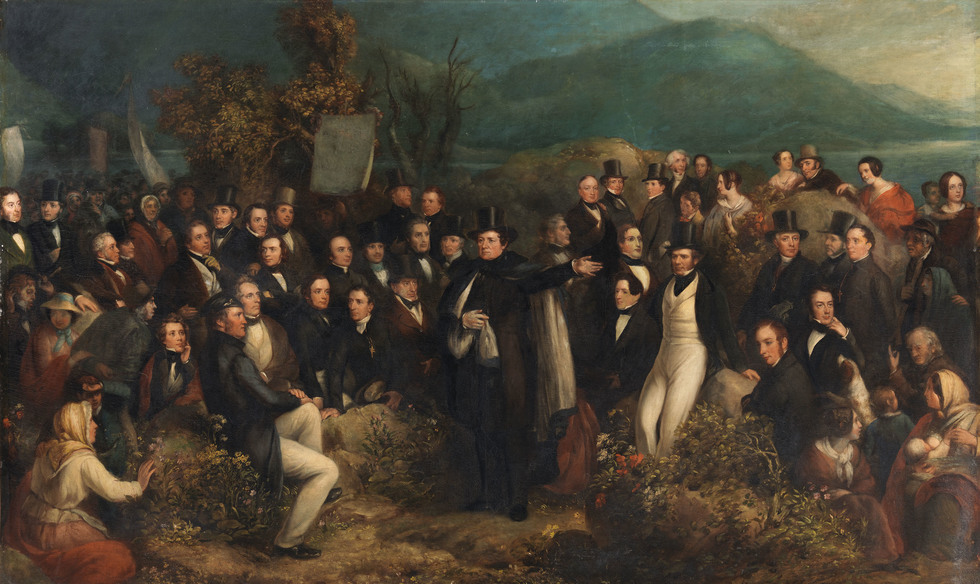
The Monster Meeting at Clifden in 1843 by Joseph Patrick Haverty. Daniel O'Connell is depicted in the centre addressing the gathered masses.

It prospered until, in 1839, John D'Arcy died. By that time, Clifden had grown from virtually nothing to a town of 185 dwellings, most of them three-floored, two churches, two hotels, three schools, a police barracks, courthouse, a jail, a distillery and 23 pubs. The population had grown to 1,100 and the town already sported the (as yet unpaved) triangle of streets still visible today. Products that were shipped out from Clifden Harbour included marble, corn, fish and kelp. However, John's son and heir, Hyacinth, lacked his father's abilities and confrontations with his tenants became commonplace. In 1843, Daniel O'Connell held a 'Monster Meeting' at Clifden, attended by a crowd reportedly numbering 100,000, at which he spoke on repeal of the Act of Union.

The town's surging growth and prosperity came to an end when the famine started in 1845. Large numbers of people died, as government help proved insufficient to deal with starvation, scurvy and other diseases. By 1848 90% of the population was on relief (receiving government money). Landlords went bankrupt as rents dried up. Many people emigrated to America. On 18 November 1850, Hyacinth D'Arcy put up his estates for sale and most of them were purchased by Charles and Thomas Eyre of Somerset. Hyacinth pursued a church career and became Rector of Omey and Clifden. Charles Eyre sold his share to his brother, who gave the estates to his nephew (Charles' son) John Joseph in 1864.

From 1848, the evangelical Protestant Irish Church Missions were actively proselytising, seeking to convert Catholics. In 1852, their first mission church was established at Moyard Bridge, Ballinakill, Clifden, also the ICM set up orphanages, Glenowen for girls and Ballyconree for boys (opened in 1849), in Clifden, Ballyconree was burnt down in 1922. The mission in Clifden was supported by Hyacinth D'Arcy, the landlord of Clifden Castle, and, following his bankruptcy, by the Eyre family who bought the estate.

In 1855, Sisters of Mercy from Galway came to Clifden and established St Joseph's Convent, followed by an orphanage and St Joseph's Industrial School in 1858.

=== Early 20th century ===
==== Wireless telegraphy and transatlantic flight ====
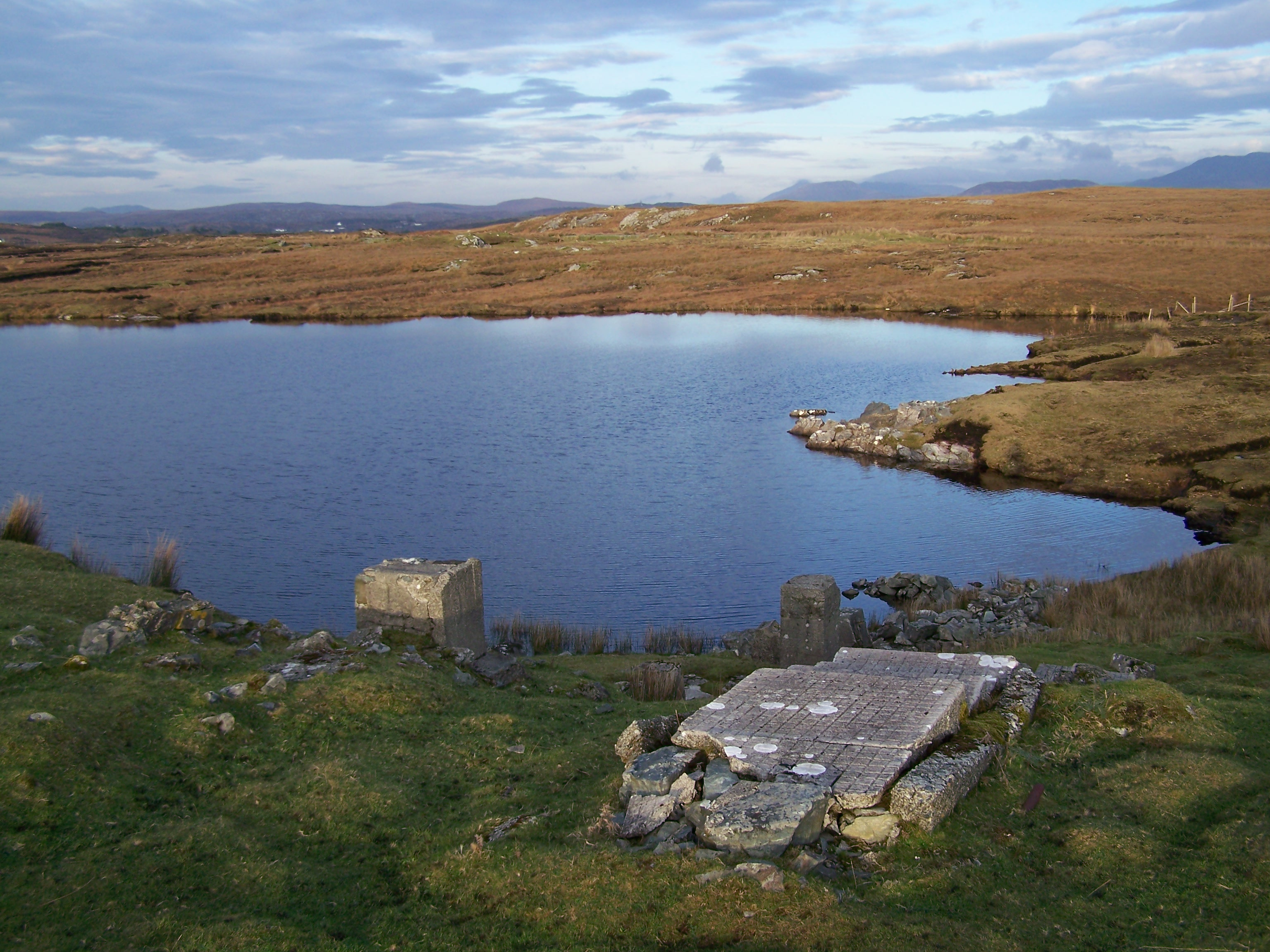
Remains of the Marconi transatlantic wireless station

Clifden gained prominence after 1905 when Guglielmo Marconi decided to build his first high power transatlantic long wave wireless telegraphy station four miles (6 km) south of the town to minimize the distance to its sister station in Glace Bay, Nova Scotia. The first point-to-point fixed wireless service connecting Europe with North America opened for public service with the transmission of 10,000 words on 17 October 1907. At peak times, up to 200 people were employed by the Clifden wireless station, among them Jack Phillips, who later perished as Chief Radio Operator on the Titanic.

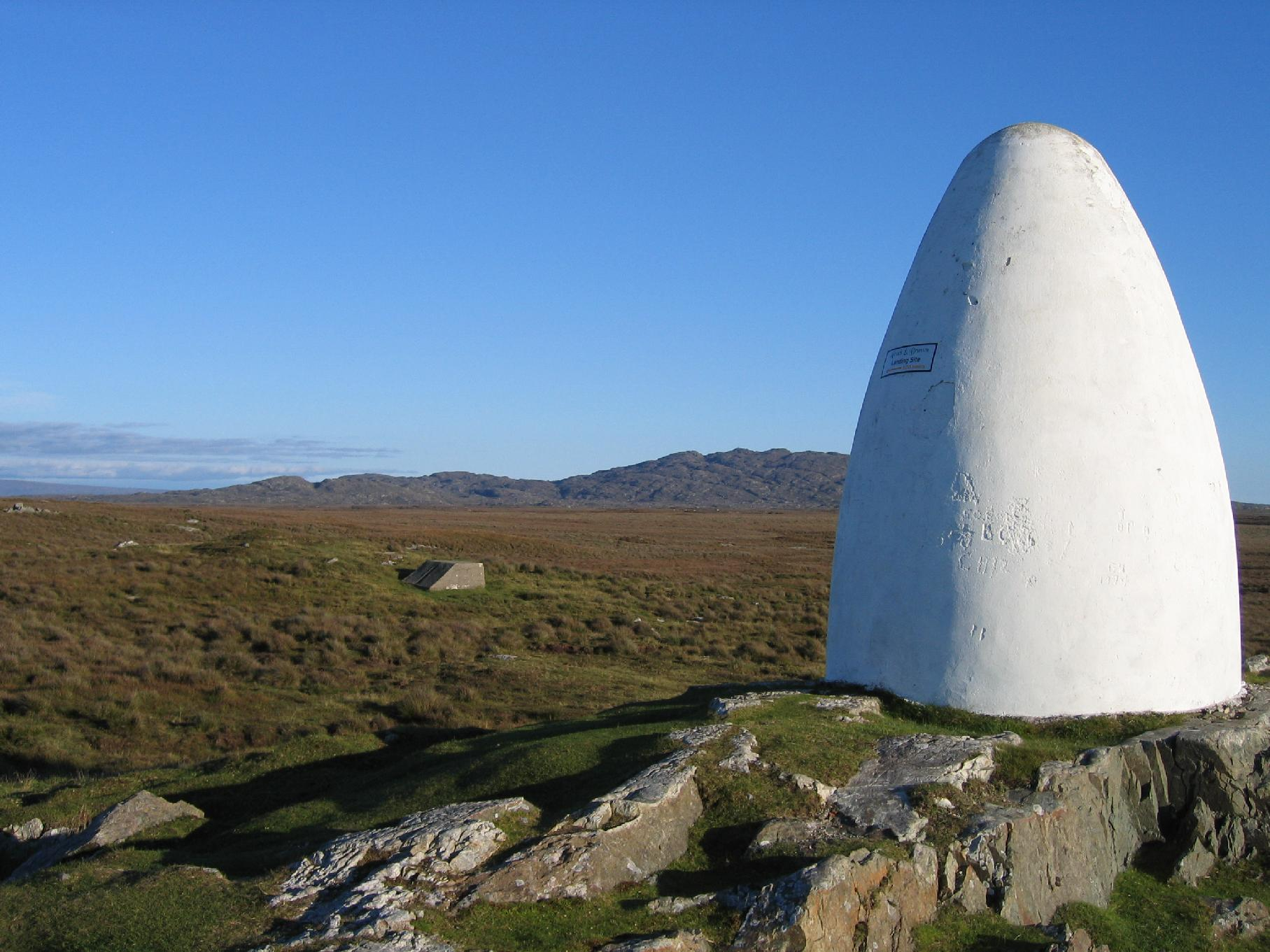
Alcock and Brown landing site

On 15 June 1919 the first non-stop transatlantic flight by Alcock and Brown crashlanded in Derrygimlagh bog, close to Marconi's transatlantic wireless station. When Captain Alcock spotted the green bog he thought it was a meadow where he could safely land his Vickers Vimy biplane. The aircraft's landing gear sank into the soft bog and was destroyed. Alcock and Brown were later transported back to Clifden town by stagecoach with only minor injuries. When they returned using the Marconi Railway, the locals had helped themselves to parts of the aircraft as souvenirs.

==== War of Independence (1920–1921) ====
Events that would lead up to the "Burning of Clifden" began on 21 November 1920, Bloody Sunday. On that day, an IRA unit known as The Squad shot a number of British officers and civilians believed to work for military intelligence unit known as the Cairo Gang, killing eleven and wounding four. Later that day, British paramilitaries from the Auxiliary Division opened fire during what was intended to be a routine search for IRA suspects during a Gaelic football match at Croke Park, killing twelve and injuring sixty. Thomas Whelan, born in 1899 in Clifden, was arrested and charged with the Bloody Sunday assassination of British military prosecutor Captain G.T. Bagelly. Although Whelan recognised the court, pled not guilty, introduced witnesses attesting to his presence elsewhere, and maintained that he was not involved in the assassination, he was found guilty and hanged on 14 March 1921. Following its two for one policy that required the killing of two members of the Royal Irish Constabulary (RIC) for every Republican executed, the West Connemara flying column of the IRA fatally shot RIC Constables Charles Reynolds and Thomas Sweeney at Eddie King's Corner on 16 March 1921. In response to the RIC's request for assistance through the Marconi wireless station, a trainload of Black and Tans arrived via the Galway to Clifden railway in the early hours of St Patrick's Day, 17 March 1921, and proceeded to "burn, plunder and murder". They killed one civilian, seriously injured another, burned 14 houses, and damaged several others.

==== Civil war (1922) ====
When the Civil War started in June 1922, Connemara was controlled by the Republican Anti-Treaty IRA. In Clifden, the population tolerated the Republicans but did not support them. The Republicans occupied several buildings. In addition, all petrol was confiscated, roads barricaded and made impassable, railway bridges were blown up and telegraph lines cut. Newspapers were forbidden.

The Republicans also burned the buildings they evacuated. In Clifden, the workhouse was burned in July. In addition, on 25 July, the Republicans set fire to the Marconi Station and fired shots at it because they considered the station "a British concern", and because the RIC had used the station to marshall reinforcements in March 1921. Transatlantic wireless service was transferred from Clifden to the more modern Marconi wireless station near Waunfawr, Wales. By one reckoning, the station's closure caused an estimated 1,000 local people to lose their livelihood.

The National Army sent 150 men who, in the night of 14/15 August, marched to town. However, the Republicans retreated and there was only minimal fighting. The National troops were warmly welcomed by the people of Clifden. The Republicans still controlled the mountains and waged a guerrilla war against the National Army. The Republicans attacked National Army posts and patrols, mainly by sniping, and attacked motor cars. On 13 October, Republicans burned down the Recess Hotel and nearby Glendalough House to prevent the National troops from using them as billets.

On 29 October, the Republicans recaptured Clifden from the around 100 National troops stationed there. The attacking force consisted of around 350 men. They also had with them an "armoured car", called The Queen of the West. This was used to advance towards a defended barracks building. Eventually, the National troops surrendered. However, the Republicans did not occupy the town, which had sustained some damage during the fighting. Communications were once again severed, and the Republicans took up positions around the town.

Finally, on 16 December, the National Army returned to Clifden and the Republicans once again slipped away before their arrival. The townspeople again welcomed the National Army and soon repairs started on bridges and the Galway to Clifden railway line. Soon after, the first train in seven months arrived in Clifden.

== Transport ==
=== Road ===
The N59 road from Galway (77 km away) to Westport, County Mayo (64 km) passes through the town.

Regular coach services are provided by Bus Éireann and Citylink, connecting Clifden with Galway city. Some bus services operate through Oughterard, to the south of Lough Corrib, while others operate via Clonbur / Headford to the north of Lough Corrib.

=== Rail ===
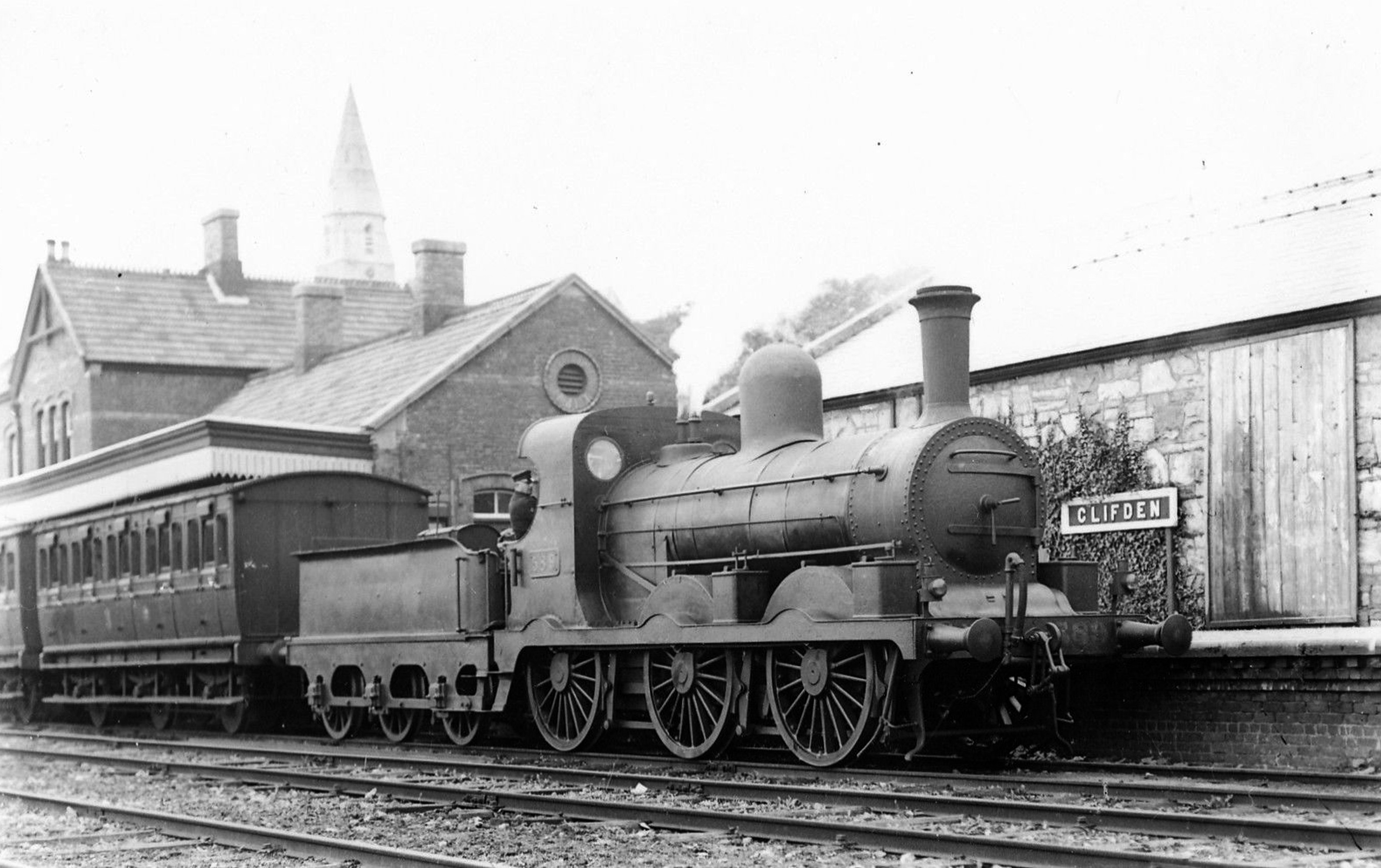
A train at Clifden railway station

Beginning 1 July 1895, Clifden railway station was the western terminus of the Midland Great Western Railway Galway to Clifden line. The line closed in 1935.

=== Airport ===
In 1989, a group of Clifden businessmen issued shares for a company and applied for planning permission for a 1,200-metre runway and associated buildings at Ardagh. A group of locals began to campaign against this proposal, later calling themselves "Save Roundstone Bog". Galway County Council refused planning permission for the airport due to feared damage to the natural beauty of the area, and because it was designated an 'Area of International Scientific Importance' (ASI). The 'Clifden Airport Co.' appealed and as a consequence of the legal proceedings, which went all the way to the Supreme Court, ASI designations were found to be unconstitutional. The company later proposed to exchange the site at Ardagh for part of the Marconi site at Derrygimlagh. However, this also failed due to local and nationwide opposition. Eventually, a smaller 600-metre runway was suggested at Cloon near Cleggan. This runway was built in 2008 and the airfield was supposed to be used for flights to Inishbofin. It has been assigned the airport code EICD but by 2012 it had not been opened for traffic.

== Economy ==
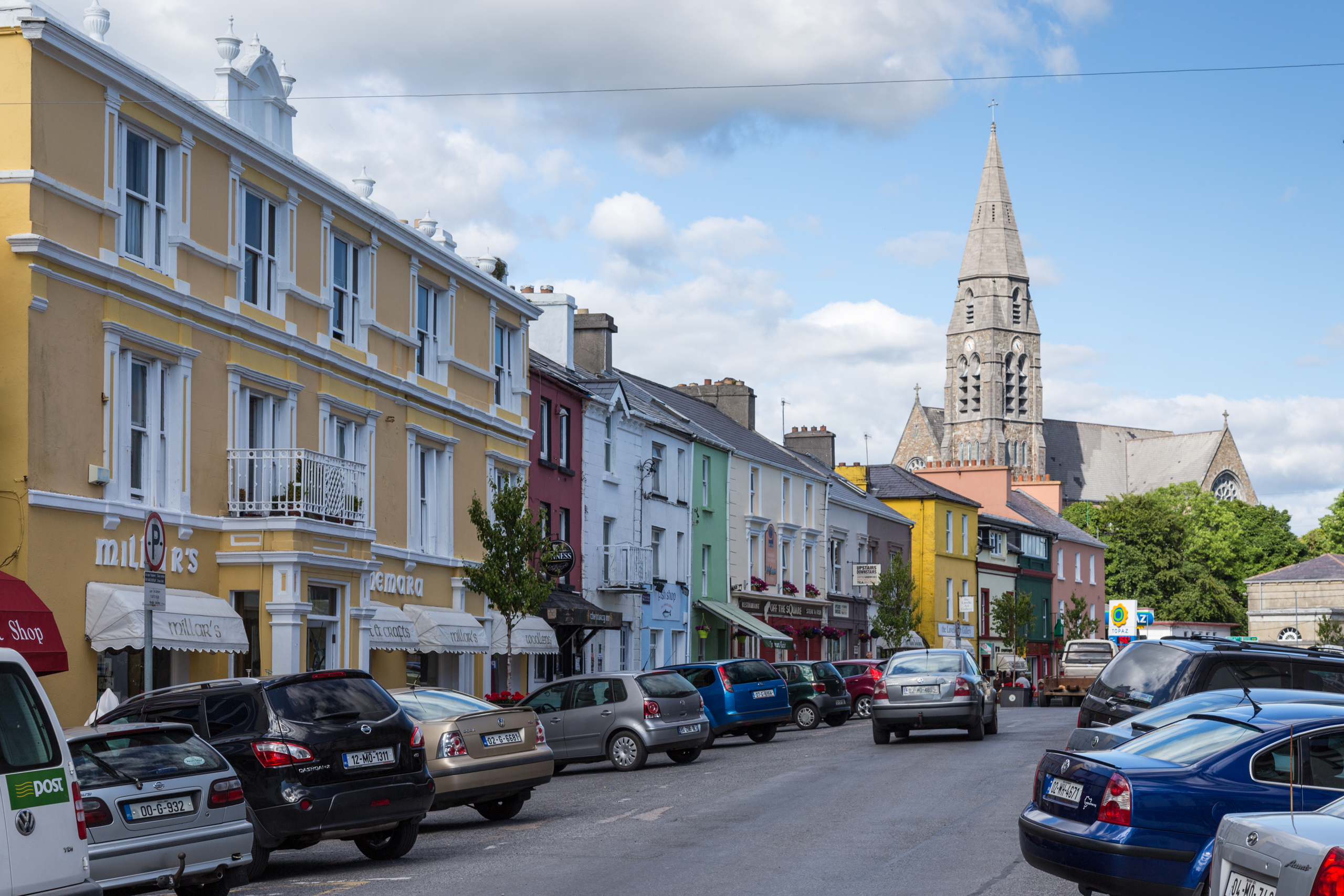
Clifden main street

Clifden is the main town in Connemara; therefore it is home to a range of services. The HQ for the Connemara Garda Siochana service is in Clifden and the main fire station for Connemara is in Clifden.

There is a public library serving the area which offers material relating to local history. The library hosts an ongoing programme of exhibitions, readings and other cultural events.

There are three supermarkets in Clifden and 13 pubs.

== Tourism ==
Clifden is a tourist destination for people exploring Connemara. Places of interest in and around Clifden include:

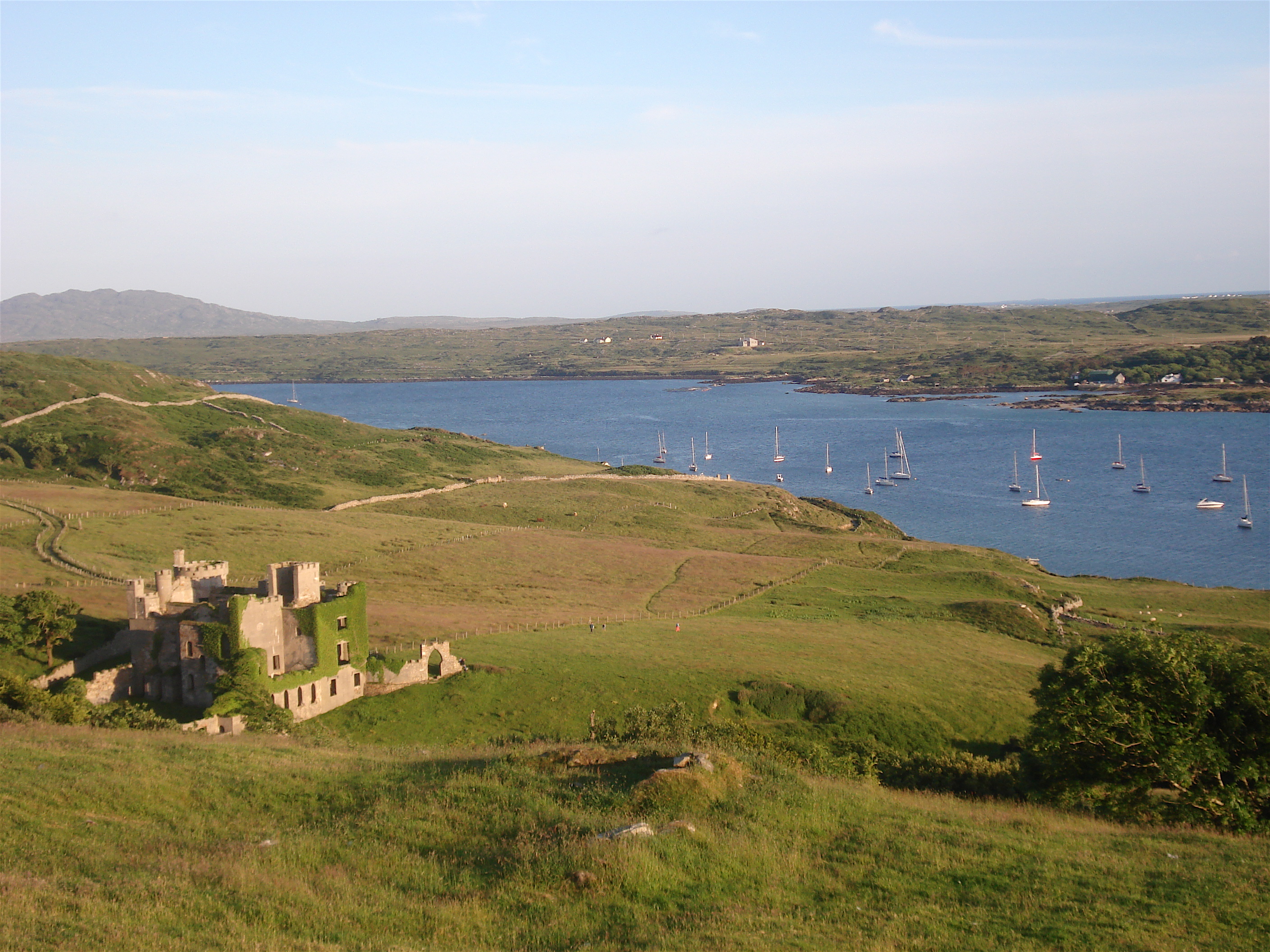
Clifden Castle

- Twelve Bens
- Connemara National Park
- Sky Road: an 11 km drive along Clifden Bay and Streamstown Bay rising more than 150 m above sea level at Slyne Head, with views of the Atlantic, Clifden Castle, coast-guard station, the islands of Inishturk and Turbot and the town.
- Derrygimlagh Bog: a natural wilderness of blanket bog 6 km south of Clifden and the site of the Alcock and Brown crash-landing and the Marconi transatlantic wireless station.
- Inishbofin
- Slyne Head Lighthouse
- The Station House includes a hotel, shops, museum, and flats. The Station House was Clifden's railway station from 1 July 1895 to 29 April 1935.
- St. Joseph's Roman Catholic Church

== Events ==
The Connemara Pony Show is organised by the Connemara Pony Breeders' Society and has been held on the third Thursday in August since 1924. Since 1947 the show has been held in Clifden.

Community Arts Week in late September offers poetry reading, lectures, recitals and traditional music. The festival was first started by teachers in Clifden Community School in 1979 to bring creative arts into the classroom.

During the Omey Island Races, horse racing occurs on the beach.

== Religion ==
Clifden lies within the Roman Catholic Diocese of Tuam and the Church of Ireland Diocese of Tuam, Killala and Achonry, and its Omey Union Parish. Clifden has two churches: St. Joseph's (Roman Catholic), completed in 1879, and Christ Church (Church of Ireland), built in 1853, replacing an earlier structure dating to 1810.

The St. Patrick Orthodox Mission, part of the Russian Orthodox Church Outside of Russia, was opened in October 2023.

== Sports ==
The local Gaelic Athletic Association (GAA) club, Naomh Feichin's GAA, won the Galway Junior Football Championship in 2022. Clifden is also home to the Connemara Blacks, a rugby team that draws team members from Connemara.

== Climate ==
Climate data for Clifden, 1991–2020 averages
Month	Jan	Feb	Mar	Apr	May	Jun	Jul	Aug	Sep	Oct	Nov	Dec	Year
Mean daily maximum °C (°F)	9.1 (48.4)	9.5 (49.1)	10.6 (51.1)	12.5 (54.5)	14.7 (58.5)	16.3 (61.3)	17.7 (63.9)	18.0 (64.4)	16.7 (62.1)	13.8 (56.8)	11.1 (52.0)	9.3 (48.7)	13.3 (55.9)
Daily mean °C (°F)	6.6 (43.9)	6.8 (44.2)	7.6 (45.7)	9.2 (48.6)	11.4 (52.5)	13.3 (55.9)	14.9 (58.8)	15.0 (59.0)	13.7 (56.7)	11.2 (52.2)	8.7 (47.7)	6.9 (44.4)	10.4 (50.8)
Mean daily minimum °C (°F)	4.1 (39.4)	4.1 (39.4)	4.7 (40.5)	6.0 (42.8)	8.0 (46.4)	10.3 (50.5)	12.1 (53.8)	12.1 (53.8)	10.7 (51.3)	8.5 (47.3)	6.3 (43.3)	4.5 (40.1)	7.6 (45.7)
Average precipitation mm (inches)	135.6 (5.34)	109.0 (4.29)	91.2 (3.59)	74.8 (2.94)	69.7 (2.74)	74.2 (2.92)	84.9 (3.34)	100.7 (3.96)	102.3 (4.03)	133.2 (5.24)	139.0 (5.47)	142.0 (5.59)	1,256.6 (49.45)
Mean monthly sunshine hours	44.9	66.3	105.0	157.3	195.5	167.5	134.7	144.7	123.8	92.6	48.2	42.0	1,322.5
Source: MeteoStat

== In literature ==
Michel Houellebecq's novel Atomised is partly set in Clifden.

== Notable people ==
- John Patrick Riley (c.1817–c.1850), a Clifden native, deserted from the United States Army after experiencing anti-Catholicism in the United States and what he said was "religious persecution" by U.S. officers. Riley became a major in the Mexican Army with the Saint Patrick's Battalion, a unit of about 200 European immigrants and expatriates, many of whom had deserted from the U.S. army during the Mexican–American War. Clifden commemorates Riley with a bronze street sculpture and the town flies the Mexican flag annually on 12 September.
- John Bamlet Smallman (1849–1916), an Irish-Canadian businessman, was born in Clifden.
- Thomas Whelan (1898–1921), an IRA Volunteer executed by hanging at Mountjoy Gaol during the Irish War of Independence. Now buried as one of The Forgotten Ten at Glasnevin Cemetery in Dublin. A ceremony still commemorates Whelan every year in his native Clifden.

== Town twinning ==
- Coyoacan, Mexico (2012)
- Southwest Ranches, Florida, United States (2006)

== See also ==
- List of firsts in aviation
- List of towns and villages in Ireland
- List of RNLI stations
- Ballyconneely
