= Derryclare Lough =

Lake in County Galway, Ireland

- Loch Dhoire an Chláir (Irish)
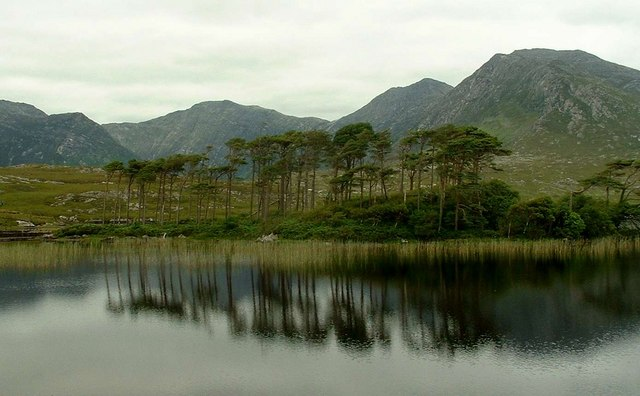
- Behind are the peaks (r-to-l) of Derryclare, Bencorr, and Bencollaghduff

- Location in Ireland
- Location: County Galway
- Coordinates: 53°28′17″N 9°46′38″W
- Catchment area: 111.73 km^{2} (43.1 sq mi)
- Basin countries: Ireland
- Max. length: 4 km (2.5 mi)
- Max. width: 1 km (0.6 mi)
- Surface area: 2.24 km^{2} (0.86 sq mi)
- Surface elevation: 10 m (33 ft)

Derryclare Lough (Irish: Loch Dhoire an Chláir) is a freshwater lake at the entrance of the Inagh Valley, in Connemara, County Galway, in the west of Ireland.

== Geography ==
Derryclare Lough is located about 20 km (12 mi) east of Clifden on the N59 road. The Twelve Bens mountain range lies to the north of the lake, with the Ben of Derryclare 677 metres (2,221 ft) overlooking the lake itself. Derryclare Lough is fed from rivers from Lough Inagh, which itself is fed from several mountain streams in the area, but most importantly from the Gleninagh River that starts high up in the Gleninagh Valley on the slopes of Benbaun and Bencollaghduff, and the Tooreennacoona River. Derryclare Lough flows into Ballynahinch Lake, where it eventually joins the Owenmore River, and flows into Bertraghboy Bay.

== Fishing ==
Derryclare Lough is noted for its lake and river fishing with spring salmon, grilse and sea trout, and the fishing is done from "Butts" (e.g. long piers from the shore), and particularly the Derryclare Butts, Glendollagh Butts, and the Greenpoint Butts. The Lough and its fishing rights are privately owned and controlled by local fishing lodges in the Inagh Valley. Irish fishing author, Peter O'Reilly, said about Derryclare Lough that "This fishery has everything".

== Scenic location ==
The lake is a popular scenic location, and extensively photographed, and offers views directly into the Glencoaghan Valley of the Twelve Bens and the peaks of the Glencoaghan Horseshoe, a 16–kilometre 8–9 hour route that is considered one of Ireland's best hill-walks. The lough bounds the 19-hectare Derryclare Nature Reserve a Statutory Nature Reserve, and the larger 789-hectare Derryclare Wood, a Coillte owned commercial conifer forest.

== Gallery ==
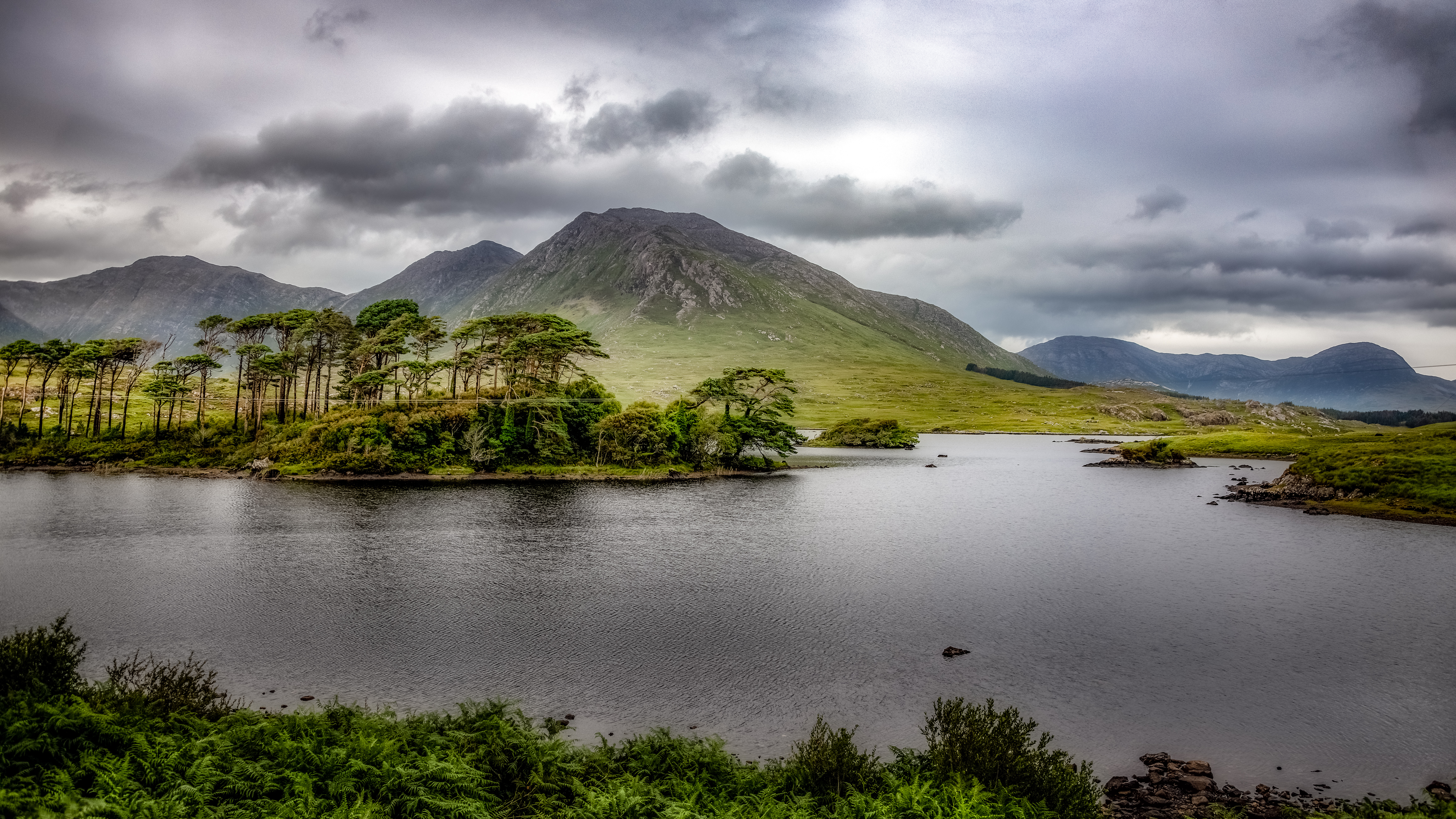
Derryclare (centre), Bencorr (left), and Bencollaghduff (far left)

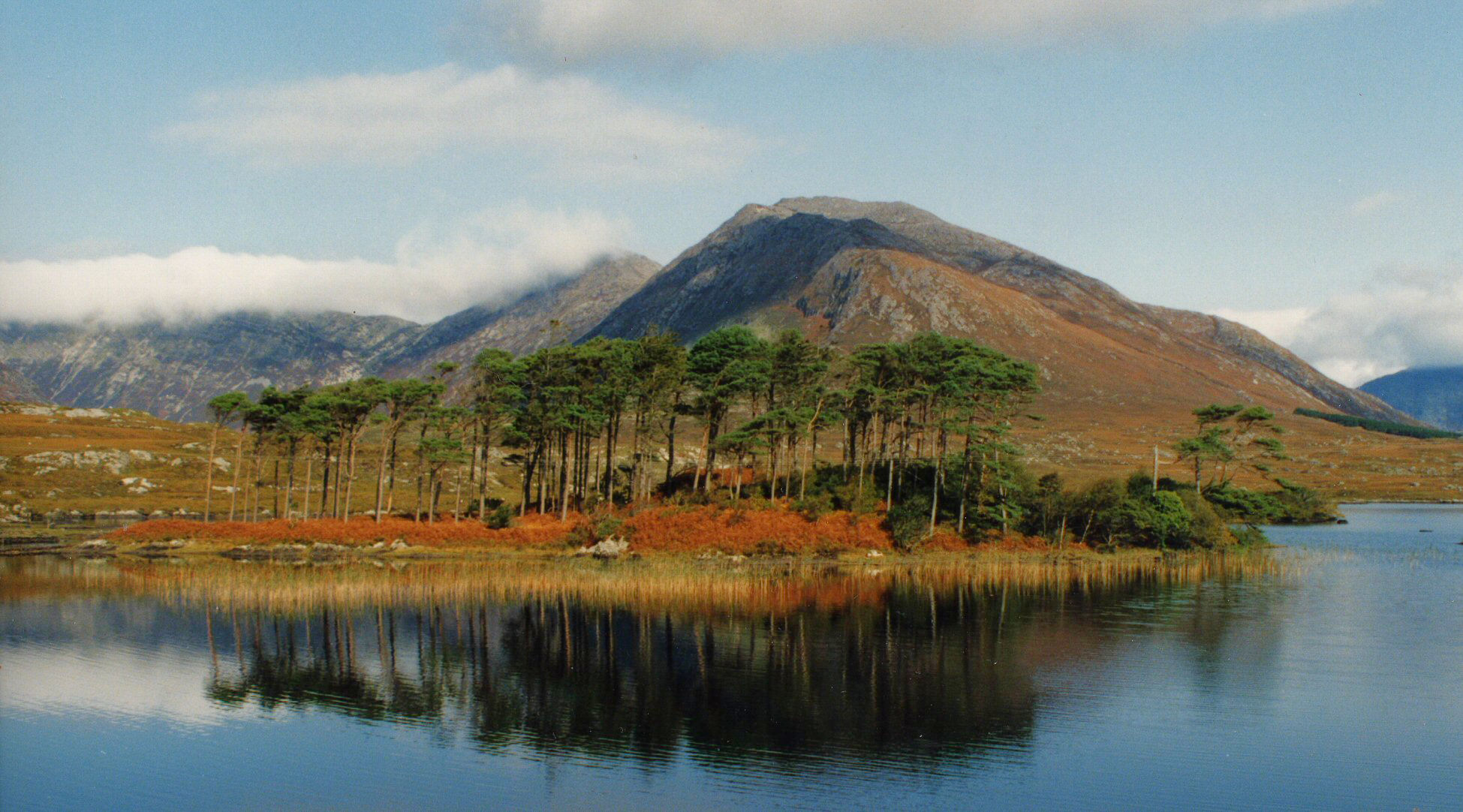
Derryclare with the rest of the Glencoaghan Horseshoe in cloud

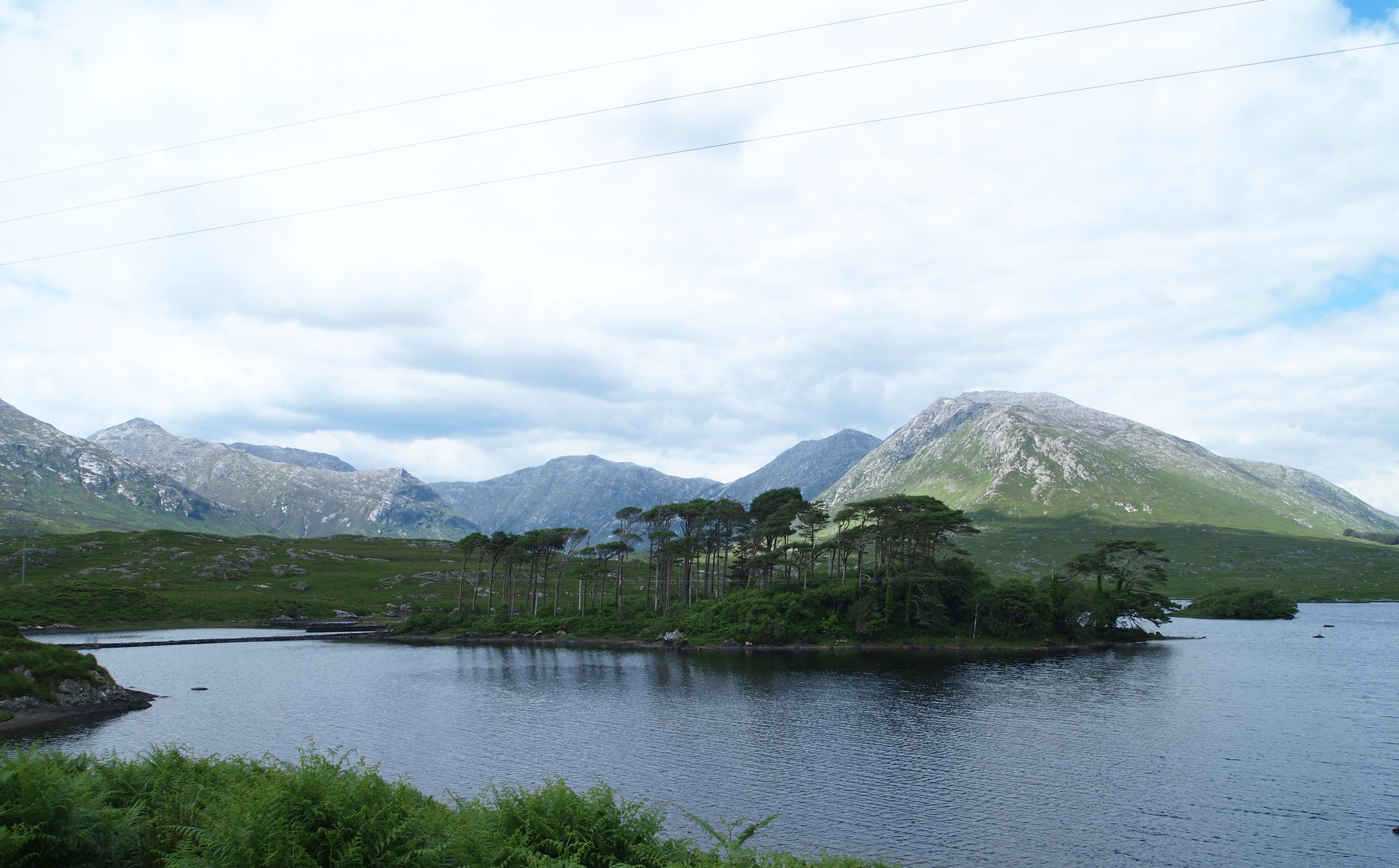
View into the Glencoaghan Horseshoe from Derryclare Lough

== Bibliography ==
- Fairbairn, Helen (2014). Ireland's Best Walks: A Walking Guide. Collins Press. ISBN 978-1848892118.
- Dillion, Paddy (2001). Connemara: Collins Rambler's guide. Harper Collins. ISBN 978-0002201216.
- Dillion, Paddy (1993). The Mountains of Ireland: A Guide to Walking the Summits. Cicerone. ISBN 978-1852841102.
- Peter O'Reilly (1993). TROUT & SALMON RIVERS OF IRELAND - An Angler's Guide. Merlin Unwin. ISBN 978-1873674093.

== See also ==
- Lough Inagh
- Twelve Bens
- Mweelrea, major range in Killary Harbour
- Maumturks, major range in Connemara
- Lists of mountains in Ireland
- List of loughs in Ireland
