= Lough Inagh =

Lake in County Galway, Ireland

- Loch Eidhneach (Irish)
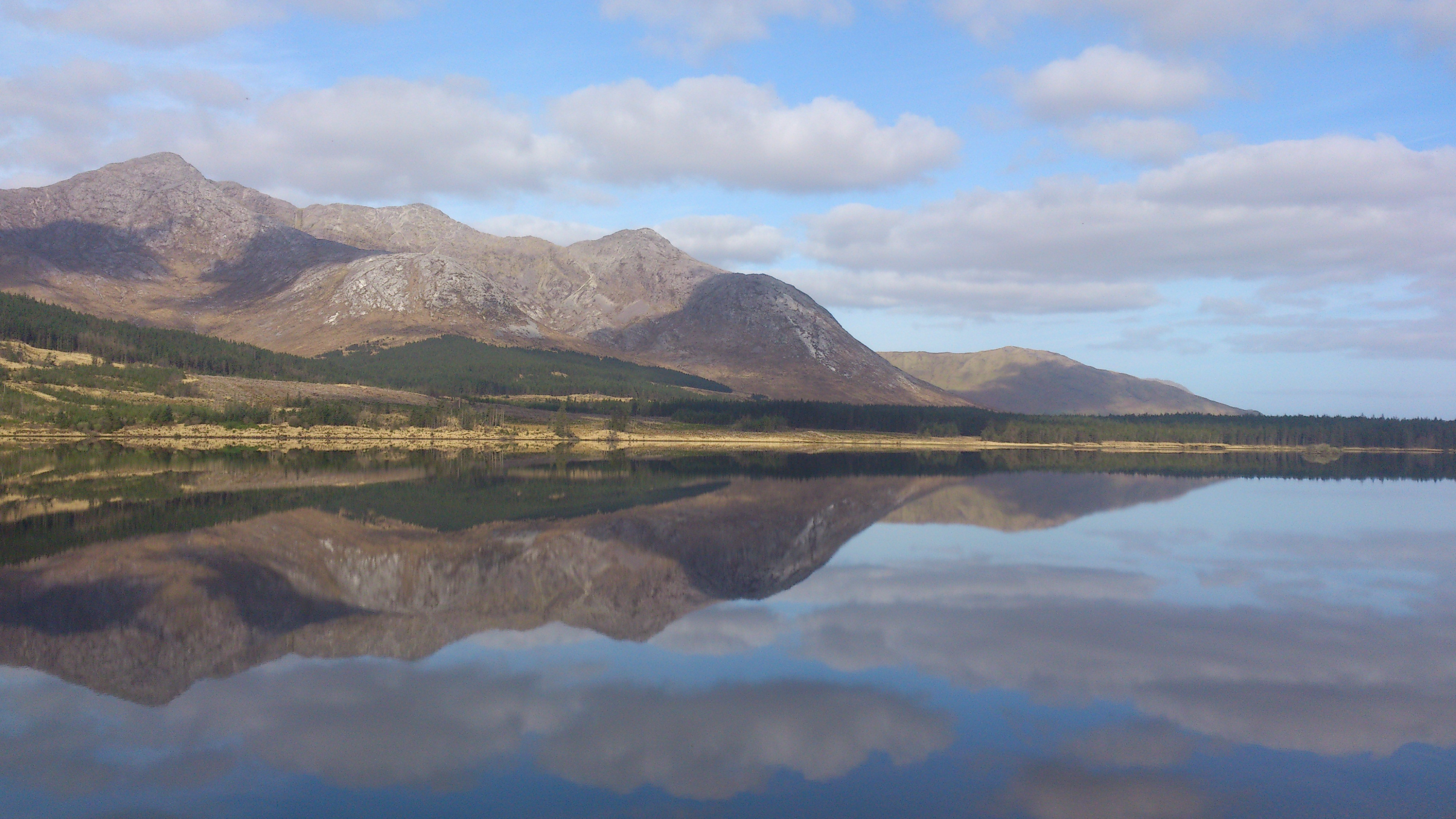
- Bencorr and Bencorr North Top, with its two easterly spurs, from Lough Inagh

- Location within Ireland
- Location: County Galway, Ireland
- Coordinates: 53.515304°N 9.741515°W
- Primary inflows: Tooreennacoona River; Gleninagh River
- Primary outflows: Derryclare Lough
- Basin countries: Ireland
- Surface area: 3.1 km^{2} (1.2 sq mi)
- Surface elevation: 21 m (69 ft)
- Islands: Deer Island, Illauninagh, Eagle Islands, Red Island, Crow's Island, Otter Island, Man's Island, Lue Island

Lough Inagh (Irish: Loch Eidhneach, meaning 'lake of the place of ivy') is a freshwater lake in the Inagh Valley, in Connemara, County Galway, in the west of Ireland.

== Geography ==
Lough Inagh is located about 23 km (14 mi) east of Clifden on the R344 road in the Inagh Valley. The Twelve Bens range lies to the west of the lake, with Derryclare 677 metres (2,221 ft) and Bencorr 711 metres (2,333 ft) directly overlooking the lake. The bulk of the Maumturks range and its long central spine lies to the east of the lake, with two highest peaks of Letterbreckaun 677 metres (2,221 ft) and Binn idir an Dá Log 702 metres (2,303 ft), also overlooking the Lough.

Lough Inagh is fed from several mountain streams in the area, but most importantly from the Gleninagh River that starts high up in the Gleninagh Valley on the slopes of Benbaun and Bencollaghduff, and the Tooreennacoona River. After flowing into Lough Inagh, the river flows into Derryclare Lough, and then into Ballynahinch Lake, where it eventually joins the Owenmore River where is flows into Bertraghboy Bay.

== Fishing ==
Lough Inagh is noted for its lake and river fishing with spring salmon, grilse and sea trout (depending on season), and the fishing is mostly done from boats, however, the lake is too big for rowing and an outboard motor is recommended (there are a couple of submerged rocks so caution should be taken).

The Lough and its fishing rights are privately owned and controlled by local fishing lodges in the Inagh Valley. Irish fishing author, Peter O'Reilly, said about Lough Inagh that "This lough will take more than one day to explore adequately, for it can be one of the best".

== Scenic location ==
The lake is a popular scenic location and to the west, gives views directly into the large deep southerly corrie between Derryclare and Bencorr (Irish: Log an Choire Mhóir, meaning "hollow of the big corrie"), as well as the smaller corrie between Bencorr and Bencorr North Top (Irish: Log an Choire Bhig, meaning "hollow of the small corrie"). It also looks into the Derryclare Wood and Derryclare Nature Reserve, which lie at the base of the two corries as they meet the Lough.

The northernmost end of the Lough, just beside Bencorrbeg 577 metres (1,893 ft), has views into the Gleninagh Valley (Irish: Gleann Eidhneach, meaning "Valley of Ivy"), from which the Lough derives its name; the south wall of the valley is the impressive Carrot Ridge rock-climbing location, while at the head of the valley are Bencollaghduff 696 metres (2,283 ft), and the highest peak in the Twelve Bens range, Benbaun at 729 metres (2,392 ft).

== Gallery ==
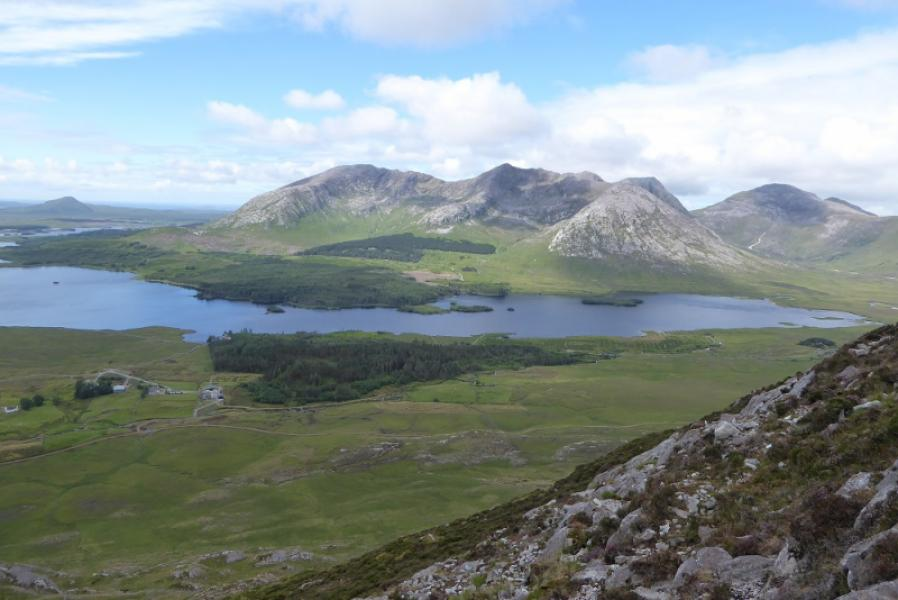
Lough Inagh from slopes of Letterbreckaun, with Derryclare (l), Bencorr (c), and Benbaun (r)

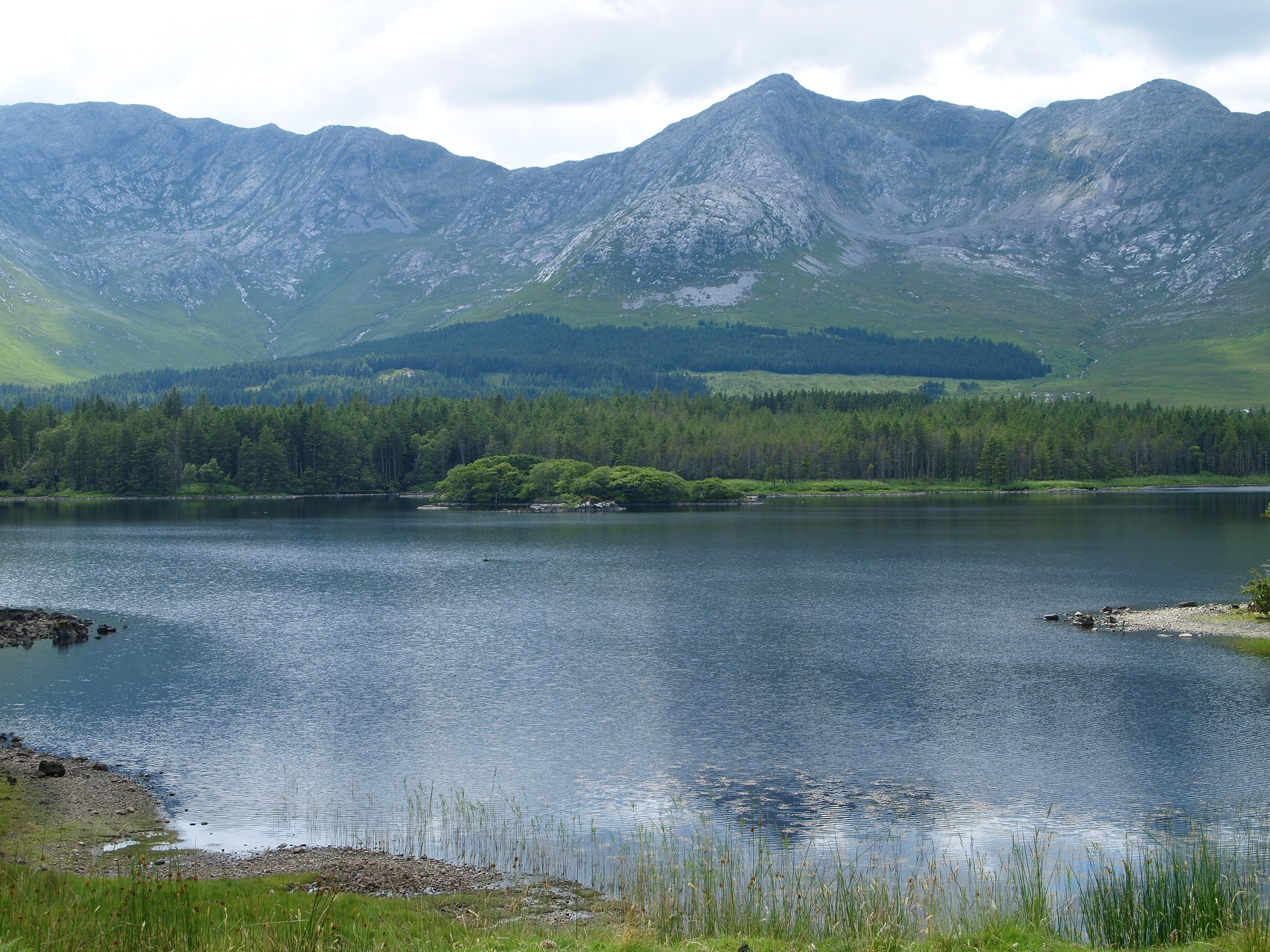
Derryclare (l), Bencorr (c), Bencorr North Top (r), and two Log an Choire corries

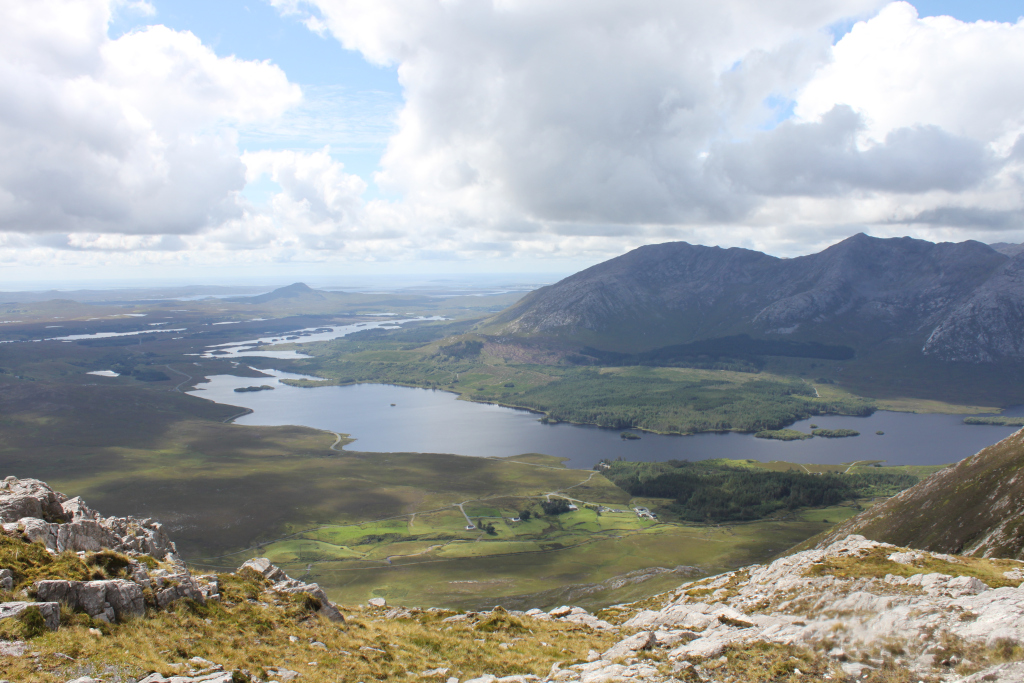
Lough Inagh and the Twelve Bens, viewed from the Maumturks

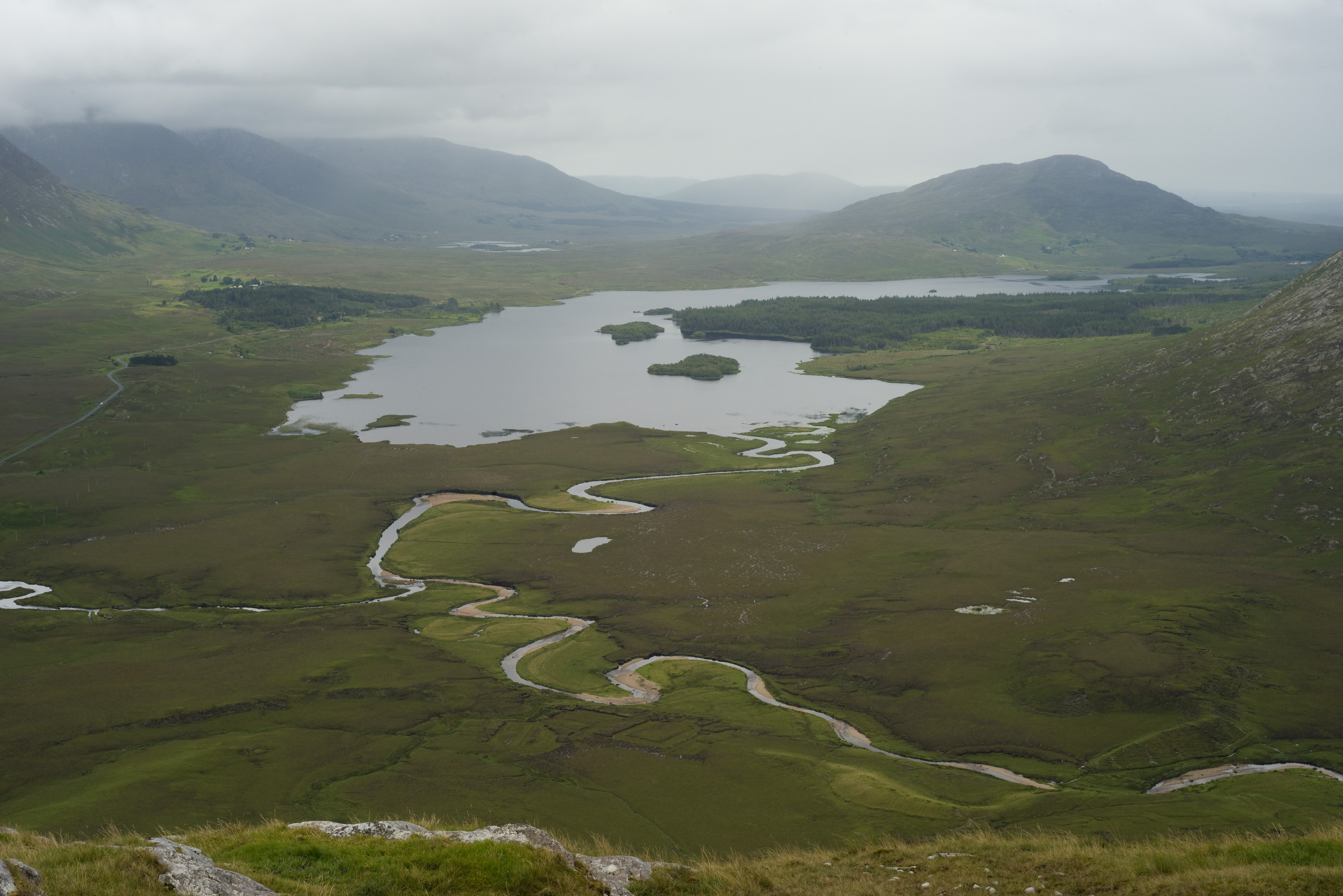
Lough Inagh and Lissoughter (back, right), viewed from Knockpasheemore

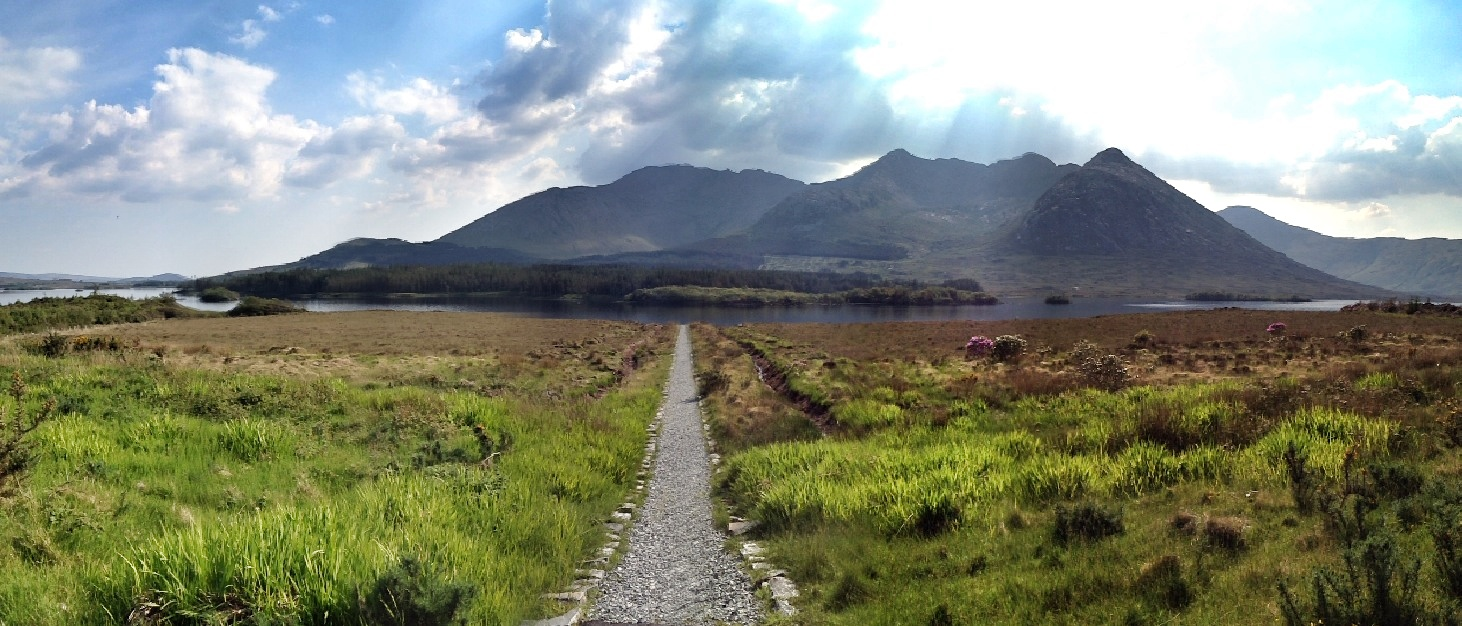
Looking west over Lough Inagh to Derryclare and Bencorr–Bencorr North Top, and the two Log an Choire corries

== Bibliography ==
- Fairbairn, Helen (2014). Ireland's Best Walks: A Walking Guide. Collins Press. ISBN 978-1848892118.
- Dillion, Paddy (2001). Connemara: Collins Rambler's guide. Harper Collins. ISBN 978-0002201216.
- Dillion, Paddy (1993). The Mountains of Ireland: A Guide to Walking the Summits. Cicerone. ISBN 978-1852841102.
- Peter O'Reilly (1993). TROUT & SALMON RIVERS OF IRELAND - An Angler's Guide. Merlin Unwin. ISBN 978-1873674093.

== See also ==
- Derryclare Lough
- Twelve Bens
- Mweelrea, major range in Killary Harbour
- Maumturks, major range in Connemara
- Lists of mountains in Ireland
- List of loughs in Ireland
