= Benbreen =

Mountain in County Galway, Ireland

- Binn Braoin
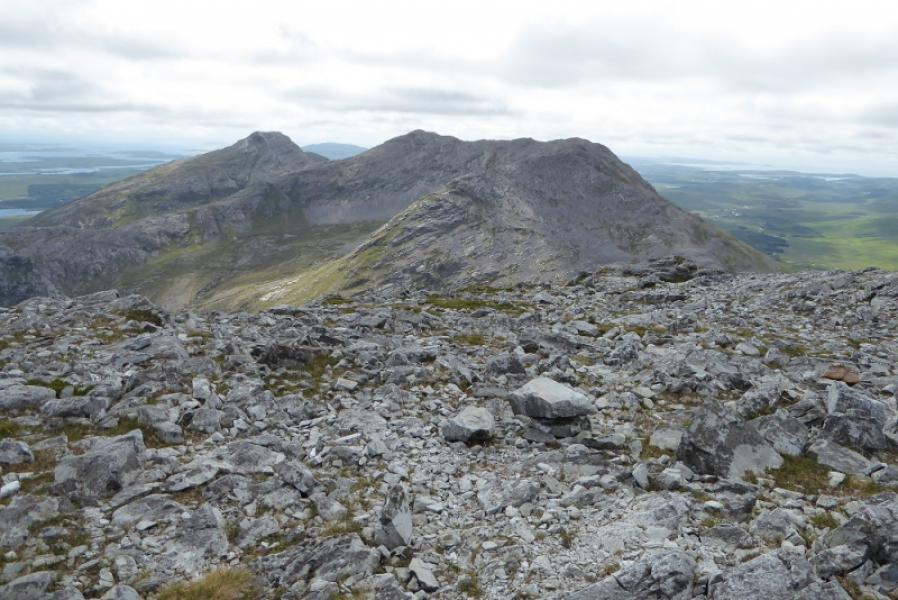
- Beenbreen, Benbreen Central Top, and Benbreen North Top from the summit of Bencollaghduff. Bengower is the peak at left and back.

Highest point
- Elevation: 691 m (2,267 ft)
- Prominence: 186 m (610 ft)
- Listing: 100 Highest Irish Mountains, Marilyn, Hewitt, Arderin, Simm, Vandeleur-Lynam
- Coordinates: 53°30′00″N 9°50′04″W

Naming
- English translation: Braon's peak
- Language of name: Irish

Geography
- Location within Ireland
- Location: County Galway, Ireland
- Parent range: Twelve Bens
- OSI/OSNI grid: L7831151547
- Topo map: OSi Discovery 37

Geology
- Rock type(s): Pale quartzites, grits, graphitic top bedrock

Benbreen (Irish: Binn Braoin, meaning 'Braon's Peak') at 691 metres (2,267 ft), is the 100th–highest peak in Ireland on the Arderin scale, and the 122nd–highest peak on the Vandeleur-Lynam scale. Benbreen lies in the southern end of the Twelve Bens mountain range in the Connemara National Park in County Galway, Ireland. Benbreen is the 4th-tallest mountain of the Twelve Bens range, after Benbaun 729 metres (2,392 ft), Bencorr 711 metres (2,333 ft), and Bencollaghduff 696 metres (2,283 ft). Benbreen's profile is of a "high narrow rocky ridge with several summits", than a typical "peaked mountain".

== Naming ==
Irish academic Paul Tempan notes that Irish: Braon can mean "drip" or "drop", but is more likely related to a personal name, and is the basis of the local surnames Irish: Ó Braoin and Irish: Mac Braoin, which have been anglicised as "Breen" and "McBreen".

== Geography ==
The actual summit of Benbreen lies on the southern end of a long high rocky quartzite ridge that includes the subsidiary peaks of Benbreen Central Top 680 metres (2,230 ft), and Benbreen North Top 674 metres (2,211 ft); this gives Benbreen the profile of a "high narrow ridge", with Benbreen as the South Top, than a typical "peaked mountain". Benbreen Central Top's prominence of 25 metres (82 ft), and Benbreen North Top's prominence of 16 metres (52 ft), qualify them both as Vandeleur-Lynams on the Irish mountain classification system.

Benbreen lies between the summits of Bencollaghduff 696 metres (2,283 ft) to the north, and Bengower 664 metres (2,178 ft) to the south, and its southerly ridge down to the col with Bengower (known as Irish: Mám na Gaoithe, or "pass of the wind" at 470 metres), is noted for its large deposits of scree.

Benbreen's prominence of 186 metres (610 ft) qualifies it as a Marilyn, and it also ranks it as the 60th-highest mountain in Ireland on the MountainViews Online Database, 100 Highest Irish Mountains, where the minimum prominence threshold is 100 metres.

== Recreation ==
=== Hill walking ===
Benbreen is most often climbed as part of the popular 16–kilometre 8–9 hour Glencoaghan Horseshoe, considered one of Ireland's best high-grade hill-walking routes. Benbreen is also climbed as part of the even longer Owenglin Horseshoe, a 20–kilometre 10–12 hour route around the Owenglin River taking in over twelve summits;

=== Rock climbing ===
Benbreen's northeastern cliffs have multi-pitch rock-climbs with grades from Diff (D) to Moderate Severe (MS), and length ranging from 40 to 130 metres. Some of the first ascents date from the mid-1980s, and noted routes include Blind Faith (S 3a, 4a, 3a, 80 m), and Stoned & Starving (S -, 4a, 75 m).

== Gallery ==
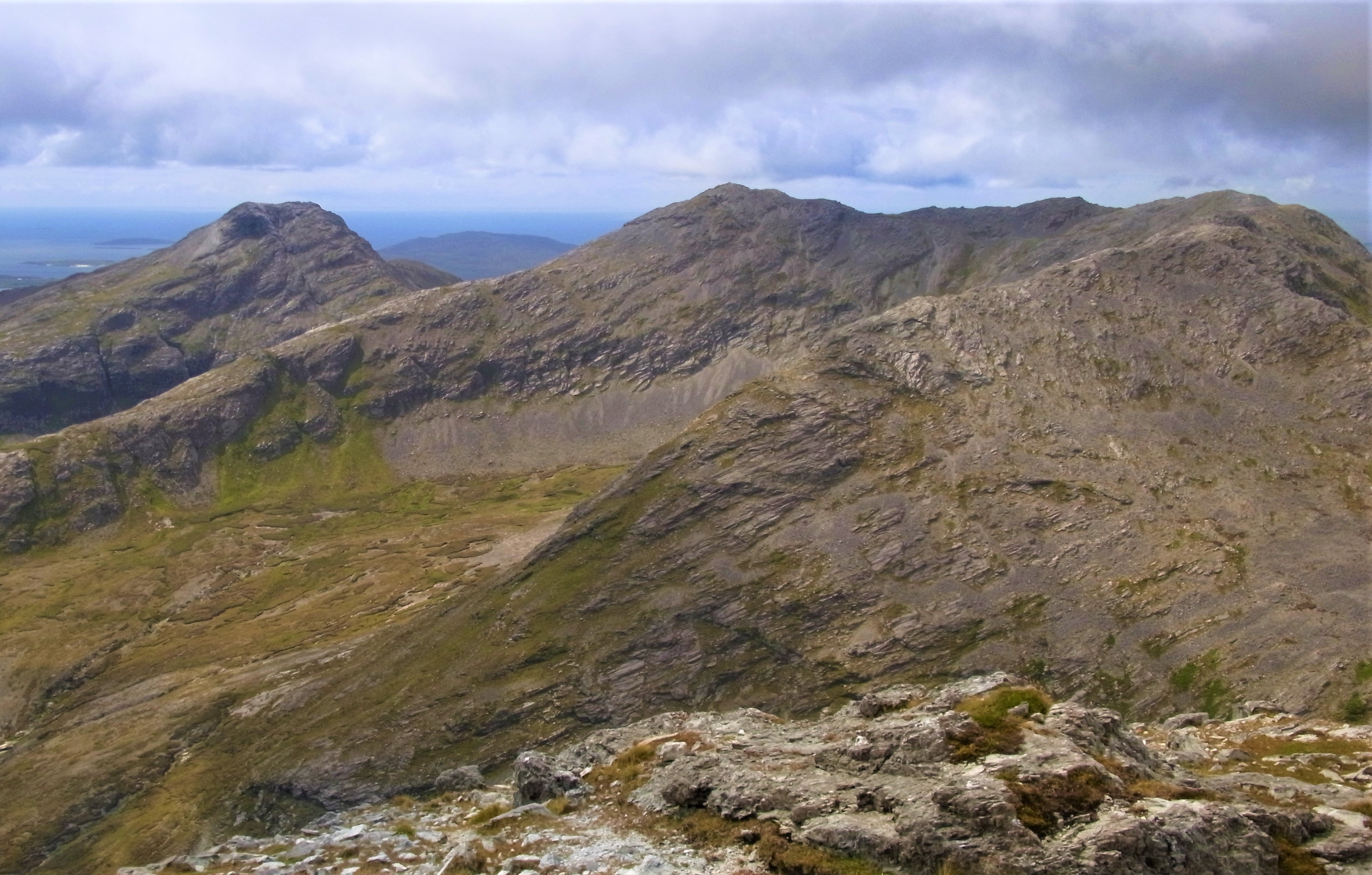
Bengower (left) and Benbreen (right), from the summit of Bencollaghduff

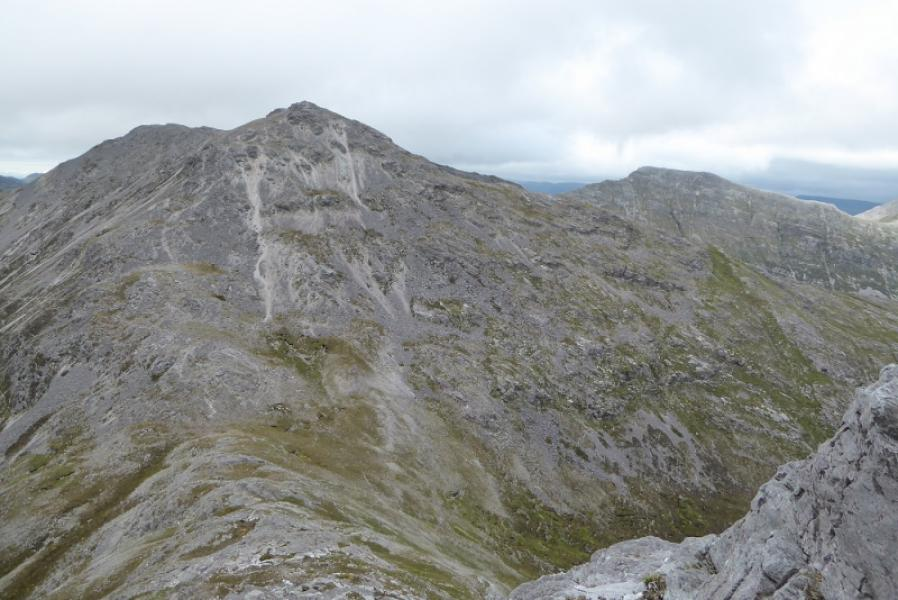
Benbreen and its southern scree slopes, from the summit of Bengower

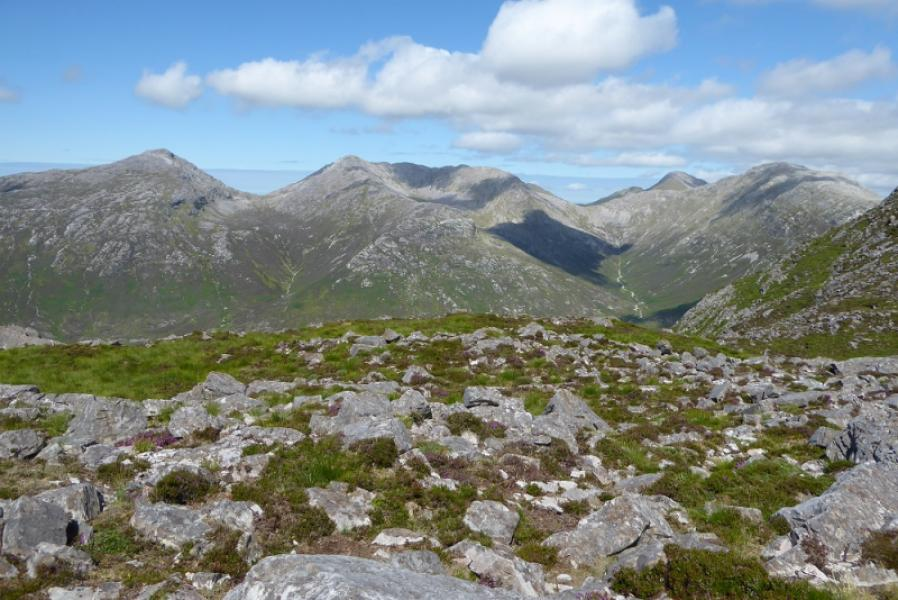
Bengower (left), Benbreen's high summit ridge (centre), and Bencollaghduff (right)

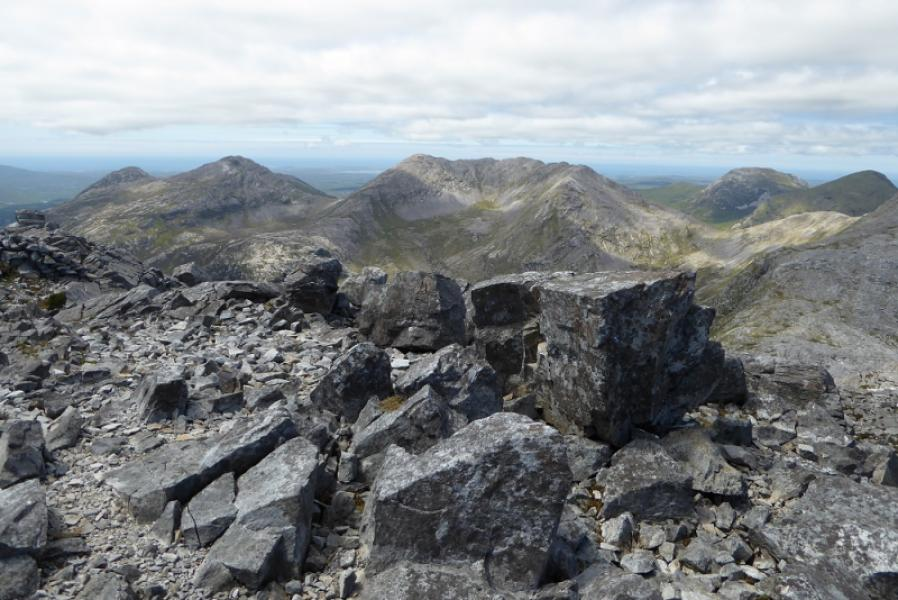
Benbreen's mini-massif and summit ridge, from Bencorr

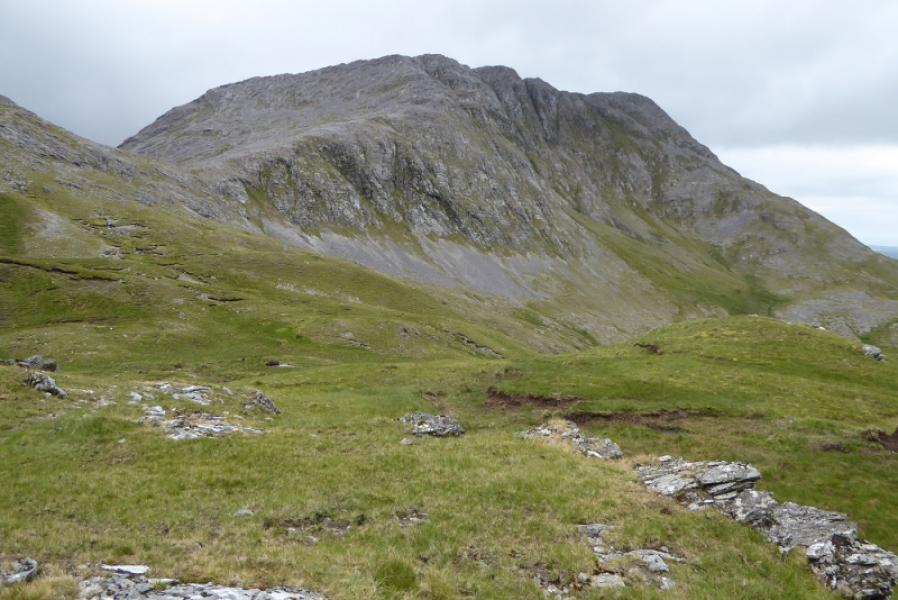
Benbreen's northeast face (see rock climbing), viewed from the col of Maumina with Benbaun

== Bibliography ==
- Fairbairn, Helen (2014). Ireland's Best Walks: A Walking Guide. Collins Press. ISBN 978-1848892118.
- MountainViews Online Database (Simon Stewart) (2013). A Guide to Ireland's Mountain Summits: The Vandeleur-Lynams & the Arderins. Collins Books. ISBN 978-1-84889-164-7.
- Dillion, Paddy (2001). Connemara: Collins Rambler's guide. Harper Collins. ISBN 978-0002201216.
- Dillion, Paddy (1993). The Mountains of Ireland: A Guide to Walking the Summits. Cicerone. ISBN 978-1852841102.

== See also ==
- Twelve Bens
- Mweelrea, major range in Killary Harbour
- Maumturks, major range in Connemara
- Lists of mountains in Ireland
- Lists of mountains and hills in the British Isles
- List of Marilyns in the British Isles
- List of Hewitt mountains in England, Wales and Ireland
