= R344 road =

R344 road may refer to:

- R344 road (Ireland)
- R344 road (South Africa)
