= Derryclare =

Mountain in Connemara, Ireland

- Binn Doire Chláir
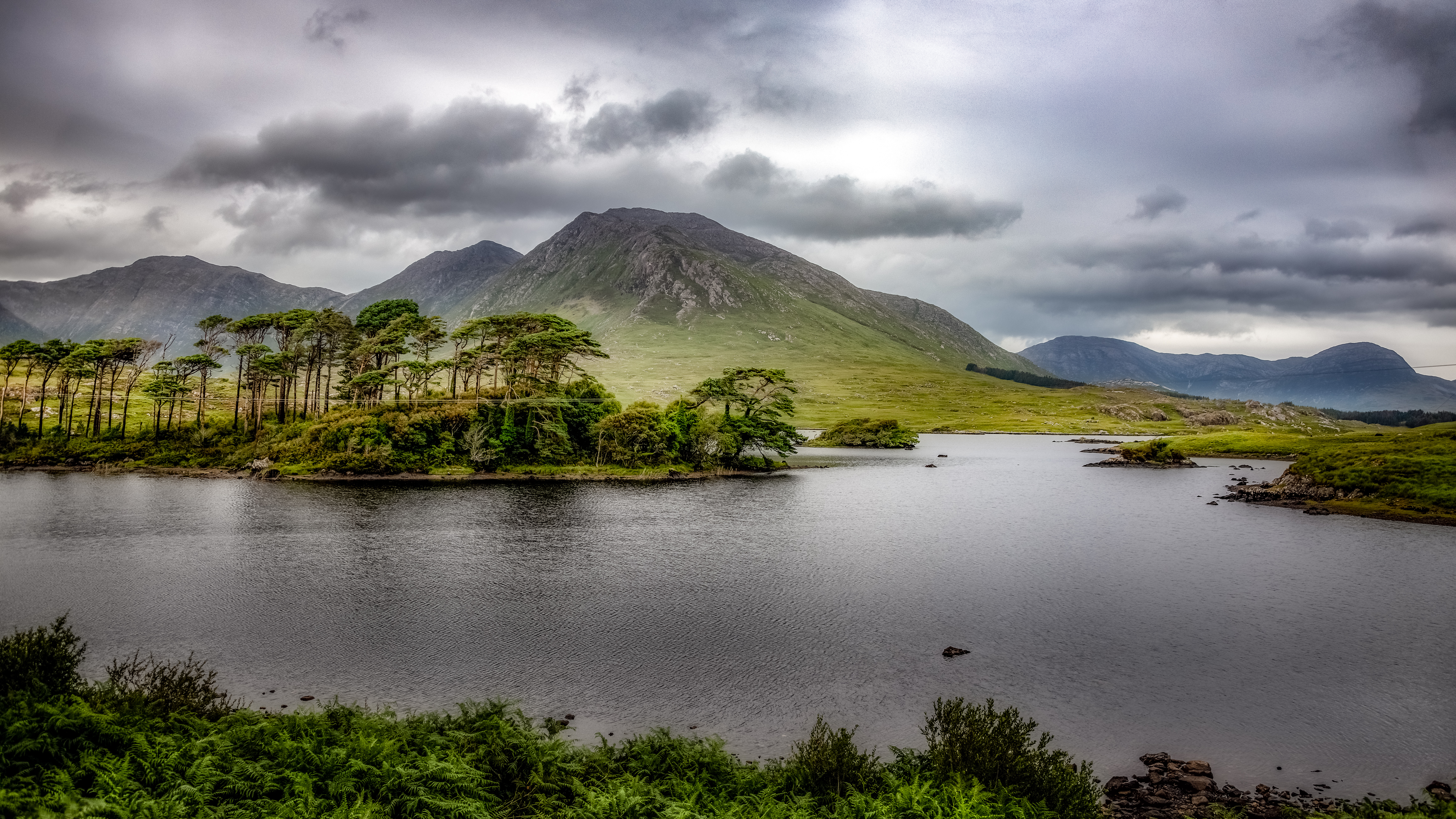
- Derryclare mountain, behind Derryclare Lough

Highest point
- Elevation: 677 m (2,221 ft)
- Prominence: 129 m (423 ft)
- Listing: 100 Highest Irish Mountains, Hewitt, Arderin, Simm, Vandeleur-Lynam
- Coordinates: 53°29′47″N 9°47′09″W

Naming
- English translation: peak of Derryclare [townland] / peak of the oak-wood of the plain
- Language of name: Irish

Geography
- Location within Ireland
- Location: County Galway, Ireland
- Parent range: Twelve Bens
- OSI/OSNI grid: L8150951048
- Topo map: OSi Discovery 37

Geology
- Rock type(s): Pale quartzites, grits, graphitic Bedrock

Derryclare or Derryclare Mountain (Irish: Binn Doire Chláir) is a mountain at the southern edge of Twelve Bens range in Connemara National Park in County Galway, Ireland. At 677 metres (2,221 ft), it is the 119th–highest peak in Ireland on the Arderin list, and the 145th–highest peak on the Vandeleur-Lynam list. It is the 5th tallest of the core Twelve Bens. The Derryclare Lough on its southern slopes is a scenic location in Connemara, while Derryclare Wood, on its eastern slopes, contains a Statutory Nature Reserve (SRN).

Derryclare's prominence of 129 metres (423 ft) does not qualify it as a Marilyn, however, it does rank as the 72nd-highest mountain in Ireland on the MountainViews Online Database, 100 Highest Irish Mountains, where the minimum prominence threshold is 100 metres.

== Naming ==
The name "Derryclare" comes from Irish Doire Chláir; doire means "an oak wood", and clár can mean either a "plain" or a "board/plank-bridge". Irish academic Paul Tempan says Ordnance Survey Ireland most likely transferred the name from the nearby townland of Derryclare, east of the mountain. The full Irish name of the mountain itself is Binn Doire Chláir, meaning "peak of the oak wood at the plain or plank-bridge"; such a translation would be consistent with the easterly slopes of Derryclare, where Derryclare Wood is bounded by Derryclare Lough and Lough Inagh.

On the mountain's southern shoulder is a rocky outcrop called Bennaderreen, from Binn an Doirín, "peak of the little oak wood".

== Geography ==
Derryclare is one of the most southerly of the Bens and sits at the eastern side of the entrance to the large U-shaped valley of the Glencoaghan River. To the south of Derrclare is the scenic lake of Derryclare Lough, and to the east is the large Inagh Valley, and Lough Inagh.

Derryclare's only neighbour is Bencorr 711 metres (2,333 ft), the 2nd-highest peak in the Twelve Bens range, to which it is connected by a high northern rocky ridge. Derryclare and Bencorr form a large deep eastern corrie called Irish: Log an Choire Mhóir (meaning "wood of the big corrie").

The corrie leads down to the Derryclare Wood, which includes a 19-hectare broadleaf forest that is a Statutory Nature Reserve (SRN), and a 789-hectare commercial conifer forest owned and operated by Coillte; both of which are bounded by Derryclare Lough and Lough Inagh.

== Derryclare Nature Reserve ==
In 1980, the Irish state designated 19-hectares of woodland on the eastern slopes of Derryclare as a Statutory Nature Reserve called the Derryclare Nature Reserve (or Derryclare Wood by some sources). The broadleaf trees in the reserve are composed of Sessile Oak, with Rowan (Sorbus aucuparia), Downy Birch (Betula pubescens) and some Ash (Fraxinus excelsior) creating a canopy layer; there are well-developed lichen and fungus flora present. The fungal parasite, Hemigrapha astericus, a native of Australia and South America, was first recorded in the northern hemisphere in Derryclare Wood.

In 2005, 19 Irish red squirrels were translocated from Portumna Forest Park to Derryclare Wood as part of a programme to protect the species in Ireland.

== Hill walking ==
Derryclare is one of the more accessible Twelve Bens, being situated near the N59 road, and a number of routes are available from the Glencoaghan Valley side in the west, or the Derryclare Nature Reserve side in the east, that climb to the summit and back.

Derryclare can be climbed in "horseshoe" walks such as the 11–14 kilometre 5–7 hour circuit of Bencorr (descending via Bencorr's easterly spur at the northern end of Irish: Log an Choire Mhóir), and/or Bencorr North Top (descending via Carrot Ridge, at the northern end of Irish: Log an Choire Bhig).

Derryclare is also often climbed as part of the popular 16–kilometre 8–9 hour Glencoaghan Horseshoe, considered one of Ireland's best hill-walks.

== Rock climbing ==
The large easterly corrie between the summit of Derryclare and the summit of Bencorr, Irish: Log an Choire Mhóir (meaning "wood of the big corrie"), contains several large 200 metre multi-pitch graded rock climbs of grades Diff (D) to Very Diff (VD), the most notable of which is The Knave (VD, 225 m).

== Gallery ==
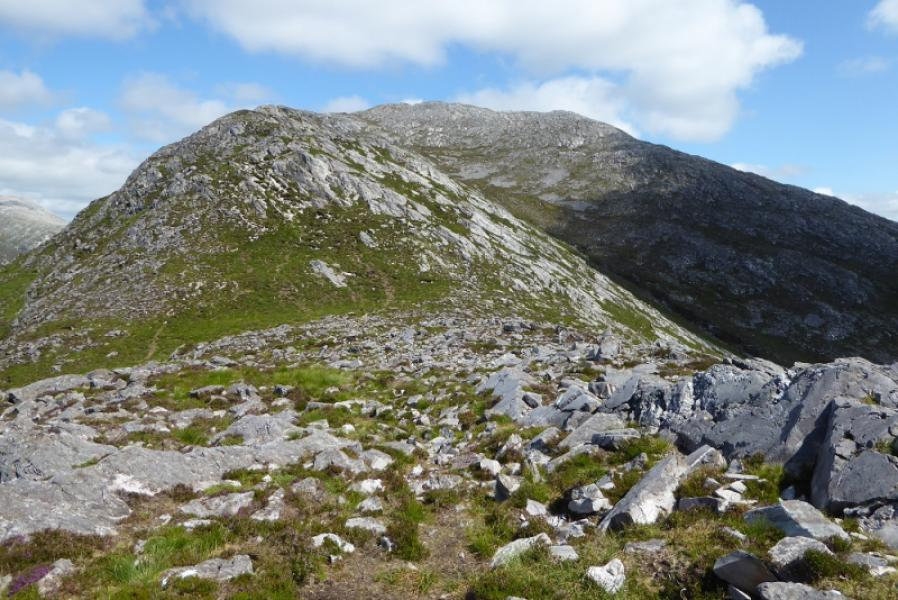
Summit of Derryclare from south-ridge

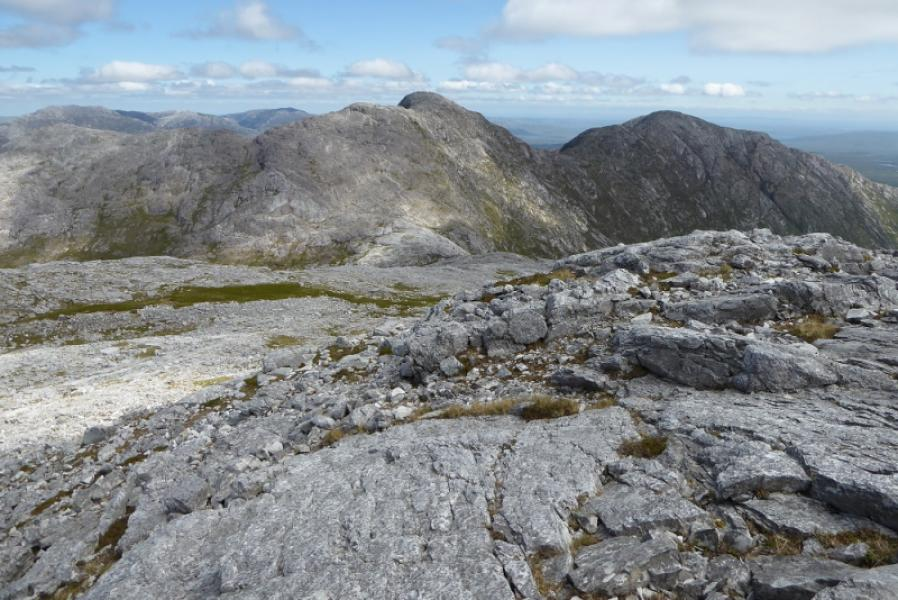
Bencorr (center) and Derryclare (right), from Bencollaghduff

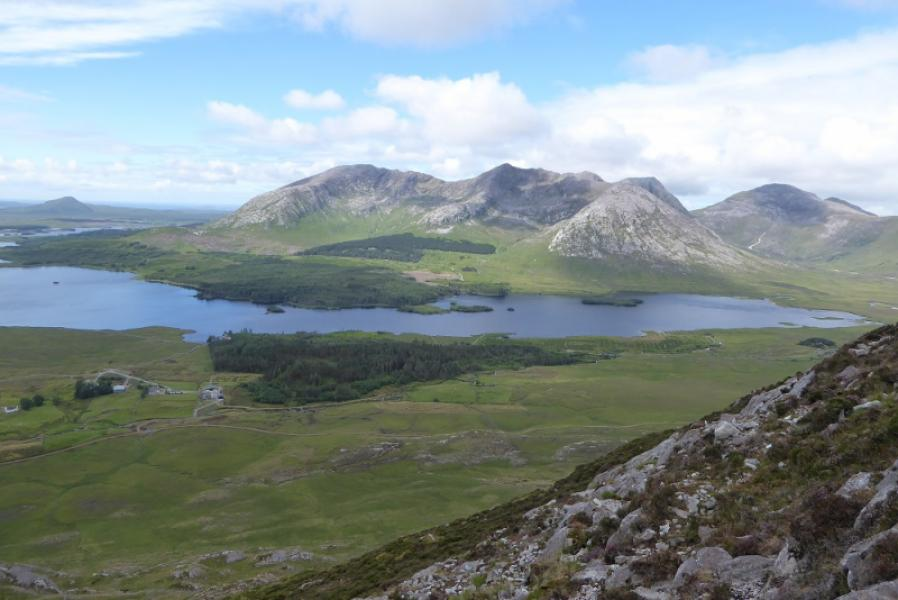
Derryclare (left), Bencorr (centre), Bencorr North Top (right); Benbaun is far right

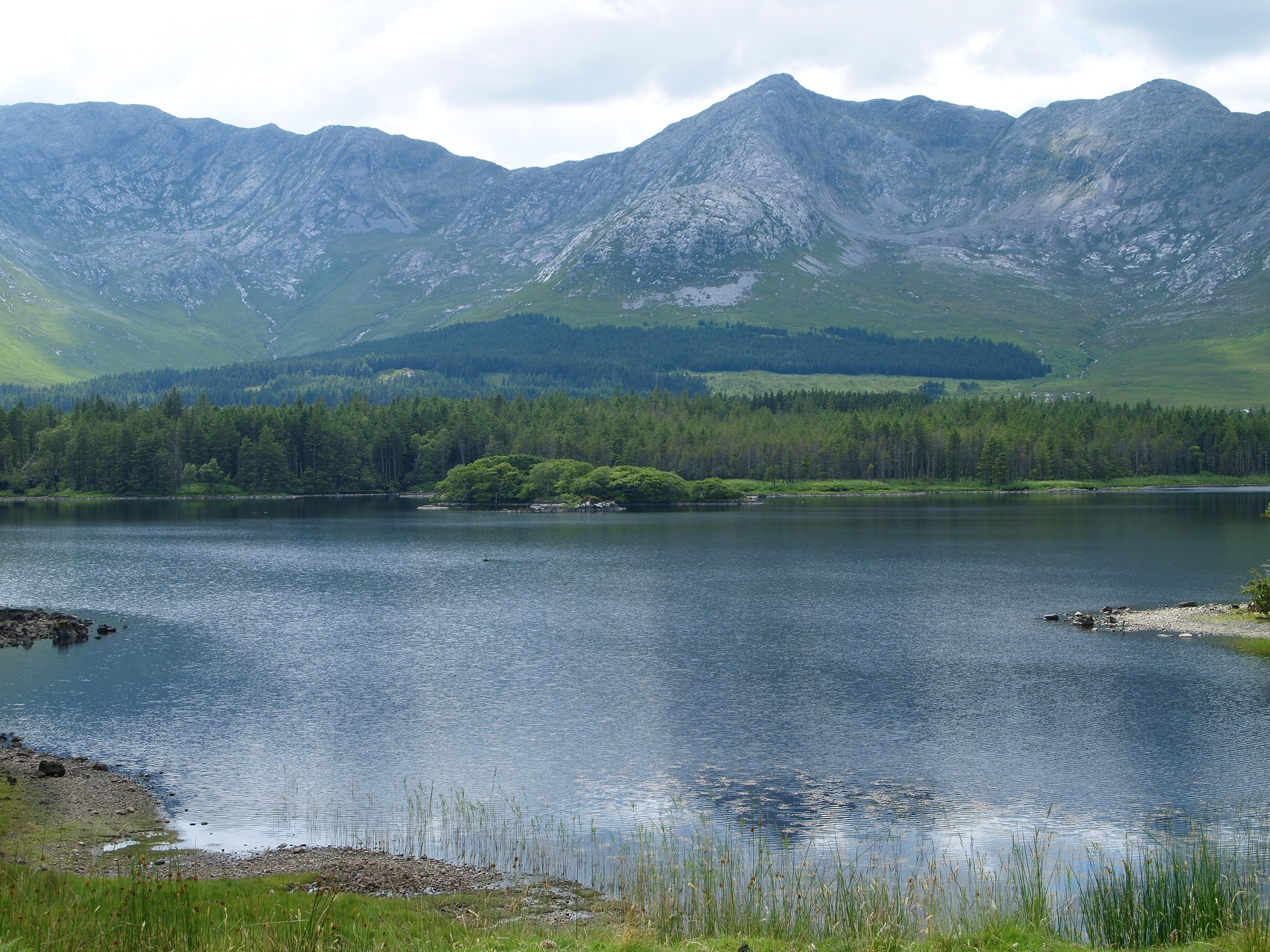
Derryclare (left), Bencorr (centre), and Bencorr North Top (right); with the corries of Log an Choire Mhóir (left) and Log an Choire Bhig (right)

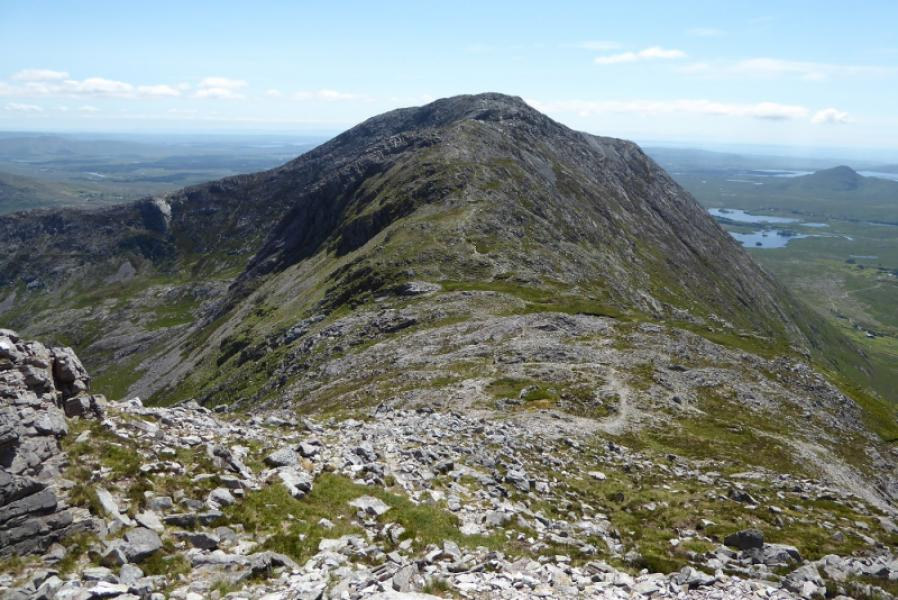
Looking south to the summit of Derryclare from its northern-ridge with Bencorr

== Bibliography ==
- Fairbairn, Helen (2014). Ireland's Best Walks: A Walking Guide. Collins Press. ISBN 978-1848892118.
- MountainViews Online Database (Simon Stewart) (2013). A Guide to Ireland's Mountain Summits: The Vandeleur-Lynams & the Arderins. Collins Books. ISBN 978-1-84889-164-7.
- Paul Phelan (2011). Connemara & Mayo - A Walking Guide: Mountain, Coastal & Island Walks. Collins Press. ISBN 978-1848891029.
- Dillion, Paddy (2001). Connemara: Collins Rambler's guide. Harper Collins. ISBN 978-0002201216.
- Dillion, Paddy (1993). The Mountains of Ireland: A Guide to Walking the Summits. Cicerone. ISBN 978-1852841102.

== See also ==
- Twelve Bens
- Mweelrea, major range in Killary Harbour
- Maumturks, major range in Connemara
- Lists of mountains in Ireland
- Lists of mountains and hills in the British Isles
- List of Marilyns in the British Isles
- List of Hewitt mountains in England, Wales and Ireland
