= R344 road (Ireland) =

Road in Ireland

Coordinates: 53.518716°N 9.739622°W

R344 road
- Bóthar R344
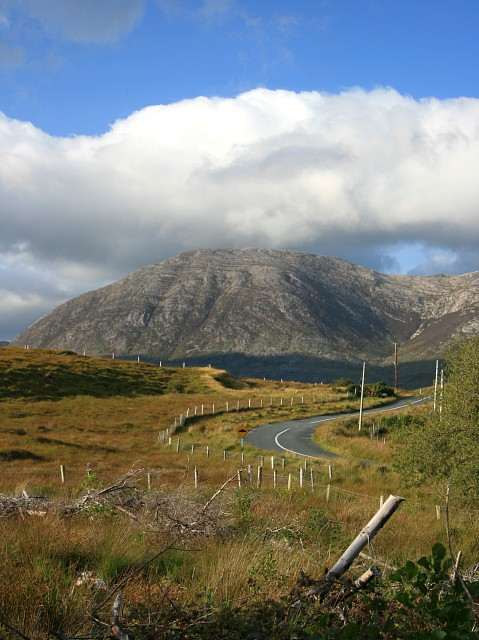
- R344 running northwards, with Letterbreckaun in the background

Route information
- Length: 14.8 km (9.2 mi)

Major junctions
- From: N59 Kylemore
- Crosses Gleninagh River; Passes Lough Inagh
- To: N59 Lissoughter (west of Recess)

Location
- Country: Ireland

Highway system
- Roads in Ireland; Motorways; Primary; Secondary; Regional

The R344 road is a regional road in Ireland, located in west County Galway. It cuts off the loop made by the N59 through Clifden and Letterfrack.
