= Bencorr =

Mountain in County Galway, Ireland

- Binn Chorr
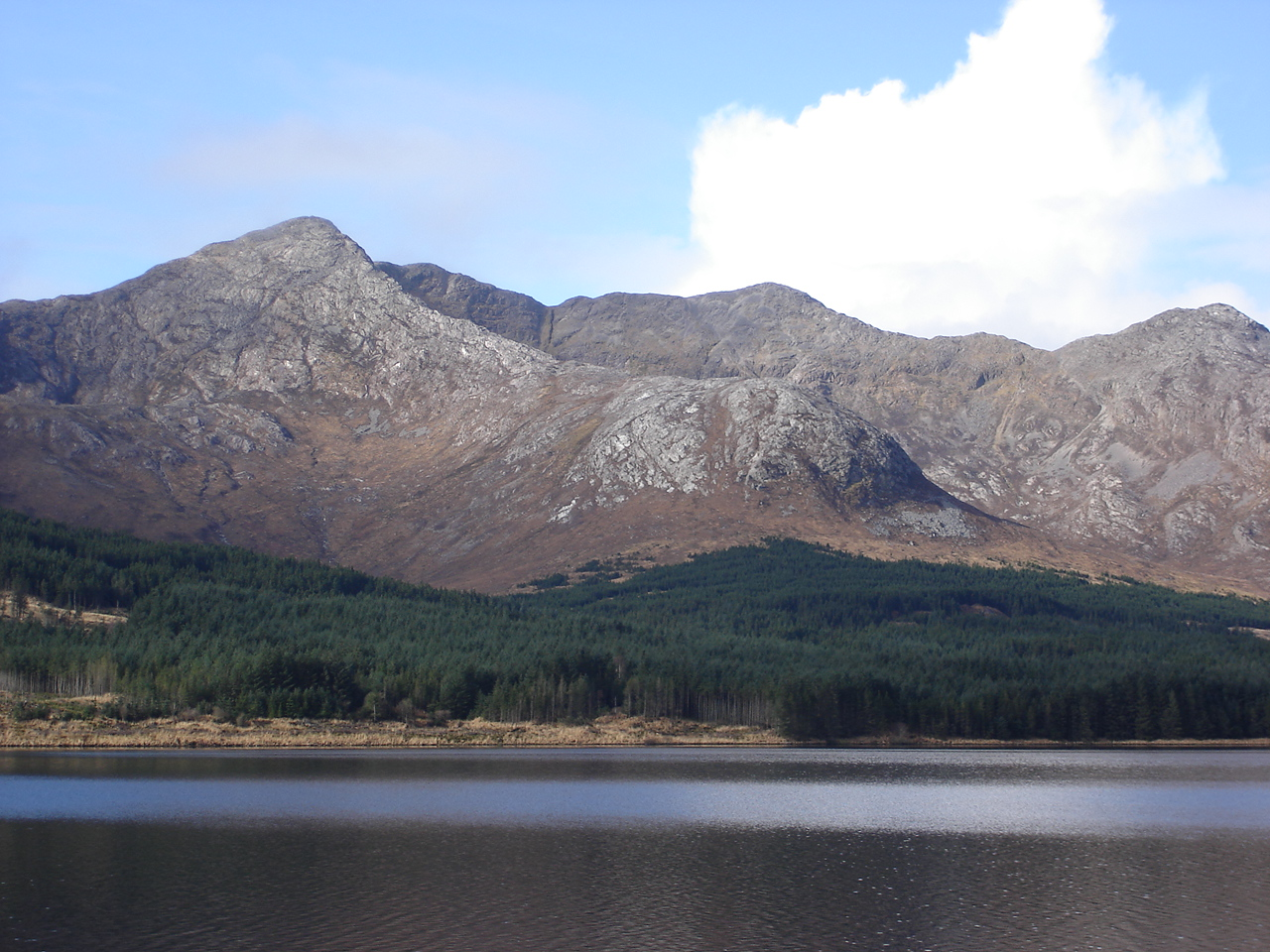
- Bencorr (left) and its subsidiary peaks, and two easterly spurs, from across Lough Inagh.

Highest point
- Elevation: 711 m (2,333 ft)
- Prominence: 306 m (1,004 ft)
- Listing: 100 Highest Irish Mountains, Marilyn, Hewitt, Arderin, Simm, Vandeleur-Lynam
- Coordinates: 53°30′N 9°48′W

Naming
- English translation: pointed peak
- Language of name: Irish

Geography
- Location within Ireland
- Location: County Galway, Ireland
- Parent range: Twelve Bens
- OSI/OSNI grid: L8116652200
- Topo map: OSi Discovery 37

Geology
- Rock type(s): Pale quartzites, grits, graphitic top bedrock

Bencorr (Irish: Binn Chorr, meaning 'pointed peak') at 711 metres (2,333 ft), is the 82nd–highest peak in Ireland on the Arderin scale, and the 102nd–highest peak on the Vandeleur-Lynam scale. Bencorr is situated near the centre of the core massif of the Twelve Bens mountain range in the Connemara National Park in County Galway, Ireland. It is the second-tallest mountain of the Twelve Bens range, after Benbaun 729 metres (2,392 ft); it lies close to Benbaun, separated only by the third-highest mountain in the range of Bencollaghduff 696 metres (2,283 ft), and the col of Maumina.

== Naming ==
An alternative name for the mountain is Binn an Choire Mhóir, meaning "peak of the big corrie". Binn an tSaighdiúra, the "peak of the soldier", is said to have acquired its name after a sapper working for the Ordnance Survey fell to his death here.

== Geography ==
Bencorr sits on its own mini-massif and is linked by a short high rocky north-eastern ridge to Bencorr North Top at 690 metres (2,260 ft), which gives Bencorr the profile of a "double summit" when viewed from a distance. One of Bencorr's more distinctive features is its long rocky north-easterly spur, known as Carrot Ridge (Irish: Meacan Buí), on which sits the subsidiary peaks of Binn an tSaighdiúra 653 metres (2,142 ft) (whose prominence of only eight metres, making it an easy peak to miss), and at the far end of the spur, Bencorrbeg 577 metres (1,893 ft).

Bencorr (and Bencorr North Top) lie at the junction of two major glaciated U-shaped valleys. To the northeast is the Gleninagh Valley, from which the Gleninagh river flows; to the west of Bencorr is the glaciated valley of the Glencoaghan River, which is bounded by several Bens.

Bencorr has two eastern corries. The southern and larger corrie lies between the summit of Derryclare and Bencorr and is known as Log an Choire Mhóir, the "hollow of the big corrie", while the northern and smaller corrie lies between the summit of Bencorr and Bencorr North Top and is known as Log an Choire Bhig, the "hollow of the small corrie". Both corries lead down into the Derryclare Wood and Lough Inagh.

Bencorr's prominence of 306 metres (1,004 ft) qualifies it as a Marilyn, and it also ranks it as the 48th-highest mountain in Ireland on the MountainViews Online Database, 100 Highest Irish Mountains, where the minimum prominence threshold is 100 metres.

== Hill walking ==
The most straightforward route to climb Bencorr either via the pass of Maumina by walking up the Gleninagh valley, or by staying on higher ground by first climbing Bencorrbeg and then traversing Carrot Ridge to the summit; both routes total over 9-kilometres and 4–5 hours of walking.

A larger horseshoe-type route can be formed from an 11–14 kilometre, 5–7 hour circuit of Derryclare and Bencorr, and either descending Bencorr's small spur between its two corries, or continuing on to Bencorr North Top and descending via Carrot Ridge.

Bencorr is also climbed as part of the popular 16–kilometre, 8–9 hour Glencoaghan Horseshoe, considered one of the best ridge walks in Ireland. Bencorr is also climbed as part of the Gleninagh Horseshoe, a 15–kilometre, 8–9 hour route around the Gleninagh River usually done counter-clockwise starting at Knockpasheemore and ending at Bencorrbeg;

== Rock climbing ==
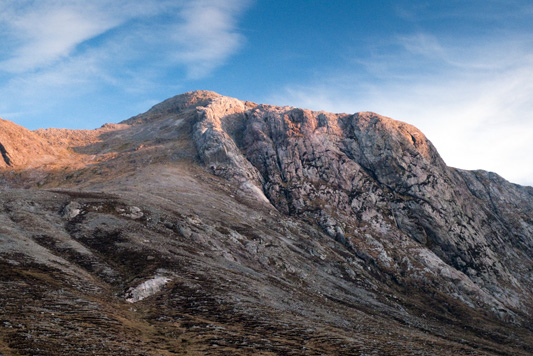
Carrot Ridge, Bencorrbeg.

Bencorr's northeast rocky spur, Carrot Ridge, is an important rock-climbing venue in Connemara with multi-pitch rock-climbs with grades varying from Diff (D) to Very Severe (VS), and length ranging from 150 to 320 metres. Classic climbing routes include Carrot Ridge (275m D), and Seventh Heaven (330m HS).

Tempan notes that there are records of Carrot Ridge being climbed as far back as 1933 by students from Cambridge University, however the route (and the entire ridge) was named "Carrot Ridge" by Irish climber Joss Lynam who mistakenly believed that their ascent in 1949 was the first-ever ascent of the route.

The large easterly corrie between the summits of Derryclare and the summit of Bencorr, Log an Choire Mhóir, also contains several large 200 metre multi-pitch graded rock climbs at grades of Diff (D) to Very Diff (VD), the most notable of which is The Knave (VD, 225 m); and the smaller corrie between the summit of Bencorr and the summit of Bencorr North Top, Log an Choire Bhig, has a number of shorter but harder climbs including Corner Climb (VS 4c, 30 m).

== Gallery ==
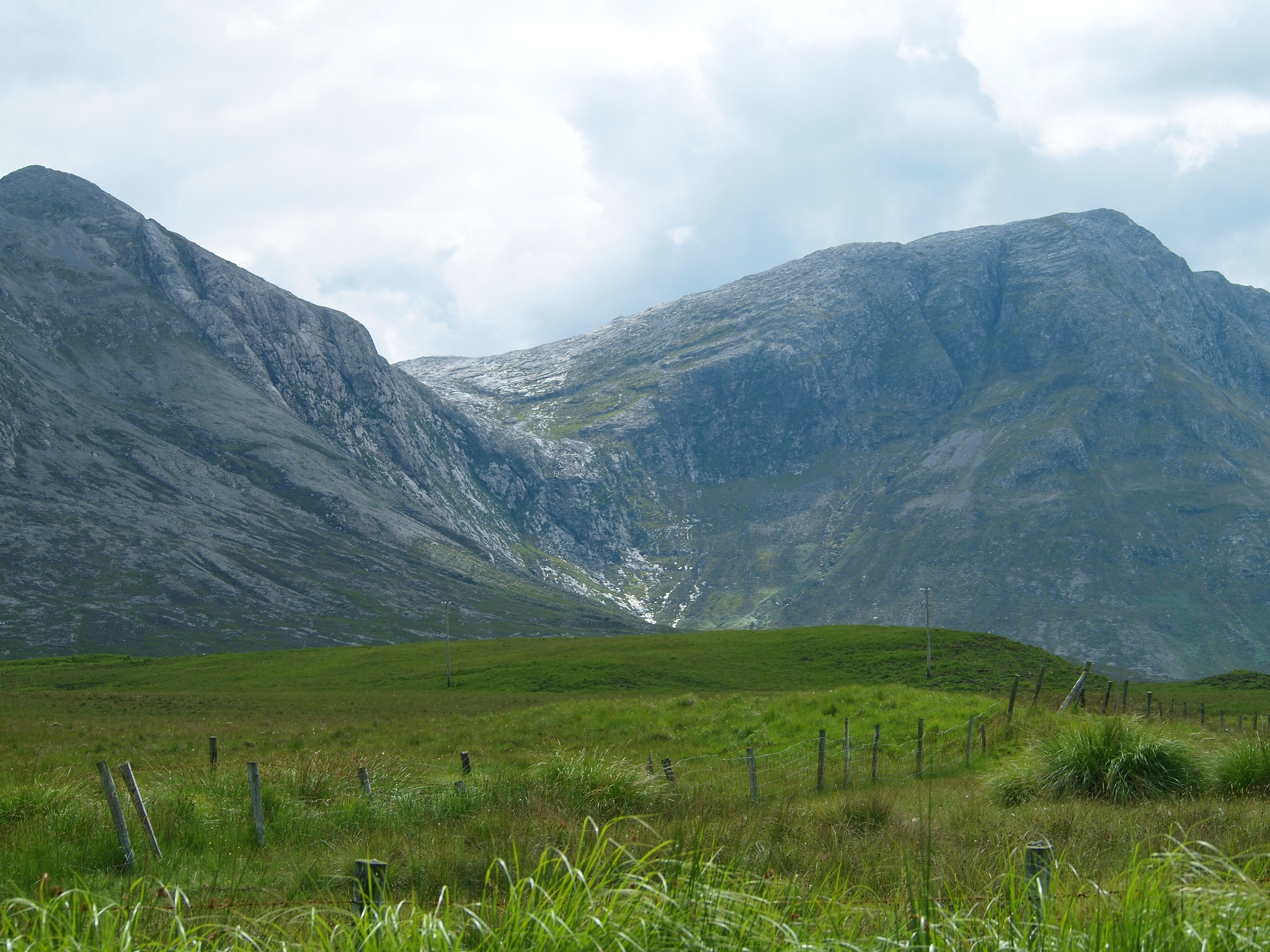
Carrot Ridge, with Bencorrbeg (l), and Binn an tSaighdiúra and Bencorr N Top (r)

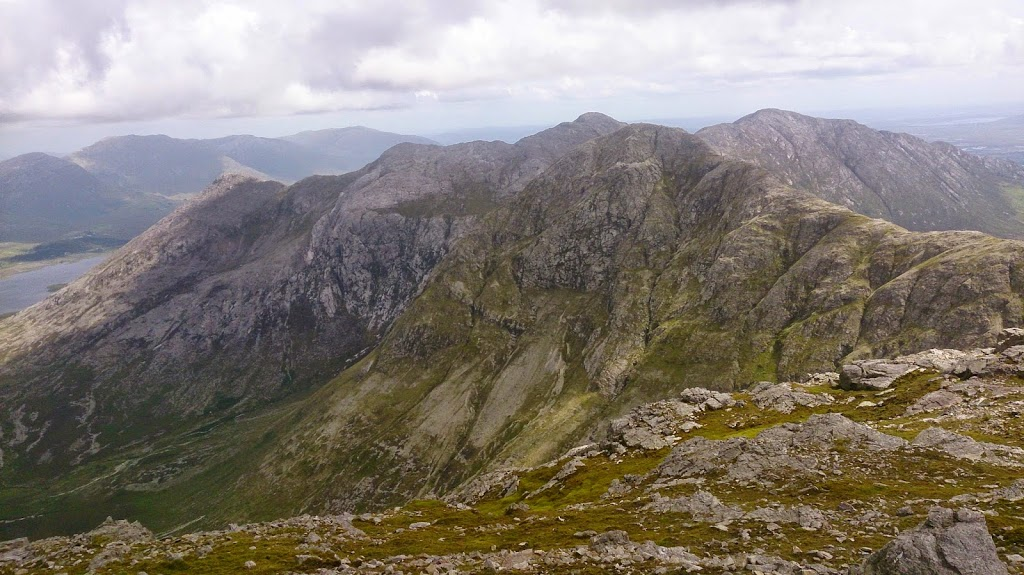
View from Benbaun to Bencollaghduff (c), and ridge to Bencorr and Derryclare behind

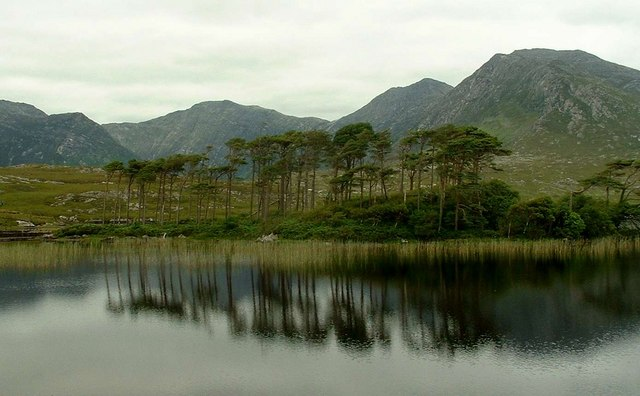
View into Glencaghan and summits of (r-to-l) Derryclare, Bencorr, and Bencollaghduff

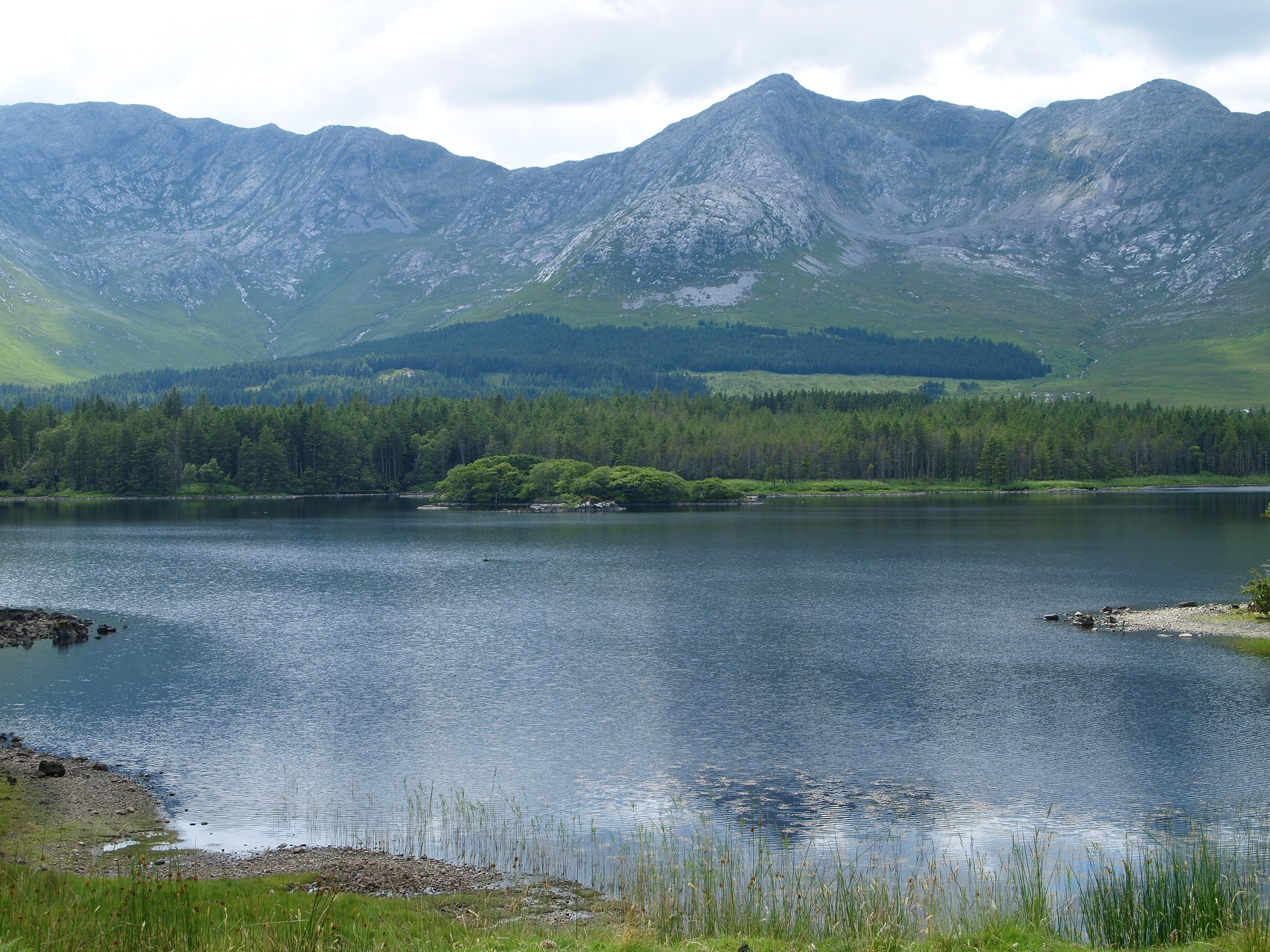
Lough Inagh, Derryclare (l), Bencorr (c), Bencorr N Top (r)

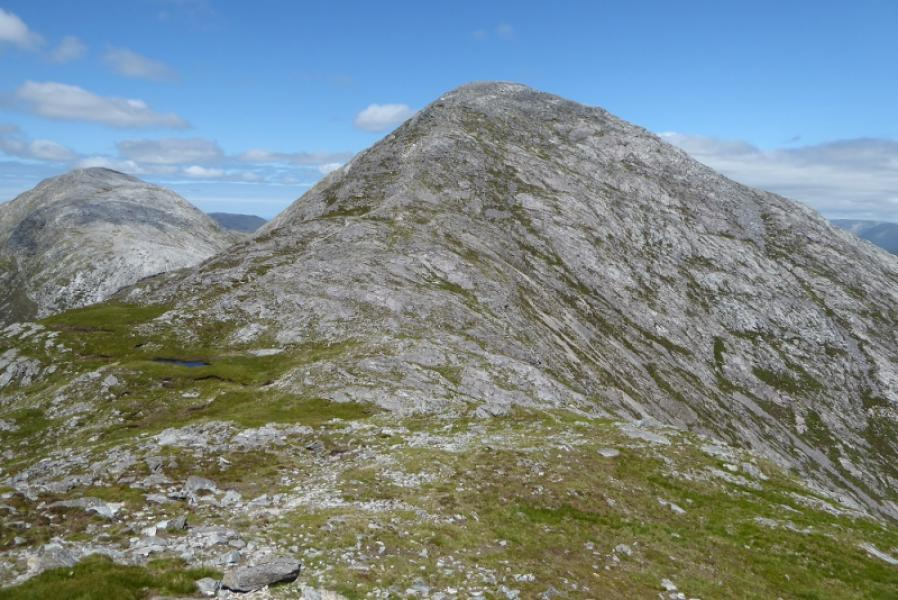
Bencorr (c), with Bencollaghduff (back left), from Derryclare

== Bibliography ==
- Fairbairn, Helen (2014). Ireland's Best Walks: A Walking Guide. Collins Press. ISBN 978-1848892118.
- MountainViews Online Database (Simon Stewart) (2013). A Guide to Ireland's Mountain Summits: The Vandeleur-Lynams & the Arderins. Collins Books. ISBN 978-1-84889-164-7.
- Paul Phelan (2011). Connemara & Mayo - A Walking Guide: Mountain, Coastal & Island Walks. Collins Press. ISBN 978-1848891029.
- Dillion, Paddy (2001). Connemara: Collins Rambler's guide. Harper Collins. ISBN 978-0002201216.
- Dillion, Paddy (1993). The Mountains of Ireland: A Guide to Walking the Summits. Cicerone. ISBN 978-1852841102.

== See also ==
- Twelve Bens
- Mweelrea, major range in Killary Harbour
- Maumturks, major range in Connemara
- Lists of mountains in Ireland
- Lists of mountains and hills in the British Isles
- List of Marilyns in the British Isles
- List of Hewitt mountains in England, Wales and Ireland
