= Bencollaghduff =

Mountain in County Galway, Ireland

- Binn Dubh
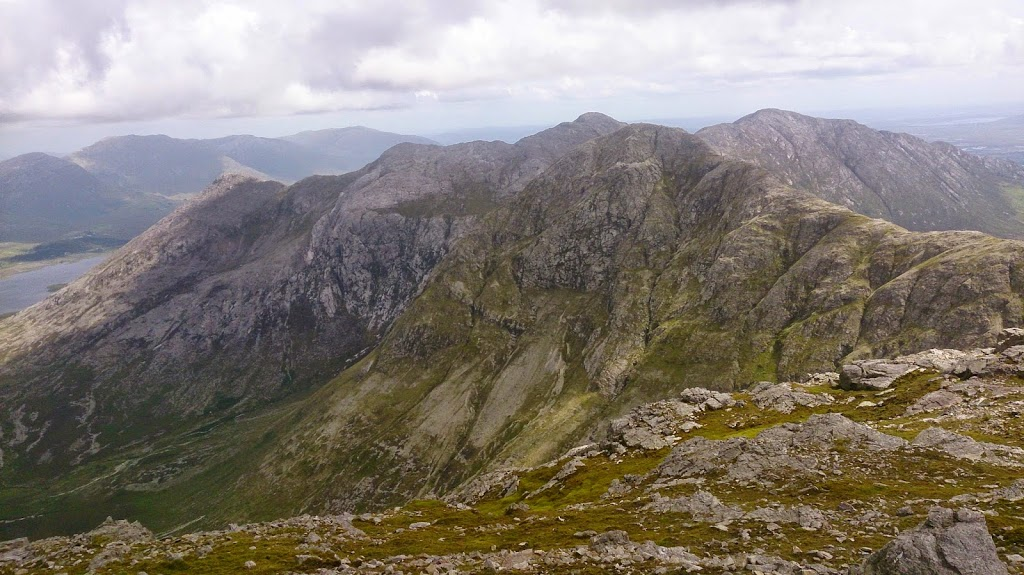
- Bencollaghduff viewed from Benbaun, with Bencorr and Derryclare behind

Highest point
- Elevation: 696 m (2,283 ft)
- Prominence: 191 m (627 ft)
- Listing: 100 Highest Irish Mountains, Marilyn, Hewitt, Arderin, Simm, Vandeleur-Lynam
- Coordinates: 53°30′48.23″N 9°48′46.08″W

Naming
- English translation: black mountain or peak of hags [cormorants]
- Language of name: Irish

Geography
- Location within Ireland
- Location: County Galway, Ireland
- Parent range: Twelve Bens
- OSI/OSNI grid: L7978252992
- Topo map: OSi Discovery 37

Geology
- Rock type(s): Pale quartzites, grits, graphitic Bedrock

Bencollaghduff (Irish: Binn Dubh, meaning 'black mountain/peak of hags') at 696 metres (2,283 ft), is the 93rd–highest peak in Ireland on the Arderin scale, and the 115th–highest peak on the Vandeleur-Lynam scale. Bencollaghduff is situated near the centre of the core massif of the Twelve Bens mountain range in the Connemara National Park in County Galway, Ireland. It is the 3rd tallest mountain of the Twelve Bens range, after Benbaun 729 metres (2,392 ft), to which it is connected by the northern col of Maumina; and after Bencorr 711 metres (2,333 ft), to which it is connected by a high southeast rocky ridge.

Bencollaghduff's prominence of 191 metres (627 ft) qualifies it as a Marilyn, and it also ranks it as the 56th-highest mountain in Ireland on the MountainViews Online Database, 100 Highest Irish Mountains, where the minimum prominence threshold is 100 metres.

== Naming ==
According to Irish academic Paul Tempan, "Bencollaghduff" most likely means "peak of the black hags", however, the hags in question are cormorant birds and not witch-like characters. Tempan notes that the Ordnance Survey Ireland form of "Binn Dhubh" is a prescribed standard modern Irish form. Cartographer Tim Robinson's maps of Connemara uses "Binn Dubh", which represents the local dialect.

== Hill walking ==
Bencollaghduff is often climbed as part of the popular 16–kilometre 8–9 hour Glencoaghan Horseshoe, considered one of Ireland's best hill-walks. Bencollaghduff is also climbed as part of the even longer Owenglin Horseshoe, a 20–kilometre 10–12 hour route around the Owenglin River taking in over twelve summits;

== In literature ==
The Irish novelist Joseph O'Connor in his award-winning novel Star of the Sea, cites the quarzite shale on the slopes of Bencollaghduff.

== Gallery ==
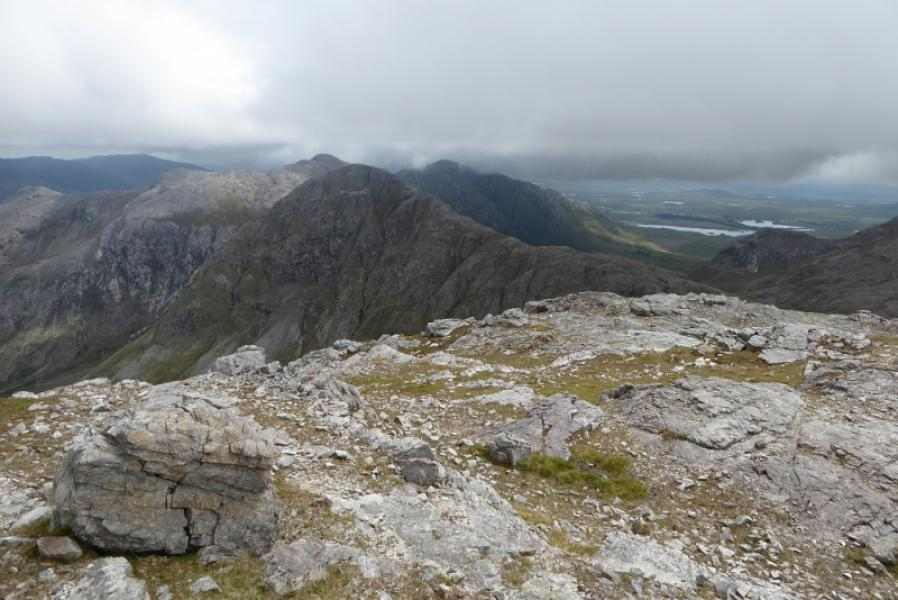
View from south ridge of Benbaun to Bencollaghduff, with ridge to Bencorr and Derryclare behind

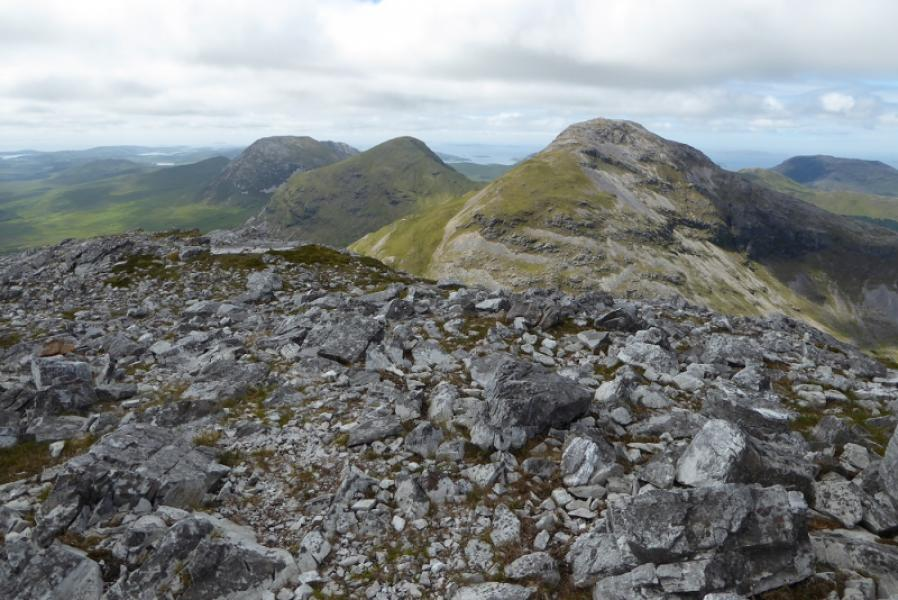
View of (r-to-l) Benbaun, Muckanaght and Bencullagh from the summit of Bencollaghduff

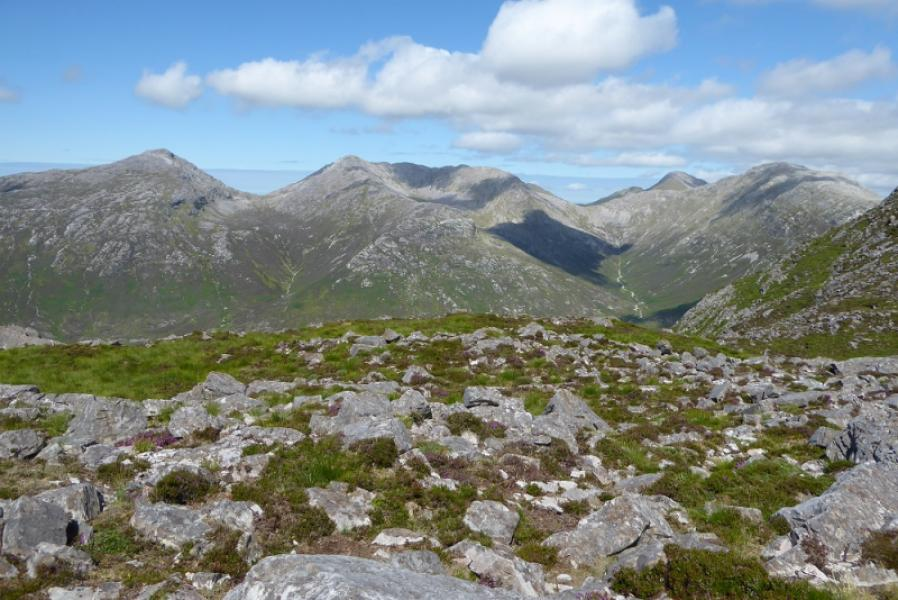
View of (l-to-r), Bengower, Benbreen, and Bencollaghduff from the summit of Derryclare

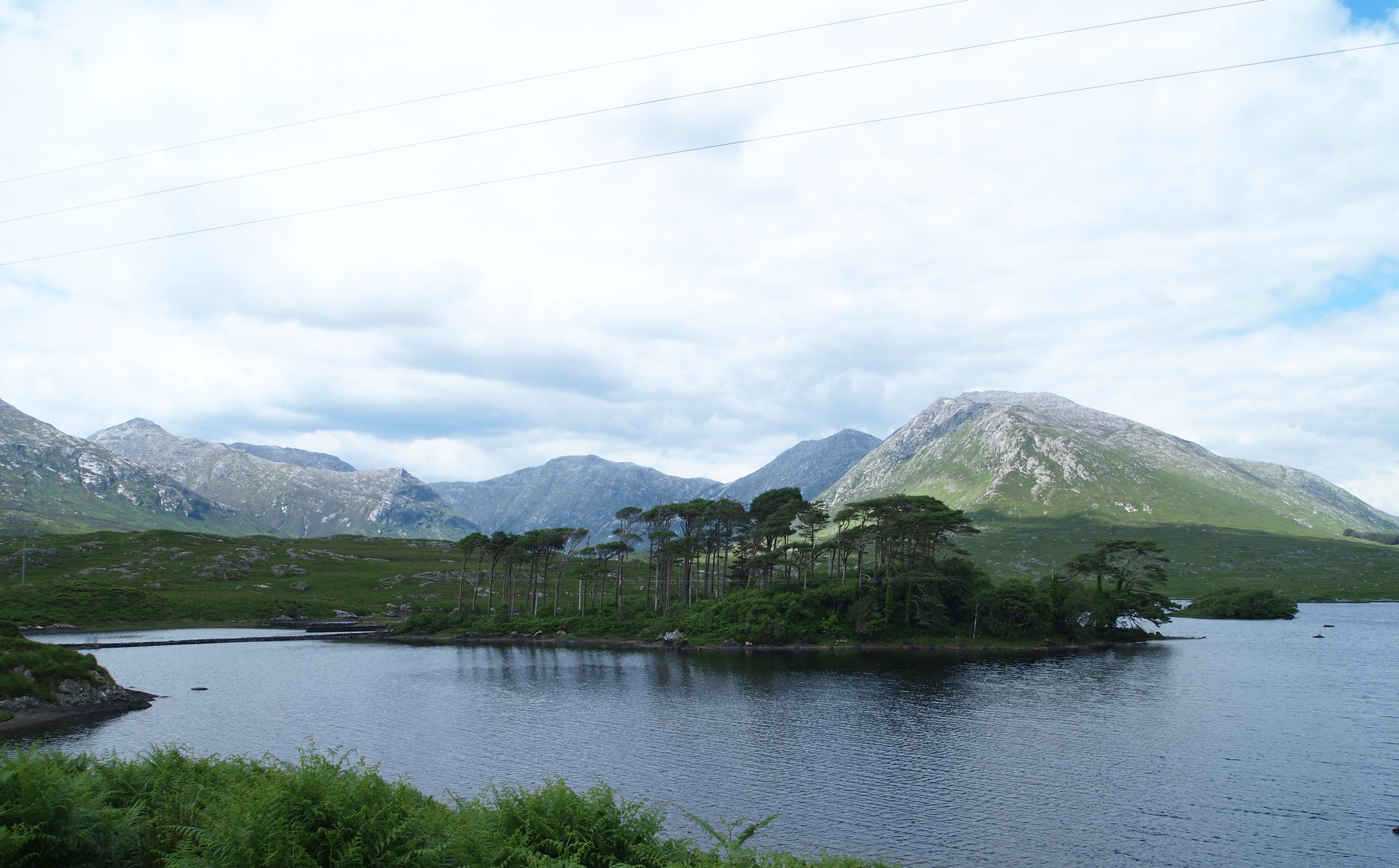
View into the Glencoaghan Horseshoe with the long summit ridge of Bencolloughduff (back, centre)

== Bibliography ==
- Fairbairn, Helen (2014). Ireland's Best Walks: A Walking Guide. Collins Press. ISBN 978-1848892118.
- MountainViews Online Database (Simon Stewart) (2013). A Guide to Ireland's Mountain Summits: The Vandeleur-Lynams & the Arderins. Collins Books. ISBN 978-1-84889-164-7.
- Dillion, Paddy (2001). Connemara: Collins Rambler's guide. Harper Collins. ISBN 978-0002201216.
- Dillion, Paddy (1993). The Mountains of Ireland: A Guide to Walking the Summits. Cicerone. ISBN 978-1852841102.

== See also ==
- Twelve Bens
- Mweelrea, major range in Killary Harbour
- Maumturks, major range in Connemara
- Lists of mountains in Ireland
- Lists of mountains and hills in the British Isles
- List of Marilyns in the British Isles
- List of Hewitt mountains in England, Wales and Ireland
