= Benbaun =

Mountain in County Galway, Ireland

- Binn Bhán
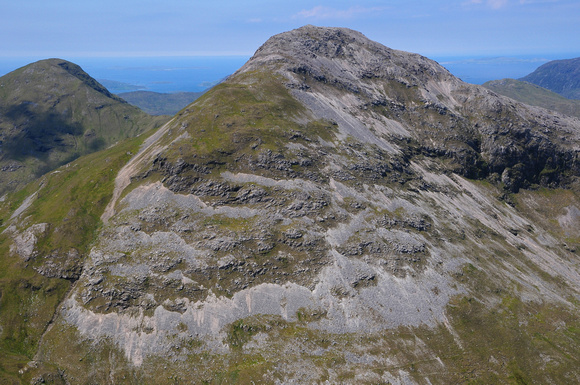
- Summit and south face of Benbaun, as viewed from Bencollaghduff; Muckanaght is back left

Highest point
- Elevation: 729 m (2,392 ft)
- Prominence: 684 m (2,244 ft)
- Listing: P600, County top (Galway), 100 Highest Irish Mountains, Marilyn, Hewitt, Arderin, Simm, Vandeleur-Lynam
- Coordinates: 53°31′16″N 9°49′52″W

Naming
- English translation: White Mountain
- Language of name: Irish

Geography
- Location within island of Ireland
- Location: County Galway, Ireland
- Parent range: Twelve Bens
- OSI/OSNI grid: L7855853903
- Topo map: OSi Discovery 37

Geology
- Rock type(s): Pale quartzites, grits, graphitic Bedrock

Benbaun (Irish: Binn Bhán, meaning 'white peak') is a mountain in County Galway, Ireland. With a height of 729 metres (2,392 ft), it is the 72nd highest peak in Ireland on the Arderin scale, and the 88th highest peak on the Vandeleur-Lynam scale. Benbaun is situated at the centre of the core massif of the Twelve Bens mountain range in the Connemara National Park and is the tallest mountain of the Twelve Bens range, and the county top for Galway.

== Naming ==
According to Irish academic Paul Tempan, the "white peak" in the Irish language name derives from the abundance of quartzite rock in the summit of Benbaun. Tempan notes that Benbaun is the "Mont Blanc" of Connemara.

== Geography ==
Benbaun is the highest mountain of the Twelve Bens range, which is situated in the Connemara National Park in west County Galway. Benbaun lies at the centre of the range and is situated in the middle of a long east-west ridge that to the west includes the major Bens of Benfree (Irish: Binn Fraoigh, meaning 'peak of the heather') 638 metres (2,093 ft), Muckanaght (Irish: Muiceanach, meaning 'hill like a pig') 654 metres (2,146 ft), and Bencullagh (Irish: An Chailleach, meaning 'peak of the hag/witch') 632 metres (2,073 ft), and the minor Ben of Maumonght (Irish: Mám Uchta, meaning 'pass of the breast or ridge') 602 metres (1,975 ft), and its subsidiary peak of Maumonght SW Top 454 metres (1,490 ft). To the east is a long flat 3.5-kilometre ridge at the end of which lies the minor Ben of Knockpasheemore (Irish: Binn Charrach, meaning 'rocky peak') 412 metres (1,352 ft) to the far eastern end.

A deep col to the south, known as Maumina (Irish: Mám Eidhneach), connects Benbaun to the summit of Bencollaghduff 696 metres (2,283 ft), and to the southern Bens of the "Glencoaghan Horseshoe" which forms around the Glencoaghan River.

Another deep col to the north, known as Maumnascalpa connects Benfree and Muckanaght to the northern Ben of Benbrack 582 metres (1,909 ft), which sits on its own small massif with the subsidiary peaks of Knockbrack 442 metres (1,450 ft), and another peak named Benbaun, at 447 metres (1,467 ft).

Benbaun sits at the apex of two major glaciated U-shaped valleys. To the east is the Gleninagh Valley (Irish: Gleann Eidhneach), from which the Gleninagh river flows. This valley is bounded by two large long north-easterly rocky spurs, and the southern spur contains "Carrot Ridge" (Irish: Meacan Buí), an important area for rock-climbing in the Bens, with climbs varying from Diff (D) to Very Severe (VS) and ranging from 150 to 320 metres in length. To the south-west is the large valley of the Owenglin river which is bounded by several major Bens on each of its sides.

Benbaun's prominence of 684 metres (2,244 ft) qualifies it as a P600, and a Marilyn, and it also ranks it as the 41st-highest mountain in Ireland on the MountainViews Online Database, 100 Highest Irish Mountains, where the minimum prominence threshold is 100 metres.

== Hill walking ==
The most straightforward route to climb Benbaun either via the pass of Maumina by walking up the Gleninagh valley, or by staying on higher ground by first summiting Knockpasheemore and then traversing the 3.5-kilometre ridge to the summit; both routes total over 9-kilometres and 4–5 hours of walking.

Because Benbaun lies off the very popular 16–kilometre 8–9 hour Glencoaghan Horseshoe, it gets fewer visits despite being the tallest Ben in the range. However, Benbaun sits close to the apex of three other well-regarded "horseshoe climbs" of equivalent difficulty in the Bens:

1. Owenglin Horseshoe: 20–kilometre 10–12 hour route around the Owenglin River to the west of Benbaun, taking in over twelve summits;
2. Gleninagh Horseshoe: 15–kilometre 8–9 hour route around the Gleninagh River usually done counter-clockwise starting at Knockpasheemore (long northeastern spur of Benbaun) and ending at Bencorrbeg (via the Carrot Ridge);
3. Glencorbet Horseshoe: 14–kilometre 6–7 hour circuit of Kylemore River, usually done counter-clockwise starting at Benbaun (477 metres), and ending at Knockpasheemore.

== Gallery ==
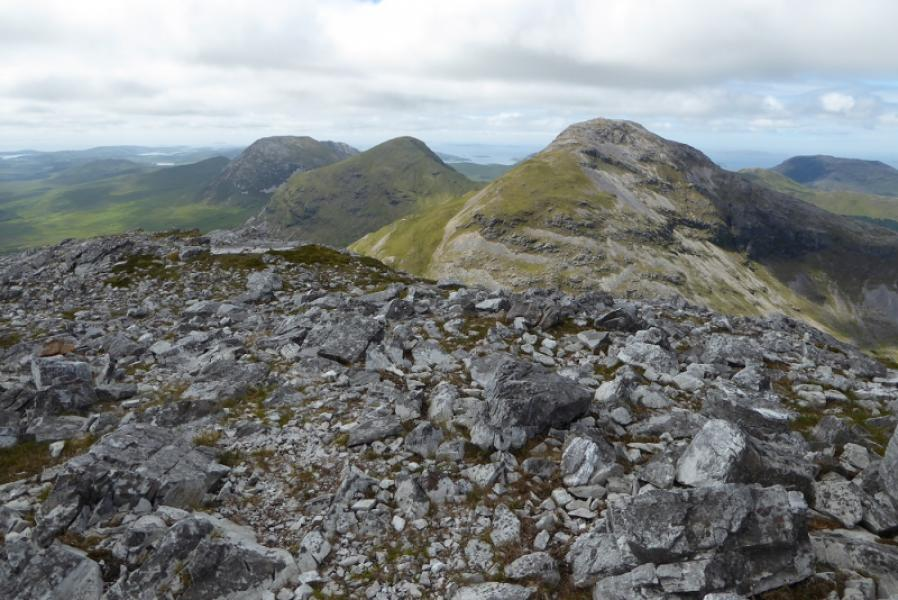
(l-to-r) Bencullagh, Muckanaght and Benbaun, viewed from Bencollaghduff

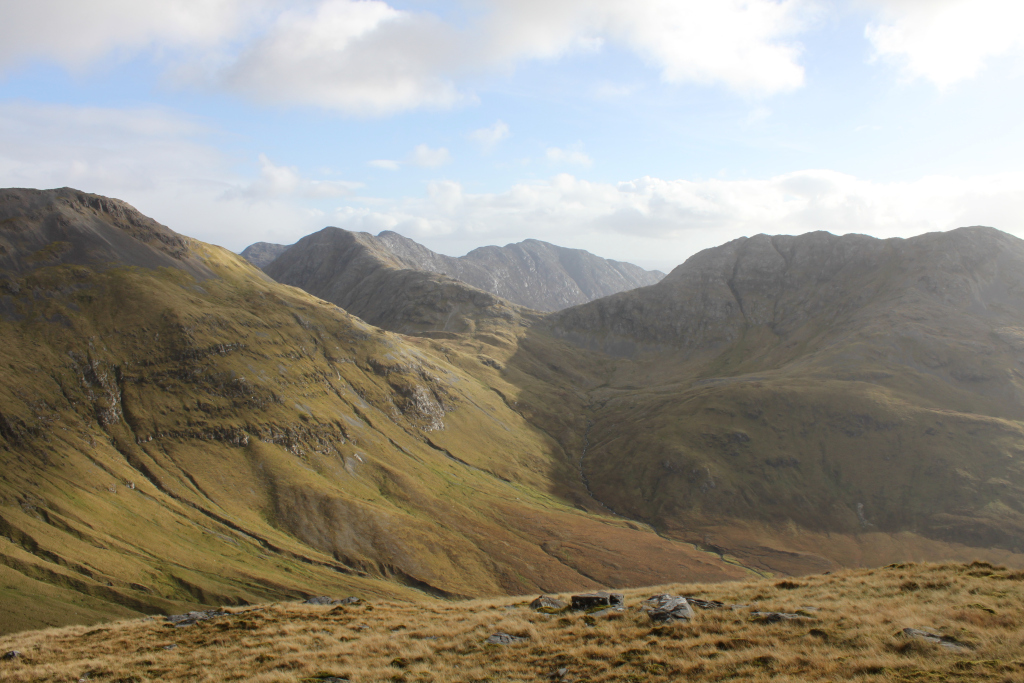
Intersection of Benbaun, Bencollaghduff and Benbreen, viewed from Muckanaght

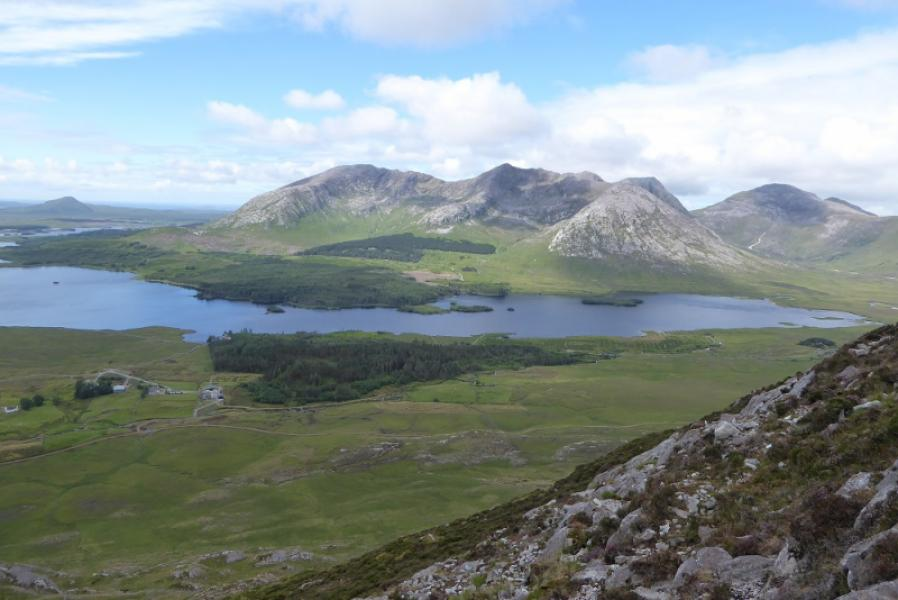
(l-to-r) Derryclare, Bencorr, and Benbaun, viewed from Letterbreckaun

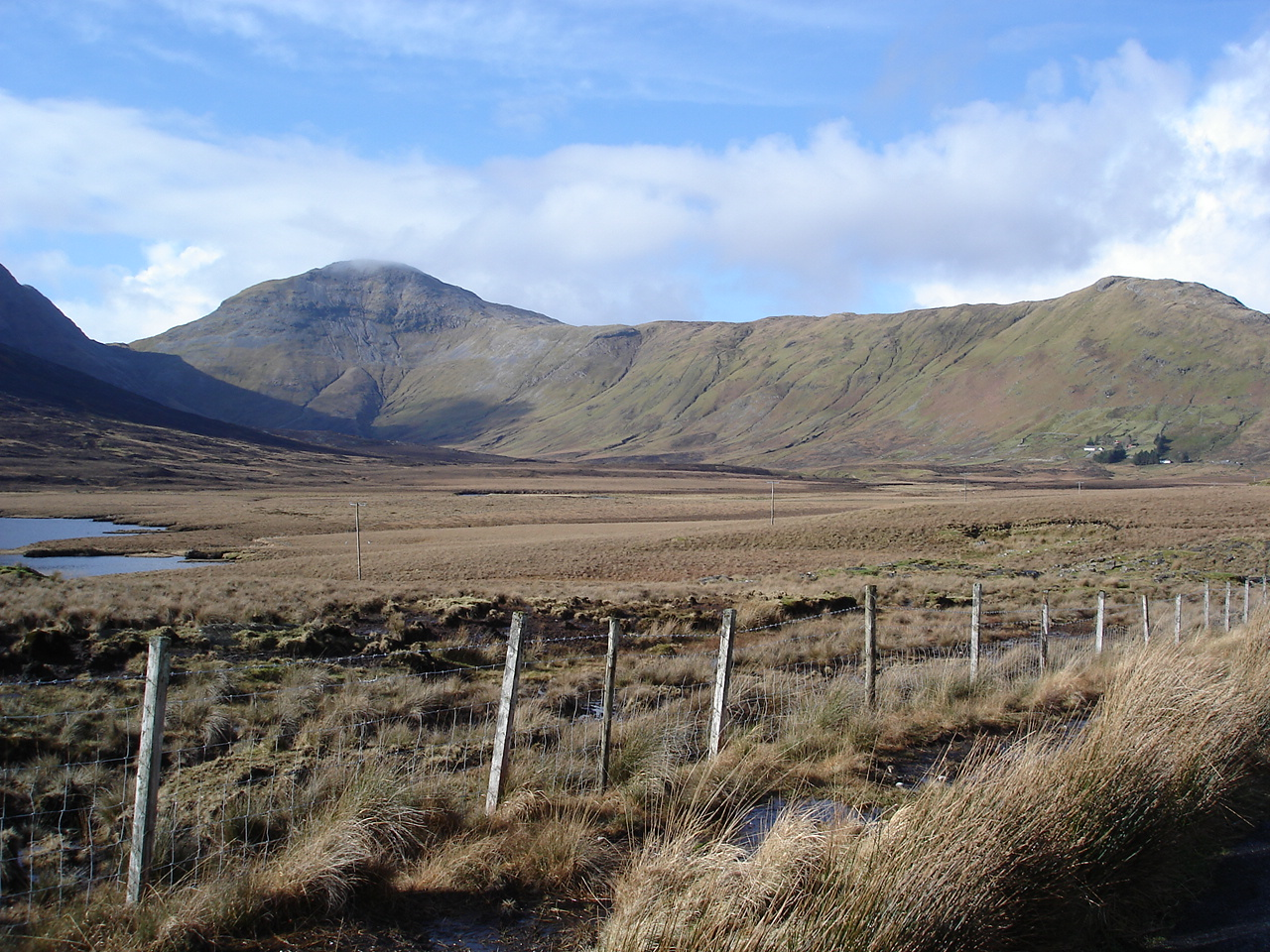
Benbaun (left) and the long easterly ridge to Knockpasheemore (right)

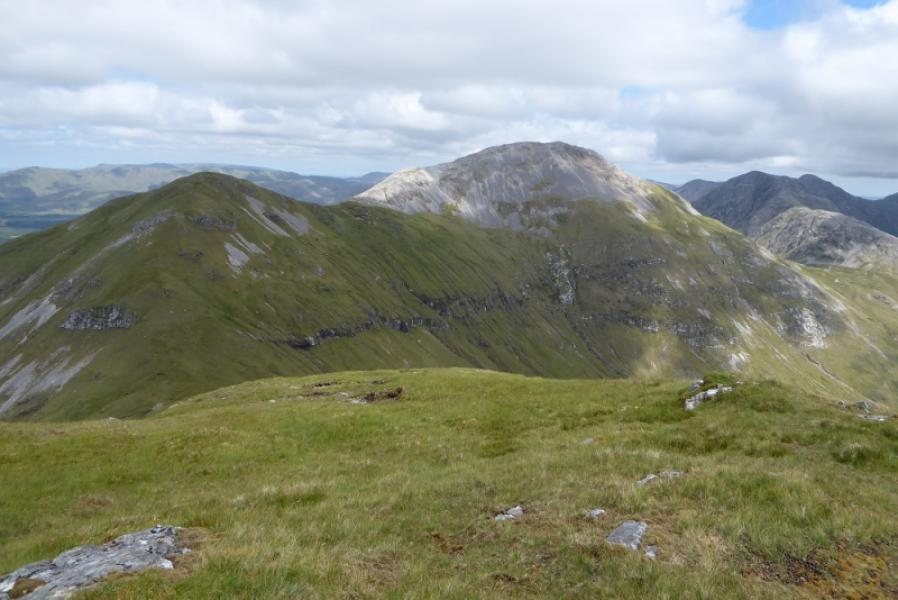
Benfree (left) and Benbaun (right), viewed from summit of Muckanaght

== Bibliography ==
- Fairbairn, Helen (2014). Ireland's Best Walks: A Walking Guide. Collins Press. ISBN 978-1848892118.
- MountainViews Online Database (Simon Stewart) (2013). A Guide to Ireland's Mountain Summits: The Vandeleur-Lynams & the Arderins. Collins Books. ISBN 978-1-84889-164-7.
- Paul Phelan (2011). Connemara & Mayo - A Walking Guide: Mountain, Coastal & Island Walks. Collins Press. ISBN 978-1848891029.
- Dillion, Paddy (2001). Connemara: Collins Rambler's guide. Harper Collins. ISBN 978-0002201216.
- Dillion, Paddy (1993). The Mountains of Ireland: A Guide to Walking the Summits. Cicerone. ISBN 978-1852841102.

== See also ==
- Twelve Bens
- Mweelrea, major range in Killary Harbour
- Maumturks, major range in Connemara
- List of Irish counties by highest point
- Lists of mountains in Ireland
- Lists of mountains and hills in the British Isles
- List of P600 mountains in the British Isles
- List of Marilyns in the British Isles
- List of Hewitt mountains in England, Wales and Ireland
