= Owenmore River =

Owenmore River may refer to:

- Owenmore River (Connemara), a river in Connemara, in County Galway, Ireland
- Owenmore River (County Mayo), a river in County Mayo, Ireland
- Owenmore River (County Sligo), a river in County Sligo, Ireland
- Owenmore River (County Cavan), a river in County Cavan, Ireland

== See also ==
- An Abhainn Mhór (disambiguation), Irish name from which the above rivers' names are derived
