= Benglenisky =

Mountain in County Galway, Ireland

- Binn Ghleann Uisce
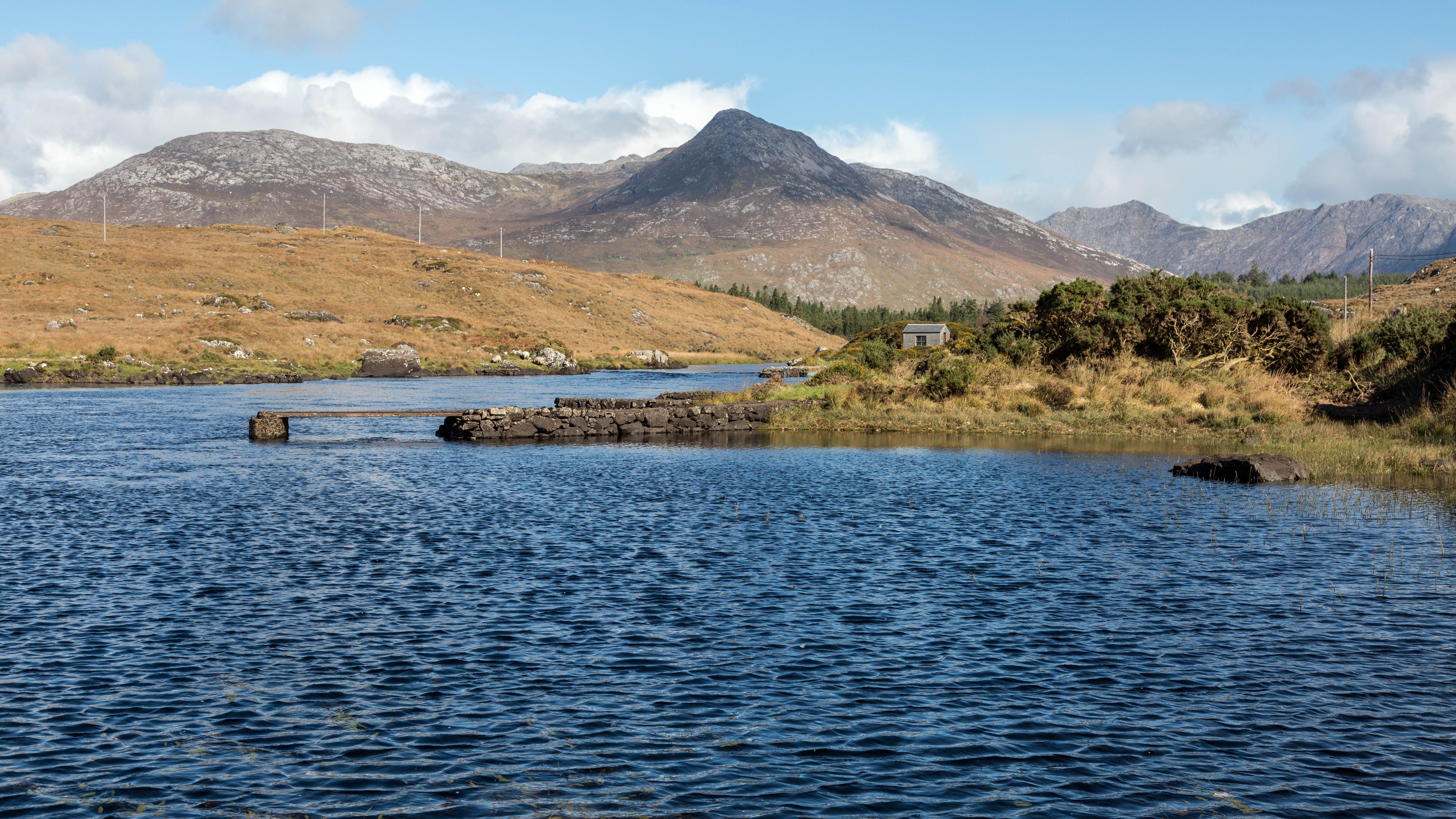
- Benglenisky (left), and Benlettery (centre), from the Ballynahinch Castle fishery

Highest point
- Elevation: 516 m (1,693 ft)
- Prominence: 48 m (157 ft)
- Listing: Arderin
- Coordinates: 53°29′11″N 9°51′34″W

Naming
- English translation: Peak of the Wet Hillsides
- Language of name: Irish

Geography
- Location within Ireland
- Location: County Galway, Ireland
- Parent range: Twelve Bens
- OSI/OSNI grid: L7661650065
- Topo map: OSi Discovery 37

Geology
- Rock type(s): Pale quartzites, grits, graphitic bedrock

Benglenisky (Irish: Binn Ghleann Uisce, meaning 'Peak of the Glen of the Water') at 516 metres (1,693 ft), is the 368th–highest peak in Ireland on the Arderin scale. Benglenisky is the second most southern peak, after neighbouring Benlettery, of the Twelve Bens mountain range in the Connemara National Park in County Galway, Ireland, and is the lowest of the core Twelve Bens.

== Naming ==
According to Irish academic Paul Tempan, Irish: Gleann Uisce, meaning "the glen of water", is from the glen on the south-east side of this peak. Tempan also notes that on the north-west side in the townland of Irish: Barr na nÓrán, Benglenisky is known as Irish: Binn Dubh (meaning "Black Peak") or Irish: Cnoc Dubh (meaning "Black Hill"). The green Connemara marble is quarried in Barr na nÓrán, which was first started by Thomas Barnwall Martin in the 1820s.

== Geography ==
Benglenisky is the second southernmost peak of the Twelve Bens after Benlettery 577 metres (1,893 ft), and lies at the western edge of the range.

Benglenisky is connected to the range by a high north-easterly ridge to the peak of Bengower 664 metres (2,178 ft); this ridge forms a fork which also connects neighboring Benlettery to Bengower. Benglenisky sits off the main ridge of the six Bens that form a horseshoe around the valley of the Glencoaghan River (also known as the Glencoaghan Horseshoe), and is thus less frequented.

Benglenisky is the lowest of the core Twelve Bens, and only meets the mountain classification of an Arderin. Its relative positioning at the southern end of the range, jutting out on its own ridge, means that it often appears as a scenic backdrop to Ballynahinch Castle and the Ballynahinch Lake, however, it is still overshadowed by its more dramatic neighbour, Benlettery, with its striking "pyramidal" profile.

== Hill walking ==
As with Benlettery, Benglenisky's accessibility means that it can be summited as a standalone 5-kilometre 2-3 hour climb (starting and ending at the Ben Lettery An Oige youth hostel); however, the high ridge Benglenisky shares with the peaks of Bengower and Benlettery, means that it is also climbed as part a 7-kilometre 3-4 hour horseshoe loop-walk with these peaks.

Benglenisky does not feature on the core route of the more famous 16–kilometre 8–9 hour Glencoaghan Horseshoe, considered one of Ireland's best hill-walks; or the even longer Owenglin Horseshoe, a 20–kilometre 10–12 hour route around the Owenglin River taking in over twelve summits.

== Gallery ==
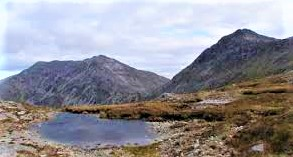
Benbreen (left), and Bengower (right), from summit of Benglenisky

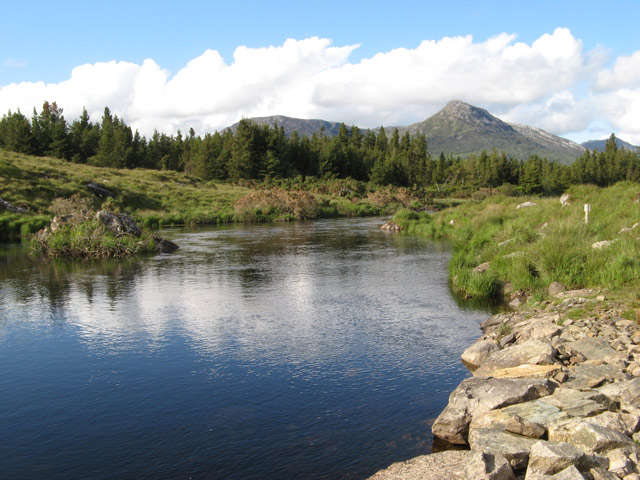
Benlettery (right) and Benglenisky (left), from the Owenmore River

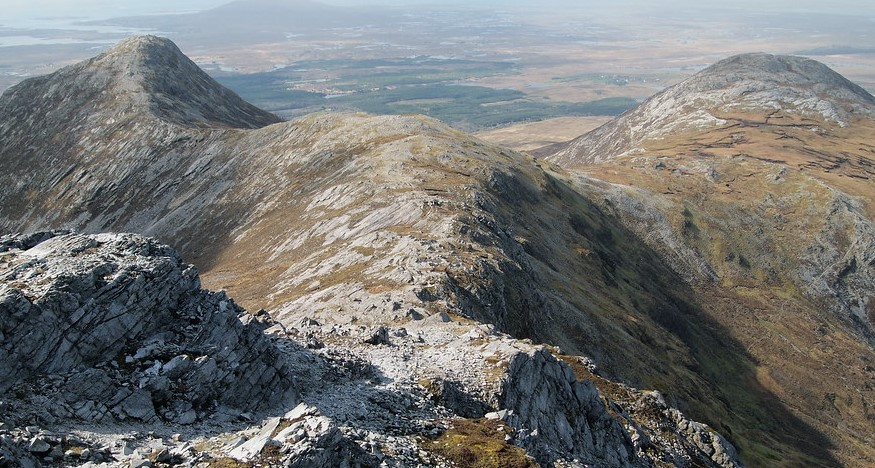
Benlettery (left) and Benglenisky (right) from summit of Bengower

== Bibliography ==
- Fairbairn, Helen (2014). Ireland's Best Walks: A Walking Guide. Collins Press. ISBN 978-1848892118.
- MountainViews Online Database (Simon Stewart) (2013). A Guide to Ireland's Mountain Summits: The Vandeleur-Lynams & the Arderins. Collins Books. ISBN 978-1-84889-164-7.
- Paul Phelan (2011). Connemara & Mayo - A Walking Guide: Mountain, Coastal & Island Walks. Collins Press. ISBN 978-1848891029.
- Dillion, Paddy (2001). Connemara: Collins Rambler's guide. Harper Collins. ISBN 978-0002201216.
- Dillion, Paddy (1993). The Mountains of Ireland: A Guide to Walking the Summits. Cicerone. ISBN 978-1852841102.

== See also ==
- Twelve Bens
- Mweelrea, major range in Killary Harbour
- Maumturks, major range in Connemara
- Lists of mountains in Ireland
