= An Abhainn Mhór =

An Abhainn Mhór (meaning 'the big river') is the Irish name for several rivers etc. in Ireland:

- Avonmore River, flows from the Wicklow Mountains to the Irish Sea at Arklow
- Munster Blackwater, flows from Kerry through counties Cork and Waterford into the Celtic Sea at Youghal Harbour
- A former name for Avoca, County Wicklow, a small town
- Owenmore River (County Mayo), flows from the Nephin Beg Range of mountains into the Atlantic at Tullaghan Bay
- Owenmore River (Connemara), flows from Ballynahinch Lake to Bertraghboy Bay
- Owenmore River (County Sligo), a river in County Sligo
- Owenmore River (County Cavan), a river in County Cavan
