= Bengower =

Mountain in County Galway, Ireland

- Binn Gabhar
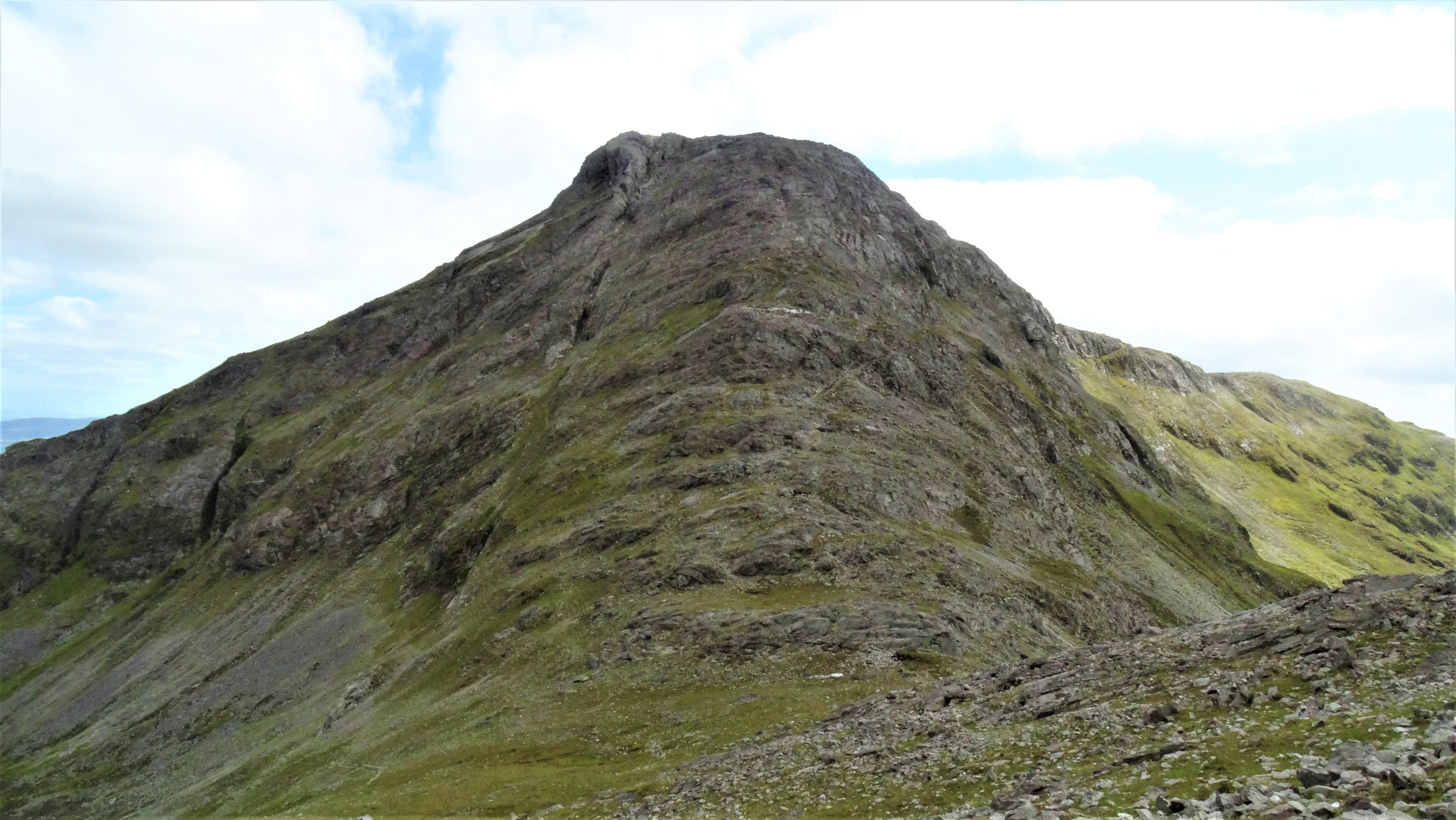
- Summit of Bengower viewed from Benbreen

Highest point
- Elevation: 664 m (2,178 ft)
- Prominence: 196 m (643 ft)
- Listing: 100 Highest Irish Mountains, Marilyn, Hewitt, Arderin, Simm, Vandeleur-Lynam
- Coordinates: 53°29′31″N 9°50′02″W

Naming
- English translation: Goats' Peak
- Language of name: Irish

Geography
- Location within Ireland
- Location: County Galway, Ireland
- Parent range: Twelve Bens
- OSI/OSNI grid: L7830150644
- Topo map: OSi Discovery 37

Geology
- Rock type(s): Pale quartzites, grits, graphitic bedrock

Bengower (Irish: Binn Gabhar, meaning 'Goats' Peak') at 664 metres (2,178 ft), is the 135th–highest peak in Ireland on the Arderin scale, and the 166th–highest peak on the Vandeleur-Lynam scale. Bengower is in the southern end of the Twelve Bens mountain range in the Connemara National Park in County Galway, Ireland, and is the 6th-tallest of the core Twelve Bens.

== Naming ==
Irish academic Paul Tempan notes that there is no evidence as to the origin of the "goat" reference, however, he notes that the mountain was mistakenly labelled as "Glengower" in the popular Discovery Map series.

== Geography ==
Bengower lies between the summits of Benbreen 691 metres (2,267 ft), to the north, and Benlettery 577 metres (1,893 ft), and Benglenisky 517 metres (1,696 ft), to the south. Climbing guidebooks note that its northerly rocky ridge (that rises up from the col of Irish: Mám na Gaoithe, or "pass of the wind" at 470 metres) requires scrambling to reach the summit.

Bengower's prominence of 196 metres (643 ft) qualifies it as a Marilyn, and it also ranks it as the 86th-highest mountain in Ireland in the MountainViews Online Database, 100 Highest Irish Mountains, where the prominence threshold is 100 metres.

== Hill walking ==
Because of its positioning, the more straightforward routes to climb Bengower usually follow a 7-kilometre 3-4 hour horseshoe loop-walk with the neighbouring peaks of Benlettery and Benglenisky.

Bengower is often climbed as part of the popular 16–kilometre 8–9 hour Glencoaghan Horseshoe, considered one of Ireland's best hill-walks. Bengower is also climbed as part of the longer Owenglin Horseshoe, a 20–kilometre 10–12 hour route around the Owenglin River taking in over twelve summits.

== Gallery ==
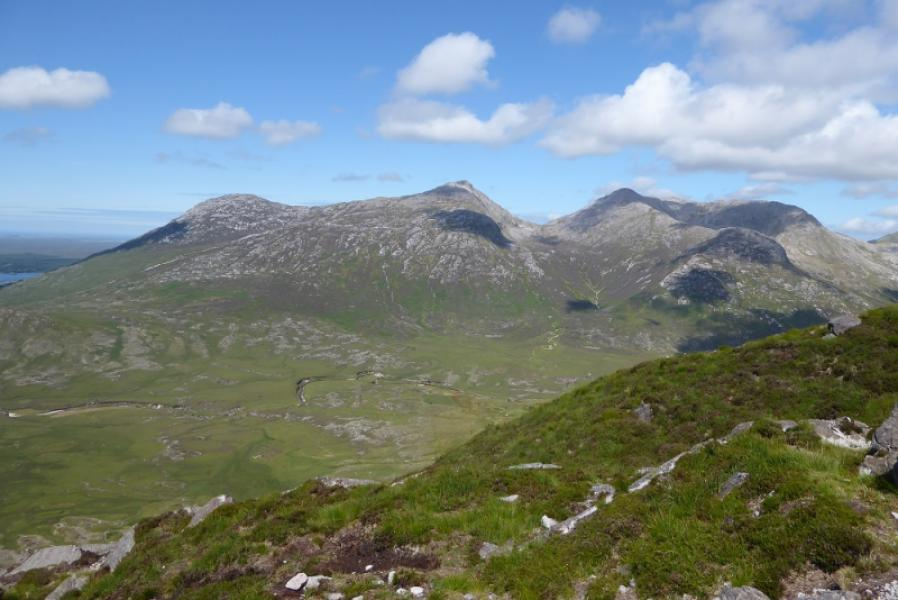
Benlettery (left), Bengower, and Benbreen (right), viewed from south ridge Derryclare

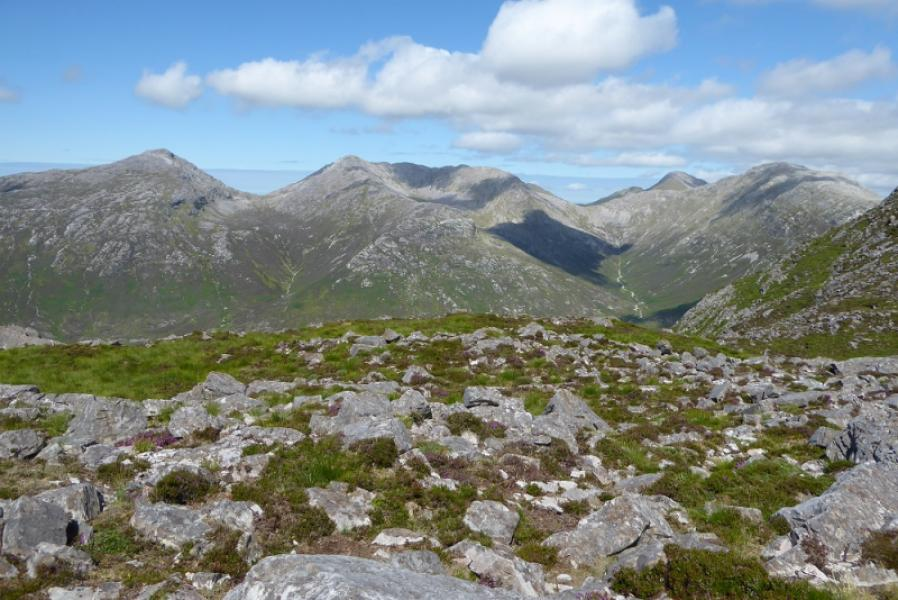
Bengower (left), Benbreen (centre), and Bencollaghduff (right), viewed Derryclare

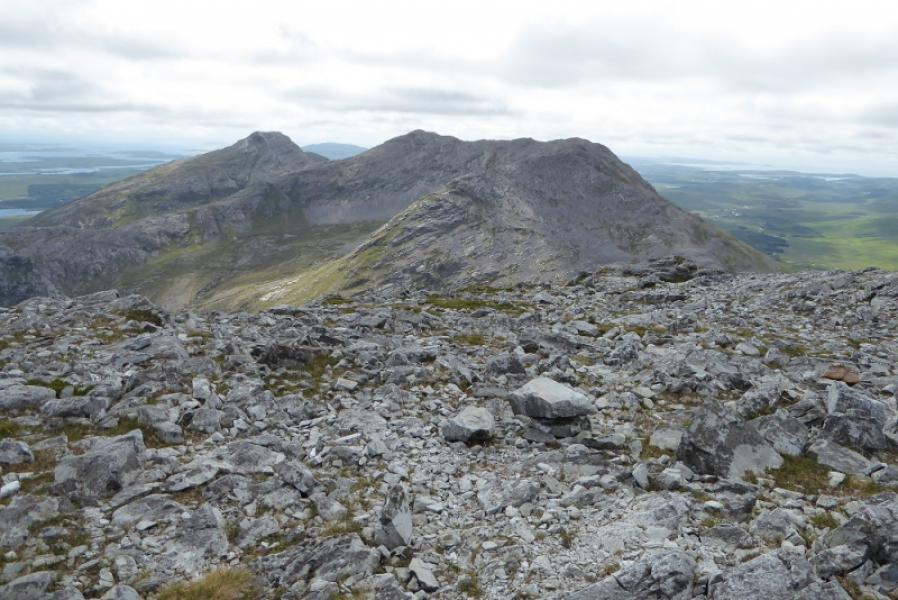
Bengower (back left) behind Benbreen, viewed from Bencollaghduff

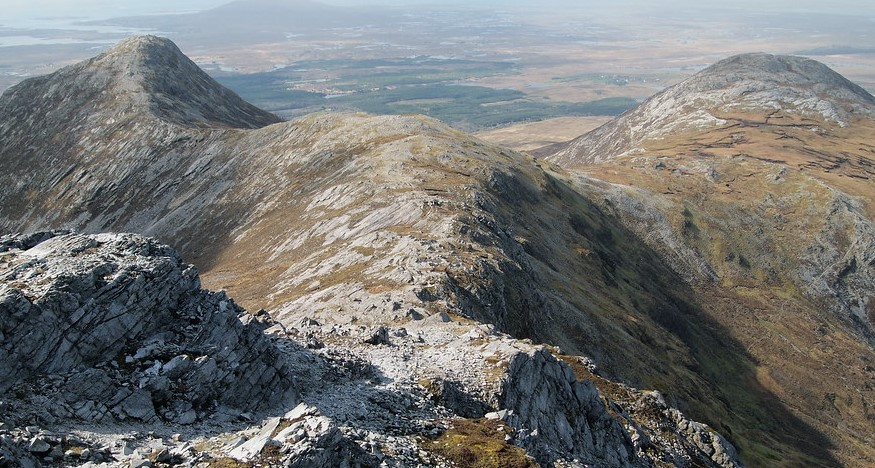
Benlettery (left) and Benglenisky (right) from the summit of Bengower

== Bibliography ==
- Fairbairn, Helen (2014). Ireland's Best Walks: A Walking Guide. Collins Press. ISBN 978-1848892118.
- MountainViews Online Database (Simon Stewart) (2013). A Guide to Ireland's Mountain Summits: The Vandeleur-Lynams & the Arderins. Collins Books. ISBN 978-1-84889-164-7.
- Paul Phelan (2011). Connemara & Mayo - A Walking Guide: Mountain, Coastal & Island Walks. Collins Press. ISBN 978-1848891029.
- Dillion, Paddy (2001). Connemara: Collins Rambler's guide. Harper Collins. ISBN 978-0002201216.
- Dillion, Paddy (1993). The Mountains of Ireland: A Guide to Walking the Summits. Cicerone. ISBN 978-1852841102.

== See also ==
- Twelve Bens
- Mweelrea, major range in Killary Harbour
- Maumturks, major range in Connemara
- Lists of mountains in Ireland
- Lists of mountains and hills in the British Isles
- List of Marilyns in the British Isles
- List of Hewitt mountains in England, Wales and Ireland
