= Benlettery =

Mountain in County Galway, Ireland

- Binn Leitrí
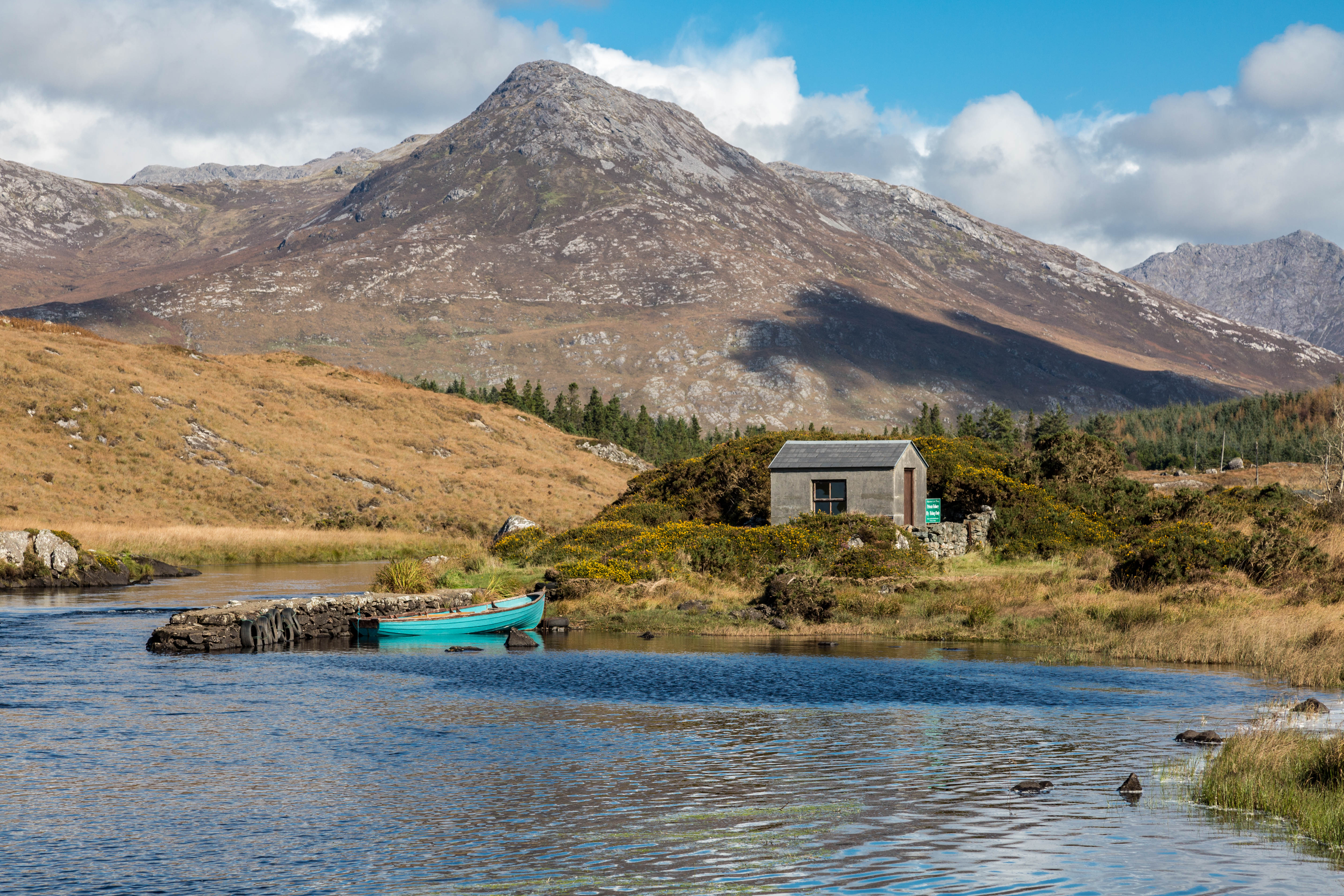
- Benlettery behind the Ballynahinch Castle fishery

Highest point
- Elevation: 577 m (1,893 ft)
- Prominence: 62 m (203 ft)
- Listing: Arderin
- Coordinates: 53°28′55″N 9°50′43″W

Naming
- English translation: Peak of the Wet Hillsides
- Language of name: Irish

Geography
- Location within Ireland
- Location: County Galway, Ireland
- Parent range: Twelve Bens
- OSI/OSNI grid: L7754649537
- Topo map: OSi Discovery 44

Geology
- Rock type(s): Pale quartzites, grits, graphitic bedrock

Benlettery (Irish: Binn Leitrí, meaning 'Peak of the Wet Hillsides') at 557 metres (1,827 ft), is the 259th–highest peak in Ireland on the Arderin scale. Benlettery is in the southernmost peak of the Twelve Bens mountain range in the Connemara National Park in County Galway, Ireland, and is the 11th-tallest of the core Twelve Bens. The Ben Lettery An Oige youth hostel is on the southern slopes of Benlettery, off the N59 road to Clifden.

== Naming ==
According to Irish academic Paul Tempan, the townland of Lettery (Irish: Leitrí, meaning "wet hillsides") is on the south slope of Benlettery. Tempan notes an alternative name of Bindowglass or "Bendouglas" (Irish: Binn Dúghlais, meaning "peak of the black stream") was recorded as early as 1684 by Irish historian Ruaidhrí Ó Flaithbheartaigh. Ó Flaithbheartaigh chronicled about a pool of water on the summit which turns the hair white of anyone who washes in it.

== Geography ==
Benlettery is the southernmost peak of the Twelve Bens and lies at its western edge. Benlettery is connected to the range by a high northerly ridge to the peak of Bengower 664 metres (2,178 ft); this ridge forms a fork which also connects neighboring Benglenisky 516 metres (1,693 ft) to Bengower. Benlettery is one of the six Bens that form a horseshoe around the valley of the Glencoaghan River (also known as the Glencoaghan Horseshoe).

Unlike most of the other main Bens, Benlettery is below 600-metres in elevation, however, its relative positioning at the southern end of the range, and its "pyramidal" summit (when viewed from the south), means that is often featured as a scenic backdrop to the Ballynahinch Castle and the Ballynahinch Lake.

== Ben Lettery Connemara Youth Hostel ==
On the southern slopes of Benlettery is the 40-bed "Ben Lettery Connemara Youth Hostel" (Benlettery spelt as two words), owned and operated by An Oige, the Irish YHA; it was ranked by Outside.ie as one of the ten best An Oige youth hostels in Ireland.

== Hill walking ==
As with Derryclare 677 metres (2,221 ft), on the east side of the Glencoaghan Horseshoe, Benlettery's accessibility makes is a popular peak as a standalone 5-kilometre 2-3 hour climb (starting and ending at the Ben Lettery An Oige youth hostel); however, the high ridge Benlettery shares with the peaks of Bengower and Benglenisky, means that it is also climbed as part a 7-kilometre 3-4 hour horseshoe loop-walk with these peaks.

Benlettery is part of the 16–kilometre 8–9 hour Glencoaghan Horseshoe, considered one of Ireland's best hill-walks; and of the even longer Owenglin Horseshoe, a 20–kilometre 10–12 hour route around the Owenglin River taking in over twelve summits.

== Gallery ==
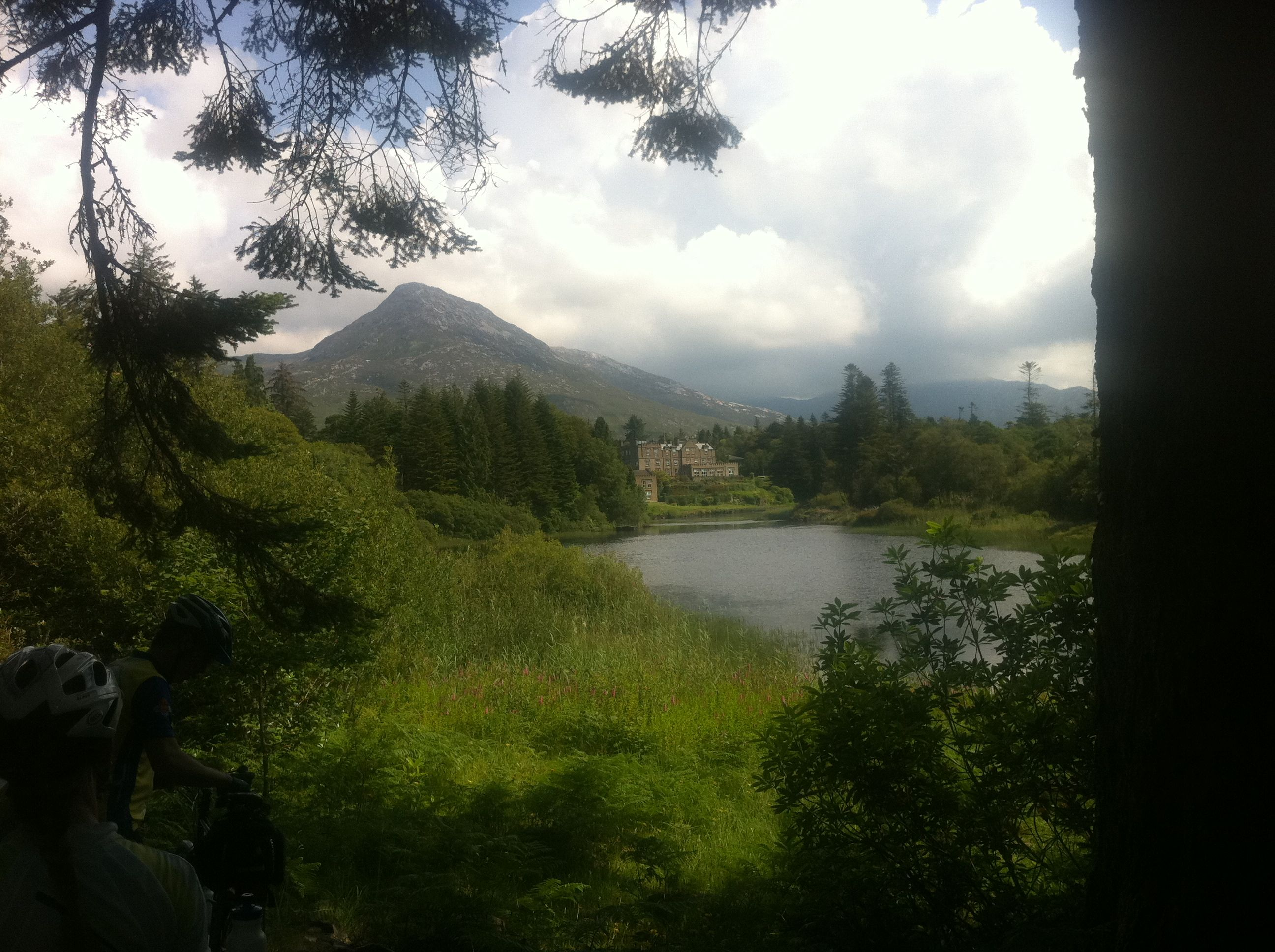
Benlettery behind Ballynahinch Castle

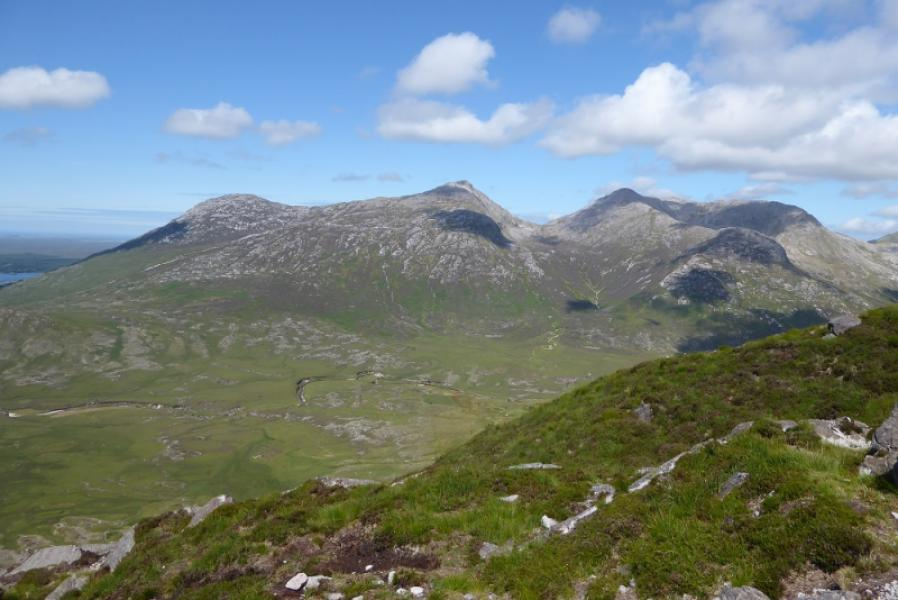
Benlettery (left), Bengower (middle), Benbreen (right), from Derryclare

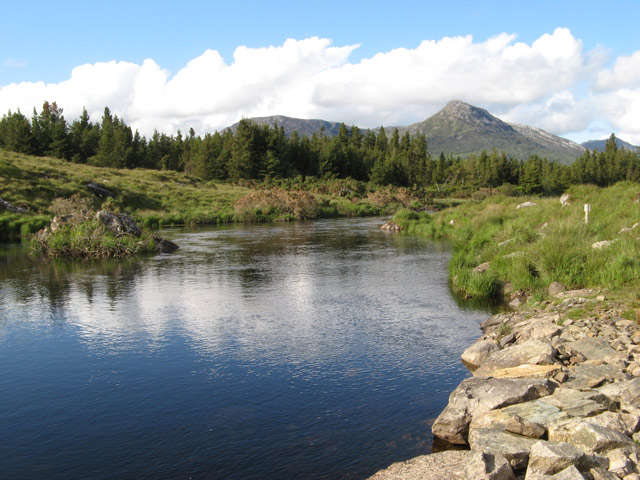
Benlettery (right) and Benglenisky (left), from the Owenmore River

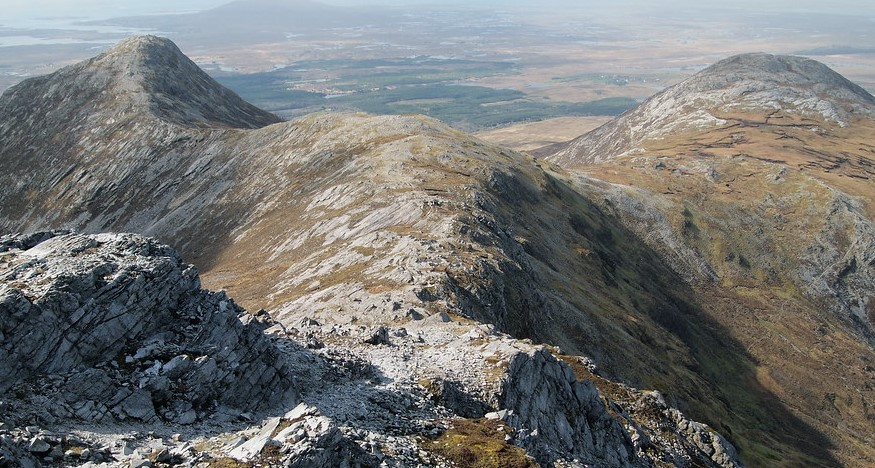
Benlettery (left) and Benglenisky (right) from summit of Bengower

== Bibliography ==
- Fairbairn, Helen (2014). Ireland's Best Walks: A Walking Guide. Collins Press. ISBN 978-1848892118.
- MountainViews Online Database (Simon Stewart) (2013). A Guide to Ireland's Mountain Summits: The Vandeleur-Lynams & the Arderins. Collins Books. ISBN 978-1-84889-164-7.
- Paul Phelan (2011). Connemara & Mayo - A Walking Guide: Mountain, Coastal & Island Walks. Collins Press. ISBN 978-1848891029.
- Dillion, Paddy (2001). Connemara: Collins Rambler's guide. Harper Collins. ISBN 978-0002201216.
- Dillion, Paddy (1993). The Mountains of Ireland: A Guide to Walking the Summits. Cicerone. ISBN 978-1852841102.

== See also ==
- Twelve Bens
- Mweelrea, major range in Killary Harbour
- Maumturks, major range in Connemara
- Lists of mountains in Ireland
- Lists of mountains and hills in the British Isles
