= Ballynahinch Castle =

Irish country house hotel in Connemara, Ireland

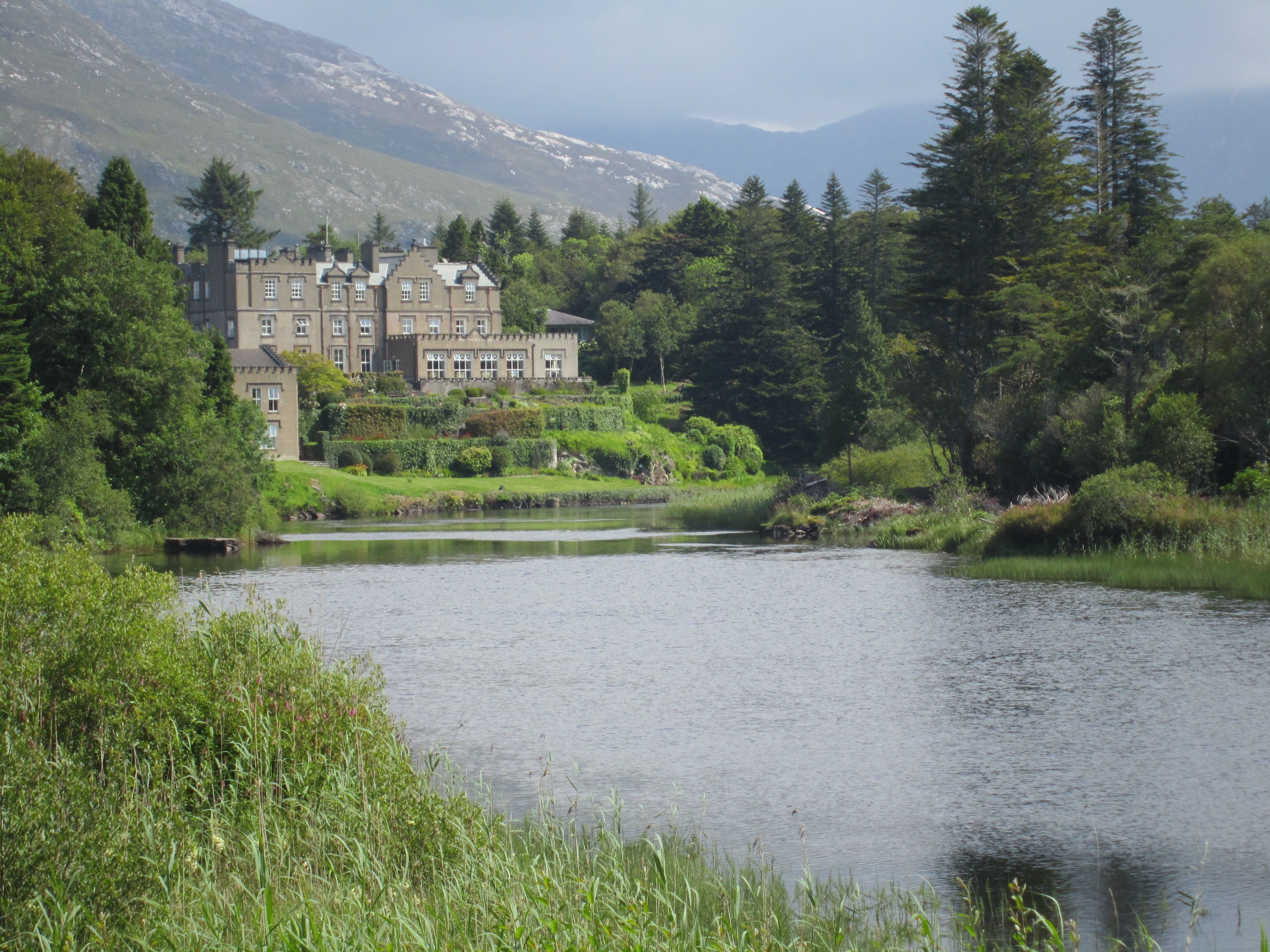

- Location within Ireland

General information
- Type: Hotel
- Location: Connemara, Ireland
- Coordinates: 53.460200°N 9.862700°W
- Owner: Denis O'Brien and Catherine Walsh

Technical details
- Floor count: 3
- Grounds: 450 acres

Other information
- Number of rooms: 48 bedrooms

Website
- www.ballynahinch-castle.com

Ballynahinch Castle is a former Irish country house and estate, built on the site of a former castle, which is now a luxury hotel set in a private estate in the Connemara region of County Galway, Ireland. The castle lies on the edge of Ballynahinch Lake and Ballynahinch River, and is directly overlooked by Benlettery 557 metres (1,827 ft), one of the Twelve Bens mountain range.

This detached three-storey country house was built 1754 and while the structure has been modified throughout its life, the castle still retains its architectural integrity. One of the former residents of Ballynahinch Castle was Richard Martin (Humanity Dick, 1754–1834), founder of the Society for the Prevention of Cruelty to Animals and Member of Parliament for County Galway. Another owner was the Maharaja Jam Sahib of Nawanager ('Ranji'). Ranji decided to purchase the house, estate and its salmon and sea-trout fisheries from the Berridge Family in 1924.

== Description ==
Ballynahinch Castle is located in the Connemara region of County Galway, Ireland, It lies close to the N59 road between Galway and Clifden, and on the southern shore of Lake Ballynahinch. set in an area of ancient woodland surrounded by mountains, lakes and bogland. The castle sits at the foot of the Twelve Bens mountain range.

The current building dates to 1754 and has been altered several times since then. It is a three-storey country house, set in a former demesne estate featuring a river, small lakes, and woodland. The castle currently operates as a luxury hotel with a focus on outdoor activities such as guided walks, shooting and fishing.

== History ==
The land on which the castle is situated was owned as early as the 14th century by the Ó Flaithbheartaigh (O'Flaherty) family, who controlled a large tract of land known as Iar Connacht which stretched across much of the County Galway and into County Mayo. The first known castle on the site was a small structure next to the lake, built by Dónal Ó Flaithbheartaigh in around 1546, one of several he built around Connemara. This was around the time of his marriage to Grace O'Malley, which united the O'Flahertys with O'Malley's powerful family and extended his land-holdings. O'Malley became the de facto head of the family at that time, as Dónal was not an effective ruler.

In the mid 17th century, the castle was acquired by the Martins, an Anglo-Norman family and one of the fourteen tribes of Galway. The Martin family commissioned the building of the present castle building in 1756, originally for use as an inn. Richard Martin, known as "Humanity Dick" because of his commitment to animal welfare, converted the house to a private residence at some point, and lived for a considerable part of his life at the castle. Irish political leader Daniel O'Connell stayed at the castle as a guest of the Martin family in 1843, while he was attending a meeting nearby.

The castle was bought in 1872 by Richard Berridge, a brewer from London. Berridge owned large tracts of land across western Ireland as well as in the English counties of Middlesex and Kent. Berridge used the land in Ireland for leisure, and built several fishing lodges.

=== 20th century ===
In 1924 the castle was sold again, this time to Ranjitsinhji, the ruler of the Indian princely state of Nawanagar. Ranjitsinhji was also a talented cricketer who played Test matches for the England national team. Initially he rented the castle, tempted by the fishing opportunities there, and he reportedly fell in love with it. Ranjitsinhji provided considerable support to the Connemara region, investing in cottage industry and helping local business as well as employing more than fifty people on projects to improve the castle and estate. Ranjitsinhji continued to reside in India but spent time in the castle every year until his death in 1933.

After Ranjitsinhji's death, his nephew sold the castle to the Dublin-based McCormack family, and in 1946 it passed into the control of the Irish Tourist Board who converted it into a hotel.

It was sold back into private ownership in 1952, and has been owned by various families since then.

From the 1970s until 2014, the castle was owned by Raymond K. Mason, former head of the Charter Company. In July 1982, four top executives from the Charter Company who were guests of Mason, died in a helicopter crash while travelling from the hotel to Shannon Airport.

As of 2014 the castle and estate property is owned by Denis O'Brien and his wife Catherine O'Brien who refurbished it and run it as a 48 bedroom hotel on a 450 acre estate.

== See also ==
- Twelve Bens, neighbouring mountain range
- Benlettery, neighbouring mountain
- List of historic houses in the Republic of Ireland
