= Ballynahinch Lake =

Lake in Galway, Ireland

- Loch Bhaile na hInse (Irish)
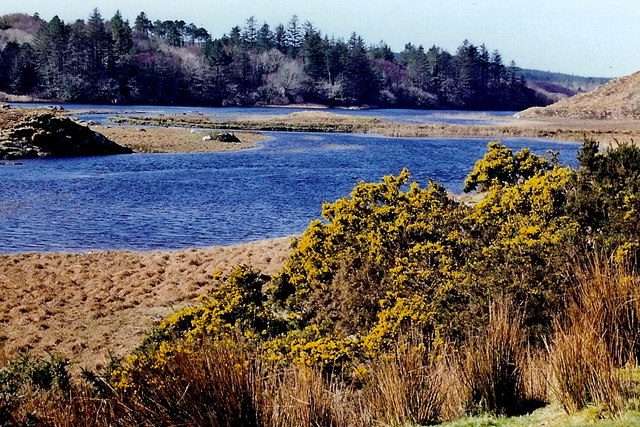

- Location in Ireland
- Location: County Galway
- Coordinates: 53°28′2″N 9°51′30″W
- Primary inflows: Derryclare Lough
- Primary outflows: Owenmore River
- Catchment area: 155.23 km^{2} (59.9 sq mi)
- Basin countries: Ireland
- Max. length: 3.9 km (2.4 mi)
- Max. width: 0.9 km (0.6 mi)
- Surface area: 1.7 km^{2} (0.66 sq mi)
- Surface elevation: 7 m (23 ft)

Ballynahinch Lake (Irish: Loch Bhaile na hInse) is a freshwater lake in the west of Ireland. It is located in the Connemara area of County Galway.

== Geography ==
Ballynahinch Lake measures about 4 km (2.5 mi) long and 1 km (0.6 mi) wide. It is located about 10 km (6 mi) east of Clifden and about 60 km (37 mi) northwest of Galway city. The Twelve Bens mountain range lies to the north of the lake, with Benlettery directly overlooking. Ballynahinch Castle lies on the west shores.

== Hydrology ==
Ballynahinch Lake is fed by Derryclare Lough at its eastern end (which is in turn fed by the neighboring Lough Inagh), and it drains to the south via the small Owenmore River – also called the Ballynahinch River, and not to be confused with the Owenmore River (County Mayo) – which in turn enters Bertraghboy Bay.

== Natural history ==
Fish species in Ballynahinch Lake include salmon and brown trout. Ballynahinch Lake is part of The Twelve Bens/Garraun Complex Special Area of Conservation.

== See also ==
- List of loughs in Ireland
- Ballynahinch Castle
- Benlettery
