= List of mountains and hills of County Mayo =

County Mayo (shaded dark green)

This is a list of mountains and hills in County Mayo, Ireland.

- Achill Sound Hill
- Barrclashcame
- Beg Range
- Ben Creggan
- Ben Gorm
- Birreencorragh
- Bohaun
- Bullaunmore
- Carrafull
- Carrawteige
- Claggan Mountain
- Clare Island Hills
- Clew Bay drumlins
- Cloghmoyle
- Corraun Hill
- Corslieve
- Croagh Patrick
- Croaghaun
- Croaghmoyle
- Devilsmother
- Finny
- Fox Hill
- Glenamong
- Glencastle Hill
- Glinsk Mountain
- Inishturk Island Hill
- Killogeary
- Knappagh
- Knockadaf
- Knockaffertagh
- Knocklettercuss
- Knockmore
- Knocknalower
- Knocknascollop
- Maumakeogh Mountain
- Maumykelly
- Maumtrasna
- Mweelin
- Mweelrea
- Nephin
- Nephin Beg
- Ox Mountains (west section)
- Partry Mountains
- Pollatomish
- Porturlin
- Rathlackan
- Sheeffry Hills
- Slieve Carr
- Slieve Fyagh
- Slieve Gamph
- Slievemore
- Sraheens
- Stonefield
- Tawnaghmore
- Termon Hill
- Tower Hill
- Tristia

== See also ==
- List of mountains in Ireland
