= Leenaun =

Leenaun An Líonán
- Village
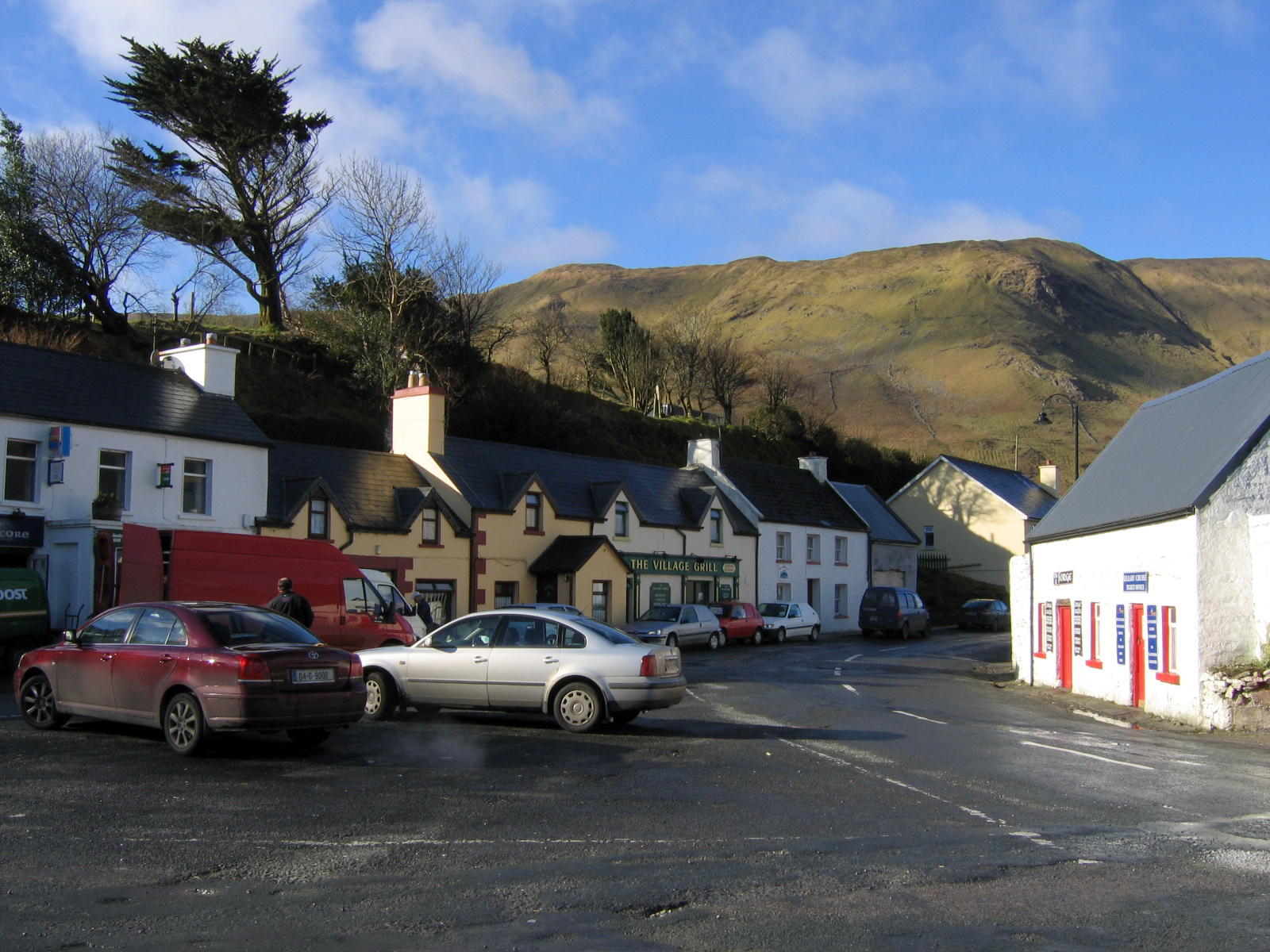

- Location in Ireland
- Coordinates: 53°35′45″N 9°41′39″W
- Country: Ireland
- Province: Connacht
- County: County Galway
- Elevation: 127 m (417 ft)
- Time zone: UTC+0 (WET)
  - Summer (DST): UTC-1 (IST (WEST))
- Irish Grid Reference: L874618

Leenaun (Irish: An Líonán or Líonán Cinn Mhara, meaning '(submerged) reef at the head of the sea'), also Leenane, is a village and a 747 hectares (1,846 acres) townland in County Galway, Ireland, on the southern shore of Killary Harbour and the northern boundary of Conamara.

== Location and geography ==
Leenaun is situated on the junction of the N59 road, and the R336 road in Connemara.

Leenaun lies where the deep u-shaped Maam Valley, bounded by the Devilsmother to the east, and the massif of Leenaun Hill to the west, meets Killary Harbour, Ireland's deepest fjord. Across the fjord from the village, is the massif of Ben Gorm, with the larger massif of Mweelrea behind it; while to the east, lie the scenic Aasleagh Falls. The village is on the route of the Western Way long-distance trail and the Wild Atlantic Way.

Within Maam Valley are some ancient woods, the Erriff Woods are nearby. Across the fjord is the hamlet of Bundorragha and Delphi (the valley of the Bundorragha River is sometimes called the Delphi Valley) in County Mayo. The River Erriff which runs into the fjord, along with a river and three lakes at Delphi, are active fisheries.

Kylemore Abbey lies to the south and the scenic Renvyle-peninsula lies to the south-west.

=== Bridge loss and replacement ===
On 18 July 2007, following heavy rain, the only river bridge in the village was swept away, cutting the village in half, and altering some local routes by over 100-kilometres.; the bridge had stood for over 182 years. A permanent replacement bridge was constructed in 2009, with increased traffic capacity.

== Local amenities ==
In the village are two pubs, a hotel with a pub and restaurant, and guesthouses, one of which is a former convent of the Sisters of Mercy. There is also a café-restaurant and a sheep and wool museum, a post office and food shop, a gift shop, as well as a community centre and library, and a community park. There are two churches in the village, St. Michael's Catholic Church and St. John the Baptist, Church of Ireland.

== In the media ==
Leenaun was the setting for the 1990 film The Field, and of British-Irish playwright and filmmaker Martin McDonagh's plays The Beauty Queen of Leenane and The Lonesome West.

Archaeologist Michael Gibbons's discovery of an ancient ring barrow was featured on RTÉ and local media in 2025.

== Gallery ==
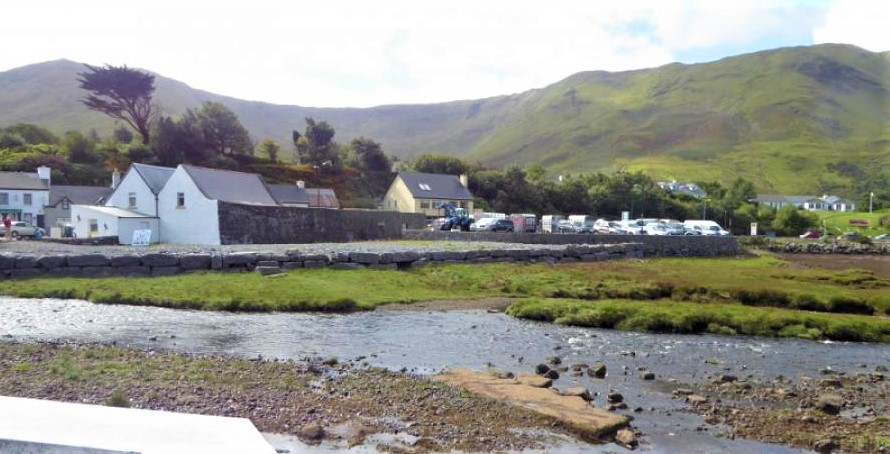
Leenaun Hill (left), and Leenaun Hill Far North-West Top (right) from Leenane village

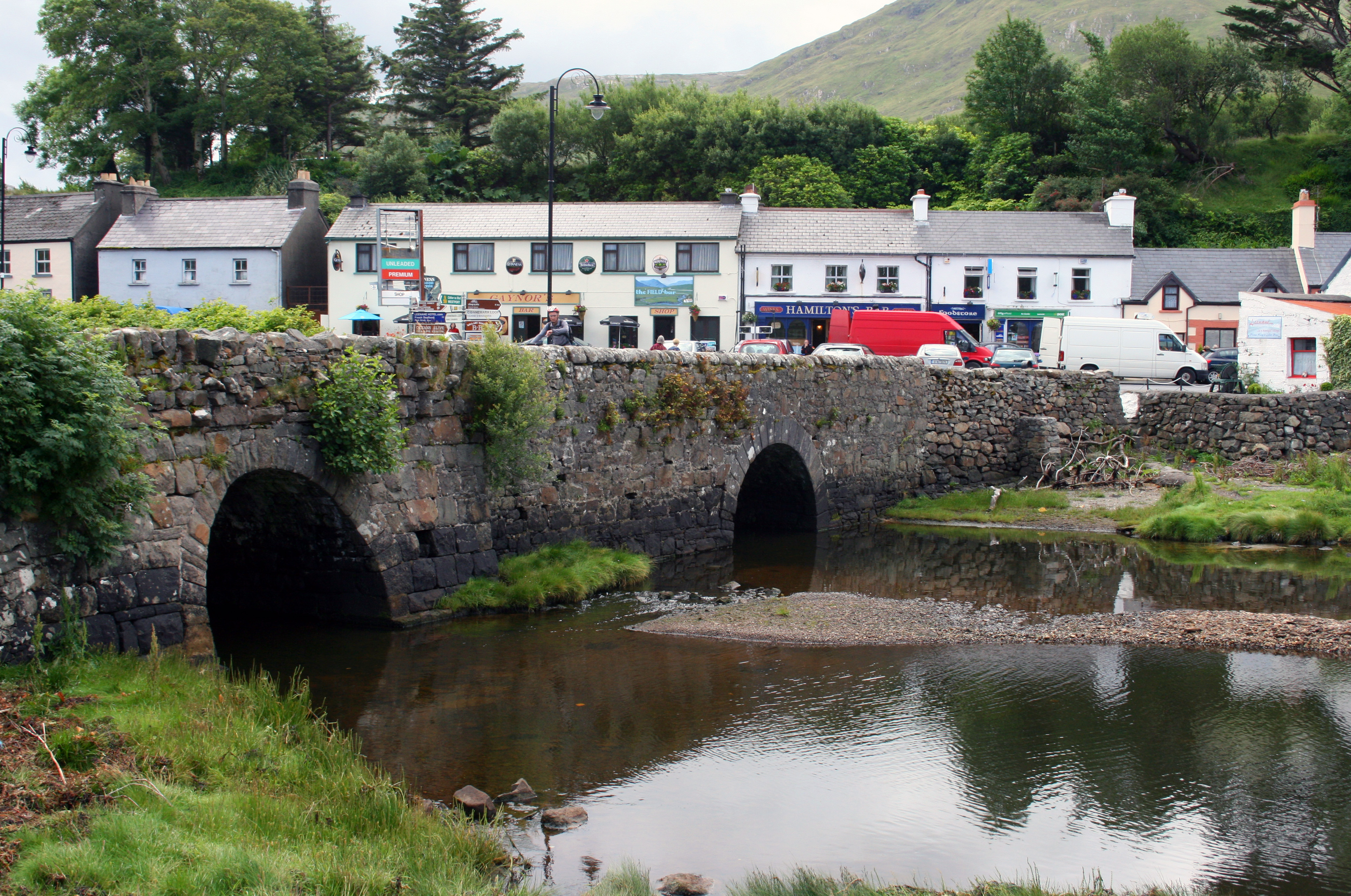
Centre of village, and the old bridge

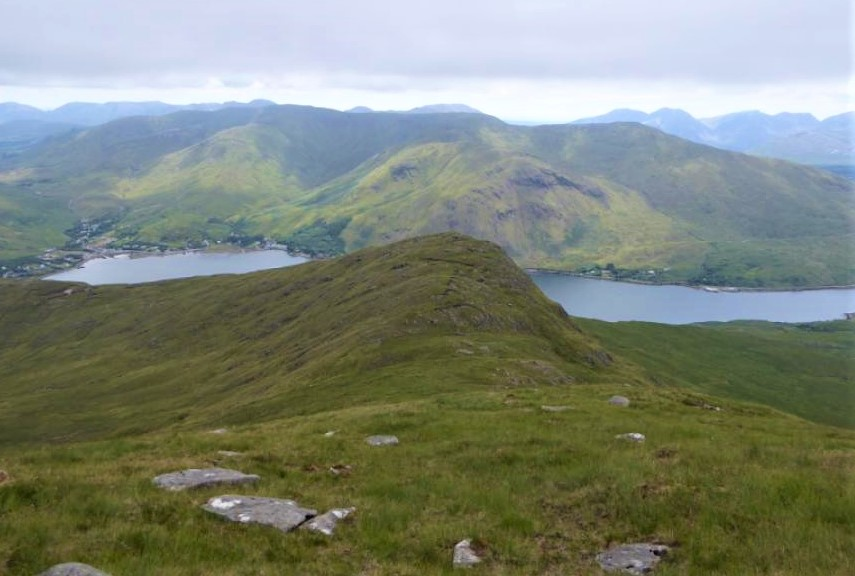
Massif of Leenaun Hill (centre), and Leenaun (left), across Killary Harbour on Ben Gorm

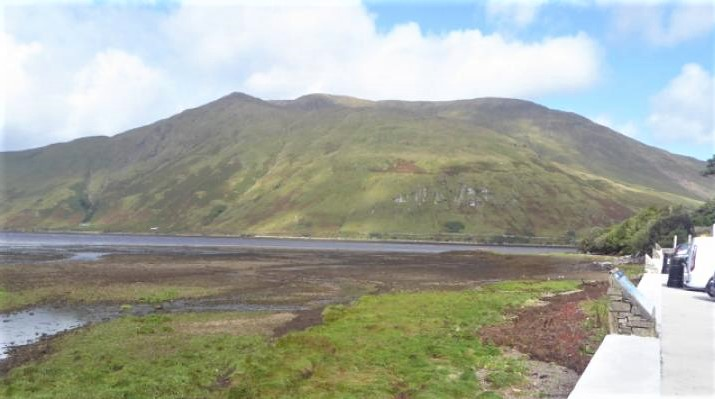
Ben Gorm from across the Killary Harbour in Leenaun.

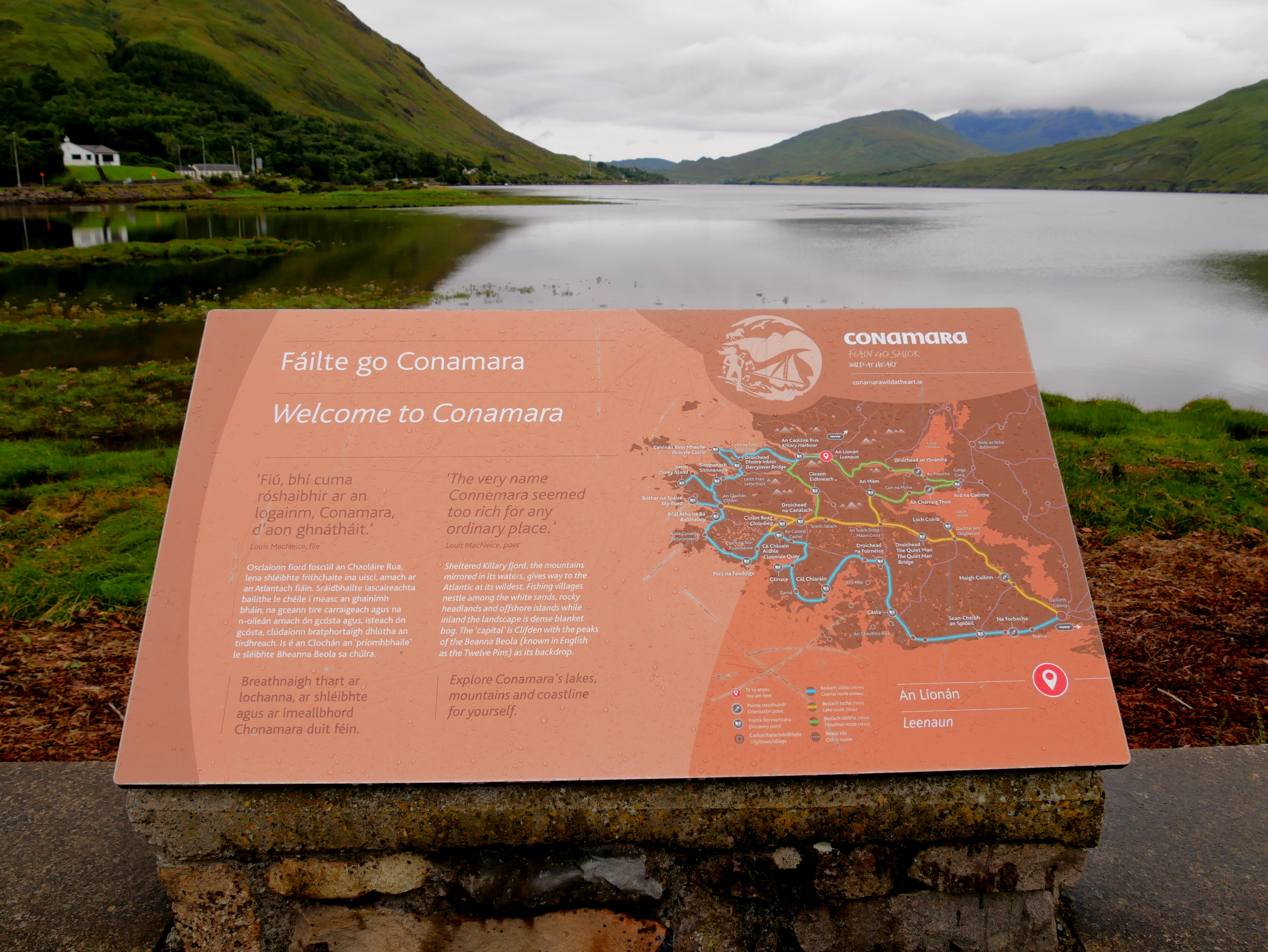
Killary Harbour at Leenaun

== See also ==
- Connemara
- List of towns and villages in Ireland
- Mac ind Óclaich
