= Ben Lugmore =

Mountain in County Mayo, Ireland

- Binn Log Mhór
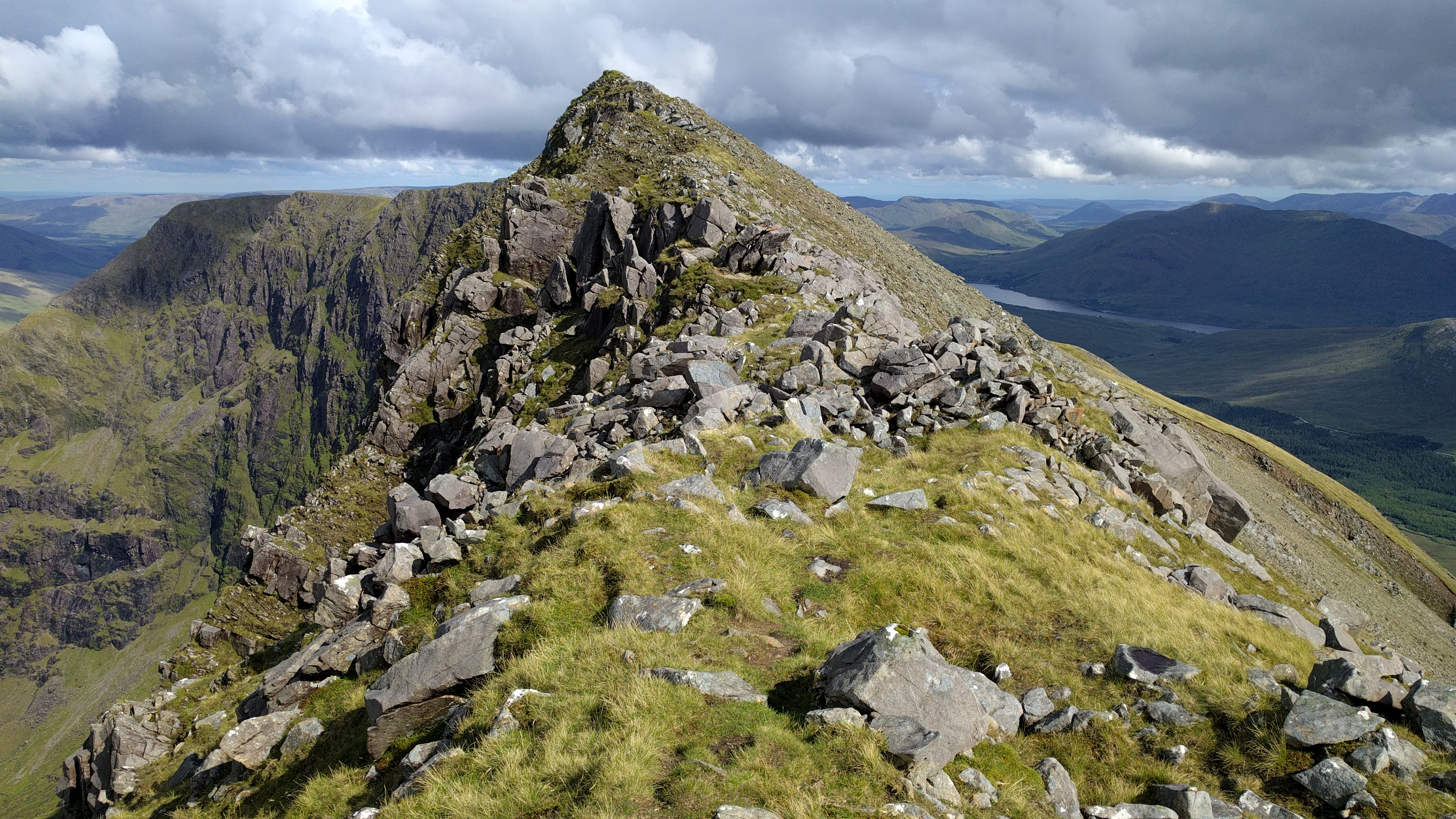
- Looking east to summit of Ben Lugmore, with the cliffs of Lug More (Irish: Coum Dubh) corrie (left)

Highest point
- Elevation: 803 m (2,635 ft)
- Prominence: 158 m (518 ft)
- Listing: 100 Highest Irish Mountains, Marilyn, Hewitt, Arderin, Simm, Vandeleur-Lynam
- Coordinates: 53°38′34″N 9°47′51″W

Naming
- English translation: peak of the big hollow
- Language of name: Irish

Geography
- Location within Ireland
- Location: County Mayo, Ireland
- Parent range: Mweelrea
- OSI/OSNI grid: L8117367379
- Topo map: OSi Discovery 37

Geology
- Rock type(s): Sandstone & conglomerate, ignimbrite bedrock.

Climbing
- Normal route: via The Ramp in the Irish: Coum Dubh

Ben Lugmore (Irish: Binn Log Mhór, meaning 'peak of the big hollow') at 803 metres (2,635 ft) is the 29th-highest peak in Ireland on the Arderin scale, and the 37th-highest peak on the Vandeleur-Lynam scale. It is in a horseshoe-shaped massif that includes the slightly higher peak of Mweelrea at 814 metres (2,671 ft), the highest mountain in the Irish province of Connacht. The massif is between Killary Harbour and Doo Lough, in County Mayo.

The peak is noted for its long summit ridge that forms a deep cliff-lined headwall around the corrie of Lug More (Irish: Coum Dubh); the corrie includes a feature known as The Ramp that climbers use to access the summit ridge, as well as rock climbs and winter ice climbs. While the peak can be accessed via a 3-hour walk from the corrie below, it is also summited by way of the 6-7 hour Mweelrea Horseshoe, described as a "top three" mountain walk in Ireland.

== Naming ==
Irish academic Paul Tempan lists Ben Lugmore as an anglicisation of the Irish: Binn Log Mhór that translates as "peak of the big hollow", and which describes the deep corrie on Lugmore's northeast face called Lug More (split into two words). Patrick Weston Joyce chronicled that the term Lugmore, which he translated as "Great Hollow", appears in several other Irish placenames; and there are several entries in the Placenames Database of Ireland.

== Geology ==
Ben Lugmore's geology is what is known as the Mweelrea Formation, and is very different from that of the Twelve Bens, on the other side of Killary Harbour. At a summary level, the Mweelrea Formation consists of Ordovician period sandstones originally deposited on large alluvial fans, and distally-equivalent alluvial plains and delta fans. Interbedded with these sandstones are tufts, being ash deposits from Ordovician period volcanos.

== Geography ==
The peak of Ben Lugmore lies on the northern arm of the horseshoe that forms the massif of the Mweelrea Mountains, which is bounded by Killary Harbour, Ireland's deepest fjord, to the south, and Doo Lough to the north; Mweelrea, the provincial top for Connacht, lies near the apex of this horseshoe.

Ben Lugmore is described as having a small sharp "airy" summit which lies on a high narrow southeast to northwest ridge that links with Ben Bury, and then on to Mweelrea. This ridge includes two high subsidiary summits either side of Ben Lugmore, both of which are of equal height: Ben Lugmore West Top at 790 metres (2,590 ft), whose prominence of 47 metres (154 ft) qualifies it as a Vandeleur-Lynam and a Hewitt, and Ben Lugmore East Top at 790 metres (2,590 ft), whose prominence of 37 metres (121 ft) also qualifies it as a Vandeleur-Lynam and a Hewitt. From a distance, Ben Lugmore's profile is that of a long and high sharp ridge, along which its various summits (main and subsidiary) are dotted.

Northeast of Ben Lugmore's ridge are the cliffs of the deep corrie of Lug More (also called Irish: Coum Dubh), which itself looks into the small valley of Glencullin at the junction of Doo Lough and Glencullin Lough. To the southwest of the ridge is the valley of Glenconnelly; and where the high southwestern cliffs of Ben Lugmore West Top, Benbury and Mweelrea circle the northern corrie lake at the head of the Glenconnelly valley, known as Lough Bellawaum.

Ben Lugmore's own prominence of 158 metres (518 ft) qualifies it as a Marilyn, and it also ranks it as the 18th-highest mountain in Ireland on the MountainViews Online Database 100 Highest Irish Mountains, where the minimum prominence threshold is 100 metres. The peak is listed as the 29th-highest peak in Ireland on the Arderin scale, and the 37th-highest peak on the Vandeleur-Lynam scale.

== Recreation ==
=== Hill walking ===
The most direct route to the summit of Ben Lugmore is the 6 kilometres (3.7 mi) 3-hour round trip via the Lug More (or Irish: Coum Dubh) corrie and the valley of Glen Glencullin. A notable feature known as The Ramp is used, which crosses the headwall of this corrie at mid-way, from east to west in an upward slope; reaching the ridge of Ben Lugmore at a col with Ben Bury. While this route is direct, caution is advised in properly finding The Ramp, as the corrie has extensive cliffs. This route can also be extended into a 13 kilometres (8.1 mi) 6-hour round-trip that takes in the additional summits of Ben Bury and Mweelrea as well.

Ben Lugmore is also climbed as part of the 15 kilometres (9.3 mi) 6-7 hour Mweelrea Horseshoe (being the 2nd-highest peak on the route), which is described in Ireland's Best Walks (2014), as being one of the "top three" mountain walks in Ireland. The circuit starts and ends at the Delphi Mountain Resort, and takes in all the peaks of the massif of Mweelrea, including Ben Lugmore (and its subsidiary peaks), Ben Bury, Mweelrea and the Mweelrea SE Spur (marked as point 495-metres in the OS map).

=== Rock climbing ===
Ben Lugmore's high northeastern cliffs that form the upper headwall of the Lug More (or Irish: Coum Dubh) corrie (situated above The Ramp), are a noted rock-climbing venue with multi-pitch mountain rock-climbs with grades varying from Diff (D) to Moderate Severe (MS), and length ranging from 35–70 metres (115–230 ft). Some of the first ascents date from the mid 1950s, and they often follow chimneys and gullies between Ben Lugmore's various subsidiary peaks.

More serious modern rock climbing routes are located at the edge of the southern entrance to the corrie (marked as Askaneeraun on the OS Maps), at the Doo Lough Crags (marked Teevaree Rocks on the OS Maps). The routes vary from 30 to 70 metres on sandstone and conglomerate rock, with rock climbing grades in the range of VS (Very Severe) to E2 (Extreme, level 2), and well regarded climbs of Bragela's Watch (100 metres (330 ft), E1), Red Dawn (25 metres (82 ft), E2 5c), and Letter to Breshnev (30 metres (98 ft), E3/4 6a); most of the best routes were developed in the late 1980s to early 1990s.

=== Winter climbing ===
The Lug More (or Irish: Coum Dubh) corrie also has a number of winter climbs, the most notable of which is Recession Gully (Grade II/III, 400 metres (1,300 ft)).

== Gallery ==
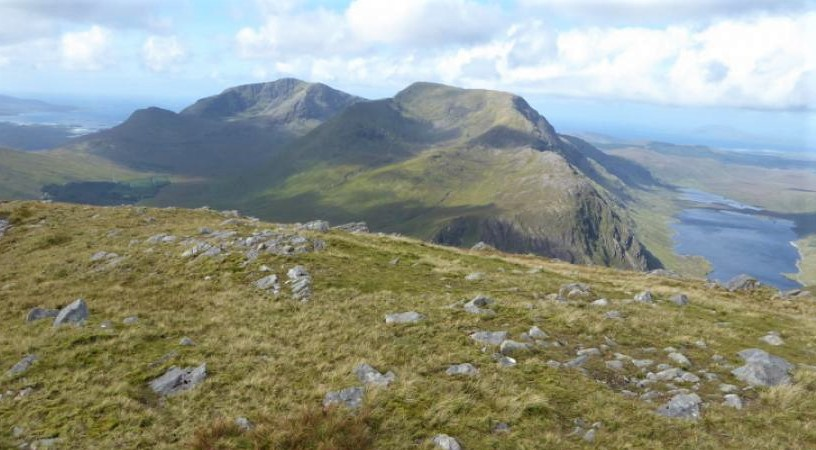
Mweelrea (back left), and Ben Lugmore (centre), viewed from the east on the summit of Ben Gorm

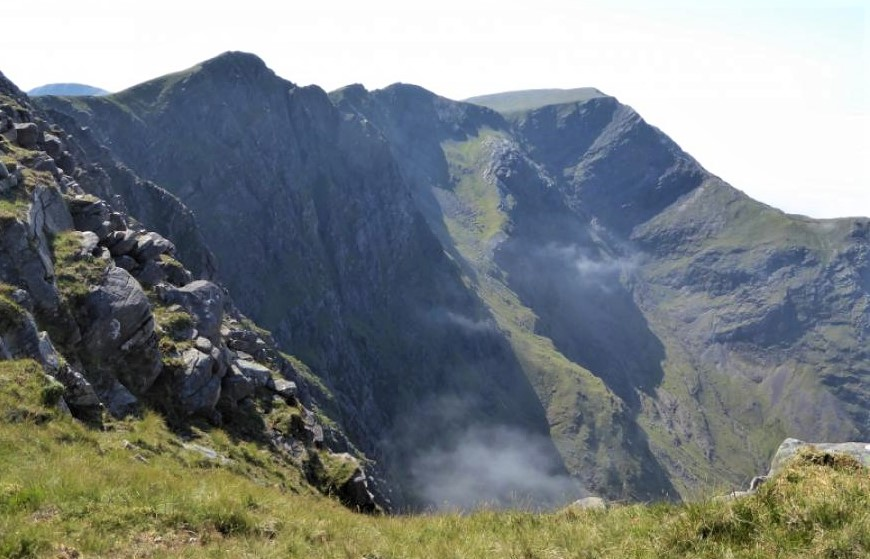
Northeast face of Ben Lugmore, and Lug More corrie, with The Ramp (green, in sunlight) crossing it, viewed from east spur of Ben Lugmore

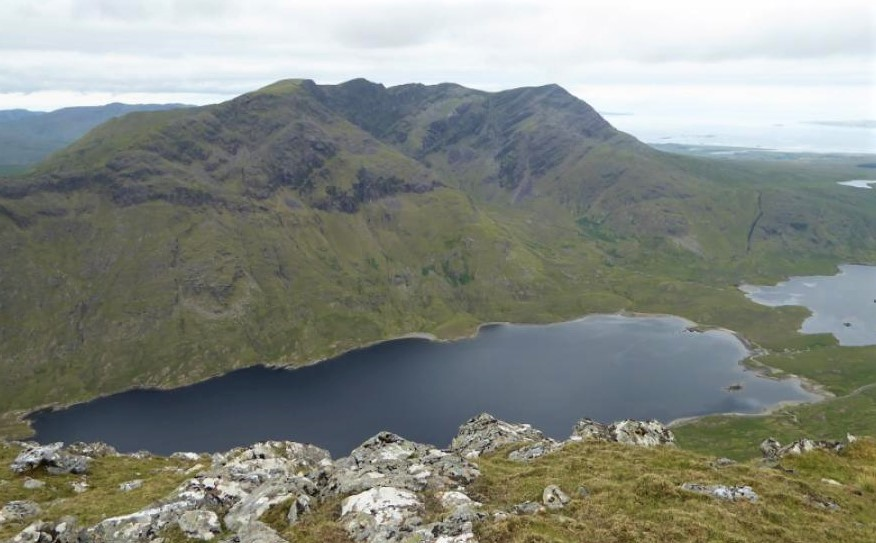
Full ridge of Ben Lugmore and Lug More corrie, viewed from across Doo Lough, on Barrclashcame

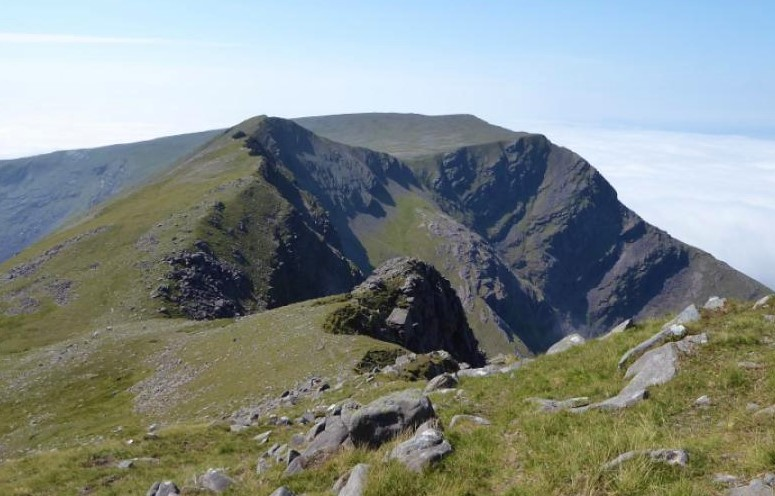
Ben Lugmore West Top, and Ben Bury (back right), viewed from Ben Lugmore

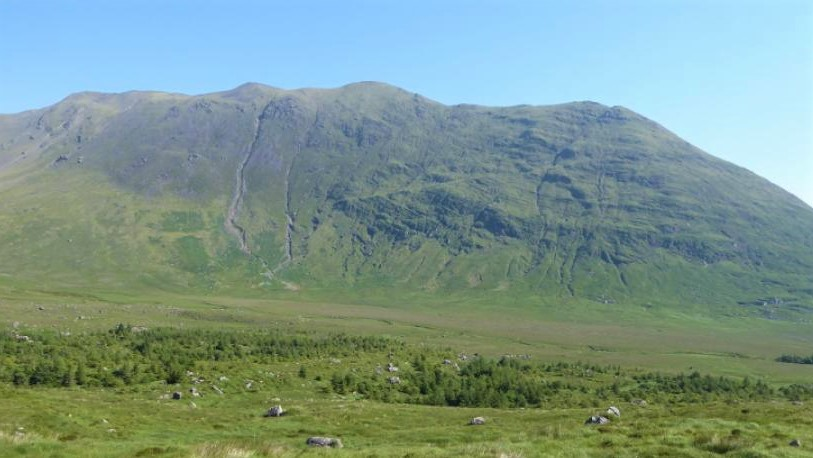
Ben Lugmore southwest face, viewed from the Glenconnelly valley

== See also ==
- List of Hewitt mountains in England, Wales and Ireland
- Lists of mountains and hills in the British Isles
- Lists of mountains in Ireland
- Maumturks, a major range in Connemara
