= Leenaun Hill =

Mountain in County Galway, Ireland

- Irish: An Meall Dubh
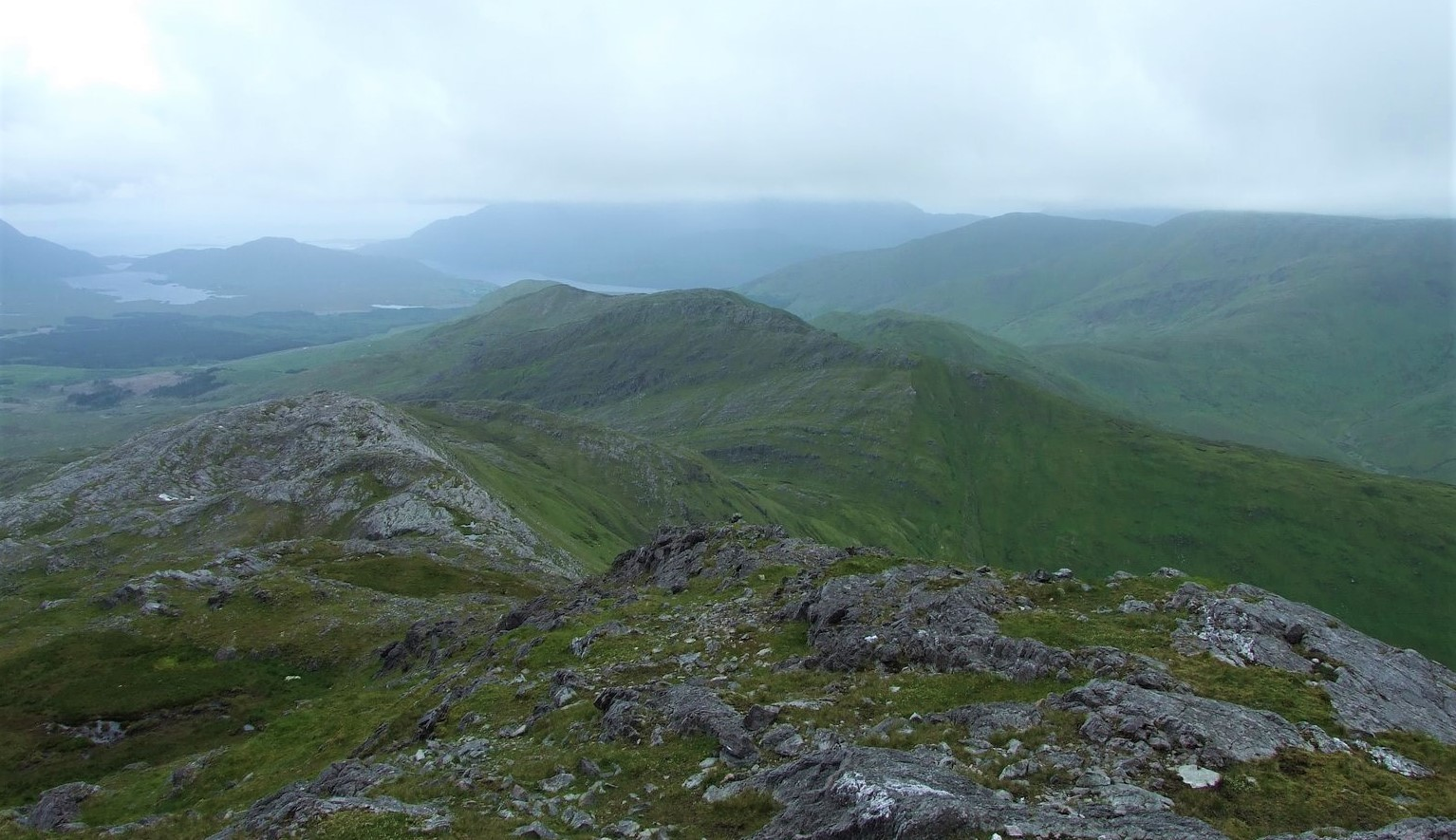
- View north to Leenaun Hill from Letterbreckaun

Highest point
- Elevation: 618 m (2,028 ft)
- Prominence: 363 m (1,191 ft)
- Listing: Marilyn, Hewitt, Arderin, Simm, Vandeleur-Lynam
- Coordinates: 53°34′19″N 9°42′00″W

Naming
- English translation: Black knoll
- Language of name: Irish

Geography
- Location within island of Ireland
- Location: Leenaun, County Galway, Ireland
- Parent range: Maumturks
- OSI/OSNI grid: L8743259343
- Topo map: OSi Discovery 37

Geology
- Rock type(s): Siltstone & sandstone Bedrock

Climbing
- Easiest route: Via Leenaun village

Leenaun Hill (Irish: An Meall Dubh, meaning 'black knoll') at 618 metres (2,028 ft), is the 201st–highest peak in Ireland on the Arderin scale, and the 243rd–highest peak on the Vandeleur-Lynam scale. Leenaun Hill lies on a massif that overlooks Leenaun village and Killary Harbour, and which is at the far northeastern sector of the Maumturks mountain range in the Connemara National Park in County Galway, Ireland; this massif is connected to the main range via the "Col of Despondency". Leenaun Hill is the 6th-highest mountain in the Maumturks, and its grassy massif, constructed from sandstone and siltstone, contrasts with the rocky ridges and summits constructed from quartzites, grits, and graphitic, of the middle and southern sectors of the range.

== Naming ==
Irish academic Paul Tempan records that Leenaun hill has also been called "Bunnaviskaun". The peak has been called Leenaun Mountain.

Tempan notes the subsidiary peak of Irish: Búcán, it takes the term "búc" from the dialect word "buc", which means "point" or "summit", and is found in Southern France in mountain names (e.g. Buc Pointu).

== Geography ==
Leenaun Hill lies on its own massif in the northeastern sector of the Maumturk range, separated from the central spine of the range by a deep col at 250 metres (820 ft), which is known to hill-walkers of the Maumturks Challenge as the "Col of Despondency". The geology of this massif is derived from siltstone and sandstone, and contrasts sharply with the quartzite and grits of the central spine; while the summits on the massif of Leenaun Hill are grassy with peak hags, in contrast to the rocky ridges of the central spine.

A long northwest to southeast grassy ridge runs through Leenaun Hill's massif, with Leenaun Hill lying close to the centre of the ridge. To the northwest are the subsidiary peaks of Meall Cheo (578 metres (1,896 ft)), Irish: An Meall Dubh barr thiar thuaidh, whose prominence of 20 metres (66 ft) qualifies it as an Arderin Beg. Further north lies Leenaun Hill Far North-West Top (556 metres (1,824 ft)), Irish: Meall Dubh i bhfad siar ó thuaidh barr, whose prominence of 28 metres (92 ft) also qualifies it as an Arderin Beg. The most northerly subsidiary peak, and the most northerly peak in the Maumturk range, is Búcán (550 metres (1,800 ft)), meaning "spur", whose prominence of 45 metres (148 ft) qualifies it as an Arderin.

To the southwest of Leenaun Hill is a long grassy ridge with the minor subsidiary peak of Taobh Dubh 422 metres (1,385 ft), meaning "black hillside".

Across the "Col of Despondency", lies another subsidiary peak of Maumturkmore 422 metres (1,385 ft), also known as Irish: Binn Bhán (meaning "white peak"), whose geology is a complex mix of marbles, metavolcanics, schists, and grits. Immediately to the south of Maumturkmore is the steep "v-shaped" col of Maam Turk, (Irish: Mám Tuirc, meaning "pass of the boar"), from which the entire range bears its name, and south of which lies the quartzite peaks of the central spine of the Maumturks range, starting with Letterbreckaun, the 2nd-highest peak in the range at 667 metres (2,188 ft).

== Hill walking ==
Leenaun Hill and its subsidiary peaks offer vistas of Killary Harbour, Ireland's deepest fjord, and the Mweelrea mountain range.

The most straightforward route to the summit of Leenaun is the 6-kilometre 2–3 hour roundtrip route from the village of Leenaun and back; however, because of its positioning on a high massif, it can also be climbed as an 11-kilometre 4–5 hour loop-route from Leenaun village in the north, summiting to the ridge south of Leenaun Hill, and then turning northwest to summit Leenaun Hill and most of its northerly subsidiary summits before returning to the village.

Leenaun Hill is climbed as part of the Maamturks Challenge, a 25-kilometre 10–12 hour walk over the full Maumturks range (from Maam Cross to Leenaun), which is considered one of the "great classic ridge-walks of Ireland", but of "extreme grade" due to the circa 7,600 feet of total ascent. Since 1975, the University College Galway Mountaineering Club, has run the annual "Maamturks Challenge Walk" (MCW), and man a checkpoint at Meall Cheo; the summit of Leenaun Hill is optional being southeast of the MCW route as it crosses the "Col of Despondency" from Maumturkmore.

== Gallery ==
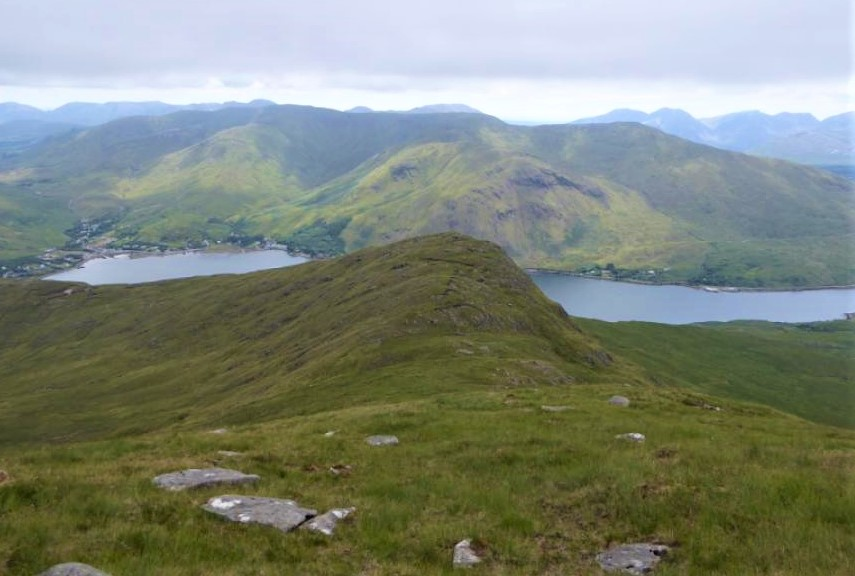
Massif of Leenaun Hill, with Leenaun village, from across Killary Harbour on Ben Gorm

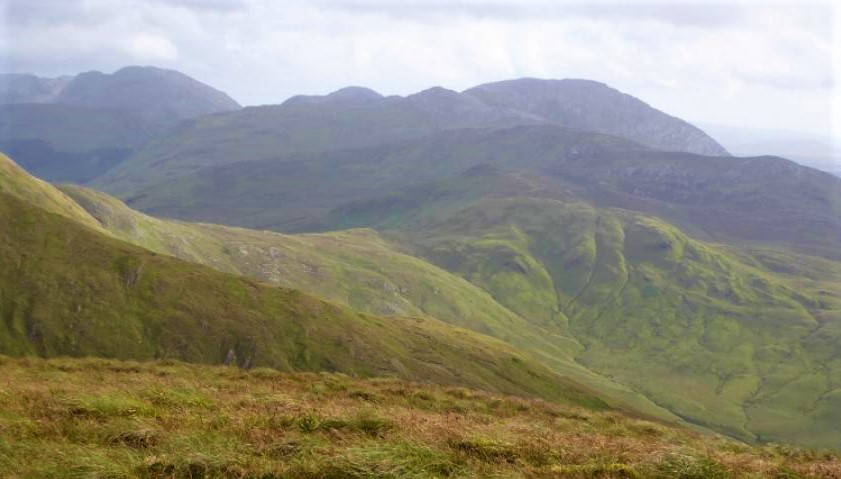
"Col of Despondency" (middle) to Letterbreckaun (middle), with Binn idir an dá Log (far left)

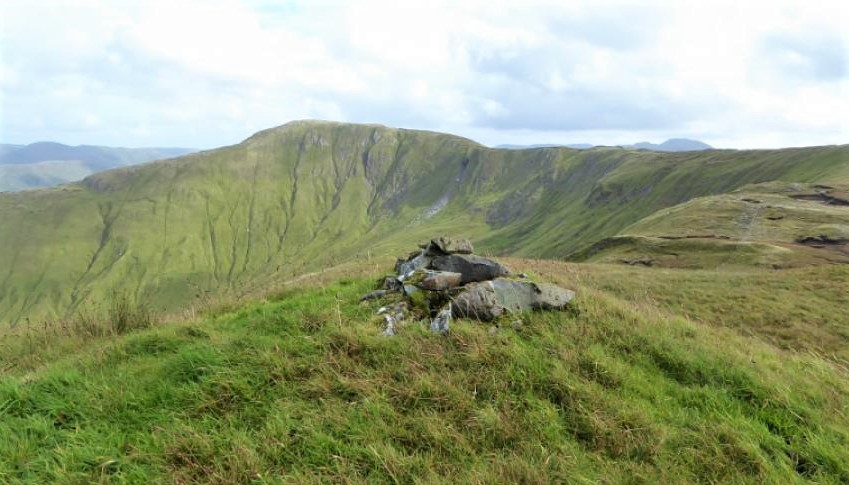
Leenaun Hill as viewed from the cairn at Meall Cheo (578-metres)

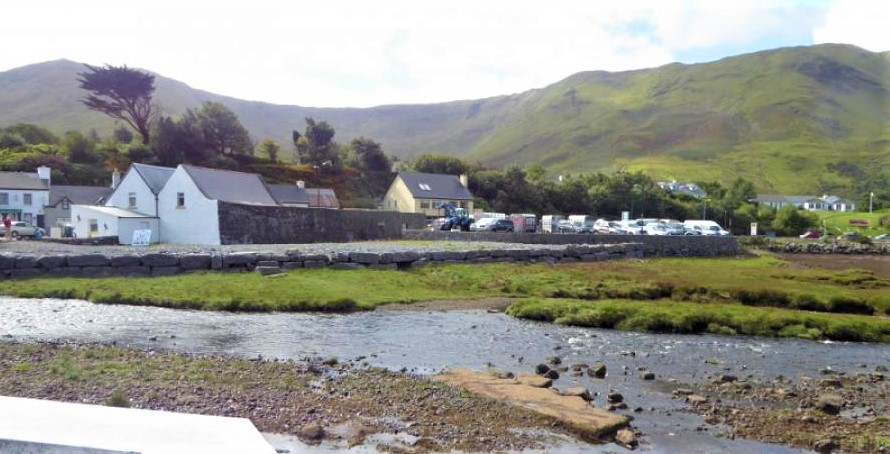
Leenaun Hill (left), and Leenaun Far North West Top (right) from Leenane village

== Bibliography ==
- MountainViews Online Database (Simon Stewart) (2013). A Guide to Ireland's Mountain Summits: The Vandeleur-Lynams & the Arderins. Collins Books. ISBN 978-1-84889-164-7.
- Paul Phelan (2011). Connemara & Mayo - A Walking Guide: Mountain, Coastal & Island Walks. Collins Press. ISBN 978-1848891029.
- Dillion, Paddy (2001). Connemara: Collins Rambler's guide. Harper Collins. ISBN 978-0002201216.
- Dillion, Paddy (1993). The Mountains of Ireland: A Guide to Walking the Summits. Cicerone. ISBN 978-1852841102.

== See also ==
- Twelve Bens, major range in Connemara
- Mweelrea, major range in Killary Harbour
- Lists of mountains in Ireland
- Lists of mountains and hills in the British Isles
- List of Marilyns in the British Isles
- List of Hewitt mountains in England, Wales and Ireland
