= Delphi, County Mayo =

Coordinates: 53.63223°N 9.74548°W

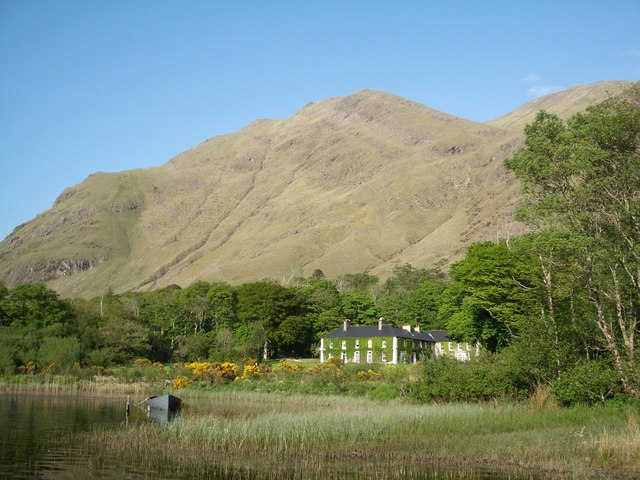
Delphi Lodge from the jetty on Fin Lough

Delphi (/ˈdɛlfaɪ/ or /ˈdɛlfi/; Greek: Δελφοί, [ðelˈfi]) (Note: In English, the name Delphi is pronounced either as /ˈdɛlfaɪ/ or, in a more the Greek-like manner, as /ˈdɛlfiː/. The Greek spelling transliterates as "Delphoi" (with an o); dialectal forms include Belphoi — Aeolian form – and Dalphoi — Phocian form—, as well as other Greek dialectal varieties) is a locality in County Mayo, Ireland. Its English name was coined by the Marquis of Sligo, who built a hunting lodge there.

The valley includes the Owengar River that connects Fin Lough to Doo Lough, between the fjord of Killary Harbour to the south and the Sheeffry Hills to the north, and the Bundorragha River and valley that is surrounded by the Mweelrea Mountains and the neighbouring peaks of Ben Creggan and Ben Gorm. The R335 road passes through it.

== History ==
Delphi Lodge played a central role in the Doolough Tragedy. British monarch Edward VII visited in 1903, and Charles III visited in 1995. County Mayo Gaelic Athletic Association senior footballer Frank Noone built the first adventure centre in Ireland in Delphi.

== Environment ==
The Bundorragha River in the Delphi Valley, feeding into Killary Harbour is one of the most important sites for the Freshwater pearl mussel, which are capable of surviving for up to 140 years.

Farmed salmon believed to have escaped from Killary Harbour in August 2024 were found to pose significant risk to wild Atlantic salmon population in the Delphi system.

== Media ==
Delphi has been covered in international travel and fishing media. A Man May Fish, by Judge T C Kingsmill Moore, devotes a chapter to Alec Wallace and Delphi. Former owner Peter Mantle wrote the book Double Delphi about his experience owning Delphi Lodge. Heather Richie wrote the book The Delphi Salmon Company about the natural and industrial histories of Irish salmon, and her experience immigrating to Ireland to work with Delphi Lodge.

== See also ==
- List of towns and villages in Ireland
