= R378 road =

R378 road may refer to:

- R378 road (Ireland)
- R378 road (South Africa)
