= R335 road =

R335 road may refer to:

- R335 road (Ireland)
- R335 road (South Africa)
