= Sheeffry Hills =

Range of hills in Ireland

- Irish: Cnoic Shíofra
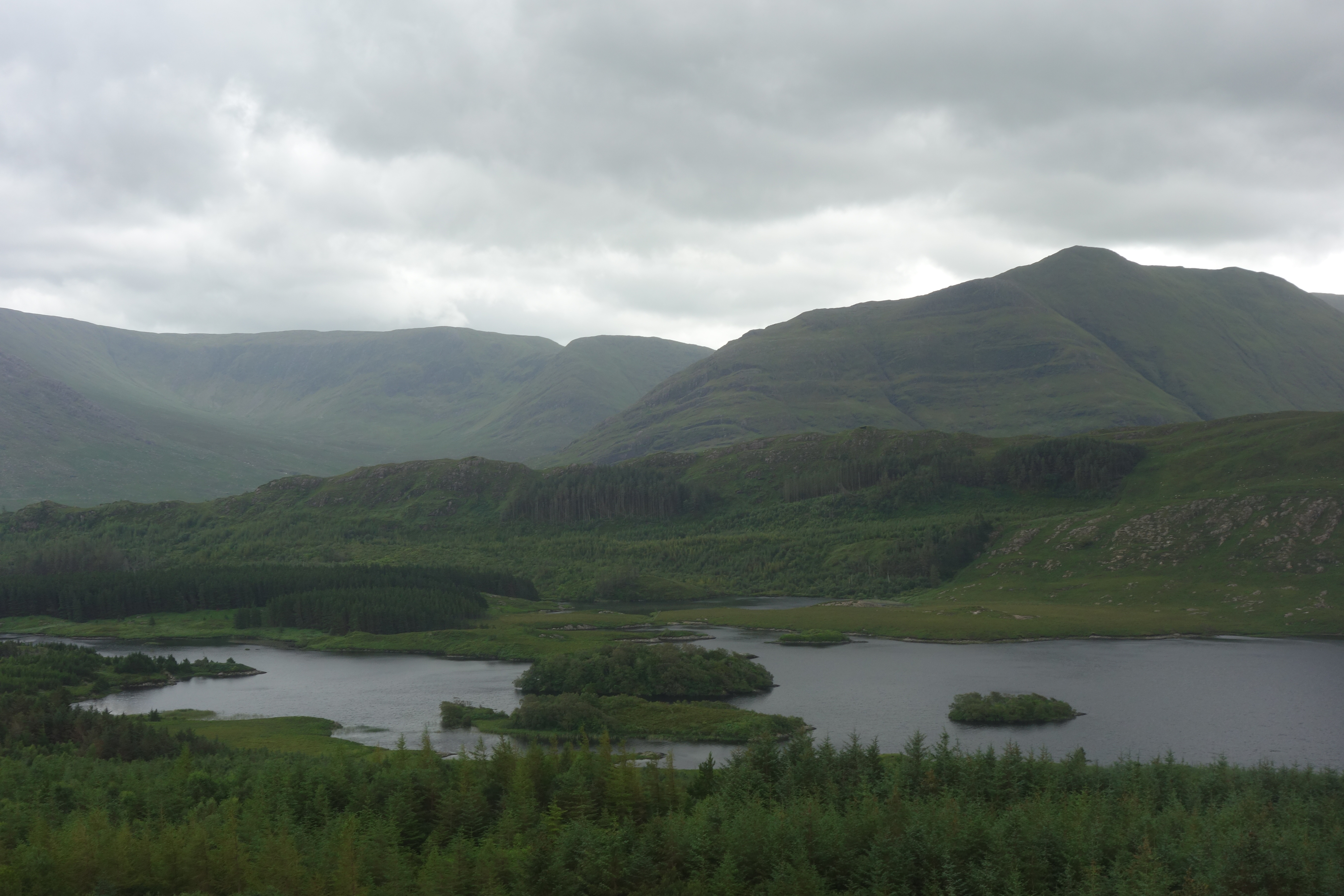
- The eastern Sheeffry Hills and Tawnyard Lough

Highest point
- Peak: Barrclashcame
- Elevation: 772 m (2,533 ft)
- Coordinates: 53°40′N 9°42′W

Geography
- Location within island of Ireland
- Country: Ireland
- Provinces of Ireland: Connacht

The Sheeffry Hills or Sheeffry Mountains (from Irish Cnoic Shíofra, meaning 'hills of the wraith') is a range of hills and mountains in County Mayo, Ireland. It is bounded to the west by Glencullin Lough and Doo Lough; to the south by Glenummera and Tawnyard Lough; to the east by Owenmore Glen and to the north by the Bunowen River.

The highest peak is Barrclashcame (772 m). The range also includes—from west to east—the peaks of Barrclashcame Northwest a.k.a. Storikeennageer (580 m), Tievummera (762 m), Tievnabinnia (742 m), Tawnyard (436 m) and Tawnyrower (510 m).

There are a number of loughs within the Sheeffry Hills, the two biggest being Lugacolliwee and Lugaloughan. The others are—from west to east—Lough Awaniareen, Lough Allisheen, Lough Tariff, Lough Brawn, Lugalough

Settlements in the area include Drummin and Carrowkennedy (to the east), Cregganbaun (west), and Delphi (south). Carrowkennedy was the site of an ambush in June 1921, during the Irish War of Independence.

== See also ==
- Mweelrea
- Ben Gorm
- Delphi, County Mayo
