= Maumtrasna =

Mountain in County Mayo, Ireland

- Mám Trasna
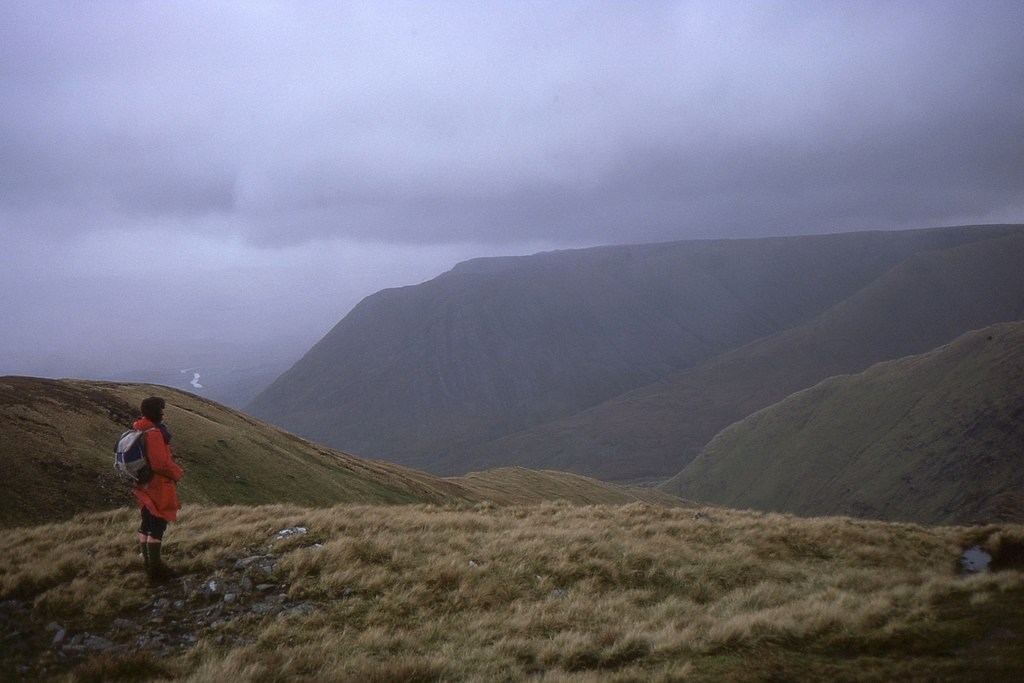
- Maumtrasna mountain from the southwest

Highest point
- Elevation: 682 m (2,238 ft)
- Prominence: 607 m (1,991 ft)
- Listing: P600, Marilyn, Hewitt
- Coordinates: 53.612°N 9.570°W

Naming
- English translation: the pass across
- Language of name: Irish

Geography
- Location within island of Ireland
- Location: County Mayo, Ireland
- Parent range: Partry Mountains
- OSI/OSNI grid: L961637

Maumtrasna, historically Formnamore (Irish: Formna Mór, 'the great shoulder'), is the highest of the Partry Mountains in south County Mayo, Ireland, rising to 682 metres (2,238 ft) above sea level. The summit is broad and flat with several ridges running off it, including Skeltia (An Scoltach), Benwee (Binn Bhuí), Buckaun (An Bocán) and Binnaw (Binn Fheá). The peak of Knocklaur (Cnoc Láir, 'middle hill') stands on the ridge between Maumtrasna and Devilsmother mountains.

The name 'Maumtrasna' comes from Mám Trasna, meaning "the pass across", and originally meant the hill pass on the road between Lough Nafooey and Lough Mask. The townland of Maumtrasna is on the south bank of the Srahnalong river. The townland was the location of the infamous Maumtrasna murders in 1882.

== See also ==
- Lists of mountains in Ireland
- Lists of mountains and hills in the British Isles
- List of P600 mountains in the British Isles
- List of Marilyns in the British Isles
- List of Hewitt mountains in England, Wales and Ireland
