= Doolough Tragedy =

Event in the Great Irish Famine in Mayo

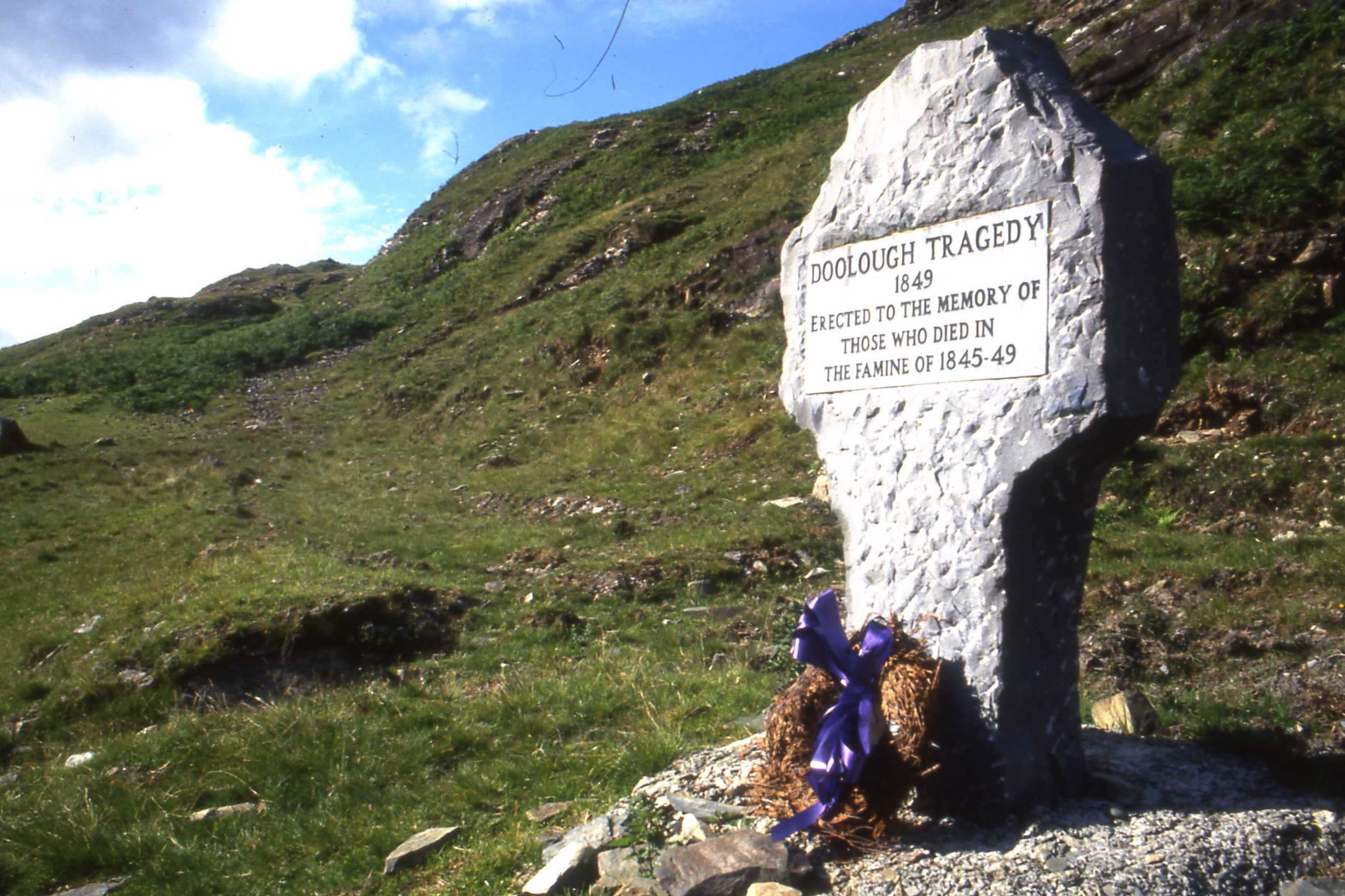
Memorial to the victims in Doolough valley

The Doolough Tragedy was an event that took place during the Great Irish Famine close to Doo Lough in southwest County Mayo. At least seven (and perhaps 20 or significantly more) starving people died after being required to walk a long distance to an inspection by poor law union officials, who would determine whether they would continue to receive outdoor relief.

== Events ==
On Friday 30 March 1849, two officials of the Westport Poor Law Union arrived in Louisburgh to inspect those people in receipt of outdoor relief to verify that they should continue to receive it. The inspection, for some reason, did not take place and the two officials went on to Delphi Lodge – a hunting lodge – 19 kilometres (12 miles) south of Louisburgh at Delphi where they intended to spend the night. Several hundred people who had gathered for the inspection, or later did so, were consequently instructed to appear at Delphi Lodge at 7am the following morning if they wished to continue receiving relief. For much of the night and day that followed seemingly hundreds of destitute and starving people had to undertake what for them, given their existing state of debilitation, was an extremely fatiguing journey, in poor weather.

Upon reaching Delphi Lodge, the group was informed by the officials that they were not eligible for relief, and were promptly sent back to Louisburgh. A letter-writer to The Mayo Constitution newspaper reported shortly afterwards that the bodies of seven people, including women and children, were subsequently discovered on the roadside between Delphi and Louisburgh overlooking the shores of Doolough lake, and that nine or ten more people never reached their homes. While some sources put the total number of deaths at approximately 20 people, local sources suggest that the number who perished was far higher, with it possibly being in the hundreds.

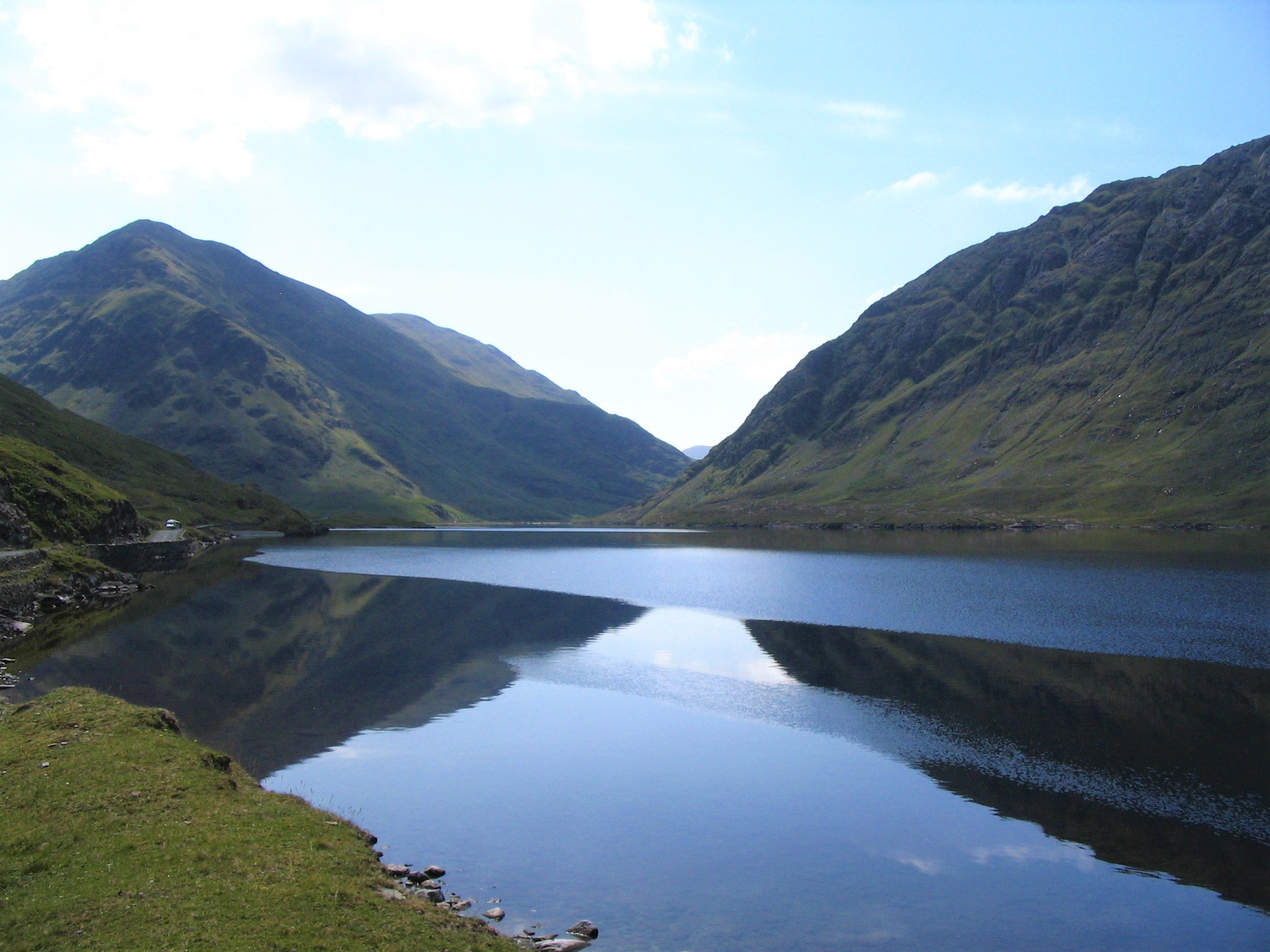
Doolough Pass

A cross and an annual 'Famine Walk' between Louisburgh and Doolough commemorate the event. The monument in Doolough valley has an inscription from Mahatma Gandhi: "How can men feel themselves honoured by the humiliation of their fellow beings?"
