= Partry Mountains =

Mountain range in Ireland

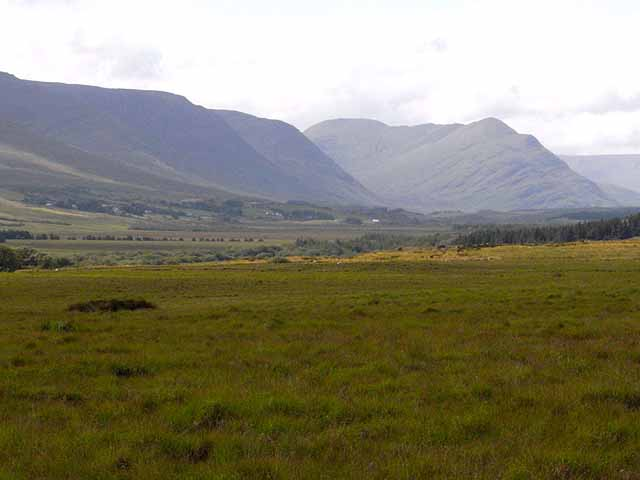
- Partry Mountains from the north

Highest point
- Peak: Maumtrasna
- Elevation: 682 m (2,238 ft)
- Coordinates: 53°39′N 9°30′W

Naming
- Native name: Sliabh Phartraí (Irish)

Geography
- Location within Ireland
- Country: Ireland
- Province: Connacht

The Partry Mountains (Irish: Sliabh Phartraí) is a mountain range in western Connacht, Ireland. It is in an area known as Partry, on the borders of County Mayo and County Galway. The mountains stand between Lough Mask (to the northeast), Lough Corrib (southeast), the Maam Valley (southwest) and the River Erriff (northwest). At the heart of the range is Lough Nafooey.

The highest peak in the Partry Mountains is Maumtrasna, which rises to 682 metres (2,238 ft). Other mountains in the range include Devilsmother, Knocklaur, and Bunnacunneen.
