= Uggool Beach =

- Beach
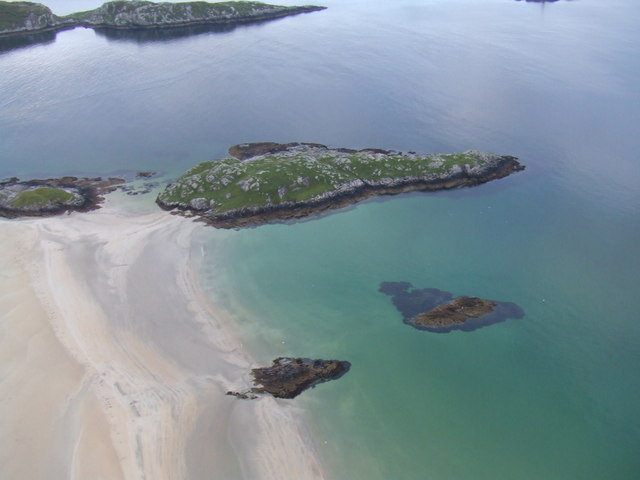
- Dooneen Island beside Uggool Beach

- Location in Ireland
- Coordinates: 53°38′14″N 9°52′39″W
- Country: Ireland
- Province: Connacht
- County: County Mayo

Uggool Beach (Irish: Trá an tOgúl) is a beach in County Mayo, on the west coast of Ireland, located south of the town of Louisburgh. It is situated at the mouth of Killary Harbour to its south, with Silver Strand to its north, Mweelrea mountain to its east and the Atlantic ocean to its west.

Uggool Beach is bordered by the townlands of Uggool, Doovilra and Mweelin. The Bunanakee River flows across Uggool Beach. The tidal Dooneen Island is on the southern edge of the beach.

Uggool Beach has been described as “stunningly beautiful” and “widely regarded as among the finest in Ireland”.

== Controversy ==
Uggool Beach is the subject of one of Ireland’s "longest running disputes over a right of way". In 1989, access to Uggool Beach was "effectively closed" by the erection of fencing. This action gave rise to public protests and altercations near Uggool Beach in subsequent years.

In 1999, the Ombudsman upheld a complaint and ordered Mayo County Council to act to restore public access to Uggool Beach. In the Office of the Ombudsman Annual Report 1999, the Ombudsman held at page 31 that "The fencing is of such an extensive nature, continuing at certain points on to the foreshore and beach, that it is difficult to see it solely as a means of protection of agricultural land. The conclusion that the fencing was intended to prevent access to the beach is unavoidable - nor did the Council dispute this conclusion." In 2001, The Irish Times uncovered correspondence between Mayo County Council and the Ombudsman stating that the council "has decided to acquire access [to Uggool Beach] for the public by means of a Compulsory Purchase Order".

In September 2013, at a sitting of the Oireachtas Joint Committee on Public Service Oversight and Petitions, Ombudsman Emily O’Reilly described the issue as "one of the most intractable issues we ever dealt with". Effective public access to Uggool Beach has not been restored to-date.

Journalist Fintan O'Toole has argued that “Uggool Beach is public but the landowners charge for access to it. The public authorities have failed to uphold the right of citizens to visit what should be one of Ireland’s most spectacular outdoor amenities”.
