= Mac ind Óclaich =

Mac ind Óclaich was the surname of a Gaelic-Irish erenagh and brehon family. They were based in Killary Harbour, between what is now County Mayo and County Galway.

== See also ==
- Aengus Mac ind Oclaich, Archdeacon of Killery, rested in Christ, 1362
- Master Florint Mac in Oclaich died this year, 1366
