= R378 road (Ireland) =

Road in Ireland

R378 road
- Bóthar R378

Route information
- Length: 7.2 km (4.5 mi)

Location
- Country: Ireland
- Primary destinations: County Mayo; Louisburgh (R335); Aghany; Roonagh Quay

Highway system
- Roads in Ireland; Motorways; Primary; Secondary; Regional

The R378 road is a regional road in County Mayo in Ireland. It runs along the south shore of Clew Bay and connects the R335 in Louisburgh to Roonagh Quay, 7.2 kilometres (4.5 mi) away (map of the route).

The government legislation that defines the R378, the Roads Act 1993 (Classification of Regional Roads) Order 2012 (Statutory Instrument 54 of 2012), provides the following official description:

Louisburgh — Roonagh Pier, County Mayo

Between its junction with R335 at Bridge Street Louisburgh and its terminal point at Roonagh Quay via Accony all in the county of Mayo.

== See also ==
- List of roads of County Mayo
- National primary road
- National secondary road
- Regional road
- Roads in Ireland
