= Barrclashcame =

Mountain in Mayo, Ireland

- Barr Chlais Céim
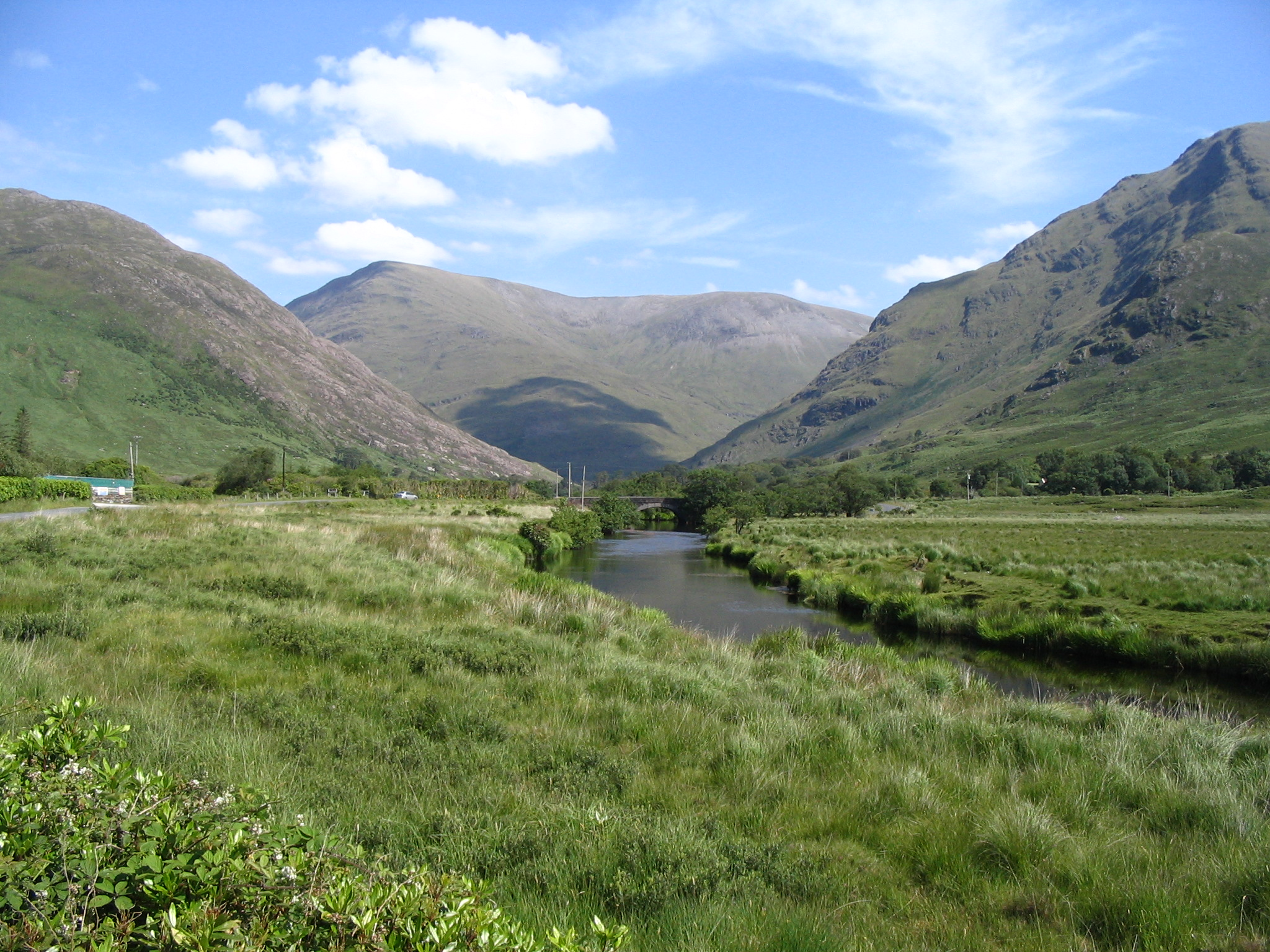
- Barrclashcame (back left) from the Bundorragha River to the south

Highest point
- Elevation: 772 m (2,533 ft)
- Prominence: 707 m (2,320 ft)
- Listing: P600, Hewitt, Marilyn
- Coordinates: 53°39′46″N 9°44′31″W

Naming
- English translation: top of Clais Céim
- Language of name: Irish

Geography
- Location within island of Ireland
- Location: County Mayo, Ireland
- Parent range: Sheeffry Hills
- OSI/OSNI grid: L849695

Barrclashcame (from Irish Barr Chlais Céim, meaning 'top of Clais Céim') is a mountain with a height of 772 metres (2,533 ft) in the Sheeffry Hills of County Mayo, Ireland.

== Geography ==
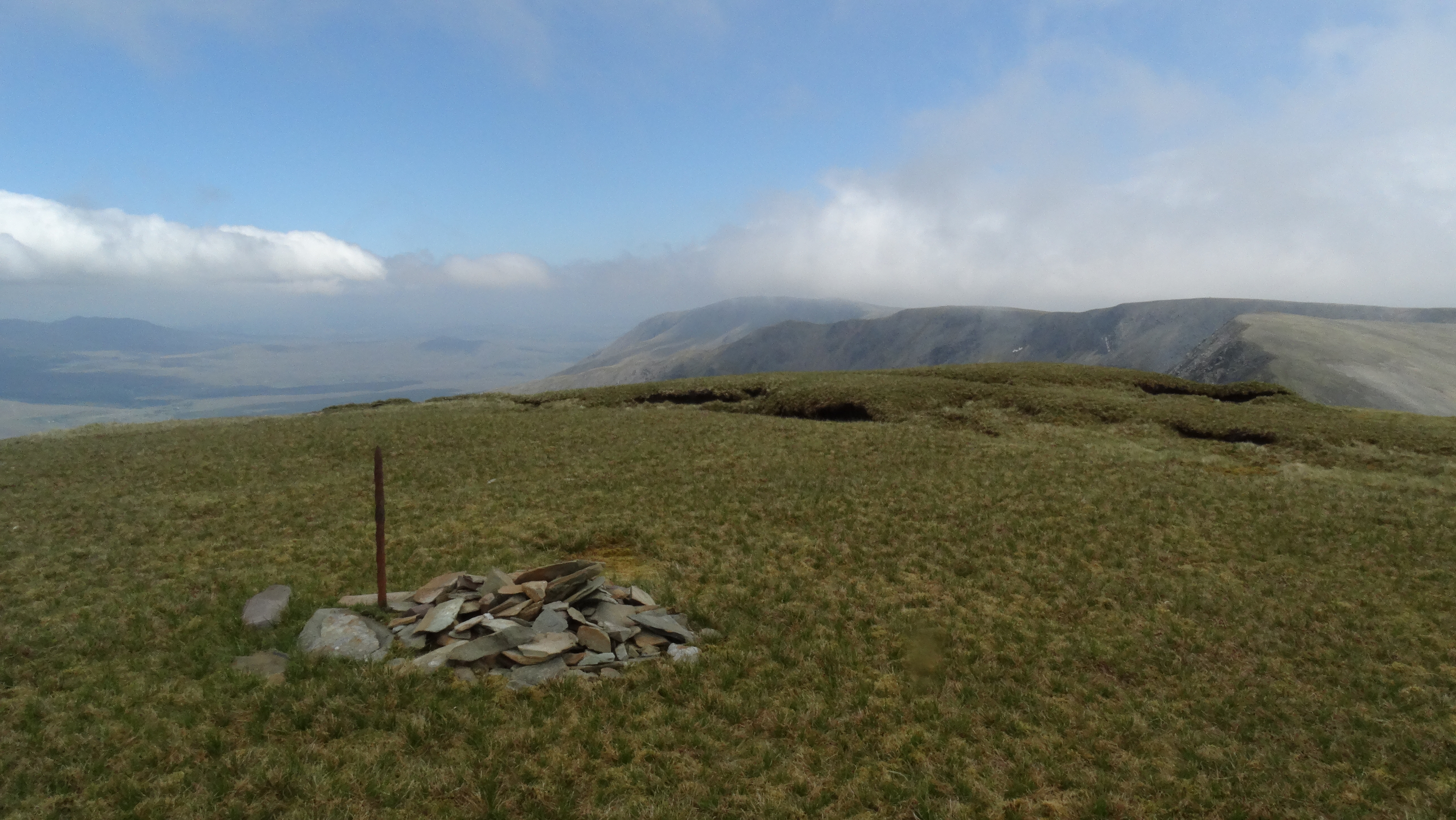
Barrclashcame summit cairn

The mountain is the highest peak of the Sheeffry Hills and stands in the townland of Clashcame, from which it is named.

A short distance to the northwest is the peak called Barrclashcame Northwest or Storikeennageer (580 m) and to the northeast is the peak of Tievummera (762 m).

Barrclashcame overlooks Doo Lough to the southwest and Glenummera to the south, which separate it from the Mweelrea and Ben Gorm mountains.

== See also ==
- Lists of mountains in Ireland
- List of mountains of the British Isles by height
- List of P600 mountains in the British Isles
- List of Marilyns in the British Isles
- List of Hewitt mountains in England, Wales and Ireland
