= R335 road (Ireland) =

Road in Ireland

R335 road
- Bóthar R335
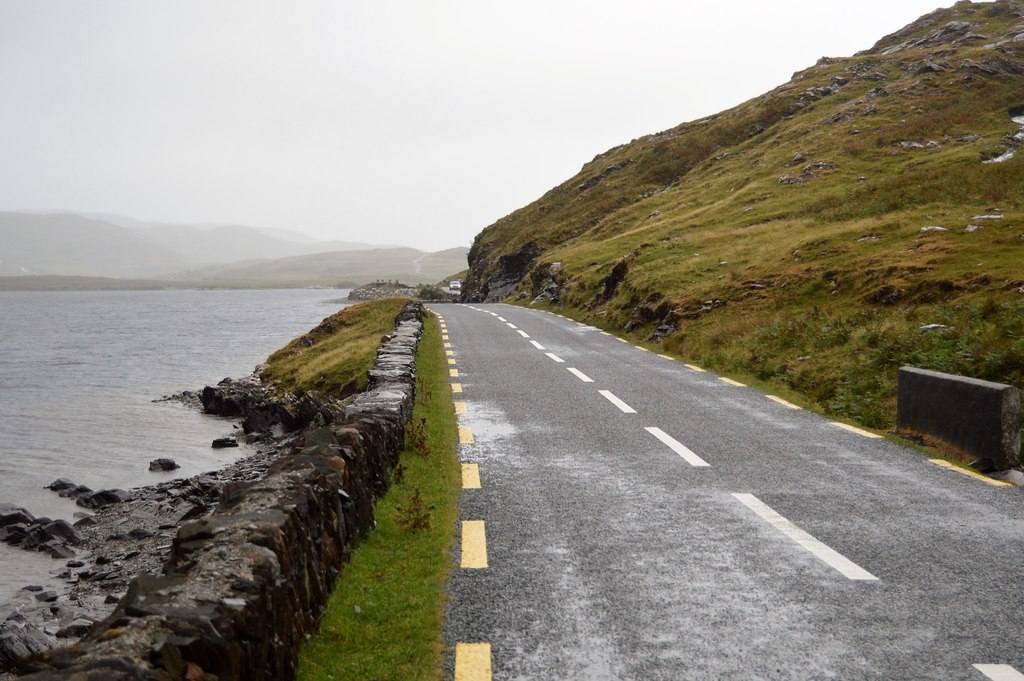
- The R335 through Doo Lough Valley in County Mayo

Route information
- Length: 52 km (32 mi)

Location
- Country: Ireland

Highway system
- Roads in Ireland; Motorways; Primary; Secondary; Regional

The R335 road is a regional road in counties Mayo and Galway in Ireland. It starts in Westport, County Mayo and ends in Leenaun, County Galway. The N59 is a much more direct route between the two towns. The R335 passes through Murrisk (where Croagh Patrick is located), Lecanvey, Louisburgh and Delphi before terminating in Leenaun. It is approximately 52 kilometres (32 mi) long with a speed limit of 80 km/h (50 mph).

== See also ==
- List of roads of County Mayo
- National primary road
- National secondary road
- Roads in Ireland
