= R329 road =

R329 road may refer to:

- R329 road (Ireland)
- R329 road (South Africa)
