= Doo Lough, County Mayo =

Lake in County Mayo, Ireland

Doo Lough
- Dúloch (Irish)
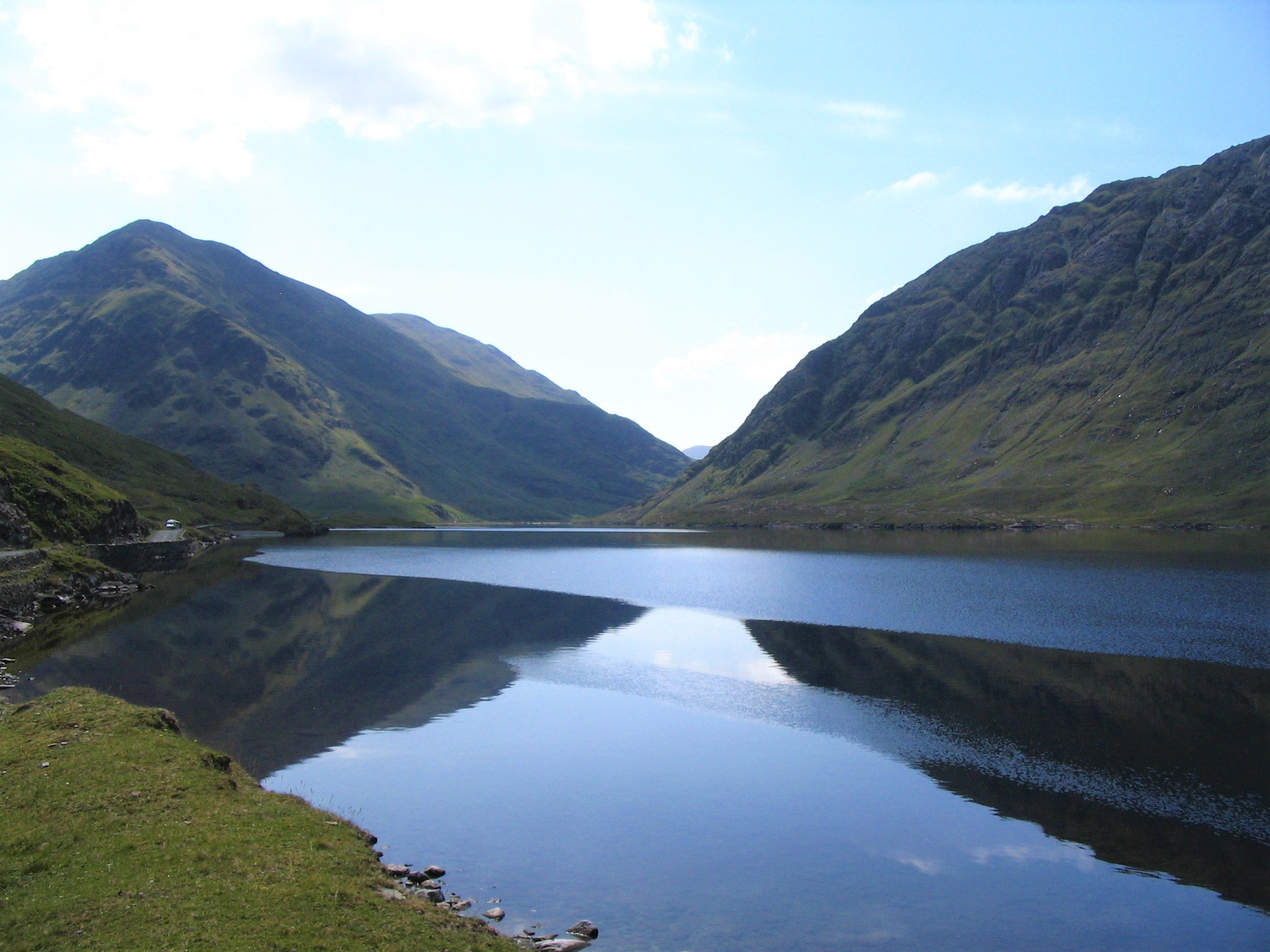
- Looking southeast to the massif of Ben Gorm (centre left), and slopes of Ben Lugmore (right)

- Location in Ireland
- Location: County Mayo
- Coordinates: 53°39′9″N 9°45′49″W
- Primary inflows: Glencullin Lough
- Primary outflows: Owengarr River
- Catchment area: 27.52 km^{2} (10.6 sq mi)
- Basin countries: Ireland
- Max. length: 3.5 km (2.2 mi)
- Max. width: 0.75 km (0.5 mi)
- Surface area: 1.55 km^{2} (0.60 sq mi)
- Max. depth: 46 m (151 ft)
- Surface elevation: 30 m (98 ft)

Doo Lough (Irish: Dúloch, meaning 'black lake') is a freshwater lake in the west of Ireland. It is located in southwest County Mayo on the Murrisk peninsula.

== Geography ==
Doo Lough measures about 4 km (2.5 mi) long and 1 km (0.6 mi) wide. It lies about 30 km (19 mi) southwest of Westport near the village of Delphi. The lake runs in a narrow northwest to southeast direction, and is overlooked by the long ridge of Ben Lugmore 803-metre (2,635 ft), on its southwest shores, and by Barrclashcame 772-metre (2,533 ft) on its northeast shores. At its southeast head, lies the massif of Ben Gorm 700-metre (2,297 ft).

A notable feature on its northwestern head it the deep corrie of Lug More (or Irish: Coum Dubh), from which the Glencullin River feeds into the neighboring Lough Glencullin (the bottom of the corrie is also called the Glencullin valley). Surrounding the corrie is the long ridge of Ben Lugmore and its several subsidiary summits, Ben Lugmore East Top 790-metre (2,592 ft), and Ben Lugmore West Top 790-metre (2,592 ft); while cutting across the headwall (from bottom left to upper right), is grenn grassy feature known as The Ramp, which is used by climbers to gain the ridge of Ben Lugmore from the shores of Doo Lough.

== Hydrology ==
Doo Lough is one of a set of connected lakes near Delphi. Glencullin Lough flows into Doo Lough, which in turn flows into Fin Lough via the Owengarr River. Fin Lough in turn drains into Killary Harbour via the Bundorragha River.

== Natural history ==
Fish species in Doo Lough include brown trout, sea trout, perch, salmon, Arctic char, three-spined stickleback and the critically endangered European eel. The lake is part of the Mweelrea/Sheeffry/Erriff Complex Special Area of Conservation.

== Famine memorial ==
The northern end of Doo Lough is the site of a stone Celtic cross which was erected as a memorial to the 1849 Doolough Tragedy.

== Gallery ==
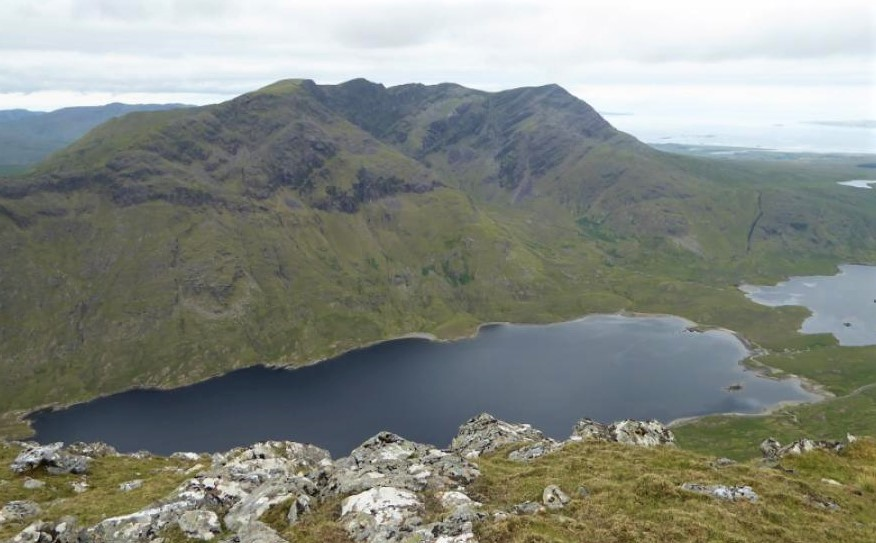
Full ridge of Ben Lugmore, viewed from across Doo Lough, on Barrclashcame

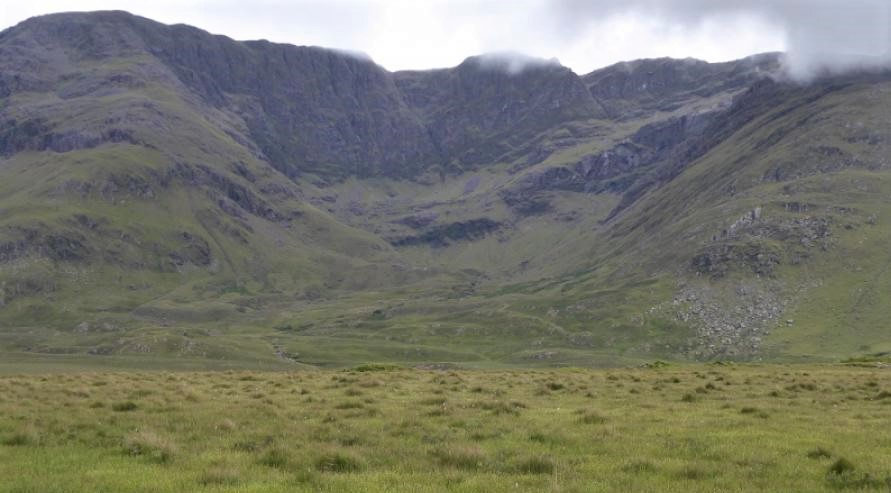
Looking into the corrie of Lug More (Irish: Coum Dubh), and the headwall of Ben Lugmore, with The Ramp running diagonally across the face.

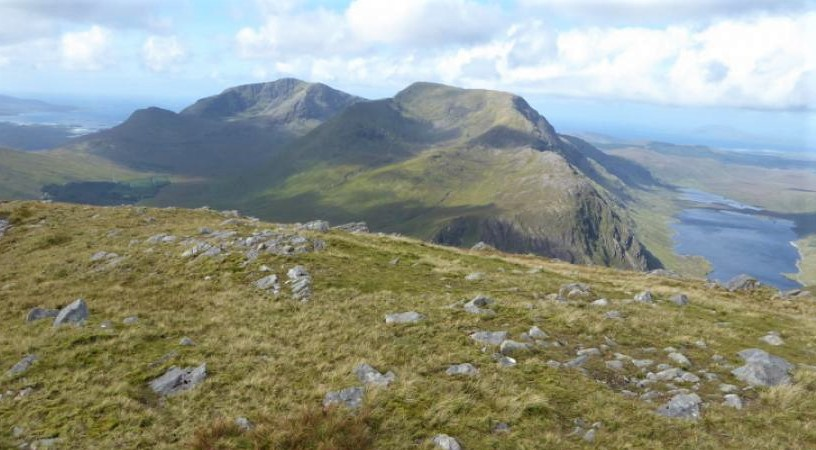
Mweelrea (back left), and Ben Lugmore (centre), and Doo Lough (right), from summit of Ben Gorm

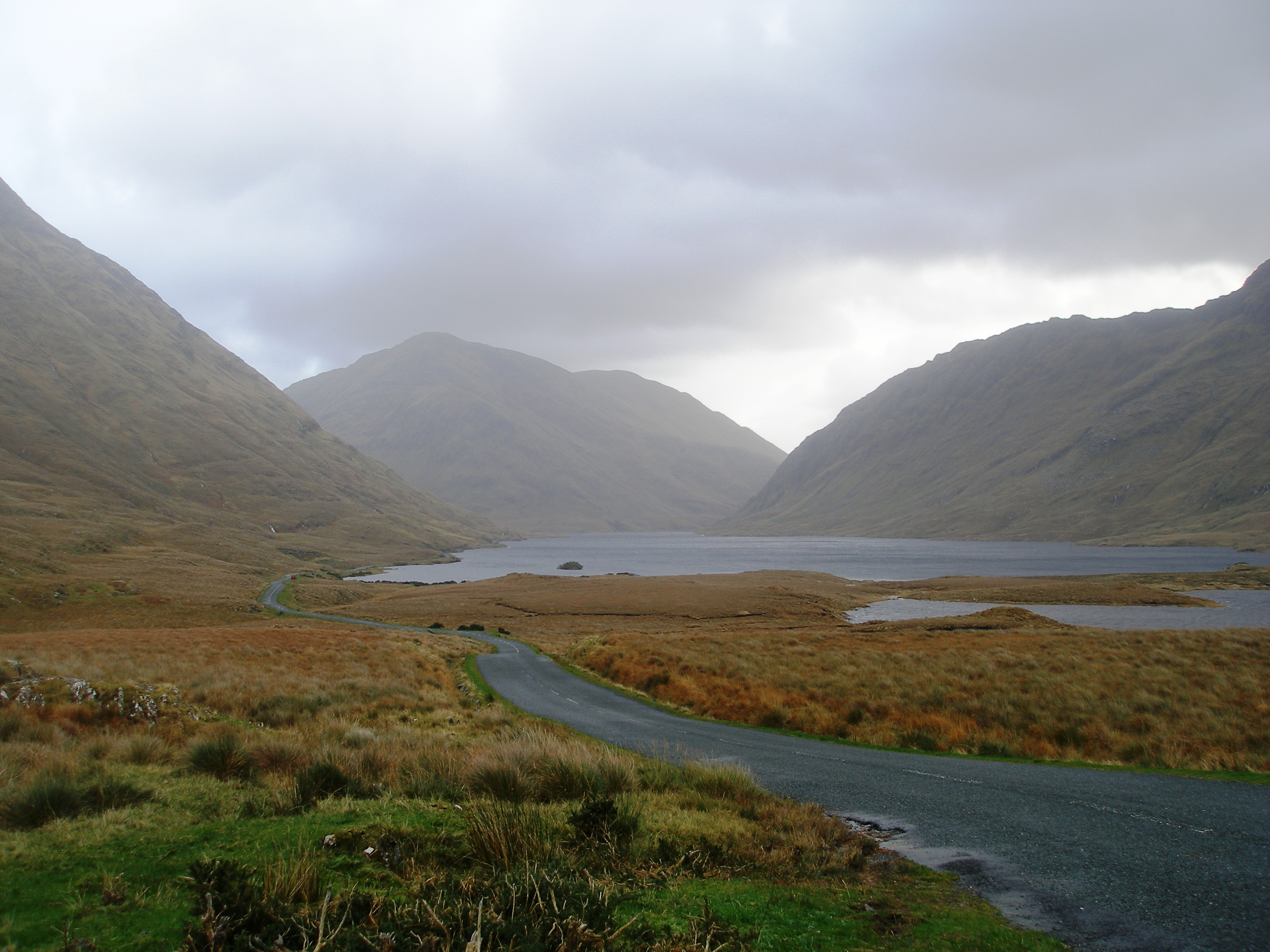
Looking southeast from the top of Doo Lough towards the massif of Ben Gorm

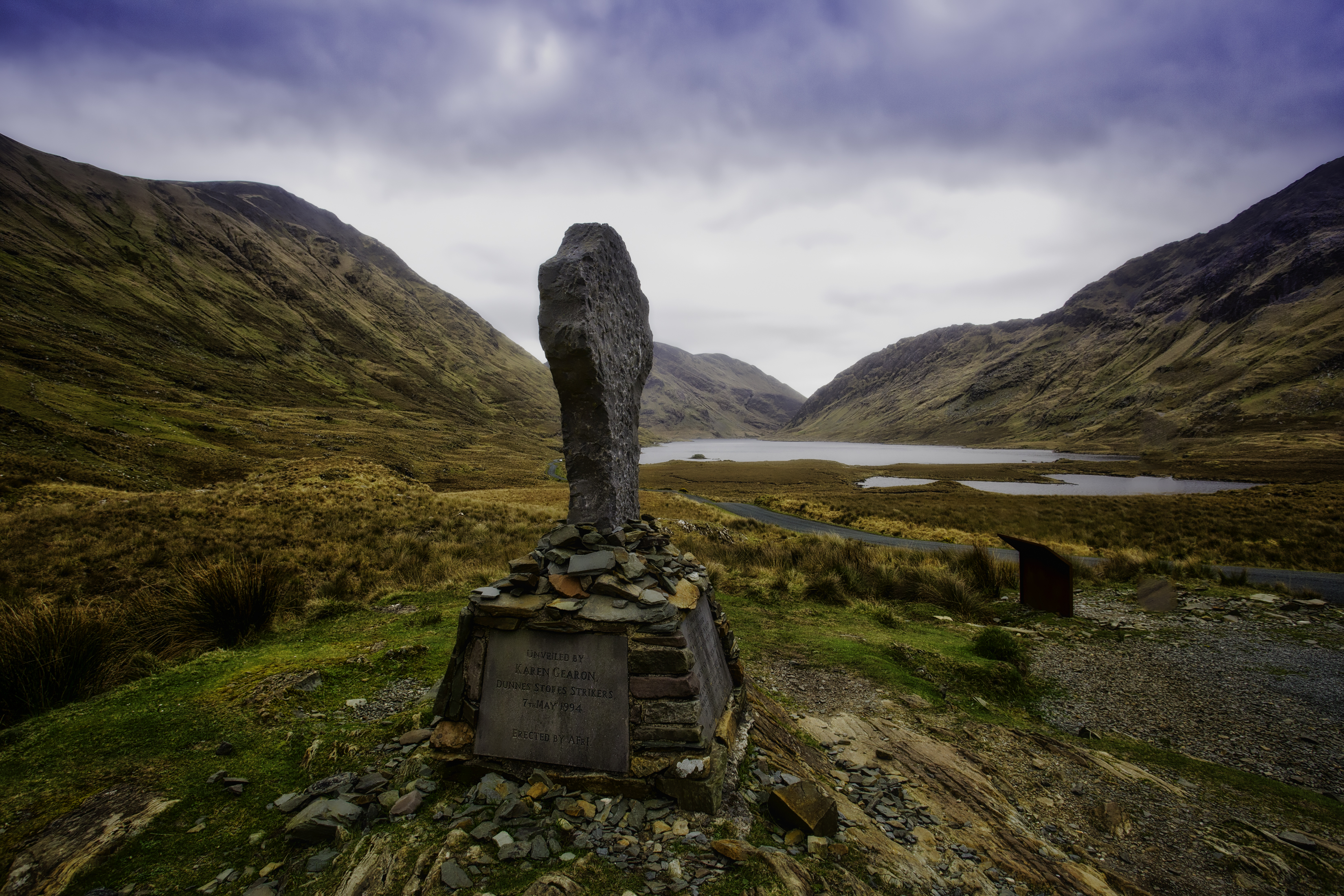
Famine Memorial

== See also ==
- List of loughs in Ireland
