= River Erriff =

River in County Mayo, Ireland

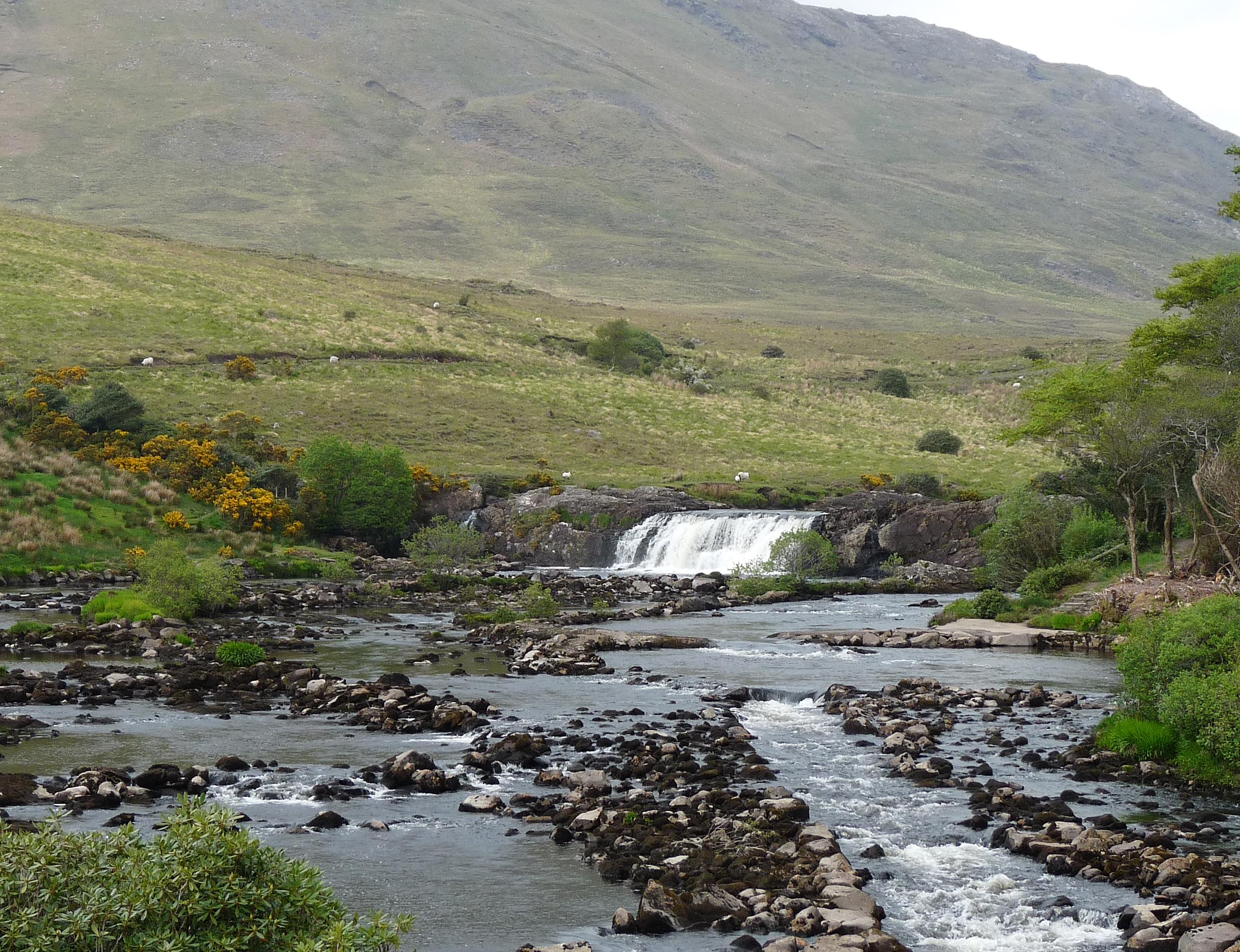
- Aasleagh Falls on the Erriff
- Native name: Abhainn na hOirimhe (Irish)

Physical characteristics
- Source
  - location: Glennacally
- Mouth
  - location: Atlantic Ocean at Killary Harbour
- Length: 33.0 km (20.5 mi)
- Basin size: 163 km^{2} (63 sq mi)
- Discharge
  - average: 8.16 m^{3}/s (288 cu ft/s)

The River Erriff (Irish: Abhainn na hOirimhe) is a river in Ireland, flowing through County Mayo. A spate river, it is characterised by lively streams and deep fish-holding pools. A waterfall called Aasleagh Falls (Irish: Eas Liath, meaning 'grey waterfall') is near the mouth of the river.

== Course ==
The River Erriff forms from the union of the Owenree and Owenmore Rivers in Glennacally. It flows west-southwest parallel to the N59, passing under Aasleagh Bridge and entering Killary Harbour.

== Wildlife ==
The River Erriff is a noted salmon and trout fishery.

== See also ==
- Rivers of Ireland
