= Devilsmother =

Mountain in Connemara, Ireland

- Magairlí an Deamhain/Binn Gharbh
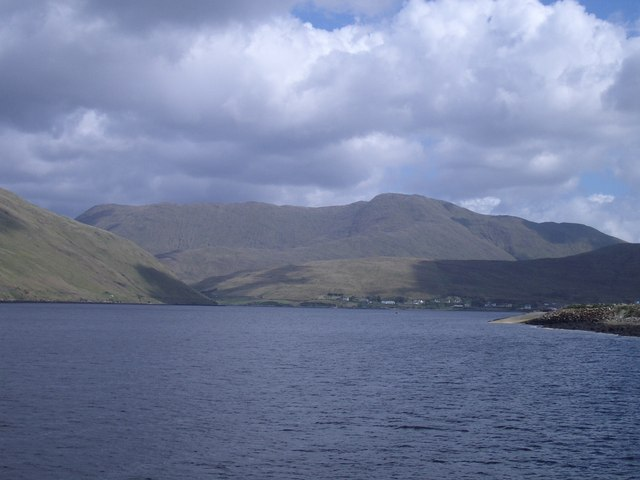
- Devilsmother seen from Killary Harbour

Highest point
- Elevation: 645 m (2,116 ft)
- Prominence: 280 m (920 ft)
- Listing: Hewitt, Marilyn
- Coordinates: 53°36′01″N 9°38′17″W

Geography
- Location within Ireland
- Location: Border of County Galway and Mayo, Ireland
- Parent range: Partry Mountains
- OSI/OSNI grid: L915624
- Topo map: OSi Discovery 37

Devilsmother is a 645-metre-high (2,116 ft) mountain in Connemara, Ireland. Devilsmother is in the Partry Mountains, at the head of Killary Harbour, overlooking the Western Way long-distance path. It sits on the border between County Galway (to the south) and County Mayo (to the north).

== Etymology ==
The mountain has two Irish language names: Magairlí an Deamhain (meaning "the demon's testicles") and Binn Gharbh (meaning "rough peak"). The anglicized spellings Mogarlyandoon and Ben Garrif appear on some historical maps. Originally, it seems that Magairlí an Deamhain was the knobbly end of the mountain's northern ridge, while Binn Gharbh was the mountain as a whole. The English name Devilsmother may be "a euphemistic false translation" or may be based on an alternative name.
