= Killary Harbour =

Sea inlet between Counties Galway and Mayo, Ireland

- An Caoláire Rua (Irish)
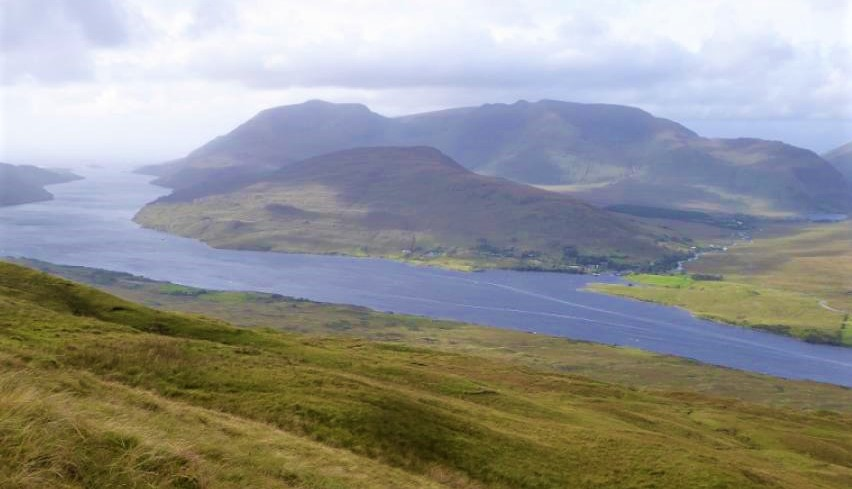
- View westward

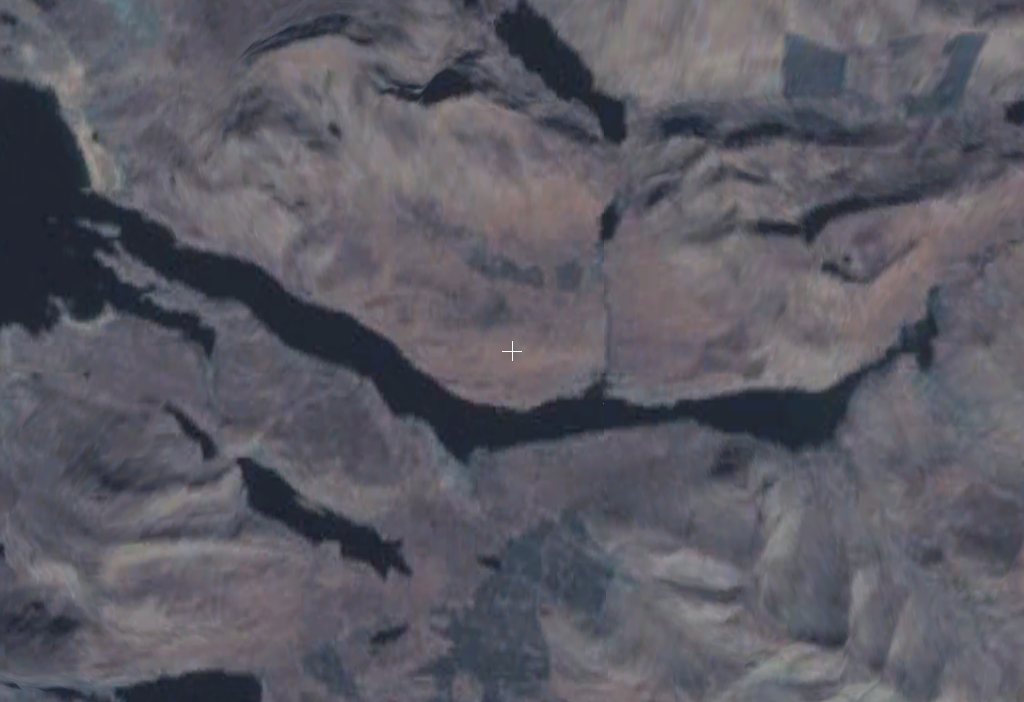

- Location within island of Ireland
- Location: County Galway; County Mayo
- Coordinates: 53°37′N 9°48′W
- Ocean/sea sources: Atlantic Ocean
- Basin countries: Ireland
- Max. length: 16 km (10 mi)
- Average depth: 45 m (148 ft)
- Settlements: Rossroe, Leenaun

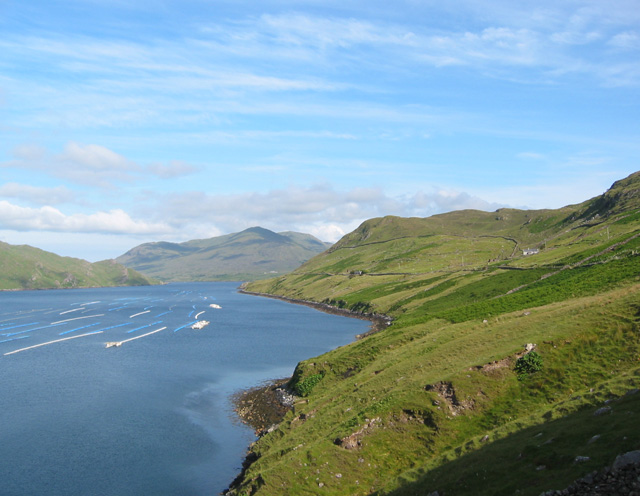
View southeast along Killary Harbour

Killary Harbour or Killary Fjord (Irish: An Caoláire Rua, meaning 'the red fjord') is a fjord or fjard on the west coast of Ireland, in northern Connemara. To its north is County Mayo and the mountains of Mweelrea and Ben Gorm; to its south is County Galway and the Maumturk Mountains.

== Structure ==
The flooded valley is 16 kilometres (10 mi) long, and in the centre over 42–45 metres (138–148 ft) deep; the sea bed is higher outside its mouth, as is normal for a fjord. For nearly half its length, it runs south east from the Atlantic, and then it crooks and runs directly east. It narrows after the infall of the Bundorragha River, and then widens in the vicinity of Leenane. In its innermost section, it becomes very narrow, widens where a small river comes in from the south, and ends with the line of the valley of the River Erriff. The river itself does not enter on the main line of the Harbour but curves northwards and then runs south into the inlet.

The northern shore rises sharply to a much greater extent than the southern, which is in places merely hilly. On that northern shore lies the mountain Mweelrea, Connacht's highest, rising to 814 metres (2,670 ft), and the sides of which fall steeply into the inlet, with Uggool Beach at its western edge. To the south rise the Maumturk Mountains and the Twelve Bens. The island of Inishbarna (Inis Bearna or Inis Barna) is situated at the mouth of Killary Harbour. The area contains some of Ireland's most dramatic scenery.

=== Nature ===
Killary has for centuries been known as a fjord - "the only fjord in Ireland" or sometimes "one of 2–4 fjord-type inlets" on the island. There has been argument in at least one peer-reviewed paper that it is in fact one of three glacial fjards (shallower than true fjords) in Ireland, the others being Lough Swilly and Carlingford Lough. A key point in such argument is that it lacks extensive steep cliff walls, but this does not take full account of the underwater sides of the valley, and the shape of its bed. The matter was considered in a dedicated peer-reviewed paper, "An Oceanographical Survey of Killary Harbour...," that concluded that Killary was a fjord. The landform was shaped by a massive glacier, carving its way from the land to the Atlantic Ocean.

=== Rivers and streams ===
The Erriff River flows into the head of the inlet, and multiple smaller rivers and streams enter along its length. These include the Bunanakee River flowing across Uggool Beach near the mouth, the Bundorragha River (with tributaries including the Owennaglogh, Sruhaunboy, Owengar from Finlough to Doolough, Glenummera), and the Lahill River at Leenaun, and others. On the Erriff River just above Killary are the Aasleagh Falls.

== Flora and fauna ==
The Harbour is a sheltered waterway, and otter are sometimes found. Both grey and harbour seals, and dolphins, and sharks, can be sighted, and on at least one occasion there was a bearded seal sighting. Salmon and sea trout are also encountered, and provide food for the seals. Some bird species frequenting the area include mallard duck and other breeds of duck, grey heron, barnacle goose, mute swan and whooper swan, and plover.

=== Marine zoology study ===
The sea-loch has attracted naturalists studying marine zoology. Irish naturalist, writer, and historian Emily Lawless, in an essay from 1898, recalled renting a cottage by the 'Greater Killary' on a research trip, in order to "extract . . . every wriggling, writhing, prickly, slimy, glassy . . . creature" from its waters, to document and analyse them.

== Settlement ==
There are today two minor settlements nearby. On the southern side near the mouth of the Harbour lies the hamlet of Rosroe, between Killary and Little Killary, while the village of Leenaun (Leenane) lies two thirds of the length of the valley inland to the east. Leenaun has a hotel and guesthouses and there are one more of each at Delphi, in a valley running down to Killary Harbour from the north.

Close to Rosroe there is an old building which now houses a hostel. This building was formerly a modest house which was used by Ludwig Wittgenstein, the famous philosopher, as a quiet place to write shortly after World War II. A plaque acknowledging this was unveiled by President Mary Robinson in 1993.

Near to Rosroe begins the so-called Green Road, a rough roadway running along the side of the valley back east towards Leenaun. It stretches for approximately nine kilometres and was part of the famine relief program during the 19th century. This road passes the last remnants of the hamlet of Foher, which disappeared in the period of the Great Famine.

A second "lost village" – Uggool – lay just north-east of the mouth of the inlet, above Uggool Beach.

== Economy ==
Killary draws considerable tourist traffic and a catamaran service run by "Killary Fjord Boat Tours" from April to mid-October is a notable local employer. Aquaculture is also important locally with a salmon farm based at Rosroe while mussel rafts are a common sight further to the east.

== Bibliography ==
- London, UK, 1994: Immel Publishing Ltd.: Whilde, Tony, "The Natural History of Connemara" -
- Glasgow, Scotland, UK, 1989: University of Glasgow, Dept. of Geology and Applied Geology: Graham, J.R., Leake, B.E., Ryan, P.D., "The Geology of South Mayo, Western Ireland" - illus., 75pp. - incl. discussion of the Silurian rocks of southern Mayo and northern Galway
- Reston, VA, USA, 1988: US Geological Survey, Office of Water Research and Technology, Water Resources Scientific Information Center: Selected Water Resources Abstracts, Volume 21, Part 2 - Hydrography and distribution of phytoplankton in Killary Harbour, a fjord in western Ireland
