= Mweelrea =

Mountain in Mayo, Ireland

- Cnoc Maol Réidh
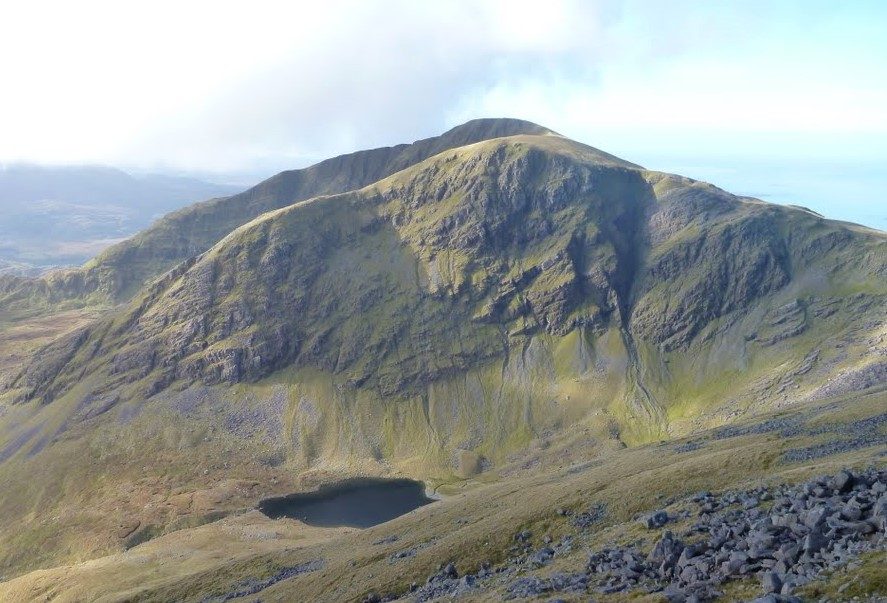
- Mweelrea and the corrie lake of Lough Bellawaum, viewed from Ben Lugmore in the east

Highest point
- Elevation: 814 m (2,671 ft)
- Prominence: 779 m (2,556 ft)
- Listing: County top (Mayo), P600, 100 Highest Irish Mountains, Marilyn, Hewitt, Arderin, Simm, Vandeleur-Lynam
- Coordinates: 53.63724°N 9.830358°W

Naming
- English translation: smooth bald hill
- Language of name: Irish
- Pronunciation: /mwiːlˈreɪ/

Geography
- Location within island of Ireland
- Location: County Mayo, Ireland
- Parent range: Mweelrea Mountains
- OSI/OSNI grid: L7898366810
- Topo map: OSi Discovery 37

Geology
- Mountain type(s): Sandstone & conglomerate, ignimbrite bedrock

Climbing
- Easiest route: "Silver Strand"
- Normal route: "The Ramp" (Lug More corrie)

Mweelrea (/mwiːlˈreɪ/; from Irish Cnoc Maol Réidh 'bald hill with the smooth top') is a mountain on the Atlantic coast of County Mayo, Ireland. Rising to 814 metres (2,671 ft), it is the highest mountain in the western province of Connacht, and is noted for its southeastern cliff-lined corries, and its views. Mweelrea overlooks Killary Harbour and is at the heart of a "horseshoe-shaped" massif that includes the peaks of Ben Lugmore and Ben Bury. The massif is called the Mweelrea Mountains or the Mweelrea Range.

Mweelrea is also the 26th-highest peak in Ireland on the Arderin list, and the 34th-highest on the Vandeleur-Lynam list.

== Geology ==
The geology of what is known as the Mweelrea Formation is very different from that of the Twelve Bens, on the other side of Killary Harbour. At a summary level, the Mweelrea Formation consists of Ordovician period sandstones originally deposited on large alluvial fans, and distally‐equivalent alluvial plains and delta fans. Interbedded with these sandstones are tuffs, being ash deposits from Ordovician period volcanos.

== Geography ==
Mweelrea, and its subsidiary peaks, form the southern half of the "horseshoe-shaped" massif of the Mweelrea Mountains, which are bounded by Killary Harbour, Ireland's deepest fjord, to the south, and Doo Lough to the north.

The valley in the centre of this "horseshoe" is the townland of Glenconnelly (Irish: Gleann Choinnile). Two deep corries lie at the head of the Glenconnelly valley, below Mweelrea's southeast face; the southerly corrie contains Lough Lugaloughan, while the northerly corrie contains Lough Bellawaum; both are drained by the Sruhaunbunatrench River, which empties into the Bundorragha River, which itself flows into Killary Harbour.

Mweelrea at 814 metres (2,671 ft), is the highest mountain in massif, and is the provincial top for Connacht. Mweelrea's prominence of 779 metres (2,556 ft) qualifies it as a Marilyn, and it also ranks it as the 16th-highest mountain in Ireland on the MountainViews Online Database, 100 Highest Irish Mountains, where the minimum prominence threshold is 100 metres.

Northeast of Mweelrea is Ben Bury (or Irish: Ucht an Chreagáin, meaning "breast of the little crag"; it is also known as "Oughty Craggy"), at 795 metres (2,608 ft), and whose prominence of 60 metres (200 ft) qualifies it as a Vandeleur-Lynam (it is the 43rd-highest Vandeleur-Lynam in Ireland).

Further east around the "horseshoe" lies the long high summit ridge of Ben Lugmore (and its subsidiary peaks), that is only slightly lower than Mweelrea at 803 metres (2,635 ft), and its northeast face forms the headwall of the cliff-lined Lug More Irish: Coum Dubh corrie.

Southwest of Mweelrea is the southern arm of the "horseshoe", which is both lower and less sustained than the northern side. It includes the Mweelrea SE Spur at 495 metres (1,624 ft) (sometimes called "point-495" in guidebooks), and finishes with the isolated Teevnabinnia (Irish: Taobh na Binne, meaning "side of the peak"), whose height is only 379 metres (1,243 ft), but whose prominence of 214 metres (702 ft) qualifies it as a Marilyn. West of Mweelrea lie the County Mayo beaches of Uggool Beach and Silver Strand.

== Recreation ==
=== Hill walking ===
As the highest mountain in Connacht, Mweelrea is climbed in "Four Peaks Challenge" formats, being the highest mountains in the four provinces of Ireland.

The fastest and most straightforward way to summit Mweelrea is via the 8–kilometre 3-hour Silver Strand Route.

A longer route is the 13-kilometre 6-hour round trip via the Lug More (or Irish: Coum Dubh) corrie and the valley of Glen Glencullin that take in the summits of Ben Bury and Ben Lugmore. A notable feature known as The Ramp is used, which crosses the headwall of this corrie at mid-way, from east to west in an upward slope; reaching the ridge of Ben Lugmore at a col with Ben Bury. While this route is direct, caution is advised in properly finding The Ramp, as the corrie has extensive cliffs.

Mweelrea is also climbed as part of the 15-kilometre 6-7 hour Mweelrea Horseshoe, which is described by a notable Irish guidebook as one of "the top three" in Ireland. The circuit starts and ends at the Delphi Mountain Resort, and takes in all the peaks of the massif of Mweelrea, including Ben Lugmore (and its subsidiary peaks), Ben Bury, Mweelrea and the Mweelrea SE Spur (or point 495-metres).

=== Rock climbing ===
While the main rock-climbing on the Mweelrea massif is on the northeastern slopes of Ben Lugmore (see here), there are long Grade 1 and 2 scrambles on the northeastern slopes of Mweelrea/Ben Bury.

=== Winter climbing ===
The Lough Bellawaum corrie, Mweelrea's northeastern corrie, also has a number of winter-climbs, the most notable of which are Blue Route (Grade II/III, 270 m), and Red Route (Grade III, 305 m).

== Gallery ==
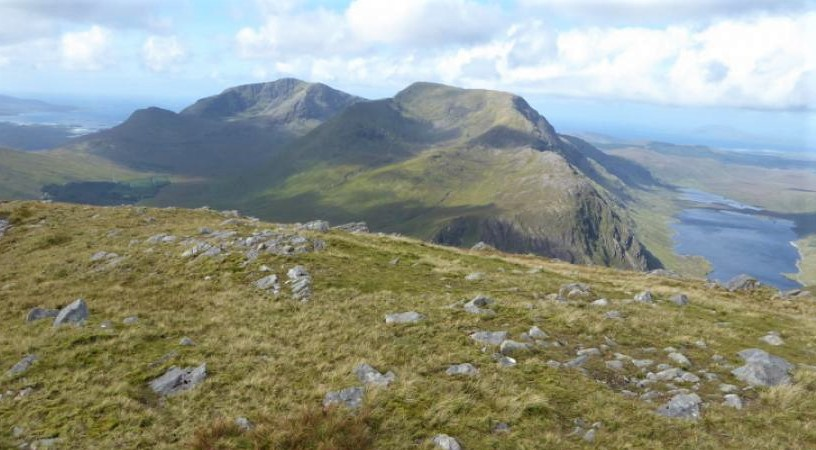
Mweelrea (back left), and Ben Lugmore (centre), viewed from the east on the summit of Ben Gorm

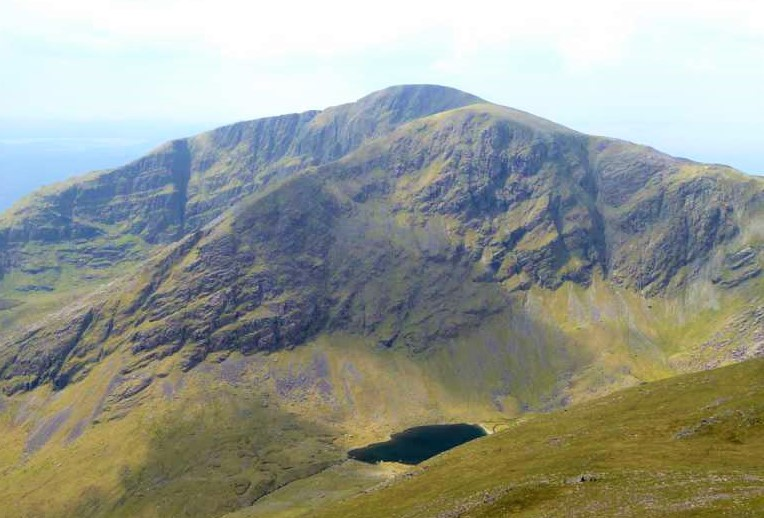
Mweelrea and the corrie lake of Lough Bellawaum, as viewed from Ben Lugmore

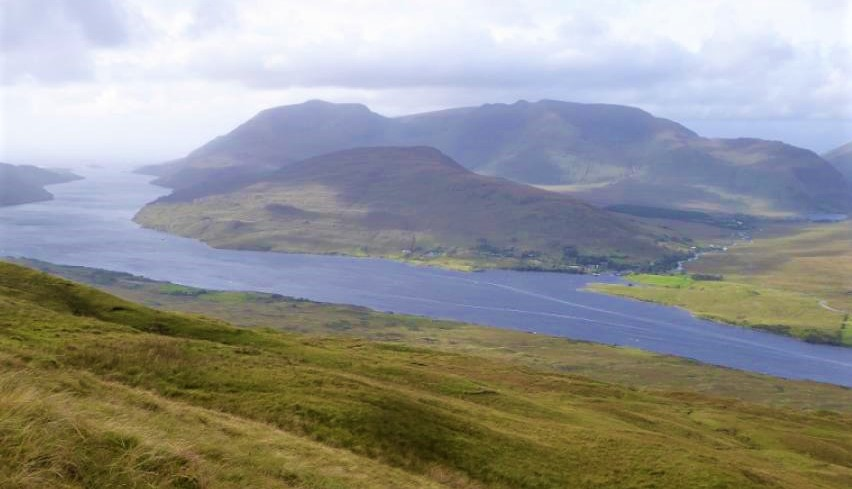
Mweelrea massif as viewed from Leenaun Hill, with Mweelrea (back left), Ben Lugmore (back, right) and Teevnabinnia (centre, front)

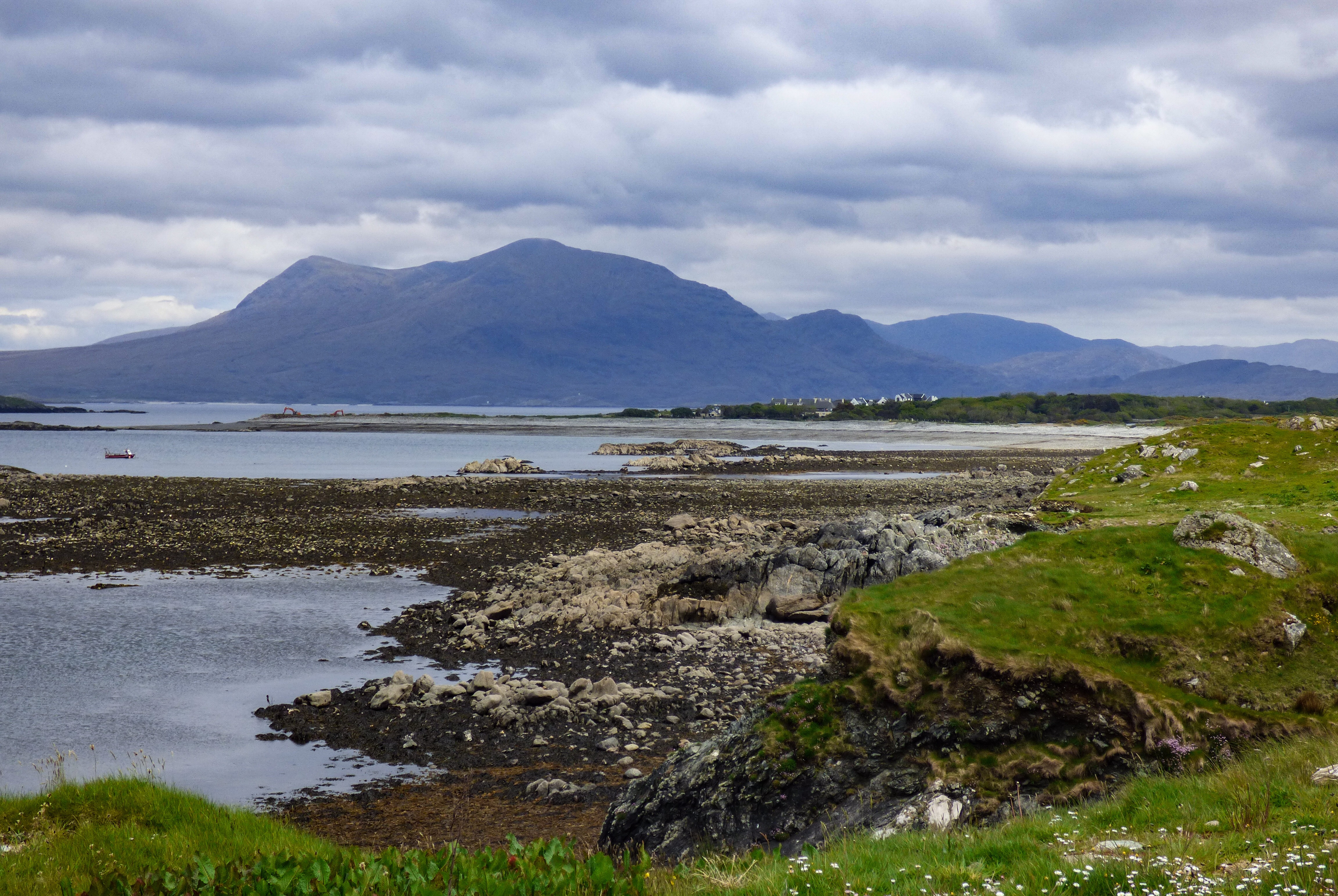
Mweelrea viewed from the south in Renvyle

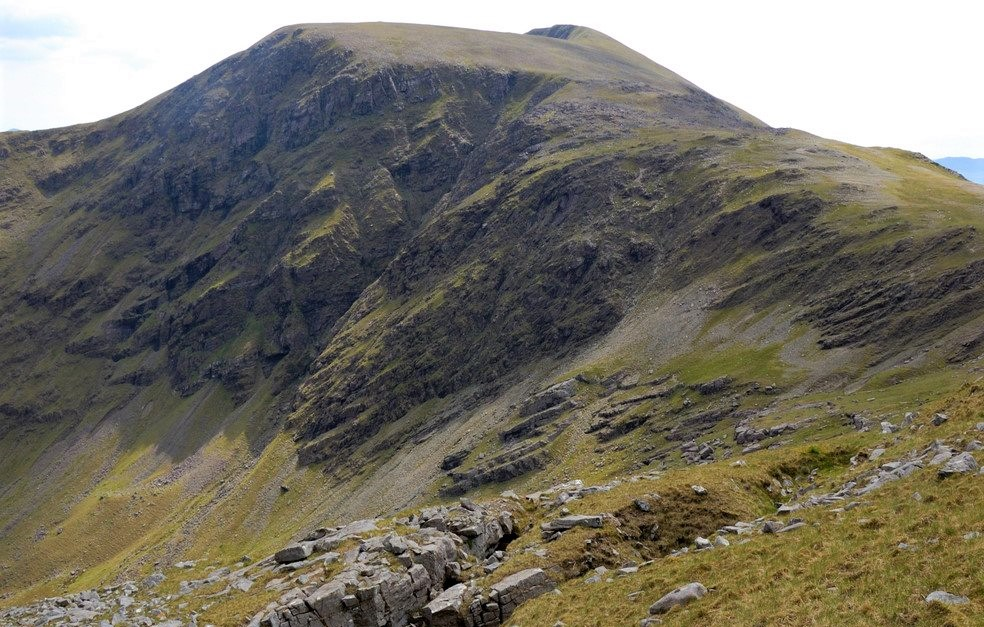
Mweelrea eastern summit ridge as viewed from Ben Bury

== Bibliography ==
- Fairbairn, Helen (2014). Ireland's Best Walks: A Walking Guide. Collins Press. ISBN 978-1848892118.
- MountainViews Online Database (Simon Stewart) (2013). A Guide to Ireland's Mountain Summits: The Vandeleur-Lynams & the Arderins. Collins Books. ISBN 978-1-84889-164-7.
- Paul Phelan (2011). Connemara & Mayo - A Walking Guide: Mountain, Coastal & Island Walks. Collins Press. ISBN 978-1848891029.
- Dillion, Paddy (2001). Connemara: Collins Rambler's guide. Harper Collins. ISBN 978-0002201216.
- Dillion, Paddy (1993). The Mountains of Ireland: A Guide to Walking the Summits. Cicerone. ISBN 978-1852841102.

== See also ==
- Maumturks, major range in Connemara
- Twelve Bens, major range in Connemara
- List of Irish counties by highest point
- Lists of mountains in Ireland
- Lists of mountains and hills in the British Isles
- List of P600 mountains in the British Isles
- List of Marilyns in the British Isles
- List of Hewitt mountains in England, Wales and Ireland
