= Ben Gorm =

Mountain in Mayo, Ireland

- An Bhinn Ghorm
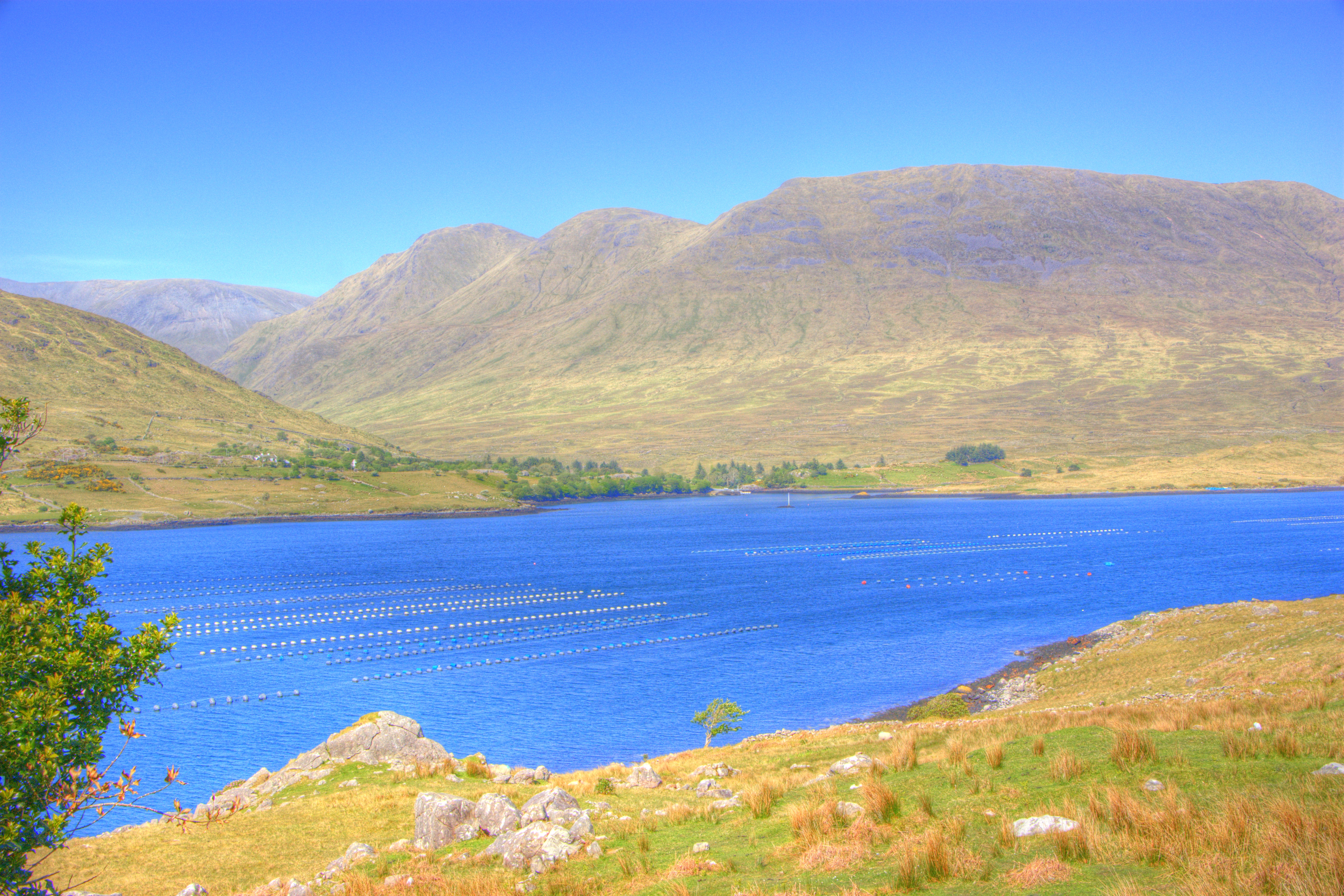
- Ben Gorm from the other side of Killary Harbour

Highest point
- Elevation: 700 m (2,300 ft)
- Prominence: 612 m (2,008 ft)
- Listing: P600, Marilyn, Hewitt
- Coordinates: 53.625°N 9.720°W

Geography
- Location within Ireland
- Location: County Mayo, Ireland
- OSI/OSNI grid: L861652

Ben Gorm (Irish: An Bhinn Ghorm, meaning 'the blue peak') is a mountain with a height of 700 metres (2,300 ft) on the north side of Killary Harbour in County Mayo, Ireland. The Ben Gorm mountains also includes two other peaks: Ben Creggan/Binn an Charragáin (693 m), and Maul Laur/Meall Láir or Ben Creggan South Top (687 m).

The Ben Gorm group overlooks Killary Harbour to the south, Fin Lough and Doo Lough to the west (which separate it from the Mweelrea Mountains), Glenummera to the north (which separate it from the Sheeffry Hills), and Glendavock to the east.

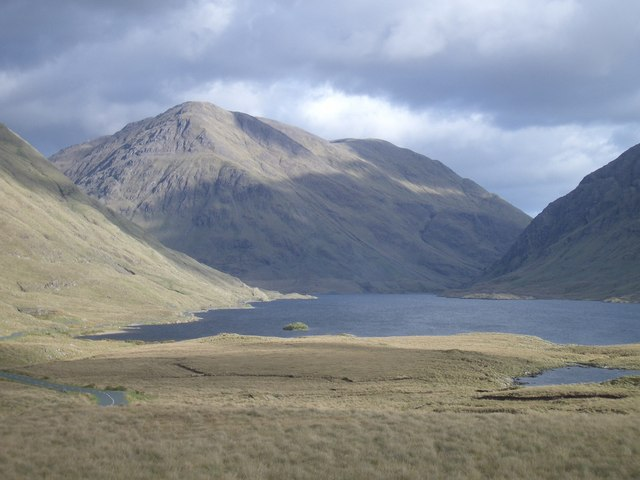
Doolough looking southeast towards Ben Creggan

== See also ==
Media related to Ben Gorm, County Mayo at Wikimedia Commons

- Lists of mountains in Ireland
- Lists of mountains and hills in the British Isles
- List of P600 mountains in the British Isles
- List of Marilyns in the British Isles
- List of Hewitt mountains in England, Wales and Ireland
