= Lists of mountains in Ireland =

Highest mountains in Ireland

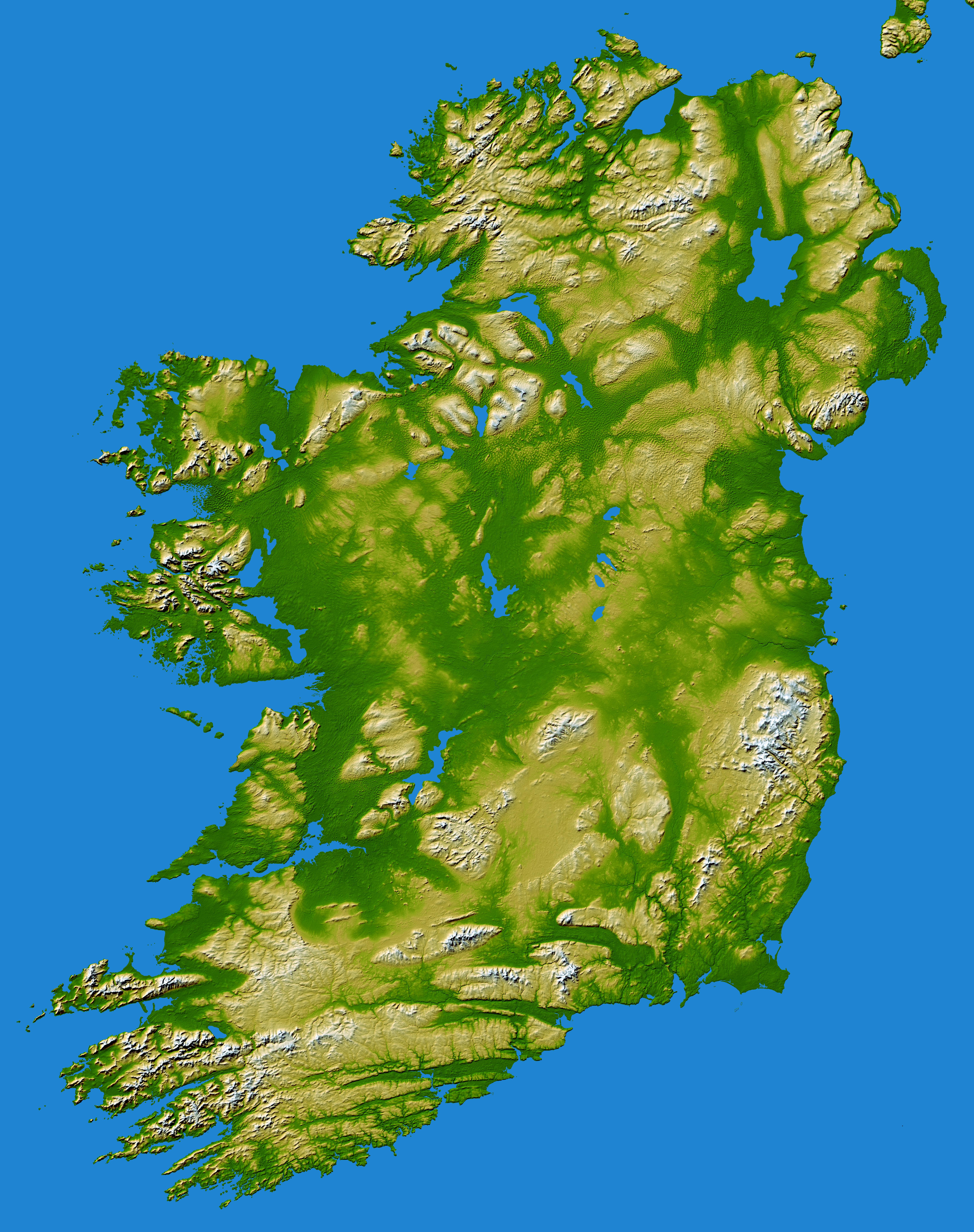
A topographic map of Ireland

In these lists of mountains in Ireland, those within Northern Ireland, or on the Republic of Ireland – United Kingdom border, are marked with an asterisk, while the rest are within the Republic of Ireland. Where mountains are ranked by height, the definition of the topographical prominence used to classify the mountain (e.g. the change in elevation required between neighbouring mountains), is noted. (Note: Some definitions use feet as their principal metric (e.g. Munros), others use metres (e.g. P600s, and Vandeleur-Lynams, and Arderins), and some use a mix of both (e.g. Hewitts and Real Munros).) In British definitions, a height of 600 metres (1,969 ft) is required for a mountain, whereas in Ireland, a lower threshold of 500 metres (1,640 ft) is sometimes advocated.

The lowest minimum prominence threshold of any definition of an Irish mountain is 15 metres (49 ft) (e.g. the Vandeleur-Lynam), however most definitions, including the International Climbing and Mountaineering Federation (UIAA) criteria, do not consider prominences below 30 metres (98 ft) as being mountains (e.g. must at least be an Arderin or a Hewitt). Many British definitions consider a peak with a prominence below 150 metres (492 ft), as being a top, and not a mountain (e.g. must be a Marilyn). A widely used definition of an Irish mountain requires a minimum prominence of 100 metres (328 ft) (e.g. a HuMP), and is the basis for the 100 Highest Irish Mountains.

While Irish mountains are ranked according to Irish classifications, they are also ranked on classifications that cover Great Britain and Ireland (e.g. Simms and P600s).

== Definitions ==
=== General concepts ===
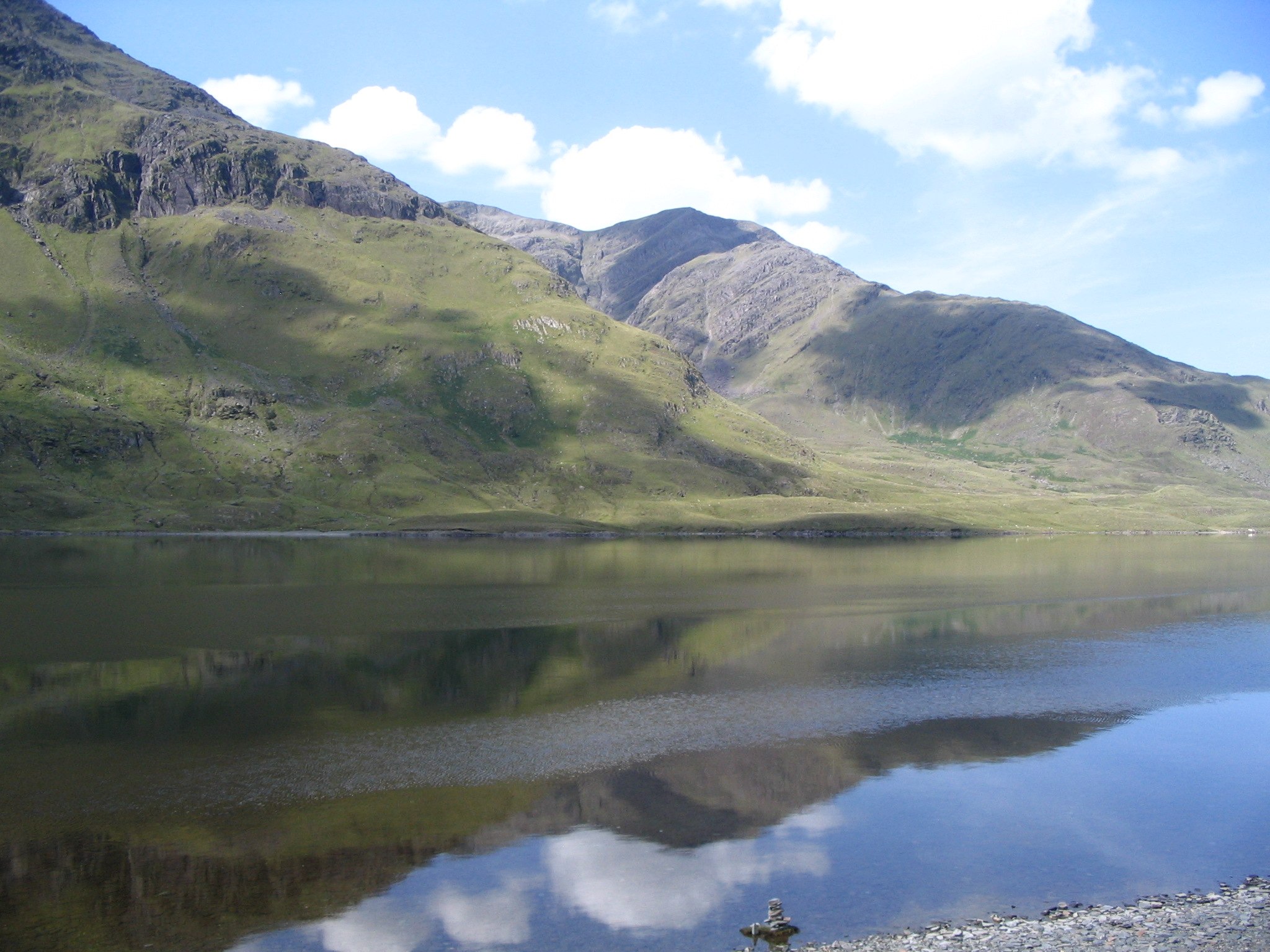
Mweelrea from Doo Lough in Connemara. Mweelrea is the provincial top of Connacht, the county top of Mayo, the 5th highest Irish P600 mountain, the 14th highest Irish Marilyn mountain, the 16th highest Irish MountainViews mountain, the 26th highest Irish Arderin/Hewitt mountain, and the 34th highest Irish Vandeleur-Lynam/Nuttall mountain. It is not a Furth (or Irish Munro), and therefore not a Real Munro.

There is no consensus on the definition of "mountain", but in Britain and Ireland it is often taken to be a summit over 2,000 ft, or more latterly, 600 m. There is less consensus about the topographical prominence requirement (e.g. the change in elevation required between neighbouring mountains), which can vary between 30–150 m (98–492 ft). Prominence is even strongly debated regarding UIAA classification of Himalayan mountains. In the alps, the UIAA requires a prominence of over 30 m to be a "peak" and over 300 m to be a "mountain".

The lowest threshold of prominence in Britain and Ireland is 15 metres (49 ft). The only definition in which prominence is not used, is where topographic isolation is used (e.g. the use of "sufficient separation" for Munros). Most Britain and Ireland definitions no longer categorise prominences below 30 metres (98 ft) (e.g. no new Nuttalls and Vandeleur-Lynams), and peaks with a prominence between 30–150 metres (98–492 ft) are now defined as tops rather than mountains (e.g. the 227 Munro Tops).

In Ireland, a prominence threshold of 100 metres (328 ft) is proposed for a mountain.

=== Main classifications ===
1. Furth. A Munro outside of Scotland with height over 3,000 feet (914 m); (Note: While there is no explicit prominence requirement, the Scottish Mountaineering Club ("SMC") reviews aspects like prominence, and isolation, when deciding on the official list of Munros. All of the SMC list of 34 Furths have a prominence over 30 m (98 ft), except for Caher West Top, which is 24 m (79 ft).) Ireland has 13 Furths, or "Irish Munros";
2. Real Munro. A Munro, or Furth, with prominence over 150 m (492 ft); Ireland has 5 Real Munros;
3. P600 (the "Majors"). British Isles peak of any height, with prominence over 600 m (1,969 ft); Ireland has 26 P600s; (Note: P600 an international classification of major peaks (along with the P1500, or Ultra-prominent peak), which was first applied by Alan Dawson (who called them "Majors"), and has become popular in the British Islands.)
4. Marilyn. British Isles peak of any height, with a prominence of over 150 m (492 ft); Ireland has 454 Marilyns;
5. Hewitt. England, Wales or Ireland peak over 2,000 ft (610 m), with prominence of over 30 m (98 ft); Ireland has 209 Hewitts;
6. Vandeleur-Lynam. (Note: The definition of an Irish Vandeleur-Lynam is similar to a "Nuttall" in England and Wales, except that the Vandeleur-Lynam is fully metric.) Irish peak over 600 m (1,969 ft), with prominence over 15 m (49 ft); Ireland has 274 Vandeleur-Lynams; (Note: A Vandeleur-Lynam is a hill in Ireland at least 600 metres high with a drop of at least 15 metres on all sides. In 1952 Joss Lynam produced a list of 2000ft summits with 50ft drop with assistance from Rev CRP Vandeleur. Joss Lynam updated a version of this list and published it in a reprint of "Mountaineering in Ireland" by Claude Wall printed in 1976. The metricised equivalent was published in 1997. Lynam was actively involved with the list until 2002, thereafter assisting MountainViews with subsequent revisions until his death in 2011.)
7. Arderin. (Note: The Arderin an Irish–equivalent of a "Hewitt", having the same metric prominence requirement of 30 m (98 ft), but the Arderin height requirement is lower, and metric, at 500 m (1,640 ft).) Irish peak over 500 m (1,640 ft), with a prominence of over 30 m (98 ft); Ireland has 409 Arderins; (Note: An Arderin is a hill in Ireland of 500m or over with a drop of at least 30m on all sides. This list was drawn up in 2002 by the MountainViews publisher [Simon Stewart] from an early listing of the Myrddyn Deweys with those hills from the Vandeleur-Lynams which meet the higher drop criterion. The actual list name, created in 2009, comes from the 527 m hill, Arderin, which is the County Top for both Laois and Offaly and means, from the Irish, "Height of Ireland".)
8. MountainViews. (Note: MountainView's classification is a popular modern standard for categorising mountains in the UK.) (Note: MountainViews was created in 2002 by Simon Stewart as a non–profit online database for climbers in Ireland to document and catalogue their Irish climbs. Its main data feed is taken from the Ordnance Survey Ireland ("OSI"), however, it also integrates other established Irish mountain databases such as the Paul Tempan Logainm Irish Placenames Database. Collins Press published its Online Datase in 2013 in the book: A Guide to Ireland's Mountain Summits: The Vandeleur-Lynams & the Arderins. MountainViews is also partnered with the important Database of British and Irish Hills ("DoBIH"), which is the main live database for the categorisation of mountains and hills in the British Isles.) Irish peak over 500 m (1,640 ft), with prominence over 100 m (328 ft); Ireland has 221 such mountains. (Note: MountainViews defines Irish peaks that meet this criterion as being "Irish mountains".)

=== Other classifications ===
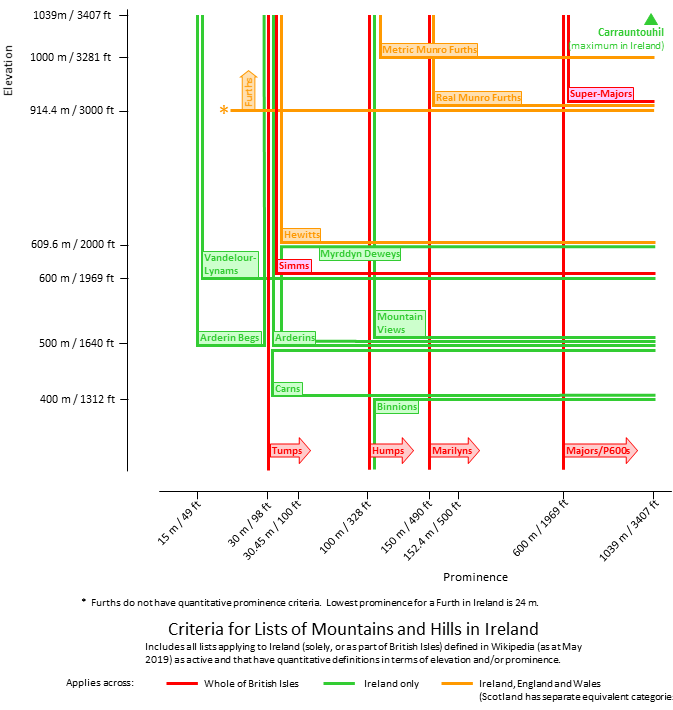
Elevation and prominence criteria used in mountain classification in Ireland (matching diagram for the whole British Isles is at Lists of mountains and hills in the British Isles).

The term Dillon is used to describe any of the 212 Irish summits in Paddy Dillon's well–regarded Irish 2010 climbing guidebook: "The Mountains of Ireland". All of Dillon's summits are over 2,000 ft (610 m), and almost all have a prominence above 30 m (98 ft) (i.e. they are very similar to the list of 209 Irish Hewitts).

The term Myrddyn Deweys are peaks in Ireland, between 500 metres to 2,000 feet (609.6 metres) in height, with a prominence above 30 metres (98 feet), which was published by Michael Dewey and Myrddyn Phillips in 2000. Myrddyn Deweys are the Irish equivalent of Deweys, which extend the Hewitt classification down to 500 metres. There are 200 Myrddyn Deweys.

=== MountainViews Online Database ===
MountainViews was created in 2002 by Simon Stewart as a non–profit online database for climbers in Ireland to document and catalogue their Irish climbs. Its main data source are from the Ordnance Survey Ireland (OSI) maps, although it also conducts its own surveys, which the OSI has integrated into its own database, and it also integrates other important Irish mountain databases such as the Paul Tempan's work with the Placenames Database of Ireland (Loganim). Collins Press published the MountainView Online Datase in 2013 in the book: A Guide to Ireland's Mountain Summits: The Vandeleur-Lynams & the Arderins.

Since 2012, MountainViews has been partnered with the Database of British and Irish Hills (DoBIH), which is the main live database for the categorisation of mountains and hills in Britain and Ireland. However, MountainViews can differ slightly from DoBIH on the measurements for certain Irish mountains. (Note: As of October 2018, the Irish MountainViews Online Database lists the prominence of Knockbrinnea (W) as 29m, and Carrignabinnia as 27 m, and thus they do not qualify as Irish Arderins, which means that MountainViews does not classify these two peaks as Hewitts or Simms; the total number of Irish Arderins over 2,000 ft is thus 207. The DoBIH however uses the Harvey Tables which list the prominence for both at 30 m, and thus the DoBIH class them as Irish Hewitts and Simms, giving 209 Irish Hewitts and 224 Irish Simms on the DoBIH tables.)

== List of the 10 Highest MacGillycuddy's Reeks ==
The MacGillycuddy's Reeks range contains Ireland's highest mountain, Carrauntoohil 1,038.6 m (3,407 ft), and the Reeks is the highest range of peaks in Ireland. However, many of its peaks do not meet all classification criteria for a "mountain" (e.g. particularly the 100–150 m (330–490 ft) in elevation change from neighbouring mountains), and many are not in the 100 Highest Irish Mountains. Regardless, the range contains ten of the thirteen Scottish Furths in Ireland, and given its importance, and as an important example of complexity of mountain classification, the ten highest Reeks are listed below:

The 10 highest peaks of the MacGillycuddy's Reeks, regardless of prominence (MountainViews Online Database, October 2018)
Rank	Irish name	Other names	Height	Prominence	Listed	Not Listed
1	Corrán Tuathail	Carrauntoohil	1,038.6 m (3,407 ft)	1,038.6 m (3,407 ft)	Real Munro, Furth, P600, Marilyn, Hewitt, Simm, Vandeleur-Lynam, Arderin, MountainViews	—
2	Binn Chaorach	Beenkeragh, Benkeeragh	1,008 m (3,307 ft)	92 m (302 ft)	Furth, Hewitt, Simm, Vandeleur-Lynam, Arderin	Real Munro, P600, Marilyn, MountainViews
3	Cathair na Féinne	Caher, Caher East Top	1,000 m (3,281 ft)	100 m (328 ft) (Note: Caher's official OSI prominence is 99.7 m, so it is not in the list of 100 Highest Irish Mountains)	Furth, Hewitt, Simm, Vandeleur-Lynam, Arderin	Real Munro, P600, Marilyn, MountainViews
4	Cnoc na Péiste	Knocknapeasta	988 m (3,241 ft)	253 m (830 ft)	Real Munro, Furth, Marilyn, Hewitt, Simm, Vandeleur-Lynam, Arderin, MountainViews	P600
5	Cathair Thiar	Caher West Top	973 m (3,192 ft)	25 m (82 ft)	Furth, Vandeleur-Lynam	Real Munro, P600, Marilyn, Hewitt, Simm, Arderin, MountainViews
6	Maolán Buí	—	973 m (3,192 ft)	38 m (125 ft)	Furth, Hewitt, Simm, Vandeleur-Lynam, Arderin	Real Munro, P600, Marilyn, MountainViews
7	Cnoc an Chuillinn	—	958 m (3,143 ft)	53 m (174 ft)	Furth, Hewitt, Simm, Vandeleur-Lynam, Arderin	Real Munro, P600, Marilyn, MountainViews
8	Na Cnámha	Carrauntoohil Tooth, The Bones, Knockoughter	957 m (3,140 ft)	37 m (121 ft)	Furth, Hewitt, Simm, Vandeleur-Lynam, Arderin	Real Munro, P600, Marilyn, MountainViews
9	An Gunna Mór	The Big Gun	939 m (3,081 ft)	74 m (243 ft)	Furth, Hewitt, Simm, Vandeleur-Lynam, Arderin	Real Munro, P600, Marilyn, MountainViews
10	Cruach Mhór	—	932 m (3,058 ft)	34 m (112 ft)	Furth, Hewitt, Simm, Vandeleur-Lynam, Arderin	Real Munro, P600, Marilyn, MountainViews

== 100 Highest Irish Mountains ==
(any height, prominence over 100 m)

This is the MountainViews 100 Highest Irish Mountains list, which was published by Collins Press in the 2013 book: A Guide to Ireland's Mountain Summits: The Vandeleur-Lynams & the Arderins. It combines Paul Tempan's 2012 research into Irish mountains and Irish mountain names. The list requires a prominence of over 100 m (328 ft), a compromise between the popular British Isles Marilyn criteria of 150 metres (see List of Marilyns in the British Isles for a ranking of Irish Marilyns by height and by prominence), and the Simms–Hewitt–Arderins criteria of 30 metres (see List of mountains of the British Isles by height for a ranking of Irish Simms by height and by prominence). It is a widely used list, and it contains 25 of the 26 Irish P600s (Slieve Snaght, a P600, did not make the 100 Highest).

Real Munro: Height over 3,000 feet (914 m), prominence over 150 metres (492 ft).
P600: Any height, prominence over 600 metres (1,969 ft).

The 100 Highest Irish Mountains (MountainViews Online Database, October 2018)
Rank	Name	Irish name	Translation (Note: In all cases this is the "Name Origin and Meaning" column from Paul Tempan's Irish Hill and Mountain Names (2010).)	Area/Range	Province	County	Height	Prom.	Rating (Note: The ratings are from the Mountainview Online Database of Irish climbs as at October 2018, as voted by members.)
1	Carrauntoohil; Highest in Munster	Corrán Tuathail	Tuathal's sickle	MacGillycuddy's Reeks	Munster	Kerry	1,038.6 m (3,407 ft)	1,038.6 m (3,407 ft)	82%
2	Knocknapeasta	Cnoc na Péiste	hill of the serpent	MacGillycuddy's Reeks	Munster	Kerry	988 m (3,241 ft)	253 m (830 ft)	94%
3	Brandon	Cnoc Bréanainn	Brendan's hill	Brandon Group	Munster	Kerry	952 m (3,123 ft)	934 m (3,064 ft)	86%
4	Lugnaquilla; Highest in Leinster	Log na Coille	hollow of the wood	Wicklow Mountains	Leinster	Wicklow	925 m (3,035 ft)	905 m (2,969 ft)	74%
5	Galtymore	Cnoc Mór na nGaibhlte	big hill of the Galtees	Galty Mountains	Munster	Limerick/Tipperary	918 m (3,012 ft)	898 m (2,946 ft)	80%
6	Baurtregaum	Barr Trí gCom	top of the three hollows	Slieve Mish	Munster	Kerry	851 m (2,792 ft)	643 m (2,110 ft)	85%
7	Slieve Donard*; Highest in Ulster	Sliabh Dónairt	peak (St.) Domhangart	Mourne Mountains	Ulster	Down	850 m (2,790 ft)	822 m (2,697 ft)	77%
8	Mullaghcleevaun	Mullach Cliabháin	summit of the cradle	Wicklow Mountains	Leinster	Wicklow	849 m (2,785 ft)	374 m (1,227 ft)	74%
9	Brandon Peak	Barr an Ghéaráin	top of the fang	Brandon Group	Munster	Kerry	840 m (2,760 ft)	190 m (620 ft)	92%
10	Mangerton	An Mhangarta	long–haired mountain	Mangerton Mountains	Munster	Kerry	838 m (2,749 ft)	583 m (1,913 ft)	79%
11	Caherconree	Cathair Conraoi	Cú Roí's fort	Slieve Mish	Munster	Kerry	835 m (2,740 ft)	129 m (423 ft)	88%
12	Purple Mountain	An Sliabh Corcra	purple mountain	Purple Mountain	Munster	Kerry	832 m (2,730 ft)	597 m (1,959 ft)	90%
13	Beenoskee	Binn os Gaoith	peak above the wind	Central Dingle	Munster	Kerry	826 m (2,710 ft)	491 m (1,611 ft)	91%
14	Lyracappul	Ladhar an Chapaill	fork of the horse	Galty Mountains	Munster	Limerick	825 m (2,707 ft)	100 m (330 ft)	90%
15	Tonelagee	Tóin le Gaoith	back to the wind	Wicklow Mountains	Leinster	Wicklow	817 m (2,680 ft)	202 m (663 ft)	80%
16	Mweelrea; Highest in Connacht	Maol Réidh	bald smooth top	Mweelrea Mountains	Connacht	Mayo	814 m (2,671 ft)	779 m (2,556 ft)	93%
17	Nephin	Néifinn	Fionn's paradise	North Mayo	Connacht	Mayo	806 m (2,644 ft)	778 m (2,552 ft)	82%
18	Ben Lugmore	Binn Log Mhór	peak of the big hollow	Mweelrea Mountains	Connacht	Mayo	803 m (2,635 ft)	158 m (518 ft)	95%
19	Greenane	An Grianán	sunny spot	Galty Mountains	Munster	Tipperary	801 m (2,628 ft)	157 m (515 ft)	73%
20	Mount Leinster	Stua Laighean	warrior of Leinster	Blackstairs Mountains	Leinster	Carlow/Wexford	794 m (2,605 ft)	706 m (2,316 ft)	75%
21	Knockmealdown	Cnoc Mhaoldomhnaigh	hill of Maoldomhnach	Knockmealdowns	Munster	Waterford	792 m (2,598 ft)	683 m (2,241 ft)	79%
22	Fauscoum	Fáschom	empty hollow	Comeragh Mountains	Munster	Waterford	792 m (2,598 ft)	626 m (2,054 ft)	83%
23	Stumpa Dúloigh	Stumpa Dúloigh	stump of the black lake	Dunkerron Mountains	Munster	Kerry	784 m (2,572 ft)	499 m (1,637 ft)	94%
24	Temple Hill	Cnoc an Teampaill	hill of the church	Galty Mountains	Munster	Limerick	783 m (2,569 ft)	188 m (617 ft)	87%
25	Mullaghanattin	Mullach an Aitinn	summit of the gorse	Dunkerron Mountains	Munster	Kerry	773 m (2,536 ft)	528 m (1,732 ft)	93%
26	Barrclashcame	Barr Chlais Céim	top of Clais Céim	Sheeffry Hills	Connacht	Mayo	772 m (2,533 ft)	707 m (2,320 ft)	89%
27	Coomacarrea	Com an Charria	hollow of the stag	Glenbeigh Horseshoe	Munster	Kerry	772 m (2,533 ft)	457 m (1,499 ft)	91%
28	Slieve Commedagh*	Sliabh Coimhéideach	guarding mountain	Mourne Mountains	Ulster	Down	767 m (2,516 ft)	180 m (590 ft)	82%
29	Croagh Patrick	Cruach Phádraig	(St.) Patrick's stack	Croagh Patrick	Connacht	Mayo	764 m (2,507 ft)	639 m (2,096 ft)	69%
30	Masatiompan	Más an Tiompáin	rump of the drum	Brandon Group	Munster	Kerry	762 m (2,500 ft)	109 m (358 ft)	92%
31	Camenabologue	Céim na mBulóg	pass of the bullocks	Wicklow Mountains	Leinster	Wicklow	758 m (2,487 ft)	133 m (436 ft)	71%
32	Kippure	Cipiúr	(unknown)	Wicklow Mountains	Leinster	Wicklow	757 m (2,484 ft)	262 m (860 ft)	57%
33	Knockanaffrin	Cnoc an Aifrinn	hill of the mass	Comeragh Mountains	Munster	Waterford	755 m (2,477 ft)	289 m (948 ft)	81%
34	Beann	An Bheann Bhán	white peak	Dunkerron Mountains	Munster	Kerry	752 m (2,467 ft)	166 m (545 ft)	87%
35	Errigal	An Earagail	(possibly) oratory	Derryveagh Mountains	Ulster	Donegal	751 m (2,464 ft)	688 m (2,257 ft)	79%
36	Slieve Binnian*	Sliabh Binneáin	mountain of small peak	Mourne Mountains	Ulster	Down	746 m (2,448 ft)	282 m (925 ft)	85%
37	Broaghnabinnia	Bruach na Binne	verge of the peak	Dunkerron Mountains	Munster	Kerry	745 m (2,444 ft)	290 m (950 ft)	96%
38	Slieve Bearnagh*	Sliabh Bearnach	gapped mountain	Mourne Mountains	Ulster	Down	739 m (2,425 ft)	304 m (997 ft)	89%
39	Conavalla	Ceann an Bhealaigh	head of the pass	Wicklow Mountains	Leinster	Wicklow	734 m (2,408 ft)	109 m (358 ft)	70%
40	Blackstairs Mountain	Na Staighrí Dubha	the blackstairs	Blackstairs Mountains	Leinster	Carlow/Wexford	732 m (2,402 ft)	540 m (1,770 ft)	83%
41	Benbaun	Binn Bhán	white peak	Twelve Bens	Connacht	Galway	729 m (2,392 ft)	684 m (2,244 ft)	90%
42	Djouce	Dioghais	fortified height	Wicklow Mountains	Leinster	Wicklow	725 m (2,379 ft)	200 m (660 ft)	59%
43	Slieve Carr	Corrshliabh	pointed mountain	Nephin Beg Range	Connacht	Mayo	721 m (2,365 ft)	646 m (2,119 ft)	90%
44	Slievenamon	Sliabh na mBan	mountain of the women	Slievenamon	Munster	Tipperary	720 m (2,360 ft)	711 m (2,333 ft)	64%
45	Gravale	Droibhéal	difficult passage	Wicklow Mountains	Leinster	Wicklow	718 m (2,356 ft)	123 m (404 ft)	71%
46	Corranabinnia	Coire na Binne	hollow of the peak	Nephin Beg Range	Connacht	Mayo	716 m (2,349 ft)	541 m (1,775 ft)	94%
47	Meenteog	Muing	boggy area long grass	Glenbeigh Horseshoe	Munster	Kerry	715 m (2,346 ft)	110 m (360 ft)	92%
48	Bencorr	Binn an Choire Mhóir	pointed peak	Twelve Bens	Connacht	Galway	711 m (2,333 ft)	306 m (1,004 ft)	95%
49	Knockboy	An Cnoc Buí	yellow/golden hill	Shehy/Knockboy	Munster	Cork/Kerry	706 m (2,316 ft)	685 m (2,247 ft)	75%
50	Moanbane	Móin Bhán	white bog	Wicklow Mountains	Leinster	Wicklow	703 m (2,306 ft)	108 m (354 ft)	67%
51	Slievelamagan*	Sliabh Lámhagáin	creeping mountain	Mourne Mountains	Ulster	Down	702 m (2,303 ft)	197 m (646 ft)	85%
52	Binn idir an Dá Log	Binn idir an Dá Log	peak between two hollows	Maumturks	Connacht	Galway	702 m (2,303 ft)	644 m (2,113 ft)	93%
53	Slieve Meelbeg*	Sliabh Míol Beag	mountain of ants	Mourne Mountains	Ulster	Down	702 m (2,303 ft)	193 m (633 ft)	77%
54	Ben Gorm	An Bhinn Ghorm	the blue peak	Ben Gorm Mountains	Connacht	Mayo	700 m (2,300 ft)	670 m (2,200 ft)	93%
55	Birreencorragh	Birín Corrach	rocky little spike	Nephin Beg Range	Connacht	Mayo	698 m (2,290 ft)	583 m (1,913 ft)	90%
56	Bencollaghduff	Binn Dubh	black peak	Twelve Bens	Connacht	Galway	696 m (2,283 ft)	191 m (627 ft)	97%
57	The Paps East	Dá Chích Anann Thoir	the two breasts	Paps/Derrynasaggart	Munster	Kerry	694 m (2,277 ft)	623 m (2,044 ft)	83%
58	Keeper Hill	Sliabh Coimeálta	mountain of guarding	Silvermine Mountains	Munster	Tipperary	694 m (2,277 ft)	627 m (2,057 ft)	66%
59	Caoinkeen	An Caincín	snub/turned-up nose	Shehy/Knockboy	Munster	Cork/Kerry	692 m (2,270 ft)	107 m (351 ft)	88%
60	Benbreen	Binn Bhraoin	Braon's peak	Twelve Bens	Connacht	Galway	691 m (2,267 ft)	186 m (610 ft)	95%
61	Knocknadobar	Cnoc na dTobar	hill of the wells	Iveragh Peninsula	Munster	Kerry	690 m (2,260 ft)	585 m (1,919 ft)	83%
62	The Paps West	Dá Chích Anann Thiar	the two breasts	Paps/Derrynasaggart	Munster	Kerry	690 m (2,260 ft)	106 m (348 ft)	89%
63	Croaghaun	Cruachán	little stack	Achill	Connacht	Mayo	688 m (2,257 ft)	688 m (2,257 ft)	95%
64	Hungry Hill	Cnoc Daod	hill of the tooth	Caha Mountains	Munster	Cork	685 m (2,247 ft)	400 m (1,300 ft)	90%
65	Knockmoyle	Cnoc Maol	bald or round hill	Dunkerron Mountains	Munster	Kerry	684 m (2,244 ft)	169 m (554 ft)	82%
66	Maumtrasna	Mám Trasna	pass across	Partry/Joyce Country	Connacht	Mayo	682 m (2,238 ft)	607 m (1,991 ft)	85%
67	Caherbarnagh	An Chathair Bhearnach	the gapped fort	Paps/Derrynasaggart	Munster	Cork	681 m (2,234 ft)	361 m (1,184 ft)	74%
68	Slieve Meelmore*	Sliabh Míol Mór	mountain of ants	Mourne Mountains	Ulster	Down	680 m (2,230 ft)	109 m (358 ft)	78%
69	Colly Mountain	An Bheann Mhór	the big peak	Glenbeigh Horseshoe	Munster	Kerry	679 m (2,228 ft)	144 m (472 ft)	84%
70	Sawel*	Samhail Phite Méabha	resemblance of Maeve's vulva	Sperrin Mountains	Ulster	Londonderry/Tyrone	678 m (2,224 ft)	657 m (2,156 ft)	83%
71	Slieve Snaght	Sliabh Sneachta	mountain of snow	Derryveagh Mountains	Ulster	Donegal	678 m (2,224 ft)	403 m (1,322 ft)	91%
72	Derryclare	Binn Doire Chláir	the peak of Derryclare	Twelve Bens	Connacht	Galway	677 m (2,221 ft)	129 m (423 ft)	91%
73	Knocknagantee	Cnoc na gCainte	hill of the conversation	Dunkerron Mountains	Munster	Kerry	676 m (2,218 ft)	101 m (331 ft)	88%
74	An Bheann Mhór	An Bheann Mhór	the big peak	Dunkerron Mountains	Munster	Kerry	675 m (2,215 ft)	290 m (950 ft)	87%
75	Croaghgorm	An Chruach Ghorm	the blue stack	Bluestack Mountains	Ulster	Donegal	674 m (2,211 ft)	541 m (1,775 ft)	91%
76	Slievemore	An Sliabh Mór	the big mountain	Achill	Connacht	Mayo	671 m (2,201 ft)	582 m (1,909 ft)	87%
77	Lavagh More	An Leamhach Mhór	the big place of elms	Bluestack Mountains	Ulster	Donegal	671 m (2,201 ft)	193 m (633 ft)	94%
78	Slievanea NE Top	Sliabh Macha Ré	the smooth plain	Central Dingle	Munster	Kerry	671 m (2,201 ft)	265 m (869 ft)	87%
79	Slieve Muck*	Sliabh Muc	mountain of the pigs	Mourne Mountains	Ulster	Down	670 m (2,200 ft)	155 m (509 ft)	83%
80	Muckish	An Mhucais	the pig's back/or ridge	Derryveagh Mountains	Ulster	Donegal	667 m (2,188 ft)	523 m (1,716 ft)	83%
81	Finnararagh	An Corrán	the crescent or sickle	Dunkerron Mountains	Munster	Kerry	667 m (2,188 ft)	142 m (466 ft)	92%
82	Letterbreckaun	Binn Bhriocáin	(St.) Brecan's peak	Maumturks	Connacht	Galway	667 m (2,188 ft)	322 m (1,056 ft)	92%
83	Knocknafallia	Cnoc na Faille	hill of the cliff	Knockmealdowns	Munster	Waterford	667 m (2,188 ft)	153 m (502 ft)	80%
84	Coomura Mountain	Cnoc na Faille	(unknown)	Dunkerron Mountains	Munster	Kerry	666 m (2,185 ft)	209 m (686 ft)	94%
85	Cuilcagh	Binn Chuilceach	cloaked peak	Cuilcagh Mountains	Ulster	Cavan/Fermanagh	665 m (2,182 ft)	570 m (1,870 ft)	80%
86	Bengower	Binn Gabhar	goats peak	Twelve Bens	Connacht	Galway	664 m (2,178 ft)	196 m (643 ft)	90%
87	Croaghanmoira	Cruachán Mhaigh Rath	little stack of Moira	Wicklow Mountains	Leinster	Wicklow	664 m (2,178 ft)	209 m (686 ft)	74%
88	Sugarloaf Hill	Cnoc na gCloch	hill of the stones	Knockmealdowns	Munster	Tipperary/Waterford	663 m (2,175 ft)	118 m (387 ft)	71%
89	Binn Mhór	Binn Mhór	big peak	Maumturks	Connacht	Galway	661 m (2,169 ft)	406 m (1,332 ft)	86%
90	Mullacor	Mullach Mhór	big summit	Wicklow Mountains	Leinster	Wicklow	661 m (2,169 ft)	102 m (335 ft)	62%
91	Beenmore	Binn Mhór	big peak	Glenbeigh Horseshoe	Munster	Kerry	660 m (2,170 ft)	125 m (410 ft)	89%
92	Knockowen	Cnoc Eoghain	hill of Eoghan	Caha Mountains	Munster	Cork/Kerry	658 m (2,159 ft)	373 m (1,224 ft)	89%
93	Chimney Rock Mtn*	Sliabh an Aoire	Shepherd mountain	Mourne Mountains	Ulster	Down	656 m (2,152 ft)	131 m (430 ft)	86%
94	Muckanaght	Meacanacht	Pig's back	Twelve Bens	Connacht	Galway	654 m (2,146 ft)	179 m (587 ft)	92%
95	Keadeen Mountain	Céidín	Flat–topped hill	Wicklow Mountains	Leinster	Wicklow	653 m (2,142 ft)	334 m (1,096 ft)	80%
96	Knockshanahullion	Cnoc Seanchuillinn	hill of the old holly	Knockmealdowns	Munster	Tipperary	652 m (2,139 ft)	317 m (1,040 ft)	70%
97	Dooish Mountain	An Dubhais	the black ridge	Derryveagh Mountains	Ulster	Donegal	652 m (2,139 ft)	377 m (1,237 ft)	90%
98	Crohane	An Cruachán	the little stack	Mangerton Mountains	Munster	Kerry	650 m (2,130 ft)	385 m (1,263 ft)	83%
99	Mullaghanish	Mullach an Ois	summit of the deer	Paps/Derrynasaggart	Munster	Cork/Kerry	649 m (2,129 ft)	264 m (866 ft)	48%
100	Coomcallee	Com Caillí	the hollow of the hag	Dunkerron Mountains	Munster	Kerry	649 m (2,129 ft)	104 m (341 ft)	84%

== List of 409 Irish Arderins ==
(height above 500 m, prominence over 30 m)

A noted definition of an Irish mountain over the lower height threshold of 500 m (1,640 ft), is the Arderins list, but which meets the minimum requirement for a "mountain" with a prominence above 30 m (98 ft), and is an Irish equivalent of the Hewitt (the 207 Arderins over 2,000 ft (610 m) are the 207–209 Irish Hewitts), or the Simm (the 222 Arderins over 600 m (1,969 ft) are the 222–224 Irish Simms). The 199 Arderins below 2,000 ft (610 m) are the Myrddyn Deweys (e.g. the total of the 207 Irish Hewitts and the 199 Myrddyn Deweys equal the 406 Irish Arderins).

MountainView's Online Database of Arderins was published by Collins Press in the 2013 book: A Guide to Ireland's Mountain Summits: The Vandeleur-Lynams & the Arderins, and updated in 2015. In 2023, the MountainView Online Database listed 409 Irish mountains as meeting the Arderin definition. Several of the MountainViews.ie users have recorded completing the entire list of Arderins. One user having completed the Arderins within one single year (2014) along with the complete list of Vandeleur-Lynams, county highpoints and the highest 100 list.

MountainViews uses the term Arderin Begs for the additional class of peaks over 500 m (1,640 ft) in height, and with a prominence between 15–30 m (49–98 ft). In 2018, Ireland had 124 Arderin Begs.

Irish Arderins (MountainViews Online Database, October 2018)
Height Rank	Prom. Rank	Name	Range/Area	Province	County	Height (m)	Prom. (m)	Height (ft)	Prom. (ft)	Isolation (Note: This is not topographic isolation, but is the distance to the nearest mountain of any height, but with a minimum prominence of 15 metres (49 ft), as per the Irish MountainViews Online Database) (m)	Topo Map	OSI/OSNI Grid
1	1	Carrauntoohil	MacGillycuddy's Reeks	Munster	Kerry	1,039	1,039	3,407	3,407	400	78	V804 844
2	242	Beenkeragh	MacGillycuddy's Reeks	Munster	Kerry	1,008	91	3,308	298	600	78	V801 852
3	223	Caher	MacGillycuddy's Reeks	Munster	Kerry	1,000	100	3,281	327	300	78	V793 839
4	109	Cnoc na Péiste	MacGillycuddy's Reeks	Munster	Kerry	988	253	3,241	830	500	78	V836 842
5	369	Maolán Buí	MacGillycuddy's Reeks	Munster	Kerry	973	38	3,192	125	500	78	V832 838
6	322	Cnoc an Chuillinn	MacGillycuddy's Reeks	Munster	Kerry	958	53	3,143	174	500	78	V823 833
7	372	Na Cnámha	MacGillycuddy's Reeks	Munster	Kerry	957	37	3,138	122	400	78	V801 847
8	2	Brandon	Brandon Group	Munster	Kerry	952	934	3,122	3,064	600	70	Q460 116
9	268	The Big Gun	MacGillycuddy's Reeks	Munster	Kerry	939	74	3,081	243	300	78	V840 845
10	393	Cruach Mhór	MacGillycuddy's Reeks	Munster	Kerry	932	34	3,058	112	300	78	V841 848
11	3	Lugnaquilla	Wicklow Mountains	Leinster	Wicklow	925	905	3,035	2,969	1,700	56	T032 917
12	4	Galtymore	Galty Mountains	Munster	Limerick/ Tipperary	918	898	3,011	2,946	1,000	74	R878 238
13	20	Baurtregaum	Slieve Mish	Munster	Kerry	851	643	2,792	2,110	700	71	Q749 076
14	5	Slieve Donard	Mourne Mountains	Ulster	Down	850	822	2,789	2,697	1,000	29	J357 277
15	71	Mullaghcleevaun	Wicklow Mountains	Leinster	Wicklow	849	374	2,785	1,227	1,500	56	O068 070
16	329	Skregmore	MacGillycuddy's Reeks	Munster	Kerry	848	50	2,781	164	500	78	V792 860
17	258	Cnoc na Toinne	MacGillycuddy's Reeks	Munster	Kerry	845	80	2,772	262	1,200	78	V811 833
18	135	Brandon Peak	Brandon Group	Munster	Kerry	840	190	2,756	623	800	70	Q472 095
19	28	Mangerton	Mangerton Mountains	Munster	Kerry	838	583	2,750	1,913	1,200	78	V980 808
20	182	Caherconree	Slieve Mish	Munster	Kerry	835	129	2,740	423	900	71	Q733 073
21	27	Purple Mountain	Purple Mountain	Munster	Kerry	832	597	2,730	1,959	1,000	78	V887 852
22	46	Beenoskee	Central Dingle	Munster	Kerry	826	491	2,710	1,611	700	70	Q580 089
23	221	Lyracappul	Galty Mountains	Munster	Limerick	825	100	2,708	328	700	74	R845 232
24	311	Benagh	Brandon Group	Munster	Kerry	822	57	2,697	187	500	70	Q469 119
25	128	Tonelagee	Wicklow Mountains	Leinster	Wicklow	817	202	2,680	663	1,100	56	O085 016
26	6	Mweelrea	Mweelrea Mountains	Connacht	Mayo	814	779	2,671	2,556	1,500	37	L789 668
27	345	Faha Ridge	Brandon Group	Munster	Kerry	809	44	2,654	144	500	70	Q464 120
28	7	Nephin	North Mayo	Connacht	Mayo	806	778	2,644	2,552	3,400	23/31	G103 079
29	151	Ben Lugmore	Mweelrea Mountains	Connacht	Mayo	803	158	2,635	518	400	37	L812 674
30	152	Greenane	Galty Mountains	Munster	Tipperary	801	157	2,629	515	1,300	74	R925 239
31	257	Galtybeg	Galty Mountains	Munster	Tipperary	799	80	2,622	263	1,200	74	R890 241
32	362	Stradbally Mountain	Central Dingle	Munster	Kerry	798	40	2,618	131	700	70	Q587 092
33	301	Ben Bury	Mweelrea Mountains	Connacht	Mayo	795	60	2,608	197	700	37	L803 683
34	10	Mount Leinster	Blackstairs Mountains	Leinster	Carlow/ Wexford	794	706	2,606	2,318	1,800	68	S827 525
35	331	Corrigasleggaun	Wicklow Mountains	Leinster	Wicklow	794	49	2,605	161	1,300	56	T047 910
36	15	Knockmealdown	Knockmealdown Mountains	Munster	Tipperary/ Waterford	792	683	2,600	2,240	900	74	S058 084
37	23	Fauscoum	Comeragh Mountains	Munster	Waterford	792	626	2,598	2,054	1,000	75	S316 105
38	335	Ben Lugmore West Top	Mweelrea Mountains	Connacht	Mayo	790	47	2,592	154	700	37	L806 677
39	373	Ben Lugmore East Top	Mweelrea Mountains	Connacht	Mayo	790	37	2,592	121	400	37	L815 672
40	340	Mullaghcleevaun East Top	Wicklow Mountains	Leinster	Wicklow	790	45	2,592	148	1,500	56	O082 067
41	364	Greenane West	Galty Mountains	Munster	Tipperary	787	39	2,582	129	1,300	74	R910 239
42	44	Stumpa Dúloigh	Dunkerron Mountains	Munster	Kerry	784	499	2,572	1,637	400	78	V787 794
43	136	Temple Hill	Galty Mountains	Munster	Limerick	783	188	2,569	617	1,100	74	R833 218
44	284	Mangerton North Top	Mangerton Mountains	Munster	Kerry	782	67	2,566	220	600	78	V984 818
45	39	Mullaghanattin	Dunkerron Mountains	Munster	Kerry	773	528	2,536	1,732	800	78	V739 773
46	52	Coomacarrea	Glenbeigh Horseshoe	Munster	Kerry	772	457	2,533	1,499	1,100	78/83	V611 825
47	9	Barrclashcame	Sheeffry Hills	Connacht	Mayo	772	707	2,533	2,320	1,200	37	L849 695
48	386	Knockmoylan	Knockmealdown Mountains	Munster	Tipperary	767	35	2,517	115	900	74	S058 093
49	140	Slieve Commedagh	Mourne Mountains	Ulster	Down	767	180	2,516	591	900	29	J346 286
50	21	Croagh Patrick	Croagh Patrick	Connacht	Mayo	764	639	2,507	2,096	900	30	L906 802
51	336	Shehy Mountain	Purple Mountain	Munster	Kerry	762	47	2,500	154	800	78	V902 857
52	374	Tievummera	Sheeffry Hills	Connacht	Mayo	762	37	2,500	121	1,200	37	L862 695
53	202	Masatiompan	Brandon Group	Munster	Kerry	762	109	2,500	358	700	70	Q465 145
54	317	Slievemaan	Wicklow Mountains	Leinster	Wicklow	759	54	2,490	177	1,500	56	T018 908
55	177	Camenabologue	Wicklow Mountains	Leinster	Wicklow	758	133	2,487	436	1,400	56	T023 959
56	108	Kippure	Dublin Mountains	Leinster	Dublin/ Wicklow	757	262	2,484	860	3,300	56	O116 154
57	387	Purple Mountain NE Top	Purple Mountain	Munster	Kerry	757	35	2,484	115	800	78	V894 858
58	95	Knockanaffrin	Comeragh Mountains	Munster	Waterford	755	289	2,477	948	1,100	75	S285 154
59	149	Beann	Dunkerron Mountains	Munster	Kerry	752	166	2,467	545	800	78	V726 765
60	11	Errigal	Derryveagh Mountains	Ulster	Donegal	751	688	2,464	2,257	1,400	1	B928 207
61	347	Cnoc Íochtair	MacGillycuddy's Reeks	Munster	Kerry	746	44	2,448	144	700	78	V785 860
62	98	Slieve Binnian	Mourne Mountains	Ulster	Down	746	282	2,447	925	600	29	J321 233
63	396	Piaras Mór	Brandon Group	Munster	Kerry	746	33	2,447	108	200	70	Q464 136
64	92	Broaghnabinnia	Dunkerron Mountains	Munster	Kerry	745	290	2,444	951	2,200	78	V801 814
65	375	Tievnabinnia	Sheeffry Hills	Connacht	Mayo	742	37	2,434	121	1,600	37	L881 706
66	282	Coumfea	Comeragh Mountains	Munster	Waterford	742	69	2,434	226	1,000	75	S295 097
67	87	Slieve Bearnagh	Mourne Mountains	Ulster	Down	739	304	2,425	997	400	29	J313 281
68	302	Tomies Mountain	Purple Mountain	Munster	Kerry	735	60	2,411	197	700	78	V895 868
69	203	Conavalla	Wicklow Mountains	Leinster	Wicklow	734	109	2,408	358	1,800	56	T039 972
70	38	Blackstairs Mountain	Blackstairs Mountains	Leinster	Carlow/ Wexford	732	540	2,402	1,772	1,900	68	S810 448
71	229	Cnoc an Bhráca	MacGillycuddy's Reeks	Munster	Kerry	731	96	2,398	315	600	78	V858 854
72	14	Binn Bhán	Twelve Bens	Connacht	Galway	729	684	2,392	2,244	900	37	L786 539
73	275	Seefin	Comeragh Mountains	Munster	Waterford	726	71	2,382	233	2,700	75	S274 068
74	129	Djouce	Wicklow Mountains	Leinster	Wicklow	725	200	2,379	656	1,400	56	O179 103
75	226	Seefingan	Dublin Mountains	Leinster	Dublin/ Wicklow	723	98	2,372	321	1,500	56	O087 170
76	18	Slieve Carr	Nephin Beg Range	Connacht	Mayo	721	646	2,365	2,119	2,500	23	F915 145
77	8	Slievenamon	Slievenamon	Munster	Tipperary	720	711	2,363	2,333	1,100	67	S297 307
78	289	Duff Hill	Wicklow Mountains	Leinster	Wicklow	720	65	2,362	213	1,600	56	O094 083
79	191	Gravale	Wicklow Mountains	Leinster	Wicklow	718	123	2,356	404	1,600	56	O105 094
80	35	Corranabinnia	Nephin Beg Range	Connacht	Mayo	716	541	2,349	1,775	800	30	F903 032
81	199	Meenteog	Glenbeigh Horseshoe	Munster	Kerry	715	110	2,346	361	1,200	78/83	V638 826
82	86	Binn Chorr	Twelve Bens	Connacht	Galway	711	306	2,333	1,004	300	37	L812 522
83	13	Knockboy	Shehy Mountains	Munster	Cork/ Kerry	706	685	2,316	2,247	600	85	W005 620
84	243	Stoompa	Mangerton Mountains	Munster	Kerry	705	90	2,313	295	1,100	79	W006 817
85	207	Moanbane	Wicklow Mountains	Leinster	Wicklow	703	108	2,306	354	1,600	56	O034 068
86	130	Slievelamagan	Mourne Mountains	Ulster	Down	702	197	2,304	647	1,300	29	J329 260
87	19	Binn idir an Dá Log	Maamturks	Connacht	Galway	702	644	2,303	2,113	600	37	L888 528
88	132	Slieve Meelbeg	Mourne Mountains	Ulster	Down	702	193	2,303	633	800	29	J301 279
89	16	Ben Gorm	Ben Gorm Mountains	Connacht	Mayo	700	670	2,297	2,198	1,000	37	L862 653
90	276	Camaderry Mountain	Wicklow Mountains	Leinster	Wicklow	699	71	2,292	233	1,100	56	T081 980
91	29	Birreencorragh	Nephin Beg Range	Connacht	Mayo	698	583	2,290	1,913	1,000	23/31	G025 050
92	349	Silsean	Wicklow Mountains	Leinster	Wicklow	698	43	2,290	141	1,600	56	O023 056
93	134	Bencollaghduff	Twelve Bens	Connacht	Galway	696	191	2,283	627	1,300	37	L798 530
94	24	The Paps East	Derrynasaggart Mountains	Munster	Kerry	694	623	2,277	2,044	800	79	W134 855
95	22	Keeper Hill	Keeper Hill	Munster	Tipperary	694	627	2,277	2,057	2,100	59	R823 664
96	247	Ben Creggan	Ben Gorm Mountains	Connacht	Mayo	693	88	2,274	289	500	37	L857 666
97	376	Beann NE Top	Dunkerron Mountains	Munster	Kerry	692	37	2,270	121	800	78	V730 771
98	209	Caoinkeen	Shehy Mountains	Munster	Cork/ Kerry	692	107	2,270	351	1,900	85	W010 646
99	326	Knockaterriff	Galty Mountains	Munster	Limerick	692	51	2,269	168	700	74	R848 216
100	138	Binn Bhraoin	Twelve Bens	Connacht	Galway	691	186	2,267	610	500	37	L783 515
101	210	The Paps West	Derrynasaggart Mountains	Munster	Kerry	690	106	2,264	348	800	79	W125 855
102	32	Knocknadobar	Iveragh NW	Munster	Kerry	690	565	2,264	1,854	1,100	83	V506 845
103	12	Croaghaun	Achill	Connacht	Mayo	688	688	2,257	2,257	700	22/30	F559 061
104	273	Ben Creggan South Top	Ben Gorm Mountains	Connacht	Mayo	687	72	2,254	236	500	37	L858 661
105	296	Corranabinnia SW Top	Nephin Beg Range	Connacht	Mayo	687	62	2,254	203	800	30	F897 026
106	277	War Hill	Wicklow Mountains	Leinster	Wicklow	686	71	2,251	233	1,400	56	O169 113
107	63	Hungry Hill	Caha Mountains	Munster	Cork	685	400	2,247	1,312	1,800	84	V761 497
108	148	Knockmoyle	Dunkerron Mountains	Munster	Kerry	684	169	2,244	554	1,200	78/83	V665 749
109	318	Tomaneena	Wicklow Mountains	Leinster	Wicklow	682	54	2,239	177	1,900	56	T063 982
110	25	Maumtrasna	Partry Mountains	Connacht	Mayo	682	607	2,238	1,991	1,800	38	L961 637
111	285	Carrigvore	Wicklow Mountains	Leinster	Wicklow	682	67	2,238	220	1,900	56	O123 102
112	76	Caherbarnagh	Derrynasaggart Mountains	Munster	Cork	681	361	2,234	1,184	600	79	W192 871
113	204	Slieve Meelmore	Mourne Mountains	Ulster	Down	680	109	2,231	358	800	29	J306 287
114	167	Colly	Glenbeigh Horseshoe	Munster	Kerry	679	144	2,228	472	1,100	78/83	V650 807
115	323	Knocksheegowna	Comeragh Mountains	Munster	Waterford	678	53	2,224	174	1,500	75	S277 165
116	62	Slieve Snaght	Derryveagh Mountains	Ulster	Donegal	678	403	2,224	1,322	900	1	B924 148
117	324	Slieve Binnian North Top	Mourne Mountains	Ulster	Down	678	53	2,224	174	300	29	J317 245
118	17	Sawel	Sperrin Mountains	Ulster	Londonderry/ Tyrone	678	657	2,224	2,156	1,800	13	H618 973
119	183	Binn Doire Chláir	Twelve Bens	Connacht	Galway	677	129	2,221	423	1,200	37	L815 510
120	219	Knocknagantee	Dunkerron Mountains	Munster	Kerry	676	101	2,218	331	1,200	78/83	V668 729
121	94	An Bheann Mhór	Dunkerron Mountains	Munster	Kerry	675	290	2,214	950	500	83	V594 683
122	36	Croaghgorm	Bluestack Mountains	Ulster	Donegal	674	541	2,211	1,775	1,000	11	G948 896
123	30	Slievemore	Achill	Connacht	Mayo	671	582	2,201	1,909	3,200	22/30	F650 086
124	133	Lavagh More	Bluestack Mountains	Ulster	Donegal	671	193	2,201	633	1,100	11	G935 910
125	104	Slievanea NE Top	Central Dingle	Munster	Kerry	671	265	2,200	869	1,000	70	Q515 064
126	154	Slieve Muck	Mourne Mountains	Ulster	Down	670	155	2,199	510	1,200	29	J281 250
127	40	Muckish	Derryveagh Mountains	Ulster	Donegal	667	523	2,189	1,716	3,200	2	C004 287
128	168	An Corrán	Dunkerron Mountains	Munster	Kerry	667	142	2,188	466	900	78	V697 737
129	81	Binn Bhriocáin	Maamturks	Connacht	Galway	667	322	2,188	1,056	600	37	L856 551
130	159	Knocknafallia	Knockmealdown Mountains	Munster	Waterford	667	153	2,187	502	1,200	74	S090 075
131	197	Coomura Mountain	Dunkerron Mountains	Munster	Kerry	666	111	2,185	364	1,200	78/83	V677 752
132	31	Cuilcagh	Breifne Mountains	Ulster	Cavan/ Fermanagh	665	570	2,182	1,870	2,600	26	H123 281
133	244	Mullaghnarakill	Glenbeigh Horseshoe	Munster	Kerry	665	90	2,182	295	1,200	78/83	V601 850
134	365	Croaghaun SW Top	Achill	Connacht	Mayo	664	39	2,178	128	700	22/30	F554 058
135	131	Binn Gabhar	Twelve Bens	Connacht	Galway	664	196	2,178	643	900	37	L783 507
136	124	Croaghanmoira	Wicklow Mountains	Leinster	Wicklow	664	209	2,178	686	1,000	62	T099 865
137	309	Stumpa Dúloigh SW Top	Dunkerron Mountains	Munster	Kerry	663	58	2,175	190	1,000	78	V778 789
138	370	Camenabologue SE Top	Wicklow Mountains	Leinster	Wicklow	663	38	2,175	125	1,200	56	T037 954
139	194	Sugarloaf Hill	Knockmealdown Mountains	Munster	Tipperary/ Waterford	663	118	2,174	386	2,100	74	S040 105
140	60	Binn Mhór	Maamturks	Connacht	Galway	661	406	2,169	1,332	700	44	L918 494
141	217	Mullacor	Wicklow Mountains	Leinster	Wicklow	661	102	2,169	335	1,600	56	T092 939
142	190	Beenmore	Glenbeigh Horseshoe	Munster	Kerry	660	125	2,165	410	1,200	83	V596 867
143	402	Binn idir an Dá Log SE Top	Maamturks	Connacht	Galway	659	31	2,162	102	600	37	L894 526
144	72	Knockowen	Caha Mountains	Munster	Cork/ Kerry	658	373	2,159	1,224	1,400	84	V809 554
145	274	Beann SW Top	Dunkerron Mountains	Munster	Kerry	657	72	2,156	236	800	78	V718 760
146	397	Mount Leinster East Top	Blackstairs Mountains	Leinster	Wexford	657	32	2,154	106	1,800	68	S844 528
147	178	Chimney Rock Mountain	Mourne Mountains	Ulster	Down	656	131	2,152	430	1,400	29	J364 257
148	300	Knocknagnauv	Knockmealdown Mountains	Munster	Tipperary/ Waterford	655	60	2,149	197	1,500	74	S081 083
149	303	Cnoc na dTarbh	MacGillycuddy's Reeks	Munster	Kerry	655	60	2,149	197	600	78	V862 850
150	224	Cove Mountain	Mourne Mountains	Ulster	Down	655	100	2,148	327	600	29	J337 271
151	141	Muckanaght	Twelve Bens	Connacht	Galway	654	179	2,146	587	1,000	37	L767 541
152	78	Keadeen Mountain	Wicklow Mountains	Leinster	Wicklow	653	334	2,142	1,096	1,400	62	S954 897
153	82	Knockshanahullion	Knockmealdown Mountains	Munster	Tipperary	652	317	2,139	1,040	2,000	74	R999 104
154	227	Lugduff	Wicklow Mountains	Leinster	Wicklow	652	97	2,139	318	1,000	56	T072 953
155	69	Dooish	Derryveagh Mountains	Ulster	Donegal	652	377	2,137	1,235	800	6	B982 210
156	337	Been Hill	Glenbeigh Horseshoe	Munster	Kerry	651	46	2,136	151	1,200	83	V590 854
157	235	Lavagh Beg	Bluestack Mountains	Ulster	Donegal	650	93	2,133	305	1,100	11	G926 915
158	66	Crohane	Mangerton Mountains	Munster	Kerry	650	385	2,133	1,263	1,100	79	W050 829
159	341	Dromderalough	Mangerton Mountains	Munster	Kerry	650	45	2,133	148	500	78	V961 790
160	255	An Cnapán Mór	Central Dingle	Munster	Kerry	649	81	2,129	266	1,400	70	Q522 045
161	105	Mullaghanish	Derrynasaggart Mountains	Munster	Cork/ Kerry	649	264	2,129	866	1,500	79	W215 818
162	215	Coomcallee	Dunkerron Mountains	Munster	Kerry	649	104	2,129	341	1,700	83	V624 677
163	234	Seahan	Dublin Mountains	Leinster	Dublin	647	94	2,124	308	1,000	56	O081 197
164	33	Truskmore	Dartry Mountains	Connacht	Sligo	647	560	2,123	1,837	500	16	G759 473
165	99	Devilsmother	Partry Mountains	Connacht	Galway/ Mayo	645	280	2,116	919	800	37	L916 624
166	125	Coomnadiha	Caha Mountains	Munster	Kerry	644	209	2,113	686	1,500	85	V847 600
167	54	Musheramore	Boggeragh Mountains	Munster	Cork	643	439	2,109	1,440	2,300	79	W329 850
168	264	Ardnageer	Bluestack Mountains	Ulster	Donegal	642	77	2,106	253	800	11	G969 909
169	195	Tonduff	Wicklow Mountains	Leinster	Wicklow	642	117	2,106	384	1,200	56	O159 137
170	145	Cnoc na Bánóige	Central Dingle	Munster	Kerry	642	176	2,105	577	1,000	70	Q548 048
171	144	Cush	Galty Mountains	Munster	Tipperary	641	176	2,104	578	2,100	74	R894 262
172	265	Croaghbane	Bluestack Mountains	Ulster	Donegal	641	76	2,103	249	900	11	G978 911
173	61	Knocklomena	Dunkerron Mountains	Munster	Kerry	641	406	2,103	1,332	1,700	78	V797 766
174	115	Scarr	Wicklow Mountains	Leinster	Wicklow	641	231	2,103	758	900	56	O133 018
175	388	Drung Hill	Glenbeigh Horseshoe	Munster	Kerry	640	35	2,100	115	1,200	78/83	V602 878
176	79	Cnoc na gCapall	Dunkerron Mountains	Munster	Kerry	639	334	2,096	1,096	800	78	V834 767
177	292	Beann South Top	Dunkerron Mountains	Munster	Kerry	639	64	2,096	210	900	78	V728 755
178	107	Eagle Mountain	Mourne Mountains	Ulster	Down	638	263	2,093	863	500	29	J245 230
179	332	Binn Fraoigh	Twelve Bens	Connacht	Galway	638	48	2,093	157	900	37	L778 544
180	169	Knocknamanagh	Shehy Mountains	Munster	Kerry	637	139	2,090	456	1,600	85	V990 661
181	278	Coomnacronia	Dunkerron Mountains	Munster	Kerry	636	71	2,087	233	1,200	78	V680 734
182	198	Lobawn	Wicklow Mountains	Leinster	Wicklow	636	111	2,087	364	1,500	56	S978 978
183	126	Mullaghclogha	Sperrin Mountains	Ulster	Tyrone	635	207	2,083	679	1,200	13	H556 958
184	172	Kells Mountain	Iveragh NW	Munster	Kerry	633	138	2,077	453	800	83	V529 858
185	208	Binn Chaonaigh	Maamturks	Connacht	Galway	633	108	2,077	354	500	37	L900 515
186	157	An Chailleach	Twelve Bens	Connacht	Galway	632	154	2,073	505	700	37	L756 537
187	249	Boughil	Dunkerron Mountains	Munster	Kerry	631	86	2,070	282	800	78	V842 765
188	233	Monabrack	Galty Mountains	Munster	Limerick	630	94	2,067	308	1,200	74	R859 219
189	380	Laghtshanaquilla	Galty Mountains	Munster	Tipperary	629	36	2,065	118	800	74	R951 250
190	252	Knocknalougha	Knockmealdown Mountains	Munster	Tipperary/ Waterford	629	84	2,064	276	1,500	74	S019 100
191	170	Glennamong	Nephin Beg Range	Connacht	Mayo	628	139	2,060	456	1,400	23/30	F913 059
192	74	Nephin Beg	Nephin Beg Range	Connacht	Mayo	627	365	2,057	1,198	2,000	23	F932 102
193	88	Mullaghaneany	Sperrin Mountains	Ulster	Londonderry/ Tyrone	627	302	2,057	991	1,200	13	H686 986
194	403	Shanlieve	Mourne Mountains	Ulster	Down	626	31	2,054	102	500	29	J240 227
195	304	Knocknamanagh NE Top	Shehy Mountains	Munster	Kerry	625	60	2,051	197	1,000	85	W002 673
196	120	An Scraig	Brandon Group	Munster	Kerry	623	218	2,044	715	900	70	Q460 057
197	248	Mullach Glas	Maamturks	Connacht	Galway	622	87	2,041	285	500	45	L937 493
198	116	Maulin	Caha Mountains	Munster	Cork	621	226	2,037	741	700	84	V713 505
199	250	Meenard Mountain	Sperrin Mountains	Ulster	Londonderry/ Tyrone	620	85	2,034	279	1,200	13	H673 985
200	246	Dart Mountain	Sperrin Mountains	Ulster	Londonderry/ Tyrone	619	89	2,031	292	1,200	13	H603 964
201	75	Leenaun Hill	Maamturks	Connacht	Galway	618	363	2,028	1,191	1,500	37	L874 593
202	218	Coumaraglin Mountain	Comeragh Mountains	Munster	Waterford	617	102	2,024	335	2,700	75	S282 043
203	212	Slieve Loughshannagh	Mourne Mountains	Ulster	Down	617	104	2,024	341	900	29	J294 272
204	26	Slieve Snaght	Inishowen	Ulster	Donegal	615	600	2,018	1,969	1,600	3	C424 390
205	211	Tievebaun	Dartry Mountains	Connacht	Leitrim	611	106	2,005	348	2,700	16	G768 498
206	354	Coombane	Central Dingle	Munster	Kerry	610	42	2,001	138	1,000	70	Q568 092
207	342	Knockbrack	Mangerton Mountains	Munster	Kerry	610	45	2,001	148	1,300	78	V953 779
208	118	Corcóg	Maamturks	Connacht	Galway	609	221	1,998	725	1,100	45	L952 492
209	325	Macklaun	Glenbeigh Horseshoe	Munster	Kerry	607	52	1,991	171	1,700	78/83	V660 837
210	160	Cnoc na hUilleann	Maamturks	Connacht	Galway	607	152	1,991	499	800	37	L870 537
211	37	Croghan Kinsella	Wicklow Mountains	Leinster	Wexford/ Wicklow	606	541	1,988	1,775	800	62	T130 729
212	112	Carran	Shehy Mountains	Munster	Kerry	604	237	1,982	778	900	85	W052 678
213	97	Lackabane	Caha Mountains	Munster	Kerry	603	288	1,978	945	1,000	84	V751 537
214	371	Gullaba Hill	Shehy Mountains	Munster	Kerry	603	38	1,978	125	1,000	85	W005 683
215	73	Aghla Beg (South)	Derryveagh Mountains	Ulster	Donegal	602	368	1,976	1,207	700	2	B965 246
216	283	Black Hill	Wicklow Mountains	Leinster	Wicklow	602	67	1,976	220	2,300	56	O041 090
217	319	Maumonght	Twelve Bens	Connacht	Galway	602	54	1,975	177	700	37	L749 539
218	287	Knockeenatoung	Galty Mountains	Munster	Tipperary	601	66	1,973	218	1,500	74	R895 219
219	174	Eskatarriff	Caha Mountains	Munster	Cork/ Kerry	601	136	1,970	445	700	84	V736 533
220	155	Silver Hill	Bluestack Mountains	Ulster	Donegal	600	155	1,969	509	1,100	11	G906 913
221	389	Castle Hill	Slieve Mish	Munster	Kerry	600	35	1,969	115	1,400	71	Q756 063
222	156	Sorrel Hill	Wicklow Mountains	Leinster	Wicklow	600	155	1,967	507	2,200	56	O042 119
223	213	Coomacloghane	Caha Mountains	Munster	Cork/ Kerry	599	104	1,965	341	1,000	84	V733 548
224	34	Garraun	Twelve Bens	Connacht	Galway	598	553	1,962	1,814	600	37	L767 610
225	122	Annacoona Top	Dartry Mountains	Connacht	Sligo	597	212	1,959	696	1,700	16	G728 463
226	49	Slieve League	Donegal SW	Ulster	Donegal	596	470	1,957	1,542	800	10	G544 784
227	220	Drumnalifferny Mountain	Derryveagh Mountains	Ulster	Donegal	596	101	1,955	331	500	1	B934 156
228	361	Slieve Beg	Mourne Mountains	Ulster	Down	596	41	1,955	134	600	29	J340 276
229	200	Bascadh	Dunkerron Mountains	Munster	Kerry	595	110	1,952	361	1,000	78	V824 766
230	201	Luggala	Wicklow Mountains	Leinster	Wicklow	595	110	1,952	361	2,000	56	O150 074
231	306	Cushnaficulla	Caha Mountains	Munster	Cork/ Kerry	594	59	1,949	194	1,000	84	V821 559
232	65	Aghla Mountain	Bluestack Mountains	Ulster	Donegal	593	388	1,946	1,273	400	11	G897 989
233	333	Knockmulanane	Central Dingle	Munster	Kerry	593	48	1,946	157	900	70	Q568 049
234	193	Doan	Mourne Mountains	Ulster	Down	593	119	1,944	389	1,100	29	J302 262
235	353	Tooth Mountain	Caha Mountains	Munster	Kerry	592	42	1,942	139	600	84	V742 554
236	288	Beenatoor	Central Dingle	Munster	Kerry	592	66	1,942	217	1,000	70	Q559 089
237	164	Knocknabro West Top	Derrynasaggart Mountains	Munster	Kerry	592	147	1,942	482	1,400	79	W154 854
238	313	Cnoc Breasail	Dunkerron Mountains	Munster	Kerry	591	56	1,939	184	1,200	78&83	V653 725
239	173	Coomnahorna	Dunkerron Mountains	Munster	Kerry	590	136	1,936	446	1,500	83&84	V640 685
240	316	Tievnabinnia East Top	Sheeffry Hills	Connacht	Mayo	590	55	1,936	180	1,600	37	L897 705
241	45	Slieve Foye	Cooley Mountains	Leinster	Louth	589	494	1,932	1,621	800	29&36A	J169 120
242	57	Buckoogh	Nephin Beg Range	Connacht	Mayo	588	423	1,929	1,388	2,600	31	F995 017
243	179	Knocknagree	Caha Mountains	Munster	Cork	586	131	1,923	430	1,300	84	V727 506
244	205	Glendoo Mountain	Dublin Mountains	Leinster	Dublin/ Wicklow	586	109	1,923	358	2,000	50	O142 204
245	359	Slievenaglogh	Mourne Mountains	Ulster	Down	586	41	1,923	135	300	29	J328 291
246	241	Caherbla	Slieve Mish	Munster	Kerry	586	91	1,923	299	1,800	71	Q724 052
247	328	Carn Mountain	Mourne Mountains	Ulster	Down	585	50	1,920	165	500	29	J288 260
248	111	Slieve Anierin	Breifne Mountains	Connacht	Leitrim	585	245	1,919	804	2,200	26	H018 159
249	262	Knockastakeen	Galty Mountains	Munster	Tipperary	583	78	1,913	256	1,800	74	R915 258
250	117	Bengorm	Nephin Beg Range	Connacht	Mayo	582	225	1,909	738	1,600	31	F928 013
251	106	Benbrack	Twelve Bens	Connacht	Galway	582	264	1,909	866	1,000	37	L766 558
252	153	Aghla More	Derryveagh Mountains	Ulster	Donegal	581	156	1,907	512	800	1	B950 239
253	338	Mullaghasturrakeen	Sperrin Mountains	Ulster	Tyrone	581	46	1,906	151	1,200	13	H548 950
254	381	Benchoona	Twelve Bens	Connacht	Galway	581	36	1,906	118	500	37	L763 617
255	343	Barrclashcame North-West Top	Sheeffry Hills	Connacht	Mayo	580	45	1,903	148	1,300	37	L838 700
256	395	Bingorms	Derryveagh Mountains	Ulster	Donegal	578	33	1,896	108	1,100	1	B934 143
257	192	Slievenashaska	Dunkerron Mountains	Munster	Kerry	578	123	1,896	404	900	78&83	V642 708
258	406	Knockeirky	Caha Mountains	Munster	Cork/Kerry	577	30	1,893	98	1,000	84	V832 557
259	297	Benlettery	Twelve Bens	Connacht	Galway	577	62	1,893	203	1,100	44	L775 495
260	355	Bencorrbeg	Twelve Bens	Connacht	Galway	577	42	1,893	138	600	37	L816 533
261	330	Brassel Mountain	MacGillycuddy's Reeks	Munster	Kerry	575	50	1,886	164	1,200	78	V830 823
262	50	Bunnacunneen	Partry Mountains	Connacht	Galway	575	463	1,886	1,519	400	38	L939 577
263	188	Sugarloaf Mountain	Caha Mountains	Munster	Cork	574	126	1,883	413	1,100	85	V874 529
264	377	Knocknagowan	Derrynasaggart Mountains	Munster	Kerry	574	37	1,883	121	2,000	79	W186 850
265	48	Slieve Gullion	Cooley Mountains	Ulster	Armagh	573	478	1,880	1,568	4,300	29	J025 203
266	263	Skregbeg	MacGillycuddy's Reeks	Munster	Kerry	573	78	1,880	256	1,500	78	V787 874
267	405	Carrigshouk	Wicklow Mountains	Leinster	Wicklow	573	31	1,878	101	2,200	56	O098 052
268	286	Lackawee	Caha Mountains	Munster	Cork	572	67	1,877	220	900	84	V704 517
269	186	Mullaghclogher	Sperrin Mountains	Ulster	Tyrone	572	127	1,877	417	1,100	13	H530 949
270	103	Croaghnageer	Bluestack Mountains	Ulster	Donegal	571	266	1,873	873	700	11	H011 886
271	398	Caora Bhán	Dunkerron Mountains	Munster	Kerry	570	32	1,870	105	400	78	V705 747
272	280	Maulin	Wicklow Mountains	Leinster	Wicklow	570	70	1,870	230	1,400	56	O184 131
273	269	Knocknabreeda	Dunkerron Mountains	Munster	Kerry	569	74	1,867	243	2,300	78	V815 793
274	320	Knockaunanattin	Dunkerron Mountains	Munster	Kerry	569	54	1,867	177	1,000	78	V769 791
275	214	Oughtmore	Sperrin Mountains	Ulster	Londonderry/ Tyrone	569	104	1,867	341	900	13	H700 975
276	356	Carran South Top	Shehy Mountains	Munster	Kerry	567	42	1,860	138	900	85	W055 671
277	382	Slievenashaska South Top	Dunkerron Mountains	Munster	Kerry	566	36	1,857	118	900	84	V643 699
278	180	Conigar	Shehy Mountains	Munster	Cork	566	131	1,857	430	1,200	85	W060 628
279	96	Moanlaur	Slieve Mish	Munster	Kerry	566	289	1,857	948	600	71	Q690 045
280	93	Gaugin Mountain	Bluestack Mountains	Ulster	Donegal	565	290	1,854	951	3,100	6&11	G983 950
281	307	Birreencorragh South Top	Nephin Beg Range	Connacht	Mayo	564	59	1,850	194	1,900	31	G024 032
282	352	Aghla Beg	Derryveagh Mountains	Ulster	Donegal	564	43	1,850	140	700	2	B962 253
283	312	Knockacullion	Breifne Mountains	Connacht	Leitrim	562	57	1,844	187	2,000	26	H031 178
284	85	Carnanelly	Sperrin Mountains	Ulster	Tyrone	562	307	1,844	1,007	1,200	13	H675 921
285	383	Carran Far North-East Top	Shehy Mountains	Munster	Kerry	561	36	1,841	118	900	85	W066 694
286	314	Barnanageehy	Slieve Mish	Munster	Kerry	561	56	1,841	184	3,300	71	Q800 082
287	251	Sugarloaf Mtn Far West Top	Caha Mountains	Munster	Cork	560	85	1,837	279	200	85	V860 532
288	158	Slievemoughanmore	Mourne Mountains	Ulster	Down	560	154	1,837	505	900	29	J250 241
289	175	Ben Beg	Partry Mountains	Connacht	Galway	560	135	1,837	443	1,200	38	L951 579
290	310	Knockmeal	Knockmealdown Mountains	Munster	Tipperary/ Waterford	560	58	1,836	190	1,200	74	S102 083
291	270	Ben Goram	Croagh Patrick	Connacht	Mayo	559	74	1,834	243	1,900	30	L887 800
292	399	Brockagh Mountain	Wicklow Mountains	Leinster	Wicklow	557	32	1,827	105	800	56	T108 990
293	404	Garraun South Top	Twelve Bens	Connacht	Galway	556	31	1,824	102	600	37	L763 606
294	163	Mackoght	Derryveagh Mountains	Ulster	Donegal	555	150	1,821	492	1,400	1	B940 215
295	294	Knocknagun	Dublin Mountains	Leinster	Dublin/ Wicklow	555	63	1,821	207	1,300	56	O163 187
296	295	Prince William's Seat	Dublin Mountains	Leinster	Dublin/ Wicklow	555	63	1,821	207	1,300	56	O177 182
297	100	Peakeen Mountain	Mangerton Mountains	Munster	Kerry	555	280	1,820	919	1,400	78	V903 765
298	206	Derryclancy	Caha Mountains	Munster	Cork/ Kerry	554	109	1,818	358	1,300	84	V769 513
299	308	Knockrower	Mangerton Mountains	Munster	Kerry	554	59	1,818	194	1,300	78	V937 785
300	367	Dooish South-East Top	Derryveagh Mountains	Ulster	Donegal	554	39	1,817	128	800	6	B989 206
301	127	Dromavally Mountain	Central Dingle	Munster	Kerry	552	206	1,811	676	2,600	71	Q606 067
302	384	Birreencorragh West Top	Nephin Beg Range	Connacht	Mayo	551	36	1,808	118	1,000	23&31	G015 050
303	41	Trostan	Antrim Hills	Ulster	Antrim	550	515	1,804	1,690	2,500	9	D179 236
304	344	Búcán	Maamturks	Connacht	Galway	550	45	1,804	148	1,000	37	L852 607
305	113	Mullaghmore	Sperrin Mountains	Ulster	Derry	550	235	1,804	771	1,400	8	C739 008
306	114	Eagles Hill	Dunkerron Mountains	Munster	Kerry	549	234	1,801	768	1,100	83&84	V583 632
307	236	Croaghanirwore	Bluestack Mountains	Ulster	Donegal	548	93	1,798	305	1,100	11	H002 892
308	238	Slieve Maan	Wicklow Mountains	Leinster	Wicklow	548	93	1,797	304	800	62	T082 880
309	110	Knocknacusha	Dunkerron Mountains	Munster	Kerry	547	252	1,795	827	1,600	78&83	V675 782
310	77	Shehy More	Shehy Mountains	Munster	Cork	546	351	1,790	1,152	1,600	85	W115 600
311	47	Knockalongy	Ox Mountains	Connacht	Sligo	544	490	1,785	1,608	900	25	G504 275
312	184	Church Mountain	Wicklow Mountains	Leinster	Wicklow	544	129	1,785	423	2,100	56	N949 012
313	225	Slievenanee	Antrim Hills	Ulster	Antrim	543	98	1,781	322	2,500	9	D167 213
314	101	Mauherslieve	Mauherslieve	Munster	Tipperary	543	268	1,781	879	1,600	59	R873 619
315	137	The Playbank	Breifne Mountains	Connacht	Leitrim	542	187	1,778	614	5,000	26	H033 258
316	68	Mullaghcarn	Sperrin Mountains	Ulster	Tyrone	542	377	1,778	1,237	900	13	H510 810
317	339	Sturrakeen	Galty Mountains	Munster	Tipperary	542	46	1,777	151	1,600	74	R973 253
318	42	Slieve Aghkerane	Achill	Connacht	Mayo	541	506	1,775	1,660	2,300	30	L777 961
319	385	Cnoc na hUilleann North Top	Maamturks	Connacht	Galway	541	36	1,775	118	600	37	L872 545
320	230	Knockroe	Blackstairs Mountains	Leinster	Carlow	540	95	1,772	312	3,000	68	S819 497
321	394	Benbeg	Breifne Mountains	Ulster	Cavan	539	34	1,768	112	2,100	26&27A	H121 254
322	91	Moylenanav	Glendowan Mountains	Ulster	Donegal	539	294	1,768	965	2,400	1	B955 133
323	237	Peakeen Mountain West Top	Mangerton Mountains	Munster	Kerry	539	93	1,767	305	200	78	V890 765
324	254	Killane Mountain	Caha Mountains	Munster	Cork/ Kerry	537	82	1,762	269	700	85	V873 596
325	357	White Mountain	Sperrin Mountains	Ulster	Derry	537	42	1,762	138	1,400	8	C742 022
326	147	Two Rock Mountain	Dublin Mountains	Leinster	Dublin	536	171	1,759	561	2,300	50	O172 223
327	119	Ballycurragh Hill	Wicklow Mountains	Leinster	Wicklow	536	221	1,759	725	2,200	62	T057 823
328	89	Nowen Hill	Shehy Mountains	Munster	Cork	535	300	1,756	985	1,600	85	W141 529
329	90	Torc Mountain	Mangerton Mountains	Munster	Kerry	535	300	1,755	984	600	78	V955 839
330	260	An Cnoc Riabhach	Dunkerron Mountains	Munster	Kerry	534	79	1,752	259	1,800	78	V758 760
331	171	Pigeon Rock Mountain	Mourne Mountains	Ulster	Down	534	139	1,752	456	700	29	J261 250
332	55	Slieve Croob	Mourne Mountains	Ulster	Down	534	439	1,752	1,440	1,100	20	J318 453
333	185	Knocknacloghoge	Wicklow Mountains	Leinster	Wicklow	534	129	1,752	423	2,100	56	O143 054
334	368	Eskatarriff East Top	Caha Mountains	Munster	Kerry	533	38	1,748	125	700	84	V743 532
335	378	Knockboy South Top	Shehy Mountains	Munster	Cork	532	37	1,745	121	1,500	85	W006 605
336	43	Moylussa	Slieve Bernagh	Munster	Clare	532	502	1,744	1,646	2,200	58	R648 759
337	315	Ballinacor Mountain	Wicklow Mountains	Leinster	Wicklow	531	56	1,742	184	1,800	62	T117 865
338	196	Corriebracks	Wicklow Mountains	Leinster	Wicklow	531	116	1,742	381	2,100	56	N967 003
339	390	Nareera	Caha Mountains	Munster	Cork	530	35	1,739	115	500	85	V855 532
340	267	Coomataggart	Shehy Mountains	Munster	Cork/ Kerry	530	75	1,739	246	1,800	85	W100 690
341	259	Crockfadda	Derryveagh Mountains	Ulster	Donegal	529	80	1,736	262	1,000	1	B910 136
342	67	Seefin Mountain W Top	Ballyhoura Mountains	Munster	Limerick	528	383	1,732	1,257	900	73	R644 181
343	80	Slieve Gallion	Sperrin Mountains	Ulster	Derry	528	333	1,732	1,093	2,400	13	H799 878
344	58	Arderin	Slieve Bloom	Leinster	Laois/ Offaly	527	420	1,729	1,378	1,200	54	S232 989
345	401	Ott Mountain	Mourne Mountains	Ulster	Down	527	32	1,728	104	800	29	J284 270
346	299	Benbulbin	Dartry Mountains	Connacht	Sligo	526	61	1,726	200	1,200	16	G692 463
347	256	Ben Crom	Mourne Mountains	Ulster	Down	526	81	1,726	266	1,100	29	J313 260
348	327	Cragnamurragh	Slieve Bernagh	Munster	Clare	526	51	1,726	167	1,200	58	R629 749
349	162	Crockbrack	Sperrin Mountains	Ulster	Derry	526	151	1,726	495	2,300	13	H718 957
350	123	Doughruagh	Twelve Bens	Connacht	Galway	526	211	1,726	692	100	37	L751 594
351	245	Slievebawn	Blackstairs Mountains	Leinster	Carlow	525	90	1,722	294	3,000	68	S806 548
352	216	Corraun Hill	Achill	Connacht	Mayo	524	103	1,719	338	2,300	30	L754 960
353	305	Rocky Mountain	Mourne Mountains	Ulster	Down	524	60	1,719	197	1,400	29	J351 252
354	102	Croaghconnellagh	Bluestack Mountains	Ulster	Donegal	523	268	1,716	879	1,700	11	H023 863
355	56	Arroo Mountain	Dartry Mountains	Connacht	Leitrim	523	436	1,716	1,430	2,800	16	G833 521
356	150	Carnaween	Bluestack Mountains	Ulster	Donegal	521	166	1,709	545	2,600	11	G876 891
357	266	Crohan West	Knockmealdown Mountains	Munster	Tipperary	521	76	1,709	249	1,900	74	S097 102
358	189	Laghtnafrankee	Comeragh Mountains	Munster	Waterford	520	126	1,706	413	1,800	75	S235 181
359	321	The Priests Leap	Shehy Mountains	Munster	Cork/ Kerry	519	54	1,703	177	2,100	85	V978 606
360	253	Bencroy	Breifne Mountains	Connacht	Leitrim	518	83	1,699	272	2,000	26	H045 191
361	281	Farbreaga	Knockmealdown Mountains	Munster	Tipperary	518	70	1,699	228	500	74	R968 092
362	350	Knocklaur	Partry Mountains	Connacht	Galway/ Mayo	518	43	1,699	141	1,900	38	L935 631
363	146	Crocknafarragh	Derryveagh Mountains	Ulster	Donegal	517	172	1,696	564	700	1	B878 167
364	239	Knockaffertagh	Nephin Beg Range	Connacht	Mayo	517	92	1,696	302	2,300	23&31	G047 048
365	400	Mullaghcarbatagh	Sperrin Mountains	Ulster	Tyrone	517	32	1,696	105	1,100	13	H517 948
366	51	Sliabh an Iolair	Dingle West	Munster	Kerry	516	461	1,693	1,512	3,500	70	V334 989
367	279	Barnahowna	Partry Mountains	Connacht	Mayo	516	71	1,693	233	2,200	38	M002 675
368	334	Benglenisky	Twelve Bens	Connacht	Galway	516	48	1,693	157	1,100	37	L766 501
369	53	Brandon Hill	Brandon Hill	Leinster	Kilkenny	515	450	1,690	1,476	5,600	68	S697 402
370	363	Beenduff	Slieve Mish	Munster	Kerry	515	40	1,690	131	900	71	Q677 037
371	64	Knocklayd	Antrim Hills	Ulster	Antrim	514	389	1,686	1,276	5,600	5	D115 364
372	366	Benwiskin	Dartry Mountains	Connacht	Sligo	514	39	1,686	128	1,300	16	G723 491
373	290	An Bhinn Láir	Dunkerron Mountains	Munster	Kerry	514	65	1,686	213	1,400	78&83	V630 714
374	222	Slieve Main	Inishowen	Ulster	Donegal	514	100	1,686	328	1,600	3	C413 378
375	261	Stillbrook Hill	Slieve Bloom	Leinster	Offaly	514	79	1,686	259	2,100	54	N262 030
376	228	Annatoran	Ox Mountains	Connacht	Sligo	512	97	1,680	318	2,500	24	G475 245
377	70	Sliabh Tuaidh	Donegal SW	Ulster	Donegal	511	376	1,677	1,234	1,300	10	G629 899
378	391	Seefin Mountain E Top	Ballyhoura Mountains	Munster	Limerick	510	35	1,673	115	800	73	R653 179
379	392	Cummeenbaun	Caha Mountains	Munster	Kerry	510	35	1,673	115	800	84	V823 581
380	84	Clermont Carn	Cooley Mountains	Leinster	Louth	510	312	1,673	1,024	900	29&36A	J099 157
381	231	Tawny Rower	Sheeffry Hills	Connacht	Mayo	510	95	1,673	312	2,300	37	L918 714
382	176	Dho Bran	Blackstairs Mountains	Leinster	Carlow/ Wexford	509	134	1,670	440	1,600	68	S787 403
383	293	Mullaghbeg	Dunkerron Mountains	Munster	Kerry	509	64	1,670	210	1,400	83&84	V559 637
384	142	Knockanaguish	Mangerton Mountains	Munster	Kerry	509	178	1,670	584	1,600	78	V919 768
385	346	Nowen Hill SW Top	Shehy Mountains	Munster	Cork	509	44	1,670	144	1,500	85	W128 520
386	271	Baunreaghcong	Slieve Bloom	Leinster	Laois	509	74	1,670	243	1,800	54	N327 037
387	143	Slieveanorra	Antrim Hills	Ulster	Antrim	508	178	1,667	584	4,500	5	D134 266
388	351	Carrickashane Mountain	Wicklow Mountains	Leinster	Wicklow	508	43	1,667	141	2,000	62	T078 860
389	161	Knocknagorraveela	Caha Mountains	Munster	Kerry	507	152	1,663	499	1,200	85	V871 625
390	298	Saggartnadooish	Derryveagh Mountains	Ulster	Donegal	506	61	1,661	201	900	6	B991 217
391	139	Coomagearlahy	Derrynasaggart Mountains	Munster	Kerry	506	181	1,660	594	900	79	W095 772
392	240	Mothaillín	Dunkerron Mountains	Munster	Kerry	506	92	1,660	302	1,700	78	V852 805
393	360	Carran Far North Top	Shehy Mountains	Munster	Kerry	506	41	1,660	135	1,300	79	W056 702
394	358	Binnasruell	Bluestack Mountains	Ulster	Donegal	505	42	1,657	138	1,800	11	G917 898
395	407	Carnanelly West Top	Sperrin Mountains	Ulster	Tyrone	505	30	1,657	98	1,100	13	H664 921
396	181	Cock Mountain	Mourne Mountains	Ulster	Down	504	130	1,654	427	300	29	J253 268
397	348	Knockahunna	Slievenamon	Munster	Tipperary	503	44	1,650	144	1,200	67	S302 327
398	165	Benbrack	Breifne Mountains	Ulster	Cavan	502	147	1,647	482	2,200	26&27A	H101 217
399	379	Crockfadda North-East Top	Derryveagh Mountains	Ulster	Donegal	502	37	1,647	121	900	1	B915 144
400	187	Caunoge	Glenbeigh Horseshoe	Munster	Kerry	502	127	1,647	417	3,800	83	V582 800
401	59	Raghtin More	Inishowen	Ulster	Donegal	502	407	1,647	1,335	700	2&3	C339 455
402	166	Claggan Mountain NE Top	Nephin Beg Range	Connacht	Mayo	501	146	1,644	479	1,300	30	F858 011
403	121	Great Sugar Loaf	Wicklow Mountains	Leinster	Wicklow	501	216	1,644	709	2,200	56	O238 131
404	291	Knockreagh	Caha Mountains	Munster	Kerry	500	65	1,640	213	1,400	84	V827 613
405	272	Crott Mountain	Croagh Patrick	Connacht	Mayo	500	74	1,640	243	800	31	L929 804
406	232	Butter Mountain	Mourne Mountains	Ulster	Down	500	95	1,640	312	1,300	29	J275 279

== List of 274 Irish Vandeleur-Lynams ==
(height above 600 m, prominence over 15 m)

The broadest noted definition of an Irish mountain over 600 m (1,969 ft) is the Vandeleur-Lynam list, as it only requires a prominence of 15 m (49 ft), and is the Irish fully metric equivalent of the England & Wales Nuttall. (Note: Nuttalls are only listed for England and Wales) The 100 Highest Irish Mountains from above, is a subset of this list (e.g. they are all Vandeleur-Lynams). For example, Mweelrea, the highest mountain in Connacht, is 16th on the 100 Highest Irish Mountains list, but 34th on the Vandeleur-Lynam list. MountainView's Online Database of Vandeleur-Lynams was published by Collins Press in the 2013 book: A Guide to Ireland's Mountain Summits: The Vandeleur-Lynams & the Arderins, and updated in 2015. In 2023, the MountainView Online Database listed 275 Irish mountains as meeting the Vandeleur-Lynam definition. (Note: The 2013 Collins book listed 269 Vandeleur-Lynams, however, based on various OSI data updates, MountainView have updated their database since, and the Mountain 2023 database lists 275 Vandeleur-Lynams)

On 3 October 2018, English Lake District climber, James Forrest, completed all 273 Irish Vandeleur-Lynams in 8 weeks. In 2023, Irish photographer and adventurer Ellie Berry completed the Vandeleur-Lynams, then at 275 peaks, in 50 days and 5 hours beating the previous record by 6 days. This record was in turn broken in 2024 by Kerryman Sean Clifford who scaled all 275 peaks in 21 days, 2 hours, and 46 minutes.

Irish Vandeleur-Lynams (MountainViews Online Database, October 2018)
Height Rank	Prom. Rank	Name	Range/Area	Province	County	Height (m)	Prom. (m)	Height (ft)	Prom. (ft)	Isolation (Note: This is not topographic isolation, but is the distance to the nearest mountain of any height, but with a minimum prominence of 15 metres (49 ft), as per the Irish MountainViews Online Database) (m)	Topo Map	OSI/OSNI Grid
1	1	Carrauntoohil	MacGillycuddy's Reeks	Munster	Kerry	1,039	1,039	3,407	3,407	400	78	V804844
2	144	Beenkeragh	MacGillycuddy's Reeks	Munster	Kerry	1,008	91	3,308	298	600	78	V801852
3	136	Caher	MacGillycuddy's Reeks	Munster	Kerry	1,000	100	3,281	327	300	78	V793839
4	73	Cnoc na Péiste	MacGillycuddy's Reeks	Munster	Kerry	988	253	3,241	830	500	78	V836842
5	238	Caher West Top	MacGillycuddy's Reeks	Munster	Kerry	973	24	3,194	79	300	78	V790840
6	204	Maolán Buí	MacGillycuddy's Reeks	Munster	Kerry	973	38	3,192	125	500	78	V832838
7	183	Cnoc an Chuillinn	MacGillycuddy's Reeks	Munster	Kerry	958	53	3,143	174	500	78	V823833
8	207	Na Cnámha	MacGillycuddy's Reeks	Munster	Kerry	957	37	3,138	122	400	78	V801847
9	2	Brandon	Brandon Group	Munster	Kerry	952	934	3,122	3,064	600	70	Q460116
10	158	The Big Gun	MacGillycuddy's Reeks	Munster	Kerry	939	74	3,081	243	300	78	V840845
11	217	Cruach Mhór	MacGillycuddy's Reeks	Munster	Kerry	932	34	3,058	112	300	78	V841848
12	253	Cnoc an Chuillinn East Top	MacGillycuddy's Reeks	Munster	Kerry	926	21	3,038	69	500	78	V828834
13	3	Lugnaquilla	Wicklow Mountains	Leinster	Wicklow	925	905	3,035	2,969	1,700	56	T032917
14	4	Galtymore	Galty Mountains	Munster	Limerick / Tipperary	918	898	3,011	2,946	1,000	74	R878238
15	243	Brandon North Top	Brandon Group	Munster	Kerry	895	23	2,938	76	400	70	Q461125
16	222	Knockbrinnea (W)	MacGillycuddy's Reeks	Munster	Kerry	854	29	2,802	95	300	78	V807858
17	244	Stumpa Bharr na hAbhann	MacGillycuddy's Reeks	Munster	Kerry	852	23	2,796	76	500	78	V797858
18	20	Baurtregaum	Slieve Mish	Munster	Kerry	851	643	2,792	2,110	700	71	Q749076
19	5	Slieve Donard	Mourne Mountains	Ulster	Down	850	822	2,789	2,697	1,000	29	J357277
20	50	Mullaghcleevaun	Wicklow Mountains	Leinster	Wicklow	849	374	2,785	1,227	1,500	56	O068070
21	188	Skregmore	MacGillycuddy's Reeks	Munster	Kerry	848	50	2,781	164	500	78	V792860
22	251	Knockbrinnea (E)	MacGillycuddy's Reeks	Munster	Kerry	847	22	2,779	72	300	78	V810857
23	155	Cnoc na Toinne	MacGillycuddy's Reeks	Munster	Kerry	845	80	2,772	262	1,200	78	V811833
24	258	Brandon Far North Top	Brandon Group	Munster	Kerry	840	17	2,756	57	400	70	Q459128
25	89	Brandon Peak	Brandon Group	Munster	Kerry	840	190	2,756	623	800	70	Q472095
26	28	Mangerton	Mangerton Mountains	Munster	Kerry	838	583	2,750	1,913	1,200	78	V980808
27	113	Caherconree	Slieve Mish	Munster	Kerry	835	129	2,740	423	900	71	Q733073
28	27	Purple Mountain	Purple Mountain	Munster	Kerry	832	597	2,730	1,959	1,000	78	V887852
29	41	Beenoskee	Central Dingle	Munster	Kerry	826	491	2,710	1,611	700	70	Q580089
30	135	Lyracappul	Galty Mountains	Munster	Limerick	825	100	2,708	328	700	74	R845232
31	231	Carrignabinnia	Galty Mountains	Munster	Limerick	823	27	2,700	88	700	74	R850237
32	179	Benagh	Brandon Group	Munster	Kerry	822	57	2,697	187	500	70	Q469119
33	82	Tonelagee	Wicklow Mountains	Leinster	Wicklow	817	202	2,680	663	1,100	56	O085016
34	6	Mweelrea	Mweelrea Mountains	Connacht	Mayo	814	779	2,671	2,556	1,500	37	L789668
35	197	Faha Ridge	Brandon Group	Munster	Kerry	809	44	2,654	144	500	70	Q464120
36	7	Nephin	North Mayo	Connacht	Mayo	806	778	2,644	2,552	3,400	23/31	G103079
37	98	Ben Lugmore	Mweelrea Mountains	Connacht	Mayo	803	158	2,635	518	400	37	L812674
38	233	Gearhane	Brandon Group	Munster	Kerry	803	26	2,635	85	800	70	Q468087
39	99	Greenane	Galty Mountains	Munster	Tipperary	801	157	2,629	515	1,300	74	R925239
40	265	Cloghernagh	Wicklow Mountains	Leinster	Wicklow	800	15	2,625	49	1,300	56	T057919
41	154	Galtybeg	Galty Mountains	Munster	Tipperary	799	80	2,622	263	1,200	74	R890241
42	201	Stradbally Mountain	Central Dingle	Munster	Kerry	798	40	2,618	131	700	70	Q587092
43	174	Ben Bury	Mweelrea Mountains	Connacht	Mayo	795	60	2,608	197	700	37	L803683
44	10	Mount Leinster	Blackstairs Mountains	Leinster	Carlow/ Wexford	794	706	2,606	2,318	1,800	68	S827525
45	189	Corrigasleggaun	Wicklow Mountains	Leinster	Wicklow	794	49	2,605	161	1,300	56	T047910
46	15	Knockmealdown	Knockmealdown Mountains	Munster	Tipperary / Waterford	792	683	2,600	2,240	900	74	S058084
47	23	Fauscoum	Comeragh Mountains	Munster	Waterford	792	626	2,598	2,054	1,000	75	S316105
48	259	Gearhane	Slieve Mish	Munster	Kerry	792	17	2,598	56	900	71	Q733082
49	191	Ben Lugmore West Top	Mweelrea Mountains	Connacht	Mayo	790	47	2,592	154	700	37	L806677
50	194	Mullaghcleevaun East Top	Wicklow Mountains	Leinster	Wicklow	790	45	2,592	148	1,500	56	O082067
51	208	Ben Lugmore East Top	Mweelrea Mountains	Connacht	Mayo	790	37	2,592	121	400	37	L815672
52	234	Brandon South Top	Brandon Group	Munster	Kerry	790	25	2,592	82	1,200	70	Q468107
53	202	Greenane West	Galty Mountains	Munster	Tipperary	787	39	2,582	129	1,300	74	R910239
54	40	Stumpa Dúloigh	Dunkerron Mountains	Munster	Kerry	784	499	2,572	1,637	400	78	V787794
55	90	Temple Hill	Galty Mountains	Munster	Limerick	783	188	2,569	617	1,100	74	R833218
56	167	Mangerton North Top	Mangerton Mountains	Munster	Kerry	782	67	2,566	220	600	78	V984818
57	266	Stumpa Dúloigh SE Top	Dunkerron Mountains	Munster	Kerry	780	15	2,559	49	400	78	V790792
58	224	Slievecushnabinnia	Galty Mountains	Munster	Limerick / Tipperary	775	28	2,542	92	800	74	R858240
59	38	Mullaghanattin	Dunkerron Mountains	Munster	Kerry	773	528	2,536	1,732	800	78	V739773
60	9	Barrclashcame	Sheeffry Hills	Connacht	Mayo	772	707	2,533	2,320	1,200	37	L849695
61	42	Coomacarrea	Glenbeigh Horseshoe	Munster	Kerry	772	457	2,533	1,499	1,100	78/83	V611825
62	213	Knockmoylan	Knockmealdown Mountains	Munster	Tipperary	767	35	2,517	115	900	74	S058093
63	92	Slieve Commedagh	Mourne Mountains	Ulster	Down	767	180	2,516	591	900	29	J346286
64	240	Carrignagower	Comeragh Mountains	Munster	Waterford	767	24	2,516	79	1,100	75	S311122
65	21	Croagh Patrick	Croagh Patrick	Connacht	Mayo	764	639	2,507	2,096	900	30	L906802
66	192	Shehy Mountain	Purple Mountain	Munster	Kerry	762	47	2,500	154	800	78	V902857
67	209	Tievummera	Sheeffry Hills	Connacht	Mayo	762	37	2,500	121	1,200	37	L862695
68	122	Masatiompan	Brandon Group	Munster	Kerry	762	109	2,500	358	700	70	Q465145
69	235	Teeromoyle Mountain	Glenbeigh Horseshoe	Munster	Kerry	760	25	2,493	82	1,100	78/83	V604833
70	180	Slievemaan	Wicklow Mountains	Leinster	Wicklow	759	54	2,490	177	1,500	56	T018908
71	111	Camenabologue	Wicklow Mountains	Leinster	Wicklow	758	133	2,487	436	1,400	56	T023959
72	72	Kippure	Dublin Mountains	Leinster	Dublin / Wicklow	757	262	2,484	860	3,300	56	O116154
73	214	Purple Mountain NE Top	Purple Mountain	Munster	Kerry	757	35	2,484	115	800	78	V894858
74	65	Knockanaffrin	Comeragh Mountains	Munster	Waterford	755	289	2,477	948	1,100	75	S285154
75	97	Beann	Dunkerron Mountains	Munster	Kerry	752	166	2,467	545	800	78	V726765
76	11	Errigal	Derryveagh Mountains	Ulster	Donegal	751	688	2,464	2,257	1,400	1	B928207
77	198	Cnoc Íochtair	MacGillycuddy's Reeks	Munster	Kerry	746	44	2,448	144	700	78	V785860
78	67	Slieve Binnian	Mourne Mountains	Ulster	Down	746	282	2,447	925	600	29	J321233
79	218	Piaras Mór	Brandon Group	Munster	Kerry	746	33	2,447	108	200	70	Q464136
80	63	Broaghnabinnia	Dunkerron Mountains	Munster	Kerry	745	290	2,444	951	2,200	78	V801814
81	210	Tievnabinnia	Sheeffry Hills	Connacht	Mayo	742	37	2,434	121	1,600	37	L881706
82	165	Coumfea	Comeragh Mountains	Munster	Waterford	742	69	2,434	226	1,000	75	S295097
83	61	Slieve Bearnagh	Mourne Mountains	Ulster	Down	739	304	2,425	997	400	29	J313281
84	175	Tomies Mountain	Purple Mountain	Munster	Kerry	735	60	2,411	197	700	78	V895868
85	123	Conavalla	Wicklow Mountains	Leinster	Wicklow	734	109	2,408	358	1,800	56	T039972
86	37	Blackstairs Mountain	Blackstairs Mountains	Leinster	Carlow/ Wexford	732	540	2,402	1,772	1,900	68	S810448
87	140	Cnoc an Bhráca	MacGillycuddy's Reeks	Munster	Kerry	731	96	2,398	315	600	78	V858854
88	14	Binn Bhán	Twelve Bens	Connacht	Galway	729	684	2,392	2,244	900	37	L786539
89	236	Coumfea North Top	Comeragh Mountains	Munster	Waterford	728	25	2,389	82	1,000	75	S296107
90	161	Seefin	Comeragh Mountains	Munster	Waterford	726	71	2,382	233	2,700	75	S274068
91	83	Djouce	Wicklow Mountains	Leinster	Wicklow	725	200	2,379	656	1,400	56	O179103
92	261	Knockaunapeebra	Comeragh Mountains	Munster	Waterford	724	17	2,377	55	1,000	75	S312096
93	257	Baurtregaum NW Top	Slieve Mish	Munster	Kerry	723	18	2,372	59	700	71	Q747084
94	138	Seefingan	Dublin Mountains	Leinster	Dublin / Wicklow	723	98	2,372	321	1,500	56	O087170
95	18	Slieve Carr	Nephin Beg Range	Connacht	Mayo	721	646	2,365	2,119	2,500	23	F915145
96	8	Slievenamon	Slievenamon	Munster	Tipperary	720	711	2,363	2,333	1,100	67	S297307
97	170	Duff Hill	Wicklow Mountains	Leinster	Wicklow	720	65	2,362	213	1,600	56	O094083
98	116	Gravale	Wicklow Mountains	Leinster	Wicklow	718	123	2,356	404	1,600	56	O105094
99	34	Corranabinnia	Nephin Beg Range	Connacht	Mayo	716	541	2,349	1,775	800	30	F903032
100	121	Meenteog	Glenbeigh Horseshoe	Munster	Kerry	715	110	2,346	361	1,200	78/83	V638826
101	256	Stoney Top	Wicklow Mountains	Leinster	Wicklow	714	19	2,343	62	1,200	56	O082027
102	60	Binn Chorr	Twelve Bens	Connacht	Galway	711	306	2,333	1,004	300	37	L812522
103	262	Coumfea West Top	Comeragh Mountains	Munster	Waterford	711	16	2,333	52	1,400	75	S281095
104	13	Knockboy	Shehy Mountains	Munster	Cork / Kerry	706	685	2,316	2,247	600	85	W005620
105	145	Stoompa	Mangerton Mountains	Munster	Kerry	705	90	2,313	295	1,100	79	W006817
106	125	Moanbane	Wicklow Mountains	Leinster	Wicklow	703	108	2,306	354	1,600	56	O034068
107	84	Slievelamagan	Mourne Mountains	Ulster	Down	702	197	2,304	647	1,300	29	J329260
108	19	Binn idir an Dá Log	Maamturks	Connacht	Galway	702	644	2,303	2,113	600	37	L888528
109	86	Slieve Meelbeg	Mourne Mountains	Ulster	Down	702	193	2,303	633	800	29	J301279
110	264	Table Mountain	Wicklow Mountains	Leinster	Wicklow	702	16	2,302	52	1,400	56	T020973
111	16	Ben Gorm	Ben Gorm Mountains	Connacht	Mayo	700	670	2,297	2,198	1,000	37	L862653
112	162	Camaderry Mountain	Wicklow Mountains	Leinster	Wicklow	699	71	2,292	233	1,100	56	T081980
113	29	Birreencorragh	Nephin Beg Range	Connacht	Mayo	698	583	2,290	1,913	1,000	23/31	G025050
114	199	Silsean	Wicklow Mountains	Leinster	Wicklow	698	43	2,290	141	1,600	56	O023056
115	88	Bencollaghduff	Twelve Bens	Connacht	Galway	696	191	2,283	627	1,300	37	L798530
116	22	Keeper Hill	Keeper Hill	Munster	Tipperary	694	627	2,277	2,057	2,100	59	R823664
117	24	The Paps East	Derrynasaggart Mountains	Munster	Kerry	694	623	2,277	2,044	800	79	W134855
118	148	Ben Creggan	Ben Gorm Mountains	Connacht	Mayo	693	88	2,274	289	500	37	L857666
119	127	Caoinkeen	Shehy Mountains	Munster	Cork / Kerry	692	107	2,270	351	1,900	85	W010646
120	211	Beann NE Top	Dunkerron Mountains	Munster	Kerry	692	37	2,270	121	800	78	V730771
121	187	Knockaterriff	Galty Mountains	Munster	Limerick	692	51	2,269	168	700	74	R848216
122	91	Binn Bhraoin	Twelve Bens	Connacht	Galway	691	186	2,267	610	500	37	L783515
123	32	Knocknadobar	Iveragh NW	Munster	Kerry	690	565	2,264	1,854	1,100	83	V506845
124	128	The Paps West	Derrynasaggart Mountains	Munster	Kerry	690	106	2,264	348	800	79	W125855
125	241	Benleagh	Wicklow Mountains	Leinster	Wicklow	689	24	2,260	79	1,200	56	T038942
126	12	Croaghaun	Achill	Connacht	Mayo	688	688	2,257	2,257	700	22/30	F559061
127	159	Ben Creggan South Top	Ben Gorm Mountains	Munster	Mayo	687	72	2,254	236	500	37	L858661
128	172	Corranabinnia SW Top	Nephin Beg Range	Connacht	Mayo	687	62	2,254	203	800	30	F897026
129	163	War Hill	Wicklow Mountains	Leinster	Wicklow	686	71	2,251	233	1,400	56	O169113
130	47	Hungry Hill	Caha Mountains	Munster	Cork	685	400	2,247	1,312	1,800	84	V761497
131	96	Knockmoyle	Dunkerron Mountains	Munster	Kerry	684	169	2,244	554	1,200	78/83	V665749
132	181	Tomaneena	Wicklow Mountains	Leinster	Wicklow	682	54	2,239	177	1,900	56	T063982
133	25	Maumtrasna	Partry Mountains	Connacht	Mayo	682	607	2,238	1,991	1,800	38	L961637
134	168	Carrigvore	Wicklow Mountains	Leinster	Wicklow	682	67	2,238	220	1,900	56	O123102
135	55	Caherbarnagh	Derrynasaggart Mountains	Munster	Cork	681	361	2,234	1,184	600	79	W192871
136	124	Slieve Meelmore	Mourne Mountains	Ulster	Down	680	109	2,231	358	800	29	J306287
137	237	Binn Bhraoin Central Top	Twelve Bens	Connacht	Galway	680	25	2,231	82	400	37	L781520
138	228	Knockaterriff Beg	Galty Mountains	Munster	Limerick	679	28	2,229	91	700	74	R844222
139	105	Colly	Glenbeigh Horseshoe	Munster	Kerry	679	144	2,228	472	1,100	78/83	V650807
140	17	Sawel	Sperrin Mountains	Ulster	Londonderry / Tyrone	678	657	2,224	2,156	1,800	13	H618973
141	46	Slieve Snaght	Derryveagh Mountains	Ulster	Donegal	678	403	2,224	1,322	900	1	B924148
142	184	Slieve Binnian North Top	Mourne Mountains	Ulster	Down	678	53	2,224	174	300	29	J317245
143	185	Knocksheegowna	Comeragh Mountains	Munster	Waterford	678	53	2,224	174	1,500	75	S277165
144	267	Camaderry South East Top	Wicklow Mountains	Leinster	Wicklow	677	15	2,222	49	1,100	56	T090973
145	114	Binn Doire Chláir	Twelve Bens	Connacht	Galway	677	129	2,221	423	1,200	37	L815510
146	134	Knocknagantee	Dunkerron Mountains	Munster	Kerry	676	101	2,218	331	1,200	78/83	V668729
147	64	An Bheann Mhór	Dunkerron Mountains	Munster	Kerry	675	290	2,214	950	500	83	V594683
148	35	Croaghgorm	Bluestack Mountains	Ulster	Donegal	674	541	2,211	1,775	1,000	11	G948896
149	263	Binn Bhraoin North Top	Twelve Bens	Connacht	Galway	674	16	2,211	52	400	37	L784522
150	255	Beann na Stiocairí	Dunkerron Mountains	Munster	Kerry	673	20	2,208	65	500	83	V599682
151	30	Slievemore	Achill	Connacht	Mayo	671	582	2,201	1,909	3,200	22/30	F650086
152	87	Lavagh More	Bluestack Mountains	Ulster	Donegal	671	193	2,201	633	1,100	11	G935910
153	69	Slievanea NE Top	Central Dingle	Munster	Kerry	671	265	2,200	869	1,000	70	Q515064
154	100	Slieve Muck	Mourne Mountains	Ulster	Down	670	155	2,199	510	1,200	29	J281250
155	268	Slieve Binnian North Tor	Mourne Mountains	Ulster	Down	670	15	2,198	49	300	29	J320246
156	245	Caherbarnagh NW Top	Derrynasaggart Mountains	Munster	Cork	668	23	2,192	75	600	79	W188876
157	246	Tonelagee NE Top	Wicklow Mountains	Leinster	Wicklow	668	23	2,192	75	1,100	56	O095018
158	39	Muckish	Derryveagh Mountains	Ulster	Donegal	667	523	2,189	1,716	3,200	2	C004287
159	58	Binn Bhriocáin	Maamturks	Connacht	Galway	667	322	2,188	1,056	600	37	L856551
160	106	An Corrán	Dunkerron Mountains	Munster	Kerry	667	142	2,188	466	900	78	V697737
161	103	Knocknafallia	Knockmealdown Mountains	Munster	Waterford	667	153	2,187	502	1,200	74	S090075
162	119	Coomura Mountain	Dunkerron Mountains	Munster	Kerry	666	111	2,185	364	1,200	78/83	V677752
163	31	Cuilcagh	Cuilcagh Mountains	Ulster	Cavan / Fermanagh	665	570	2,182	1,870	2,600	26	H123281
164	146	Mullaghnarakill	Glenbeigh Horseshoe	Munster	Kerry	665	90	2,182	295	1,200	78/83	V601850
165	79	Croaghanmoira	Wicklow Mountains	Leinster	Wicklow	664	209	2,178	686	1,000	62	T099865
166	85	Binn Gabhar	Twelve Bens	Connacht	Galway	664	196	2,178	643	900	37	L783507
167	203	Croaghaun SW Top	Achill	Connacht	Mayo	664	39	2,178	128	700	22/30	F554058
168	178	Stumpa Dúloigh SW Top	Dunkerron Mountains	Munster	Kerry	663	58	2,175	190	1,000	78	V778789
169	205	Camenabologue SE Top	Wicklow Mountains	Leinster	Wicklow	663	38	2,175	125	1,200	56	T037954
170	117	Sugarloaf Hill	Knockmealdown Mountains	Munster	Tipperary / Waterford	663	118	2,174	386	2,100	74	S040105
171	44	Binn Mhór	Maamturks	Connacht	Galway	661	406	2,169	1,332	700	44	L918494
172	132	Mullacor	Wicklow Mountains	Leinster	Wicklow	661	102	2,169	335	1,600	56	T092939
173	115	Beenmore	Glenbeigh Horseshoe	Munster	Kerry	660	125	2,165	410	1,200	83	V596867
174	220	Binn idir an dá Log SE Top	Maamturks	Connacht	Galway	659	31	2,162	102	600	37	L894526
175	51	Knockowen	Caha Mountains	Munster	Cork / Kerry	658	373	2,159	1,224	1,400	84	V809554
176	160	Beann SW Top	Dunkerron Mountains	Munster	Kerry	657	72	2,156	236	800	78	V718760
177	219	Mount Leinster East Top	Blackstairs Mountains	Leinster	Wexford	657	32	2,154	106	1,800	68	S844528
178	112	Chimney Rock Mountain	Mourne Mountains	Ulster	Down	656	131	2,152	430	1,400	29	J364257
179	173	Knocknagnauv	Knockmealdown Mountains	Munster	Tipperary / Waterford	655	60	2,149	197	1,500	74	S081083
180	176	Cnoc na dTarbh	MacGillycuddy's Reeks	Munster	Kerry	655	60	2,149	197	600	78	V862850
181	137	Cove Mountain	Mourne Mountains	Ulster	Down	655	100	2,148	327	600	29	J337271
182	93	Muckanaght	Twelve Bens	Connacht	Galway	654	179	2,146	587	1,000	37	L767541
183	223	Dromderalough NE Top	Mangerton Mountains	Munster	Kerry	654	29	2,146	95	1,000	78	V969796
184	56	Keadeen Mountain	Wicklow Mountains	Leinster	Wicklow	653	334	2,142	1,096	1,400	62	S954897
185	59	Knockshanahullion	Knockmealdown Mountains	Munster	Tipperary	652	317	2,139	1,040	2,000	74	R999104
186	139	Lugduff	Wicklow Mountains	Leinster	Wicklow	652	97	2,139	318	1,000	56	T072953
187	229	Ballineddan Mountain	Wicklow Mountains	Leinster	Wicklow	652	27	2,139	89	1,500	56	T002908
188	49	Dooish	Derryveagh Mountains	Ulster	Donegal	652	377	2,137	1,235	800	6	B982210
189	193	Been Hill	Glenbeigh Horseshoe	Munster	Kerry	651	46	2,136	151	1,200	83	V590854
190	48	Crohane	Mangerton Mountains	Munster	Kerry	650	385	2,133	1,263	1,100	79	W050829
191	143	Lavagh Beg	Bluestack Mountains	Ulster	Donegal	650	93	2,133	305	1,100	11	G926915
192	195	Dromderalough	Mangerton Mountains	Munster	Kerry	650	45	2,133	148	500	78	V961790
193	269	Hag's Tooth	MacGillycuddy's Reeks	Munster	Kerry	650	15	2,133	49	700	78	V809850
194	70	Mullaghanish	Derrynasaggart Mountains	Munster	Cork / Kerry	649	264	2,129	866	1,500	79	W215818
195	153	An Cnapán Mór	Central Dingle	Munster	Kerry	649	81	2,129	266	1,400	70	Q522045
196	131	Coomcallee	Dunkerron Mountains	Munster	Kerry	649	104	2,129	341	1,700	83	V624677
197	142	Seahan	Dublin Mountains	Leinster	Dublin	647	94	2,124	308	1,000	56	O081197
198	33	Truskmore	Dartry Mountains	Connacht	Sligo	647	560	2,123	1,837	500	16	G759473
199	68	Devilsmother	Partry Mountains	Connacht	Galway / Mayo	645	280	2,116	919	800	37	L916624
200	80	Coomnadiha	Caha Mountains	Munster	Kerry	644	209	2,113	686	1,500	85	V847600
201	43	Musheramore	Boggeragh Mountains	Munster	Cork	643	439	2,109	1,440	2,300	79	W329850
202	118	Tonduff	Wicklow Mountains	Leinster	Wicklow	642	117	2,106	384	1,200	56	O159137
203	156	Ardnageer	Bluestack Mountains	Ulster	Donegal	642	77	2,106	253	800	11	G969909
204	95	Cnoc na Bánóige	Central Dingle	Munster	Kerry	642	176	2,105	577	1,000	70	Q548048
205	94	Cush	Galty Mountains	Munster	Tipperary	641	176	2,104	578	2,100	74	R894262
206	45	Knocklomena	Dunkerron Mountains	Munster	Kerry	641	406	2,103	1,332	1,700	78	V797766
207	75	Scarr	Wicklow Mountains	Leinster	Wicklow	641	231	2,103	758	900	56	O133018
208	157	Croaghbane	Bluestack Mountains	Ulster	Donegal	641	76	2,103	249	900	11	G978911
209	215	Drung Hill	Glenbeigh Horseshoe	Munster	Kerry	640	35	2,100	115	1,200	78/83	V602878
210	270	Slieve Corragh	Mourne Mountains	Ulster	Down	640	15	2,100	49	800	29	J337286
211	271	Binn Mhór NE Top	Maamturks	Connacht	Galway	640	15	2,100	49	500	44	L924495
212	57	Cnoc na gCapall	Dunkerron Mountains	Munster	Kerry	639	334	2,096	1,096	800	78	V834767
213	171	Beann South Top	Dunkerron Mountains	Munster	Kerry	639	64	2,096	210	900	78	V728755
214	71	Eagle Mountain	Mourne Mountains	Ulster	Down	638	263	2,093	863	500	29	J245230
215	190	Binn Fraoigh	Twelve Bens	Connacht	Galway	638	48	2,093	157	900	37	L778544
216	107	Knocknamanagh	Shehy Mountains	Munster	Kerry	637	139	2,090	456	1,600	85	V990661
217	252	Lugduff SE Top	Wicklow Mountains	Leinster	Wicklow	637	22	2,090	72	1,000	56	T081949
218	239	Beann Far SW Top	Dunkerron Mountains	Munster	Kerry	636	24	2,087	79	800	78	V713754
219	120	Lobawn	Wicklow Mountains	Leinster	Wicklow	636	111	2,087	364	1,500	56	S978978
220	164	Coomnacronia	Dunkerron Mountains	Munster	Kerry	636	71	2,087	233	1,200	78	V680734
221	81	Mullaghclogha	Sperrin Mountains	Ulster	Tyrone	635	207	2,083	679	1,200	13	H556958
222	109	Kells Mountain	Iveragh NW	Munster	Kerry	633	138	2,077	453	800	83	V529858
223	126	Binn Chaonaigh	Maamturks	Connacht	Galway	633	108	2,077	354	500	37	L900515
224	102	An Chailleach	Twelve Bens	Connacht	Galway	632	154	2,073	505	700	37	L756537
225	150	Boughil	Dunkerron Mountains	Munster	Kerry	631	86	2,070	282	800	78	V842765
226	141	Monabrack	Galty Mountains	Munster	Limerick	630	94	2,067	308	1,200	74	R859219
227	272	Slieve Binnian East Top	Mourne Mountains	Ulster	Down	630	15	2,067	49	600	29	J327232
228	212	Laghtshanaquilla	Galty Mountains	Munster	Tipperary	629	36	2,065	118	800	74	R951250
229	152	Knocknalougha	Knockmealdown Mountains	Munster	Tipperary / Waterford	629	84	2,064	276	1,500	74	S019100
230	249	Slievanea	Central Dingle	Munster	Kerry	629	22	2,063	73	1,000	70	Q508057
231	108	Glennamong	Nephin Beg Range	Connacht	Mayo	628	139	2,060	456	1,400	23/30	F913059
232	53	Nephin Beg	Nephin Beg Range	Connacht	Mayo	627	365	2,057	1,198	2,000	23	F932102
233	62	Mullaghaneany	Sperrin Mountains	Ulster	Londonderry / Tyrone	627	302	2,057	991	1,200	13	H686986
234	221	Shanlieve	Mourne Mountains	Ulster	Down	626	31	2,054	102	500	29	J240227
235	254	Ardnageer SW Top	Bluestack Mountains	Ulster	Donegal	626	21	2,054	69	800	11	G963905
236	177	Knocknamanagh NE Top	Shehy Mountains	Munster	Kerry	625	60	2,051	197	1,000	85	W002673
237	78	An Scraig	Brandon Group	Munster	Kerry	623	218	2,044	715	900	70	Q460057
238	149	Mullach Glas	Maamturks	Connacht	Galway	622	87	2,041	285	500	45	L937493
239	76	Maulin	Caha Mountains	Munster	Cork	621	226	2,037	741	700	84	V713505
240	250	Seefin	Wicklow Mountains	Leinster	Wicklow	621	22	2,036	73	1,500	56	O074163
241	151	Meenard Mountain	Sperrin Mountains	Ulster	Londonderry / Tyrone	620	85	2,034	279	1,200	13	H673985
242	147	Dart Mountain	Sperrin Mountains	Ulster	Londonderry / Tyrone	619	89	2,031	292	1,200	13	H603964
243	54	Leenaun Hill	Maamturks	Connacht	Galway	618	363	2,028	1,191	1,500	37	L874593
244	225	Corrig Mountain	Dublin Mountains	Leinster	Dublin / Wicklow	617	28	2,025	92	1,000	56	O090194
245	130	Slieve Loughshannagh	Mourne Mountains	Ulster	Down	617	104	2,024	341	900	29	J294272
246	133	Coumaraglin Mountain	Comeragh Mountains	Munster	Waterford	617	102	2,024	335	2,700	75	S282043
247	26	Slieve Snaght	Inishowen	Ulster	Donegal	615	600	2,018	1,969	1,600	3	C424390
248	230	Kells Mountain East Top	Iveragh NW	Munster	Kerry	612	27	2,008	89	800	83	V537861
249	273	Binn Mhairg	Maamturks	Connacht	Galway	612	15	2,008	49	500	37	L902520
250	129	Tievebaun	Dartry Mountains	Connacht	Leitrim	611	106	2,005	348	2,700	16	G768498
251	196	Knockbrack	Mangerton Mountains	Munster	Kerry	610	45	2,001	148	1,300	78	V953779
252	200	Coombane	Central Dingle	Munster	Kerry	610	42	2,001	138	1,000	70	Q568092
253	77	Corcóg	Maamturks	Connacht	Galway	609	221	1,998	725	1,100	45	L952492
254	242	Beennabrack	Brandon Group	Munster	Kerry	609	24	1,996	77	900	70	Q469054
255	247	Stoompa East Top	Mangerton Mountains	Munster	Kerry	608	23	1,995	75	1,100	79	W018819
256	104	Cnoc na hUilleann	Maamturks	Connacht	Galway	607	152	1,991	499	800	37	L870537
257	186	Macklaun	Glenbeigh Horseshoe	Munster	Kerry	607	52	1,991	171	1,700	78/83	V660837
258	36	Croghan Kinsella	Wicklow Mountains	Leinster	Wexford / Wicklow	606	541	1,988	1,775	800	62	T130729
259	74	Carran	Shehy Mountains	Munster	Kerry	604	237	1,982	778	900	85	W052678
260	66	Lackabane	Caha Mountains	Munster	Kerry	603	288	1,978	945	1,000	84	V751537
261	206	Gullaba Hill	Shehy Mountains	Munster	Kerry	603	38	1,978	125	1,000	85	W005683
262	226	Binn Bhriocáin NE Top	Maamturks	Connacht	Galway	603	28	1,978	92	600	37	L862554
263	227	Baurtregaum Far NE Top	Slieve Mish	Munster	Kerry	603	28	1,978	92	1,600	71	Q768090
264	52	Aghla Beg (South)	Derryveagh Mountains	Ulster	Donegal	602	368	1,976	1,207	700	2	B965246
265	166	Black Hill	Wicklow Mountains	Leinster	Wicklow	602	67	1,976	220	2,300	56	O041090
266	182	Maumonght	Twelve Bens	Connacht	Galway	602	54	1,975	177	700	37	L749539
267	260	Knocknadobar North Top	Iveragh NW	Munster	Kerry	602	17	1,975	56	1,100	83	V500854
268	169	Knockeenatoung	Galty Mountains	Munster	Tipperary	601	66	1,973	218	1,500	74	R895219
269	232	Devilsmother Far North Top	Partry Mountains	Connacht	Mayo	601	26	1,972	85	1,100	37	L920643
270	110	Eskatarriff	Caha Mountains	Munster	Cork / Kerry	601	136	1,970	445	700	84	V736533
271	248	Lough Curra Mtn	Galty Mountains	Munster	Tipperary	600	23	1,970	75	1,000	74	R869242
272	101	Silver Hill	Bluestack Mountains	Ulster	Donegal	600	155	1,969	509	1,100	11	G906913
273	216	Castle Hill	Slieve Mish	Munster	Kerry	600	35	1,969	115	1,400	71	Q756063

== Lists of Irish hills ==
=== Carns ===
MountainViews and Database of British and Irish Hills recognise a list of 337 summits as Carns, having height above 100 m (328 ft) and below 400 m (1,312 ft).

=== Binnions ===
MountainViews and Database of British and Irish Hills recognise a list of 484 summits as Binnions, having prominence at least 100 m (328 ft) and height below 400 m (1,312 ft).

== List of Irish County and Provincial Tops ==
=== Provincial Tops ===
There are 4 Irish Provincial Tops, namely: Carrauntoohil, in Munster, Lugnaquilla in Leinster, Slieve Donard, in Ulster, and Mweelrea in Connacht.

- List of Irish counties by highest point, list of Irish Provincial Tops

=== County Tops ===
In addition, there are 27 Irish County Tops, as 10 counties share the same county top, namely: Galtymore for Limerick/Tipperary, Mount Leinster for Carlow/Wexford, Sawel for Londonderry/Tyrone, Cuilcagh for Cavan/Fermanagh, Arderin for Laois/Offaly.

- List of Irish counties by highest point, list of Irish County Tops

== Ranking of Irish mountains in Ireland and Britain ==
Whereas the MountainViews, Vandeleur-Lynam, and Arderin classifications are unique to Ireland, Irish mountains appear in other similar classifications that have been used in across Britain and Ireland.

=== Simms ===
The Britain and Ireland Simms classification (height over 600 m, and prominence above 30 m), is very similar to the Irish Arderin classification (height over 500 m, and prominence over 30 m). As of October 2018, the 2,754 Simms in Britain and Ireland, which include 224 Irish Simms (i.e. the Irish Arderins over 600 m), are ranked by height, and by prominence, on this table:

- List of mountains of the British Isles by height, for ranking by height and by prominence, of peaks that are Simms, with prominence over 30 metres (98 ft)

=== Hewitts ===
Irish Hewitts, which have largely been replaced by the metric Simms classification, are ranked against English and Welsh Hewitts on these tables:

- List of Hewitt mountains in England, Wales and Ireland, for ranking by height, of peaks that are Hewitts, with prominence over 30 metres (98 ft)

=== Marilyns ===
The popular Britain and Ireland Marilyn classification (any height, and prominence above 150 m), is a more severe prominence threshold than the Irish Mountainviews classification (height over 500 m, and prominence over 100 m). As of October 2018, the 2,011 Marilyns in Britain and Ireland, which include 454 Irish Marilyns (e.g. the amount is larger because Marilyns will take any height, as long as the peak meets the prominence threshold), are ranked by prominence, and by height, here (note that this list is commonly used to rank by prominence, as it includes any peak with prominence above 150 m):

- List of Marilyns in the British Isles, for ranking by height and by prominence, of peaks that are Marilyns, with prominence over 150 metres (492 ft)

=== P600s ===
The Britain and Ireland P600 classification require a prominence above 600 m (e.g. and by definition, the height must, therefore, be above 600 m), and are thus called the "Majors". As of October 2018, the 120 P600s in Britain and Ireland, which include 26 Irish P600s, are ranked by height here:

- List of P600 mountains in the British Isles, for ranking by height and by prominence, of peaks that are P600s, with prominence over 600 metres (1,969 ft)

=== Furths ===
Finally, the Scottish Furth classification is for mountains that the Scottish Mountaineering Club ("SMC") identify as meeting the classification for a Scottish Munro, however, they are outside (e.g. they are "furth") of Scotland. As of October 2018, the 34 Furths in Britain and Ireland, which includes 13 Irish Furths, are ranked by height here:

- List of Furth mountains in the British Isles, for ranking by height, or peaks that are considered Furths by the SMC

== List by province by range ==
Provinces of Ireland

=== Munster ===
- An Triúr Deirfiúr (The Three Sisters) – County Kerry
- Ballyhoura Mountains – Counties Cork and Limerick
  - Carron Mountain
  - Seefin (Ballyhoura Mountains)
- Boggeragh Mountains – County Cork
  - Musheramore
- Caha Mountains – County Cork
  - Hungry Hill
  - Sugarloaf (Cork)
- Comeragh Mountains – County Waterford
  - Fauscoum
- Derrynasaggart Mountains – County Cork
  - Mullaghanish
- Devil's Bit – County Tipperary
- Dingle Peninsula – County Kerry
  - Mount Brandon (952 m, 3,123 ft)
  - Beenoskee
  - Mount Eagle
- Galty Mountains – Counties Cork, Limerick, Tipperary
  - Galtymore (917 m, 3,009 ft)
  - Temple Hill
- Geokaun Mountain – County Kerry
- Glanaruddery Mountains – County Kerry
- Ivereagh Peninsula – County Kerry
  - Bentee
  - Stumpa Dúloigh
  - Mullaghanattin
  - Broaghnabinnia
- Knockmealdown Mountains – Counties Tipperary and Waterford
  - Knockmealdown
  - Sugarloaf Hill (Knockmealdowns)
- MacGillycuddy's Reeks – County Kerry
  - Carrauntoohil (1,038.6 m, 3,407 ft)
  - Beenkeragh (1,008 m, 3,307 ft)
  - Caher (1,000 m, 3,281 ft)
  - Knocknapeasta (988 m, 3,241 ft)
- Mangerton Group also known as Mangerton Mountains – County Kerry
  - Mangerton Mountain (843 m, 2,766 ft)
  - Torc Mountain (535 m, 1,755 ft)
- Mount Gabriel – County Cork
- Mullaghareirk Mountains – Counties Cork and Limerick
- Purple Mountain – County Kerry
- Shehy Mountains – Counties Cork and Kerry
  - Knockboy
- Silvermine Mountains – Counties Tipperary and Limerick
  - Slievekimalta (Keeper Hill)
- Paps of Anu (670 m, 2,198 ft) – County Kerry
- Slieve Aughty – County Clare
- Slieve Callan – County Clare
- Slieve Mish Mountains – County Kerry
  - Baurtregaum (851 m, 2,792 ft)
  - Caherconree (835 m, 2,740 ft)
- Slieve Miskish Mountains – County Cork
  - Knockoura
- Slieveardagh Hills (340 m, 1,115 ft) – Counties Tipperary and Kilkenny
- Slievenamon (719 m, 2,359 ft) – County Tipperary
- Stack's Mountains – County Kerry

=== Leinster ===
- Blackstairs Mountains – Counties Carlow and Wexford
  - Black Rock Mountain (536 m, 1,759 ft)
  - Blackstairs Mountain (735 m, 2,411 ft)
  - Croaghaun (455 m, 1,493 ft)
  - Mount Leinster (795 m, 2,608 ft)
- Brandon Hill (515 m, 1,690 ft) – County Kilkenny
- Carn Clonhugh also known as Corn Hill – County Longford
- Cooley Mountains – County Louth
  - Clermont Carn
  - Slieve Foy (589 m, 1,932 ft)
- Coppanagh – County Kilkenny
- Croghan Hill (234 m, 768 ft) – County Offaly
- Dalkey Hill (140 m, 459 ft) – County Dun Laoghaire-Rathdown (old County Dublin)
- Faughan Hill – County Meath
- Hill of Allen (206 m, 676 ft) – County Kildare
- Hill of Ben – County Westmeath
- Hill of Tara – County Meath
- Hill of Uisneach (182 m, 597 ft) – County Westmeath
- Hill of Ward – County Meath
- Killiney Hill (153 m, 502 ft) – County Dun Laoghaire-Rathdown (old County Dublin)
- Knockeyon – County Westmeath
- Mount Alto – County Kilkenny
- Mullaghmeen – County Westmeath
- Naul Hills (122 m, 400 ft)
- Slieveardagh Hills – County Kilkenny
  - Clomantagh Hill
  - Knocknamuck
- Shielmartin Hill (163 m, 535 ft) – County Fingal (old County Dublin)
- Slieve Bloom Mountains – Counties Laois and Offaly
  - Arderin (527 m, 1,729 ft)
  - Barcam
  - Baunreaghcong (509 m, 1,670 ft)
  - Carroll's Hill
  - Castleconor
  - Farbreague
  - Garraunbaun
  - Ridge of Capard
  - Stillbrook Hill (514 m, 1,686 ft)
  - Wolftrap Mountain
- Slieveboy (420 m, 1,378 ft) – County Wexford
- Slieve na Calliagh – County Meath
- Wicklow Mountains
  - Annagh Hill
  - Camaderry (699 m, 2,293 ft)
  - Camenabologue
  - Carrick Mountain
  - Church Mountain also known as Slieve Gad (543 m, 1,781 ft)
  - Cloghernagh (800 m, 2,625 ft)
  - Conavalla
  - Corrigasleggaun
  - Croghan Mountain
  - Cupidstown Hill (379 m, 1,243 ft)
  - Djouce (725 m, 2,379 ft)
  - Duff Hill (720 m, 2,362 ft)
  - Gravale (718 m, 2,356 ft)
  - Great Sugar Loaf (501 m, 1,644 ft)
  - Keadeen Mountain
  - Kilmashogue
  - Kippure (757 m, 2,484 ft)
  - Larch Hill
  - Little Sugar Loaf also known as Giltspur Mountain (300 m, 984 ft)
  - Lobawn
  - Luggala also known as Fancy Mountain
  - Lugnaquilla (924 m, 3,031 ft)
  - Maulin
  - Montpelier Hill (383 m, 1,257 ft)
  - Mullacor
  - Mullaghcleevaun (849 m, 2,785 ft)
  - Seefingan
  - Slievemaan (759 m, 2,490 ft)
  - Sugarloaf (West Wicklow)
  - Table Mountain
  - Tibradden Mountain (467 m, 1,532 ft)
  - Tonelagee (817 m, 2,680 ft)
  - Two Rock (536 m, 1,759 ft) and Three Rock (450 m, 1,476 ft)

=== Ulster ===
- Antrim Hills* – County Antrim
  - Slemish
  - Tievebulliagh
  - Trostan
- Antrim Plateau* – County Londonderry
  - Binevenagh
  - Donald's Hill
- Belfast Hills* – County Antrim
  - Black Mountain
  - Cavehill
  - Divis
- Lisburn* – County Antrim
  - White Mountain
- Belmore Mountain* – County Fermanagh
- Bluestack Mountains also known as Croaghgorms – County Donegal
  - Croaghgorm
- Cuilcagh* and Benaughlin* – Counties Fermanagh and Cavan
- Derryveagh Mountains – County Donegal
  - Aghla Beg
  - Aghla More
  - Ardloughnabrackbaddy
  - Crocknalaragagh
  - Errigal
  - Mackoght
  - Muckish
- Inishowen
  - Slieve Snaght
- Loughermore* – County Londonderry
- Mourne Mountains* – County Down
  - Slieve Bearnagh
  - Slieve Binnian
  - Slieve Commedagh
  - Slieve Donard (850 m, 2,789 ft)
  - Slieve Muck
  - Ben Crom
- Ouley Hill* – County Down
- Slieve Beagh* – Counties Fermanagh, Tyrone, Monaghan
- Slieve Croob* – County Down
- Slieve Gullion* – County Armagh
- Sliabh gCuircin* Camlough Mountain (423 m, 1,388 ft) – County Armagh
- Slieve Rushen* – Counties Fermanagh and Cavan
- Southwest Donegal – County Donegal
  - Slieve League
- Sperrins* – Counties Londonderry and Tyrone
  - Benbradagh
  - Dart Mountain
  - Mullaghcarn
  - Mullaghmore
  - Sawel Mountain
  - Slieve Gallion

=== Connacht ===
- Achill Island – County Mayo
  - Croaghaun (688 m, 2,257 ft)
  - Slievemore (671 m, 2,201 ft)
- Ben Gorm – County Mayo
- Croagh Patrick (764 m, 2,507 ft) – County Mayo
- Clare Island – County Mayo
  - Knockmore (462 m, 1,516 ft)
- Curlew Mountains – Counties Sligo and Roscommon
- Dartry Mountains – Counties Sligo and Leitrim
  - Benbulben
  - Truskmore
- Knocknarea – County Sligo
- Maumturks – County Galway
  - Letterbreckaun
  - Binn idir an dá Log (Benadolug)
  - Binn Mhór
  - Corcogemore
  - Lackavrea
- Mweelrea (814 m, 2,671 ft) – County Mayo
- Nephin Beg Range – County Mayo
  - Nephin (806 m, 2,644 ft)
  - Nephin Beg (627 m, 2,057 ft)
  - Slieve Carr (721 m, 2,365 ft)
- Ox Mountains – County Sligo
  - Knockalongy
  - Knocknashee
- Partry Mountains – Counties Mayo and Galway
  - Devilsmother (645 m, 2,116 ft)
  - Maumtrasna – County Mayo
- Sheeffry Range – County Mayo
  - Barrclashcame
- Twelve Bens – County Galway
  - Benbaun
  - Bencorr
  - Bencollaghduff
- Errisbeg
- Diamond Hill
- Tully Mountain

== See also ==
- List of long-distance trails in the Republic of Ireland
- List of Irish counties by highest point
- List of mountains of the British Isles by height
- List of mountains of the British Isles by prominence
- List of Furths in the British Isles
- List of Marilyns in the British Isles
- List of P600 mountains in the British Isles
- List of Hewitt mountains in England, Wales and Ireland
- List of mountain lists
- Lists of mountains and hills in the British Isles
