= Carrignagower =

Mountain in County Waterford, Ireland

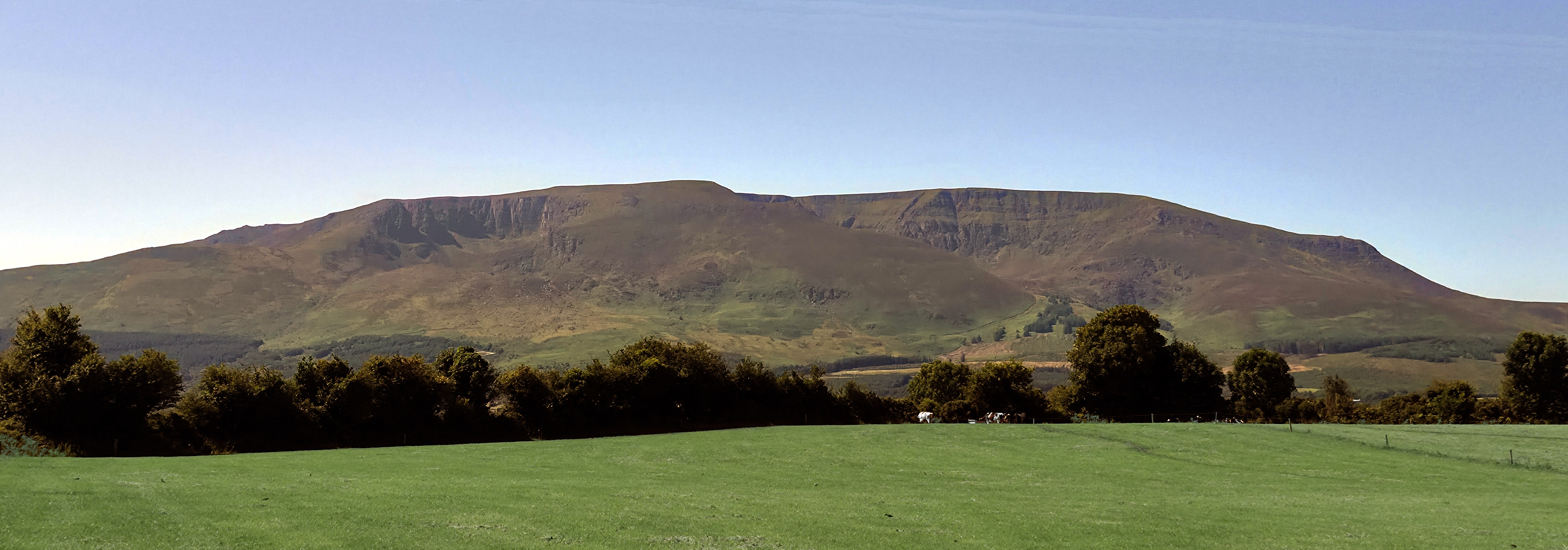

Highest point
- Elevation: 767 m (2,516 ft)
- Listing: P600, Marilyn, Hewitt
- Coordinates: 52°14′32″N 7°32′17″W

Naming
- Native name: Carraig na nGabhar

Geography
- Location within island of Ireland
- Location: County Waterford, Ireland
- Parent range: Comeragh Mountains
- OSI/OSNI grid: S317105
- Topo map: OSi Discovery 75

Carrignagower (Irish: Carraig na nGabhar meaning 'rock of the goats') is a mountain peak (767m) north of Coumshingaun and Fauscoum in the Comeragh Mountains.

It is the 64th highest peak in Ireland and the 2nd highest peak in the Comeraghs. Carrignagower overlooks Coumduala lough and the Coum Iarthar lakes.

== See also ==
- Lists of mountains in Ireland
- List of Hewitt mountains in England, Wales and Ireland
