= Coomacarrea =

Mountain in Mayo, Ireland

- Com an Charria
- Location within island of Ireland

Highest point
- Elevation: 772 m (2,533 ft)
- Prominence: 457 m (1,499 ft)
- Listing: Hewitt, Marilyn
- Coordinates: 51°58′41″N 10°1′18″W

Naming
- English translation: hollow of the stag
- Language of name: Irish

Geography
- Location: County Kerry, Ireland
- Parent range: Glenbeigh Horseshoe

Coomacarrea (from Irish Com an Charria, meaning 'hollow of the stag') is a 772 m (2,533 ft) mountain in County Kerry, Ireland.

== Geography ==
The mountain is part of the Mountains of the Iveragh Peninsula and is the highest peak of the Glenbeigh Horseshoe.

== See also ==
- Lists of mountains in Ireland
- List of mountains of the British Isles by height
- List of Marilyns in the British Isles
- List of Hewitt mountains in England, Wales and Ireland
