= Lyracappul =

Mountain within the Galtee Mountains, County Limerick, Ireland

- Ladhar an Chapaill
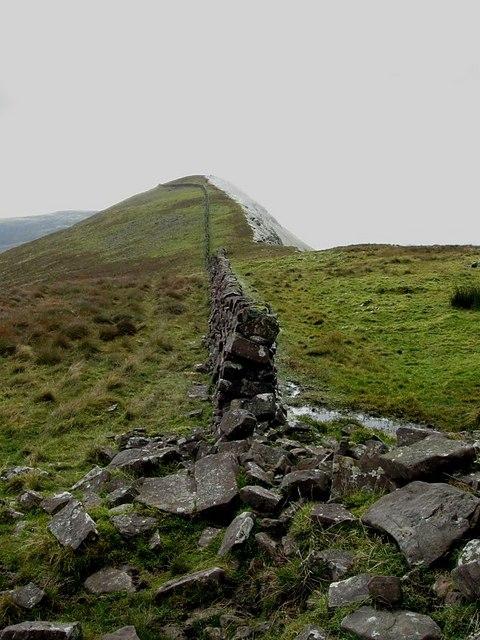
- The wall on the summit

Highest point
- Elevation: 825 m (2,707 ft)
- Prominence: 100 m (330 ft)
- Listing: Hewitt, Marilyn
- Coordinates: 52.360427°N 8.227342°W

Naming
- English translation: fork/confluence of the horse
- Language of name: Irish

Geography
- Location within island of Ireland
- Location: County Limerick, Ireland
- Parent range: Galtee Mountains
- OSI/OSNI grid: R878238
- Topo map: OSi Discovery 74

Lyracappul (Irish: Ladhar an Chapaill, meaning 'fork/confluence of the horse') is a mountain in County Limerick in Ireland. At a height of 825 metres (2,707 ft) it is the second highest of the Galtee Mountains and the 29th highest peak in Ireland. Lyracappul is the second highest point in County Limerick.

== See also ==
- Lists of mountains in Ireland
- List of mountains of the British Isles by height
- List of Marilyns in the British Isles
- List of Hewitt mountains in England, Wales and Ireland
