= Sugarloaf Hill (Knockmealdowns) =

Mountain in Tipperary/Waterford, Ireland

Coordinates: 52.246°N 7.942°W

- Cnoc na Binne
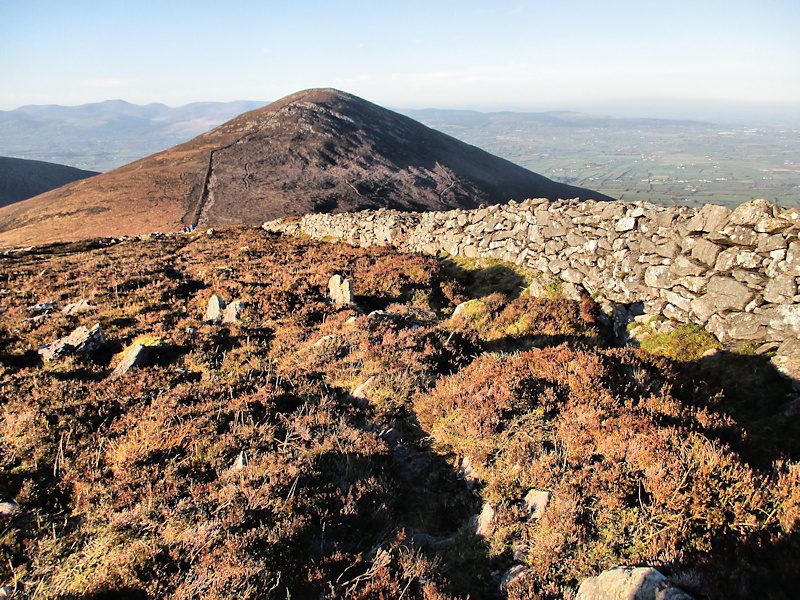
- View of Sugarloaf Hill from neighbouring Knockacomortish

Highest point
- Elevation: 663 m (2,175 ft)
- Prominence: 118 m (387 ft)
- Listing: Hewitt

Geography
- Location within island of Ireland
- Location: County Tipperary / County Waterford, Ireland
- Parent range: Knockmealdown Mountains
- OSI/OSNI grid: S039105
- Topo map: OSi Discovery 74

Sugarloaf Hill (Irish: Cnoc na Binne) is a mountain peak located in the Knockmealdown Mountains on the border between County Tipperary and County Waterford.

== See also ==
- List of mountains in Ireland
- Sugarloaf (mountain)
