= Knocknafallia =

Mountain in County Waterford, Ireland

- Cnoc na Faille
- Location within island of Ireland

Highest point
- Elevation: 668 m (2,192 ft)
- Prominence: 499 m (1,637 ft)
- Listing: Hewitt, Marilyn
- Coordinates: 52°13′11″N 7°52′18″W

Naming
- English translation: hill of the cliff
- Language of name: Irish

Geography
- Location: County Waterford, Ireland
- Parent range: Knockmealdown Mountains

Knocknafallia (from Irish Cnoc na Faille, meaning 'hill of the cliff') is a 668 m (2,192 ft) high mountain in County Waterford, Ireland.

== Geography ==
Knocknafallia is part of the Knockmealdown Mountains and is the third highest mountain there.

== See also ==
- Lists of mountains in Ireland
- List of mountains of the British Isles by height
- List of Marilyns in the British Isles
- List of Hewitt mountains in England, Wales and Ireland
