= Dart Mountain =

Mountain in Northern Ireland

Coordinates: 54°48′40″N 7°03′50″W

Dart Mountain (from Irish: An Dairt, meaning "The Lump"), on the boundary between County Londonderry and County Tyrone, is the second highest peak in the Sperrin Mountains in Northern Ireland. The summit is 619 metres (2,031 ft) high. It is the 3511th highest peak in the British Isles and the 246th tallest in Ireland.
