= List of mountain peaks of the Wicklow Mountains =

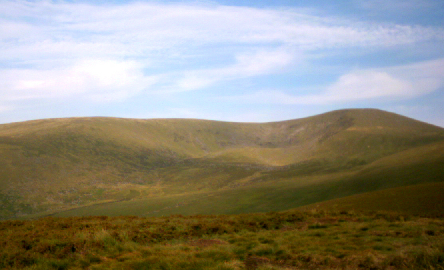
1 - Lugnaquilla

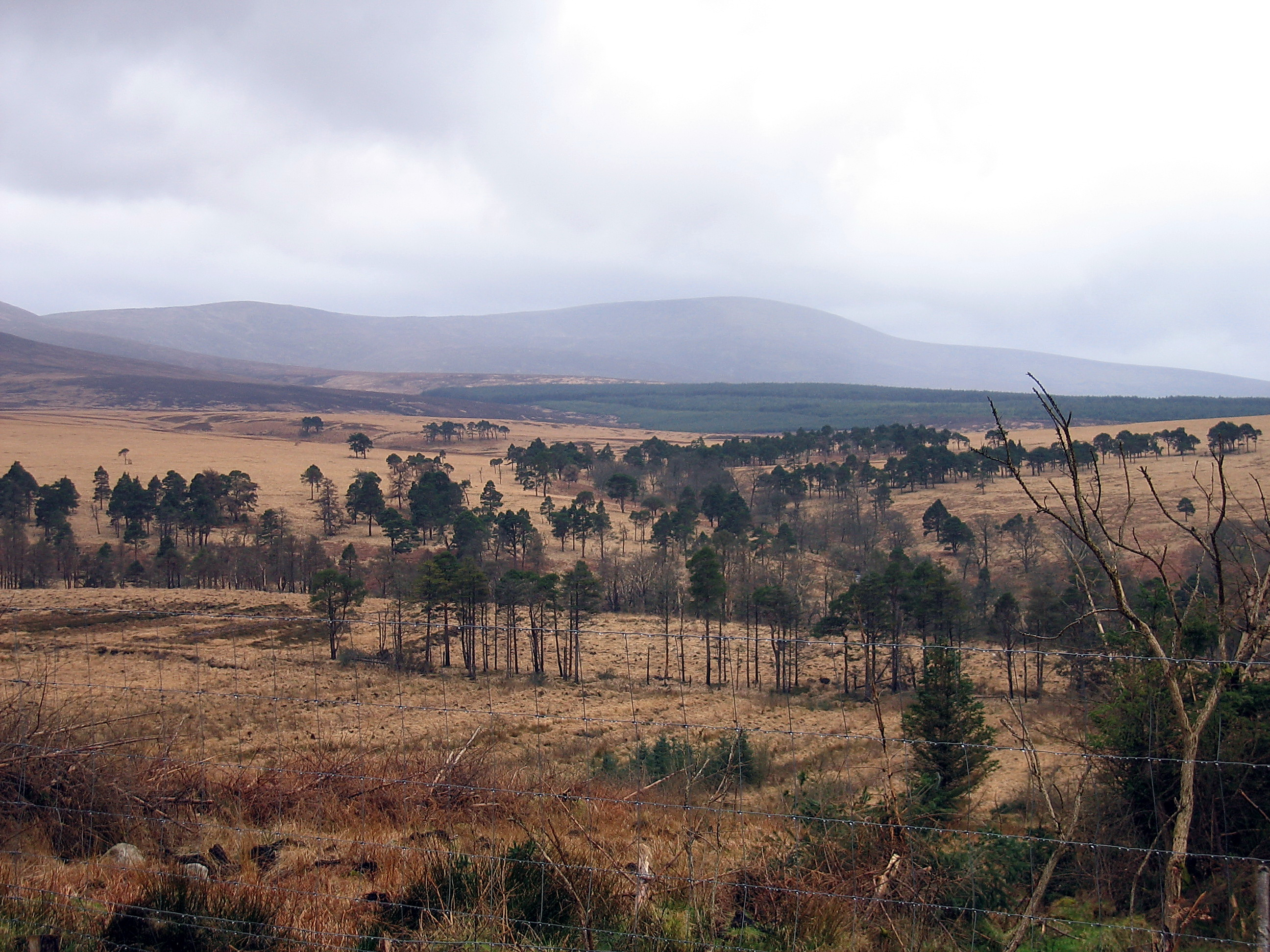
2 - Mullaghcleevaun

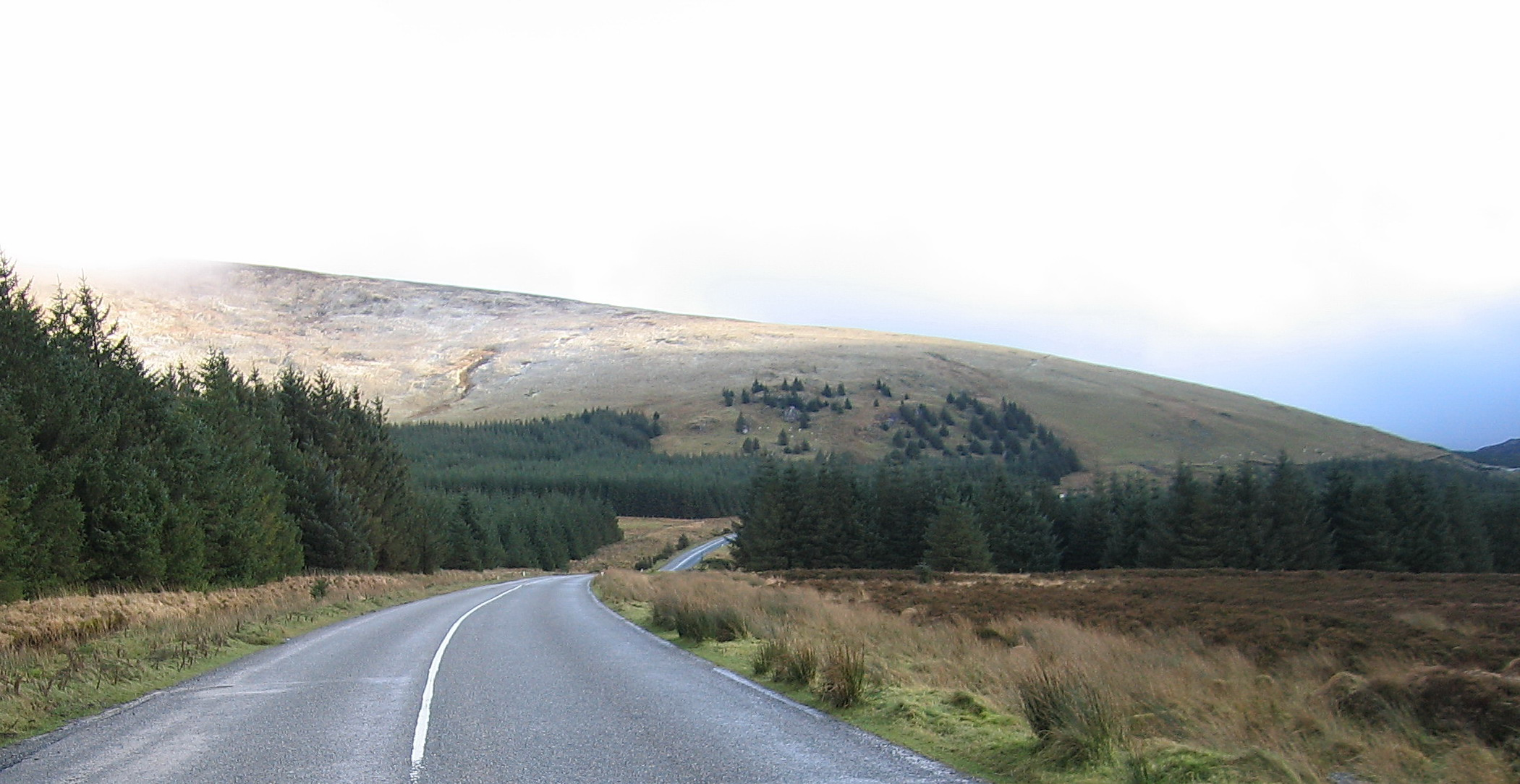
3 - Tonelagee

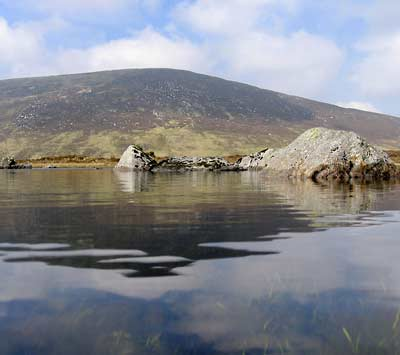
4 - Cloghernagh

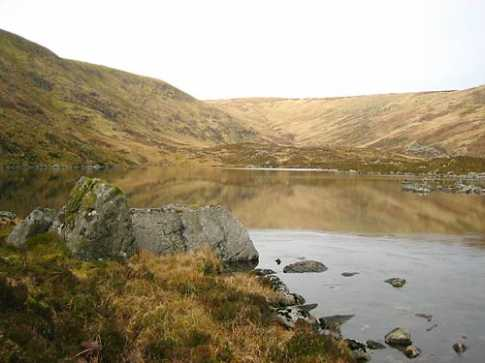
5 - Corrigasleggaun

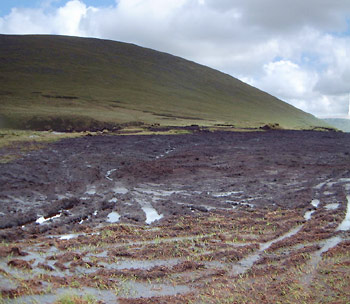
6 - Slievemaan

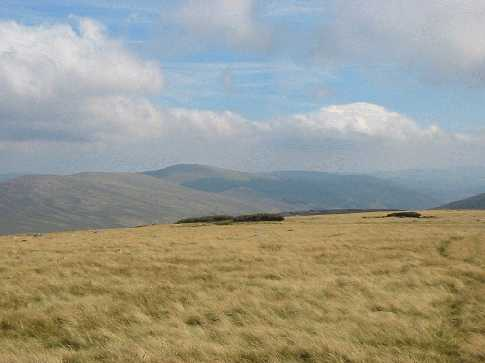
7 - Camenabologue

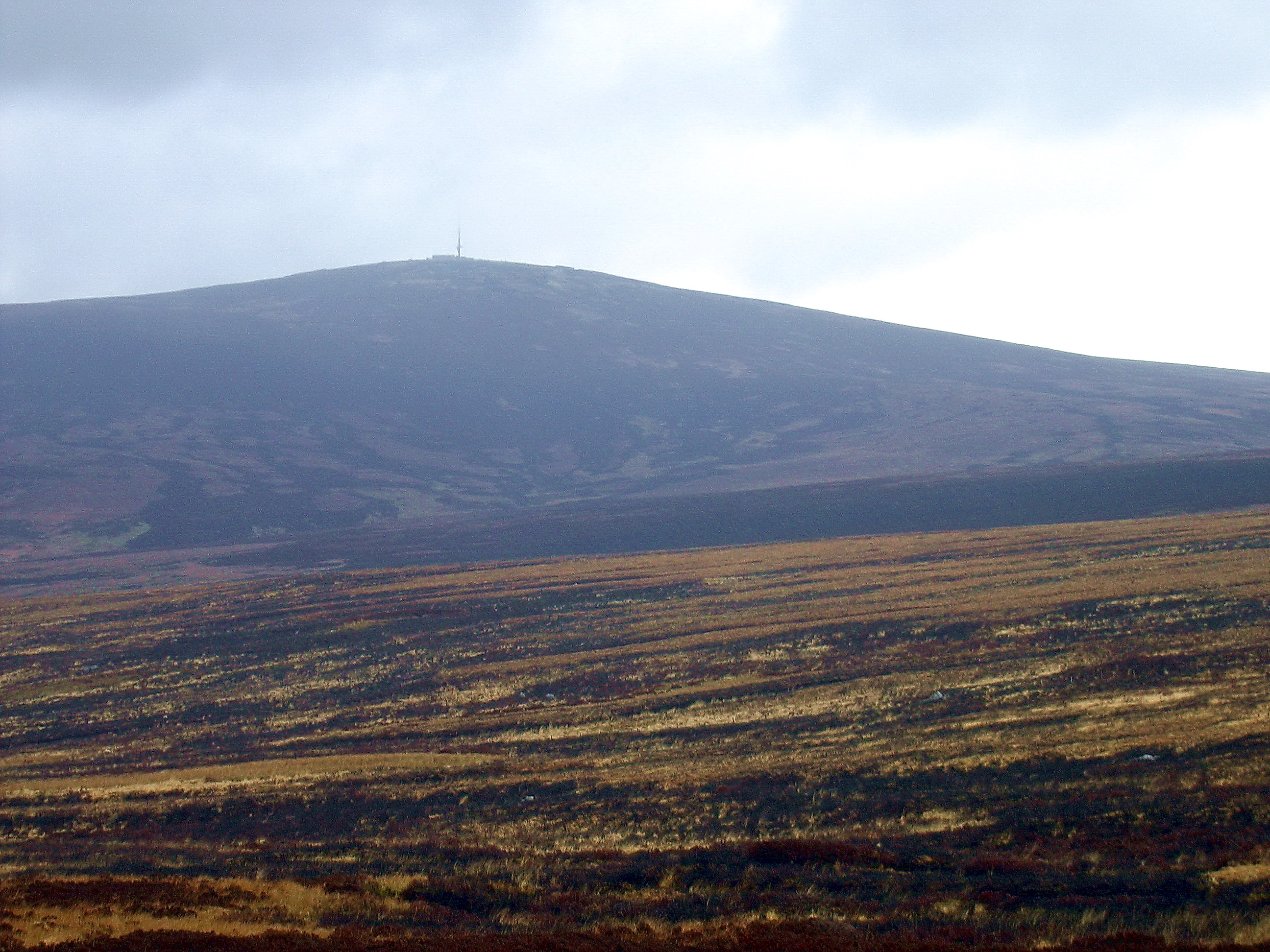
8 - Kippure

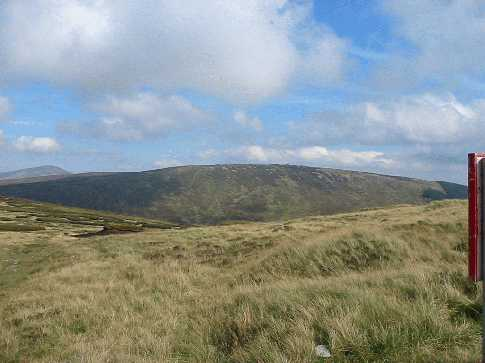
9 - Conavalla

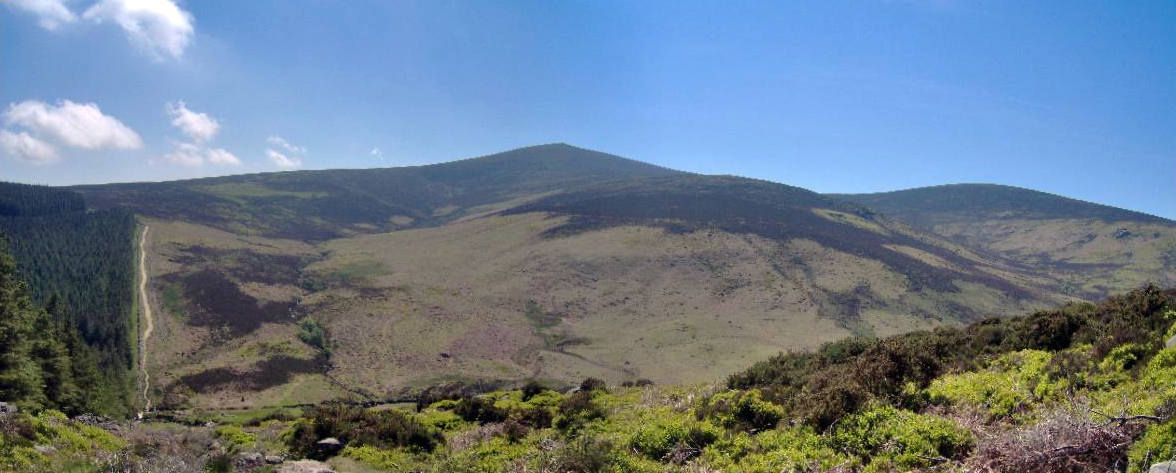
10 - Djouce

This article comprises a sortable table of major mountain peaks of the Wicklow Mountains of Ireland. This article defines a major mountain peak as a summit with a topographic elevation of at least 300 m (980 ft). Topographic elevation is defined as the vertical distance above the reference geoid, a precise mathematical model of the Earth's sea level as an equipotential gravitational surface.

Rank	Mountain peak	Elevation
1	Lugnaquilla	925 m (3,035 ft)
2	Mullaghcleevaun	849 m (2,785 ft)
3	Tonelagee	817 m (2,680 ft)
4	Cloghernagh	800 m (2,600 ft)
5	Corrigasleggaun	794 m (2,605 ft)
6	Slievemaan	759 m (2,490 ft)
7	Camenabologue	758 m (2,487 ft)
8	Kippure	757 m (2,484 ft)
9	Conavalla	734 m (2,408 ft)
10	Djouce	725 m (2,379 ft)
11	Seefingan	724 m (2,375 ft)
12	Duff Hill	720 m (2,360 ft)
13	Gravale	718 m (2,356 ft)
14	Barnacullian	714 m (2,343 ft)
15	Moanbane	703 m (2,306 ft)
16	Table Mountain	701 m (2,300 ft)
17	Camaderry	698 m (2,290 ft)
18	Silsean	698 m (2,290 ft)
19	Benleagh	689 m (2,260 ft)
20	War Hill	686 m (2,251 ft)
21	Carrigvore	682 m (2,238 ft)
22	Mullacor	657 m (2,156 ft)
23	Keadeen	653 m (2,142 ft)
24	Ballineddan	652 m (2,139 ft)
25	Logduff	652 m (2,139 ft)
26	Croaghanmoira	650 m (2,130 ft)
27	Seahan	648 m (2,126 ft)
28	Tonduff	642 m (2,106 ft)
29	Scarr	641 m (2,103 ft)
30	Lobawn	636 m (2,087 ft)
31	White Hill	630 m (2,070 ft)
32	Seefin	621 m (2,037 ft)
33	Croghan Mountain	606 m (1,988 ft)
34	Luggala	595 m (1,952 ft)
35	Glendoo	582 m (1,909 ft)
36	Maulin	570 m (1,870 ft)
37	Slieve Maan	560 m (1,840 ft)
38	Brockagh	557 m (1,827 ft)
39	Prince William's Seat	555 m (1,821 ft)
40	Sugarloaf	552 m (1,811 ft)
41	Church Mountain	543 m (1,781 ft)
42	Ballycurragh Hill	536 m (1,759 ft)
43	Two Rock	536 m (1,759 ft)
44	Ballinacor	531 m (1,742 ft)
45	Cullentragh	510 m (1,670 ft)
46	Carrickashane	508 m (1,667 ft)
47	Great Sugar Loaf	501 m (1,644 ft)
48	Kirikee	474 m (1,555 ft)
49	Tibradden Mountain	467 m (1,532 ft)
50	Ballinafunshoge	460 m (1,510 ft)
51	Three Rock	450 m (1,480 ft)
52	Ballygobban Hill	447 m (1,467 ft)
53	Coolafunshoge	431 m (1,414 ft)
54	Aghowle Upper	420 m (1,380 ft)
55	Kilmashogue	403 m (1,322 ft)
56	Cushbawn	400 m (1,300 ft)
57	Coolgarrow	398 m (1,306 ft)
58	Garryhoe	397 m (1,302 ft)
58	Muskeagh Hill	397 m (1,302 ft)
59	Slieveboy	391 m (1,283 ft)
60	Montpelier Hill	383 m (1,257 ft)
61	Carrick Mountain	381 m (1,250 ft)
62	Cupidstown Hill	379 m (1,243 ft)
63	Cronelea	357 m (1,171 ft)
64	Little Sugar Loaf	342 m (1,122 ft)
65	Slieveroe	328 m (1,076 ft)
