= Lybagh =

Peak in the Wicklow Mountains, Ireland

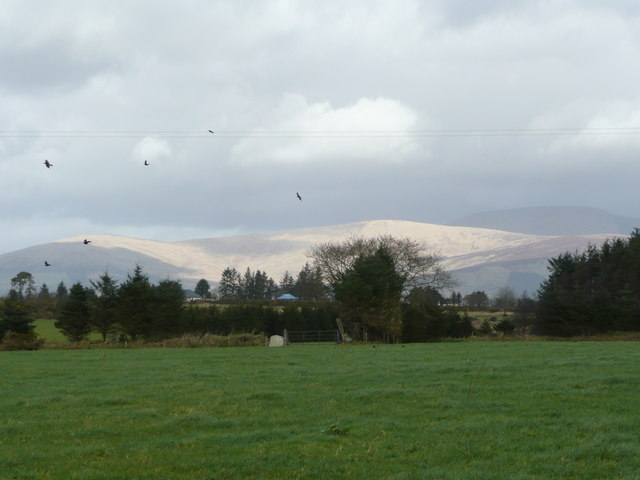
- View of Slievemaan, Lybagh, in the centre, and Lugnaquilla, in the shadow at the right

Highest point
- Elevation: 682.6 m (2,240 ft)
- Listing: Hewitt
- Coordinates: 52°56′46″N 6°28′42″W

Naming
- Native name: Leadhbach (Irish)

Geography
- Location within island of Ireland
- Parent range: Wicklow Mountains
- Topo map: OSi Discovery 56

Lybagh (Irish: leadhbach) is a mountain in Ireland, located in County Wicklow, in the province of Leinster. It is in the eastern part of the country, 50 km south of Dublin. Lybagh, at a height of 683 metres (2,241 ft) above sea level, is categorised as a Hewitt. It is in the Wicklow Mountains and is the high point of the townland of Lybagh in the electoral division of Ballinguile, within the civil parish of Kiltegan, in the Barony of Ballinacor South, County Wicklow.

Lybagh is 2.9 km south of Lugnaquillia Mountain, the highest mountain on the Irish east coast, at 925 metres (3,035 ft) above sea level. The surrounding land is mostly hilly, but is flat in the southwest and the area around Lybagh is mostly covered with grassland and is an uninhabited townland. The nearest villages are Rathdangan and Kiltegan with the larger town of Baltinglass 15.3 km to the west of the mountain.

According to the historian Liam Price, the meaning of the Irish name leadhbachis mostly the long strip of poor land that is first mentioned in the 1839 Ordnance Survey.

The River Derreen rises on the southern slopes of Lybagh and Slievemaan and flows southwest until it joins the River Slaney in County Carlow.

The climate is coastal, with an average temperature of 6 °C (43 °F). The hottest month is June, at 14 °C (57 °F), and the coldest is January, at 1 °C (34 °F).
