= Donard =

Village in County Wicklow, Ireland

Donard Dún Ard
- Village
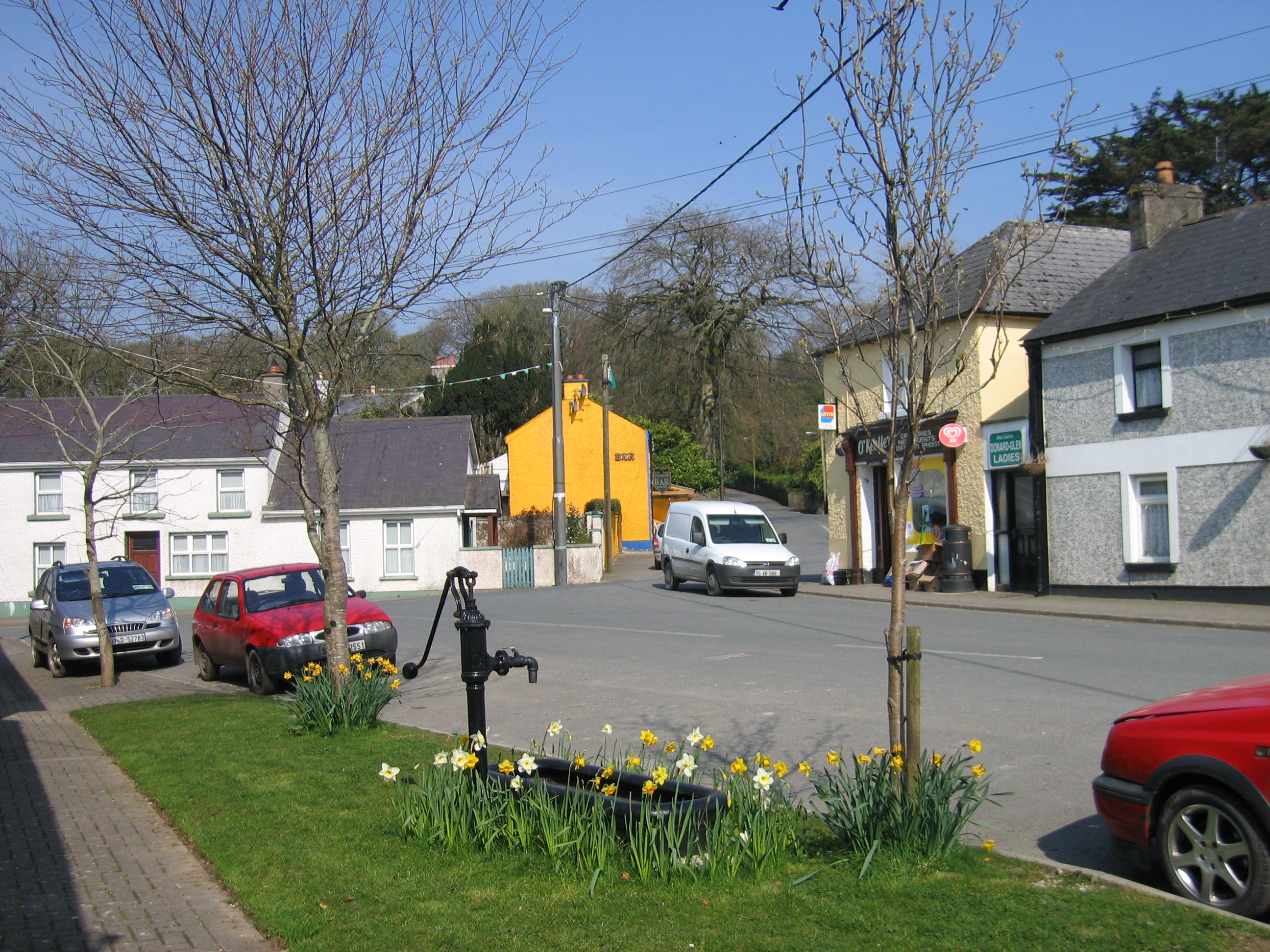
- Donard village

- Location in Ireland
- Coordinates: 53°01′00″N 6°37′00″W
- Country: Ireland
- Province: Leinster
- County: County Wicklow
- Elevation: 180 m (590 ft)

Population (2016)
  - Total: 196
- Time zone: UTC+0 (WET)
  - Summer (DST): UTC-1 (IST (WEST))
- Irish Grid Reference: S929977

Donard (historically Dunard, from Irish: Dún Ard, meaning 'high fort') is a small village in County Wicklow, Ireland, located at the northern end of the Glen of Imaal, in the western part of the Wicklow Mountains. The village is in a civil parish of the same name.

Located near the village of Donard is Lugnaquilla, which is the highest mountain in Wicklow and one of the highest mountains in Ireland. The mountain has a height of 925 metres (3,035 ft). The Wicklow Mountain Rescue team operates in the area.

Donard takes its name from Dún Ard meaning high fort, the ruins of which are still somewhat visible on a rise above the town. The village is surrounded by Table Mountain (702m), Church Mountain (546m), Lugnaquilla (925m) and Keadeen (655m).

== History ==
An ogham stone is located on the village green. It was moved to this site in 1995 having had three previous locations. It is a rectangular block of stone measuring 1.52m x 0.69m x 0.53m.

Donard Motte (also known as the Ball Moat) is a Norman motte-and-bailey structure on the southern side of the village. It was most likely built by Jordan de Marisco between 1169 and 1190.

In the nearby village of Derrynamuck (also known as Dernamuck or Doire na Muc) is a cottage dedicated to the memory of Michael Dwyer, an Irish insurgent active during the 1798 Rebellion. There, an engagement between British forces and a detachment of United Irishmen rebels led by Dwyer, known as the Dwyer-English engagement, occurred on 15 February 1799. During the battle, a fellow insurgent, Sam McAllister, intentionally drew the direction of British fire towards himself in order to allow Dwyer to escape.

During the Rebellion, the village was burnt by the rebels and the inhabitants were forced to flee to Dunlavin.

The Great Famine impacted Donard and the surrounding areas significantly. The population of the parish declined by one third between 1841 and 1851.

Much of the surrounding Glen of Imaal (5,948 acres) has been used as an army artillery range since 1900.

== Amenities ==
A post office was opened in Donard in 1851 and An Post closed it at the end of 2018.

There is a Roman Catholic chapel of ease, Church of the Holy Trinity, in the village as Donard is part of the parish of Dunlavin. It was built in 1926. There is a small First Fruits Church of Ireland church in the village which dates to 1835.

Donard Community Hall sits in the centre of the village, and houses a community coffee shop

Donard/Glen GAA club grounds are on the outskirts of the village.
