= River Derreen =

River in southeastern Ireland, tributary of the Slaney

Coordinates: 52°45′52″N 6°44′11″W

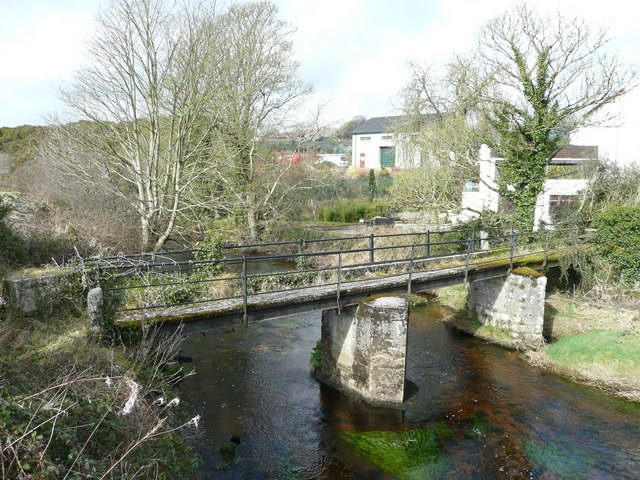
- Footbridge over the Derreen River near Hacketstown
- Etymology: Diminutive of doire, Irish for grove, esp. oak
- Native name: An Daoirín (Irish)

Location
- Country: Ireland
- Cities: Hacketstown, Tullow

Physical characteristics
- Source
  - location: Lugnaquilla, County Wicklow
- Mouth: River Slaney
  - location: Tullow, County Carlow
- Length: 40 km (25 mi)
- Basin size: 201.18 km^{2} (77.68 sq mi)

The River Derreen (Irish: An Daoirín) is a large river in the southeast of Ireland. It rises on the southern slopes of Lybagh and Slievemaan and flows southwest until it joins the River Slaney in County Carlow, south of Tullow, passing close to Hacketstown and Tullow, County Carlow before it joins the Slaney upstream of Aghade bridge. Running through tillage and pastureland in its lower reaches, the Derreen with its sandy, gravelly bottom is a prime salmon spawning tributary of the Slaney. Passing through counties Wicklow and Carlow, it is the first large, major tributary of the River Slaney.

Towns on the Derreen include Hacketstown and Tullow. It is crossed mainly by old humpbacked stone bridges. It is a rural river, flowing through only 2 major towns.

== Wildlife ==
The River Derreen holds occasional salmon in the spring but the upper reaches are better known for trout, averaging 0.5lbs. The best of the fishing is from March to June. It is primarily a Brown Trout fishery. In season, brown trout, salmon, sea trout and occasional pike are fished. There are two angling clubs with fishing rights on the Derreen River and the remainder is in private hands. It also a habitat of the freshwater pearl mussel.

== See also ==
- Rivers of Ireland
