= Rathdangan =

Village in County Wicklow, Ireland

Rathdangan Ráth Daingin
- Village
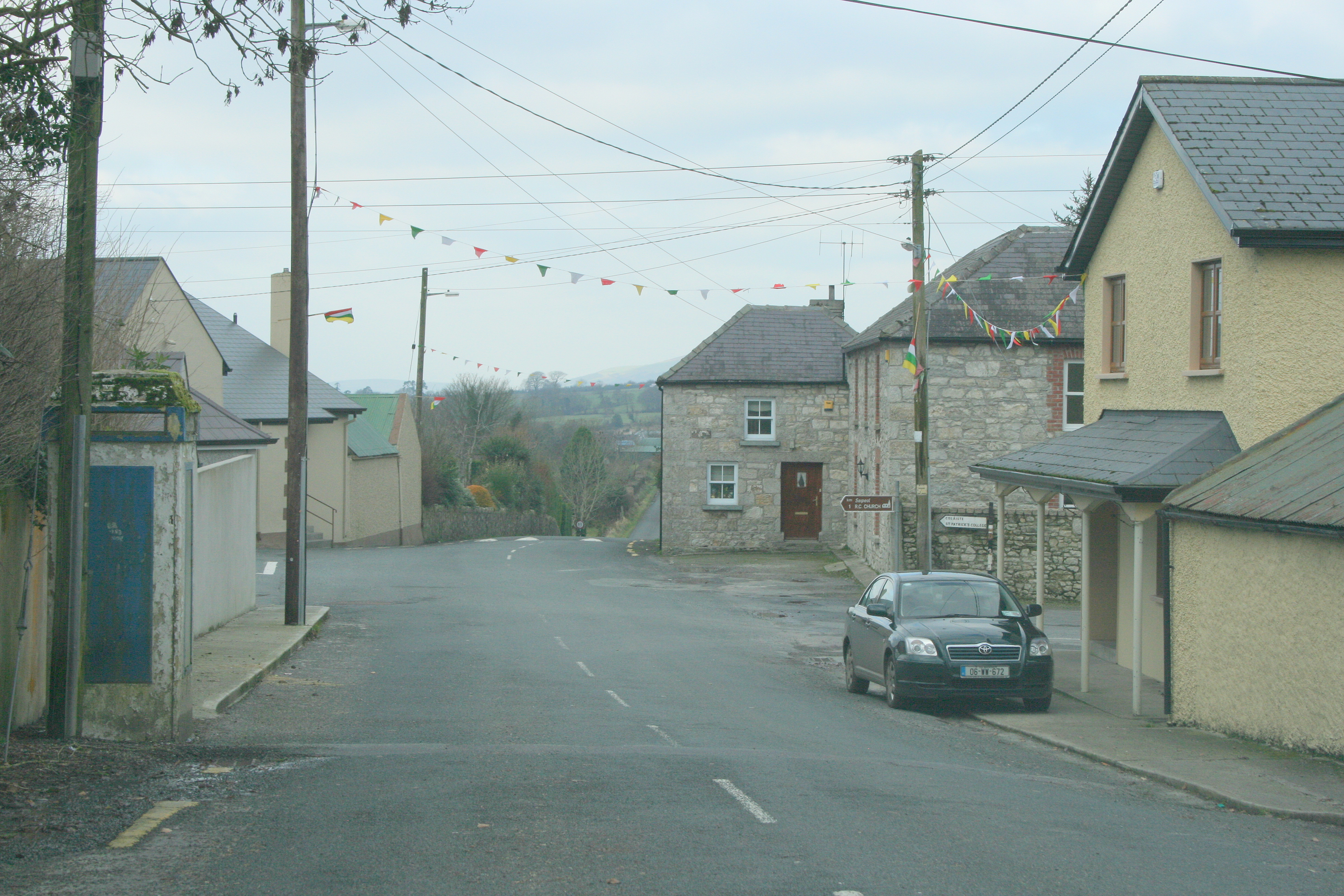
- Rathdangan village

- Location in Ireland
- Coordinates: 52°55′N 6°33′W
- Country: Ireland
- Province: Leinster
- County: County Wicklow

Area
  - Total: 52 km^{2} (20 sq mi)

Population (2006)
  - Total: 543
  - Density: 10/km^{2} (27/sq mi)
- Time zone: UTC+0 (WET)
  - Summer (DST): UTC-1 (IST (WEST))

Rathdangan (Irish: Ráth an Daingin, meaning 'Ringfort of the Stronghold') is a village in County Wicklow, Ireland. It is in the Electoral Division of Rathdangan, in Civil Parish of Kiltegan, in the Barony of Upper Talbotstown.

== History ==
Evidence of habitation is shown by a Bronze Age burial cist, a fort dating from at least the eight-century and a Norman moat at Killamoat. A 1668 survey records 18 houses in the village. Due to its mountainous elevation, in the severe winters of 1947, 1963 and 1982, Rathdangan was isolated for weeks. In 1985 the town was caught up in the moving statues phenomena gripping Ireland when people claimed to see the Rathdangan Marian Year Virgin Mary statue move.

== Toponymy ==
In Liam Price's extensive survey of place names of County Wicklow he recorded that in the Down Survey, dated 1655-9, the name is first noted as Radangin, but the 1660 the Books of Survey and Distribution now uses the spelling Radanginge. A few years later, in 1668, Rathdangin is stated in the Hearth Money Roll of County Wicklow, followed by Radangin in the 1685 Hiberniæ Delineatio. Finally the current village name is shown in A.R. Neville's Map of County Wicklow from circa 1810.

== Geography ==
Rathdangan is at an elevation of 207m. and is located on the road from Aughrim to Baltinglass joining the east and west of County Wicklow. To the north-east the terrain rises up to the summit of Lugnaquilla, the highest mountain in Leinster while Keadeen Mountain at 653 metres (2,142 ft) lies to the north. The village has experienced severe weather with heavy snowfall, cutting off the village for days, during the winters of 1947, 1963 and 1982.

== Places of interest ==
Rathdangan once had two pubs, two shops and a post office. One pub remained known by locals as Junior's but closed during Covid-19 and was put up for sale in July 2022; the name over the door is Byrne's, per the family name. This pub, built in the early 1800s, was the first building in Rathdangan and one of three pubs in the village. A community shop operates most mornings, in the parish hall "The Village Pantry". An amenity park and playground was opened in July 2018.

=== Tober Owen Well ===
A holy well, Tober Owen, or St. John's Well, is a short distance from the village on the left side of the road leading to the Glen of Imaal. A festival used to take place on the saint's day, June 24. An ancient tree used to grow over the well and a man called Moore was eventually hanged on the tree, having been on the run for quite some time, for murdering Hume of Humewood who hunted rebels of the 1798 rebellion. The tale goes that nothing grew upon the limb on which Moore was hanged and when the tree was blown down in a storm, it was used as firewood by some locals but those pieces of the branch used to hang Moore exploded and scattered all around the place. A memorial to Moore was erected beside the well.

=== Saint Mary's Catholic Church ===
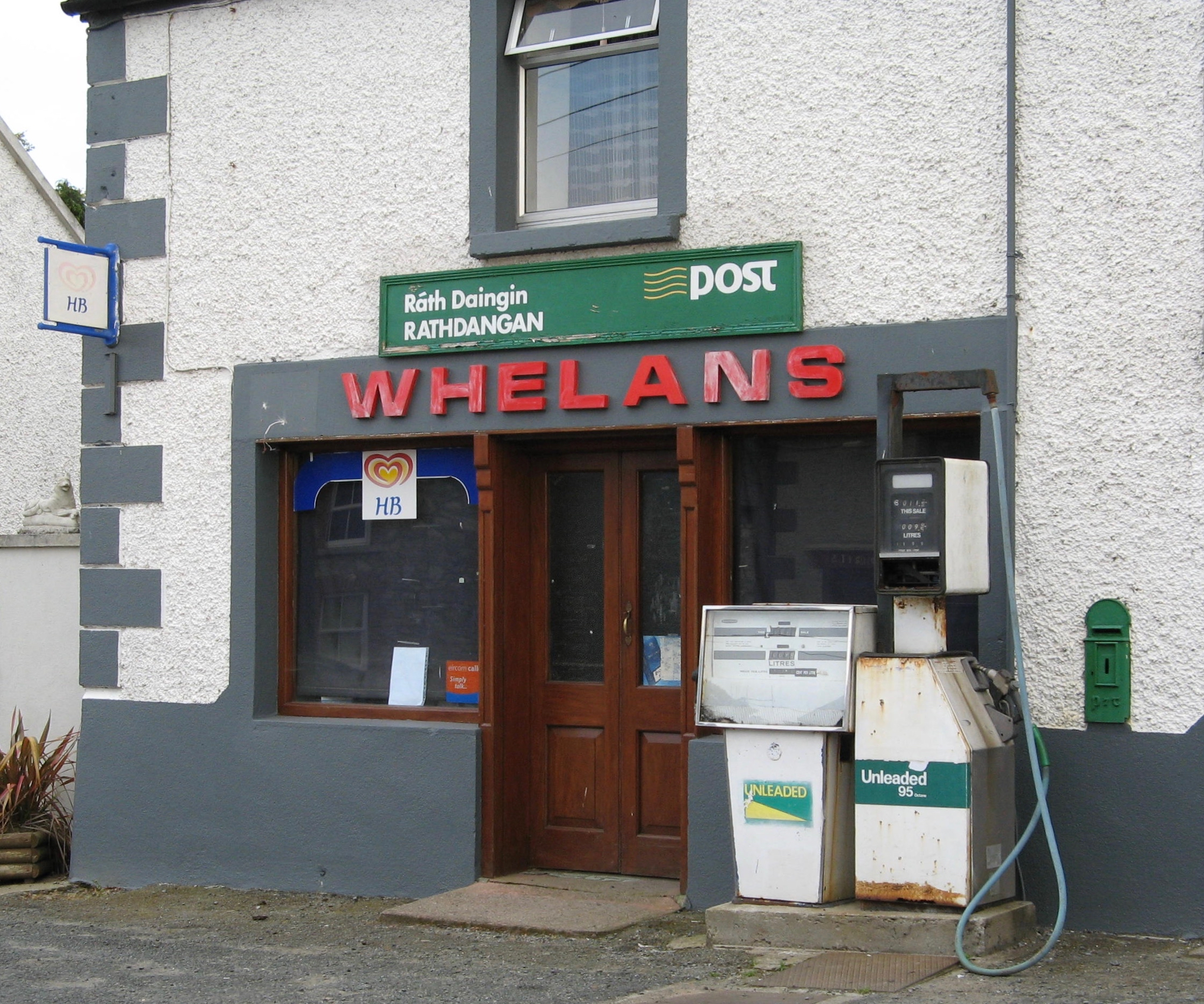
Rathdangan post office soon after its closure in 2007

The local church at Killamote, about 1 km the village, is Saint Mary's Catholic Church, built in a classical style in 1847 and renovated in 1968. The tall windows, mainly of stained glass have semi-circular heads and two of them are by the stained-glass artist Harry Clarke. They depict the Crucifixion (1920), and the Nativity (1925).

=== Post office ===
In 1889 a question were asked in the House of Commons on the possibility of opening a post office but, while it had been considered, it was refused by the Postmaster General on the grounds there was insufficient mail to warrant the cost. Six years later, in 1895, the post office had been opened and closed in mid-2007.

=== Shoeing stone ===
Until the 1950s, the large flat circular stone, inside the bridge wall, was used to install iron bands on wooden cart wheels.
