= Glendoo =

Glendoo may refer to:

- Glendoo Mountain, in the Dublin Mountains, Ireland; see List of mountain peaks of the Wicklow Mountains
- A townland in County Dublin, containing the mountain; see Cruagh
