= Barnacullian =

Mountain in Ireland

Coordinates: 53°05′N 6°24′W

Highest point
- Elevation: 703 m (2,306 ft)

Geography
- Location: County Wicklow, Ireland
- Parent range: Wicklow Mountains
- Topo map: OSi Discovery 56

Barnacullian is a mountain in County Wicklow, Ireland, located just north of Wicklow Mountains National Park. At 703 metres (2,306 ft) it is the 14th highest mountain in the Wicklow Mountains.

An eroding peat bog on the mountain is the focus of a pilot conservation effort.

== See also ==
- Barnacullia quarries
- List of mountains in Ireland
