= Cloghernagh =

Mountain in County Wicklow, Ireland

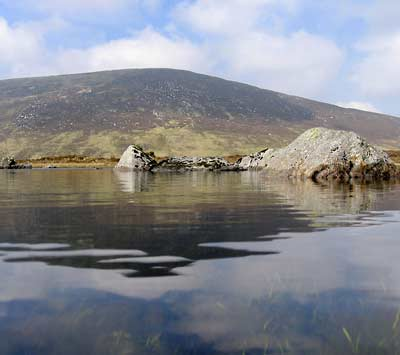
- Cloghernagh Mountain from Arts Lough

Highest point
- Elevation: 800 m (2,600 ft)
- Prominence: 15 m (49 ft)
- Listing: Vandeleur-Lynam
- Coordinates: 52°58′N 6°26′W

Naming
- Native name: Clocharnach
- English translation: stoney place

Geography
- Location within island of Ireland
- Location: County Wicklow, Ireland
- Parent range: Wicklow Mountains
- OSI/OSNI grid: T058918
- Topo map: OSi Discovery 56

Geology
- Mountain type(s): Fine-grained, muscovite-rich aplogranite bedrock

Cloghernagh (Irish: Clocharnach, meaning 'Stoney place') at 800 metres (2,600 ft), does not have the prominence to qualify as an Arderin, but does have the prominence to be the 40th–highest peak on the Vandeleur-Lynam scale. Cloghernagh is situated in the southern sector of the Wicklow Mountains range, and is part of the large massif of Lugnaquilla 925 metres (3,035 ft), Wicklow's highest mountain.

Cloghernagh's northern side forms the steep southern walls and cliffs of the scenic U-shaped hanging valley of Fraughan Rock Glen, which then falls into the Glenmalure valley below; the scenic high corrie lake of Arts Lough 511 metres (1,677 ft), lies high on its north eastern flank. Cloghernagh forms a "horseshoe" around the Fraughan Rock Glen with Lugnaquillia and Benleagh 689 metres (2,260 ft), and another "horseshoe shape" around the glen of the Carrawaystick River with Corrigasleggaun 794 metres (2,605 ft), and the corrie lake of Kelly's Lough.

== Bibliography ==
- Fairbairn, Helen (2014). Ireland's Best Walks: A Walking Guide. Collins Press. ISBN 978-1848892118.
- Fairbairn, Helen (2014). Dublin & Wicklow: A Walking Guide. Collins Press. ISBN 978-1848892019.
- MountainViews Online Database (Simon Stewart) (2013). A Guide to Ireland's Mountain Summits: The Vandeleur-Lynams & the Arderins. Collins Books. ISBN 978-1-84889-164-7.
- Dillion, Paddy (1993). The Mountains of Ireland: A Guide to Walking the Summits. Cicerone. ISBN 978-1852841102.

== Gallery ==
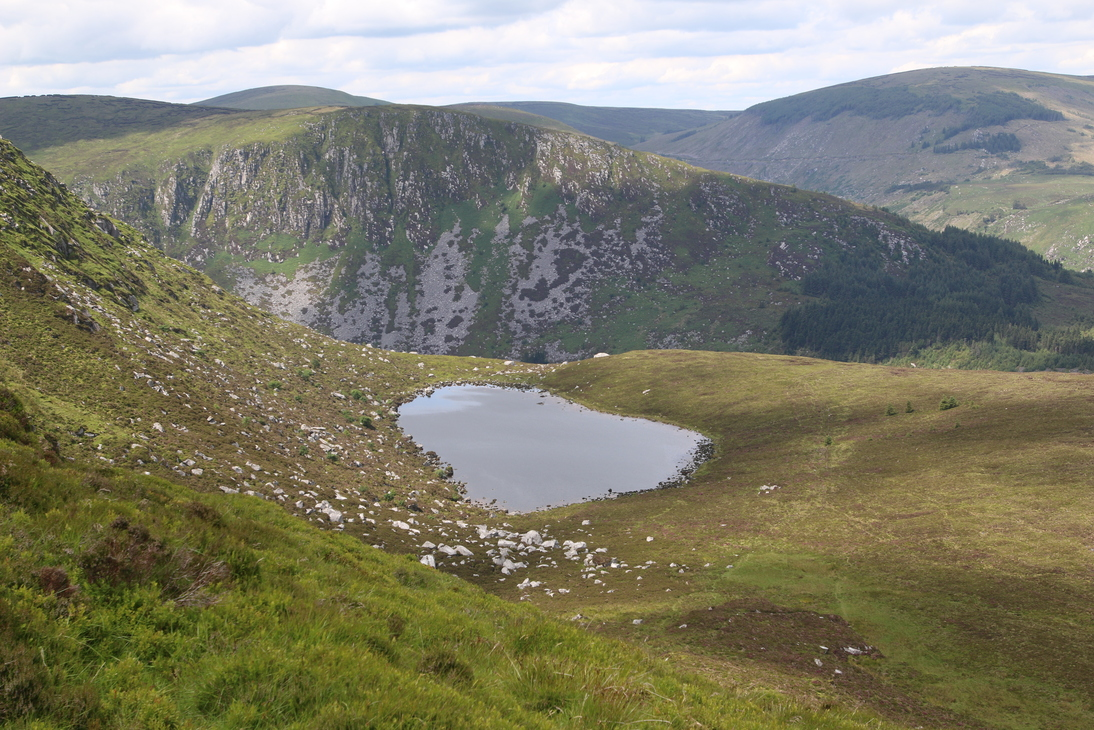
View north to Benleagh

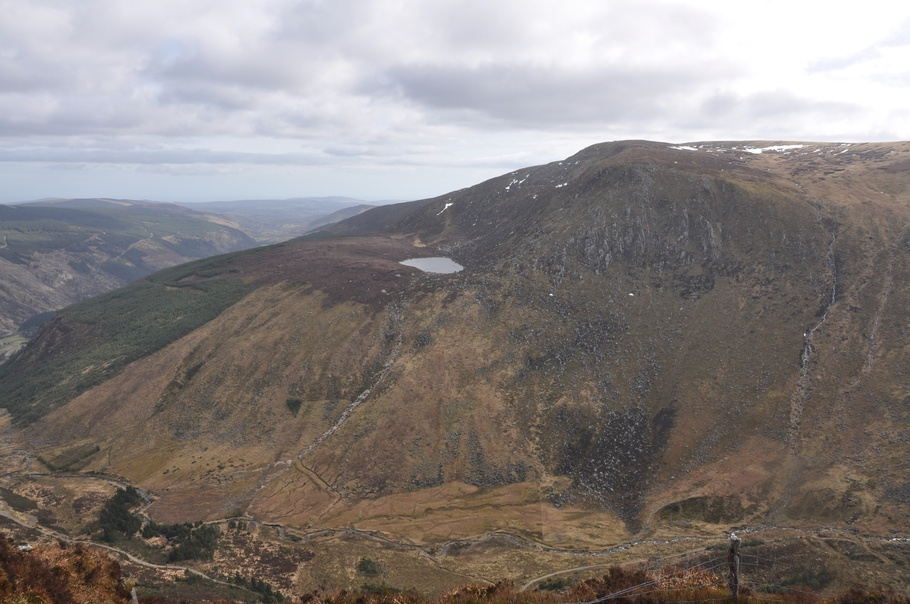
Cloghernagh and Arts Lough from Benleagh

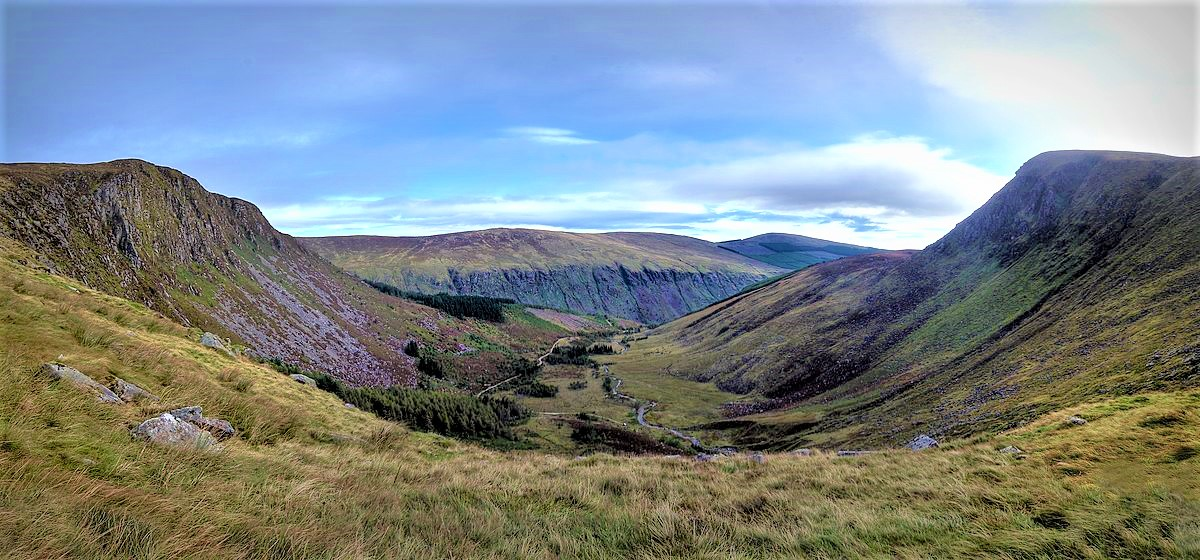
View east down the Fraughan Rock Glen with Cloghernagh (right)

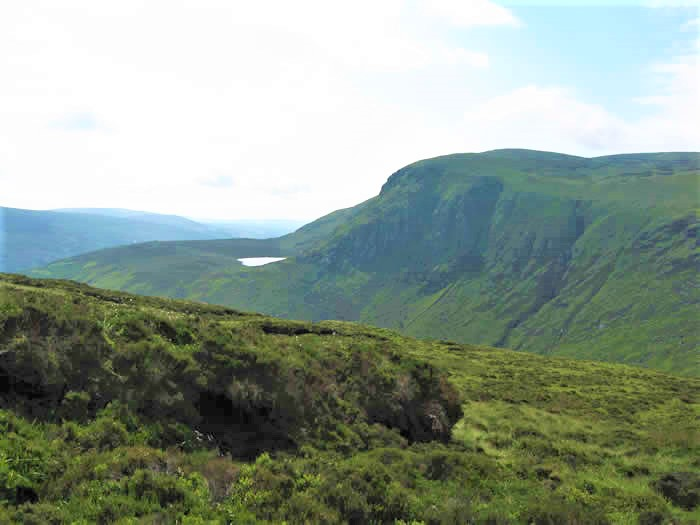
Cloghernagh and Arts Lough from Benleagh

== See also ==
- Wicklow Way
- Wicklow Round
- Wicklow Mountains
- Lists of mountains in Ireland
- List of mountains of the British Isles by height
