= Lobawn =

Mountain in County Wicklow, Ireland

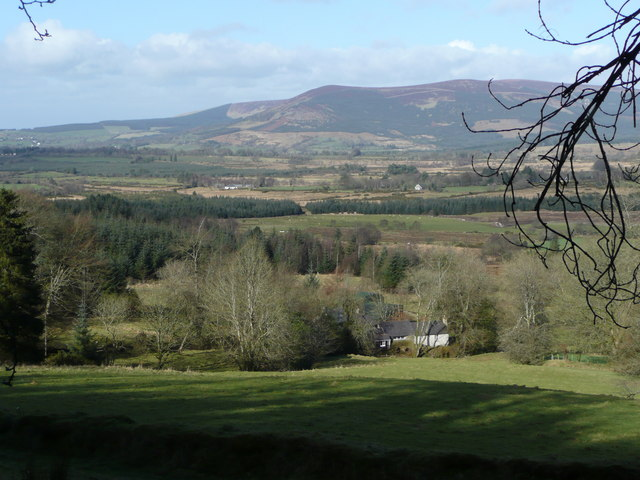
- Sugarloaf (l) and Lobawn (r) from the Glen of Imaal in the south

Highest point
- Elevation: 636 m (2,087 ft)
- Prominence: 111
- Listing: Hewitt, Arderin, Simm, Vandeleur-Lynam
- Coordinates: 53.022198°N 6.543872°W.

Naming
- Native name: Lúbán
- English translation: "Little Bend"

Geography
- Location within island of Ireland
- Location: County Wicklow, Ireland
- Parent range: Wicklow Mountains
- OSI/OSNI grid: S977978
- Topo map: OSi Discovery 56

Geology
- Mountain type(s): Dark slate-schist, quartzite & coticule

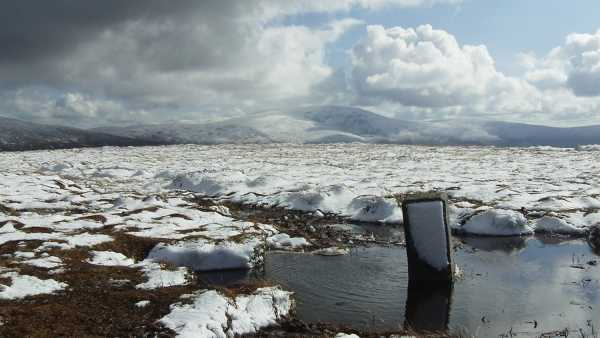
Lobawn's boggy summit plateau and "War Department No. 13" summit marker

Lobawn (Irish: Lúbán, meaning 'little bend') at 636 metres (2,087 ft), is the 182nd–highest peak in Ireland on the Arderin scale, and the 219th–highest peak on the Vandeleur-Lynam scale. Lobawn has a flat boggy summit plateau with a "war department" concrete post to mark the top. Lobawn lies in the west section of the Wicklow Mountains, in County Wicklow, Ireland, and has a subsidiary summit called Sugarloaf (West Wicklow) 552 metres (1,811 ft). Both Lobawn and the Sugarloaf border the Glen of Imaal, and their summits lie close to the actual boundaries of the Glen of Imaal Military Artillery Firing Range.

== Bibliography ==
- Fairbairn, Helen (2014). Dublin & Wicklow: A Walking Guide. Collins Press. ISBN 978-1848892019.
- MountainViews Online Database (Simon Stewart) (2013). A Guide to Ireland's Mountain Summits: The Vandeleur-Lynams & the Arderins. Collins Books. ISBN 978-1-84889-164-7.
- Dillion, Paddy (1993). The Mountains of Ireland: A Guide to Walking the Summits. Cicerone. ISBN 978-1852841102.

== See also ==
- Wicklow Way
- Wicklow Mountains
- Lists of mountains in Ireland
- List of mountains of the British Isles by height
- List of Hewitt mountains in England, Wales and Ireland
