= Benleagh =

Mountain in County Wicklow, Ireland

Coordinates: 52°59′19″N 6°27′15″W

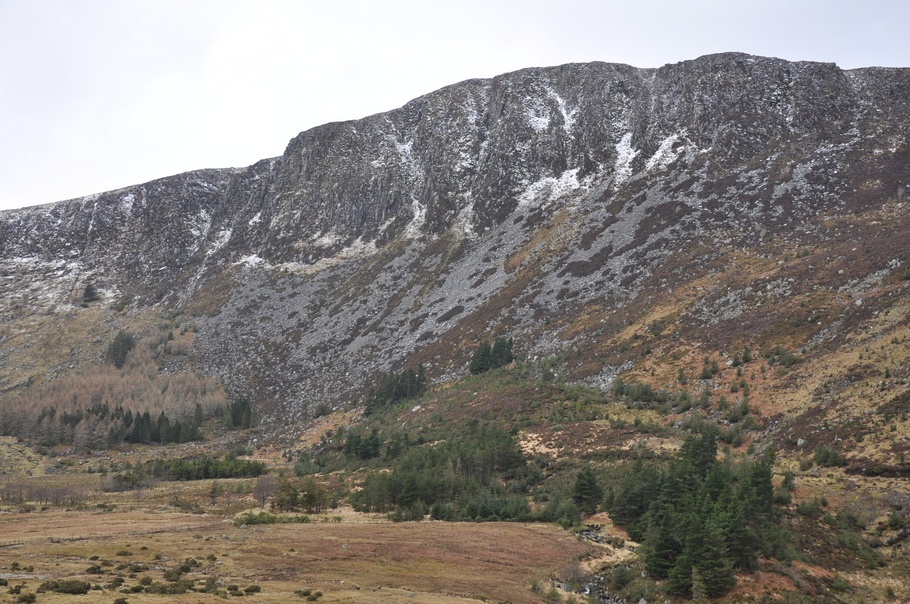
- Southerly cliffs of Benleagh as viewed from the Fraughan Rock Glen

Highest point
- Elevation: 689 m (2,260 ft)
- Prominence: 24 m (79 ft)
- Listing: Vandeleur-Lynam

Naming
- Native name: Binn Liath
- English translation: grey peak

Geography
- Location within island of Ireland
- Location: County Wicklow, Ireland
- Parent range: Wicklow Mountains
- OSI/OSNI grid: T038941
- Topo map: OSi Discovery 56

Geology
- Mountain type: Aphyric granodiorite Bedrock

Benleagh (Irish: Binn Liath, meaning 'Grey Peak') stands at 689 metres (2,260 ft), while it does not have the prominence to qualify as an Arderin, but its prominence does allow it to rank as the 125th–highest peak on the Vandeleur-Lynam scale. Benlagh is situated in the southern sector of the Wicklow Mountains, and is part of the large massif of Lugnaquilla 925 metres (3,035 ft), County Wicklow's highest mountain.

Benleagh's southern flank forms the steep walls and cliffs of the hanging valley of Fraughan Rock Glen, which then falls into the U-shaped valley of Glenmalure below; Benleagh forms a "horseshoe" around the Fraughan Rock Glen with Lugnaquillia at its apex and Cloghernagh 800 metres (2,600 ft), to the south. Benleagh also sits on a broad "spine" that links Lugnaquilla in the south, to Camenabologue and Table Mountain to the north, which circle the Glen of Imaal.

== Bibliography ==
- Fairbairn, Helen (2014). Dublin & Wicklow: A Walking Guide. Collins Press. ISBN 978-1848892019.
- Fairbairn, Helen (2014). Ireland's Best Walks: A Walking Guide. Collins Press. ISBN 978-1848892118.
- MountainViews Online Database (Simon Stewart) (2013). A Guide to Ireland's Mountain Summits: The Vandeleur-Lynams & the Arderins. Collins Books. ISBN 978-1-84889-164-7.
- Dillion, Paddy (1993). The Mountains of Ireland: A Guide to Walking the Summits. Cicerone. ISBN 978-1852841102.

== Gallery ==
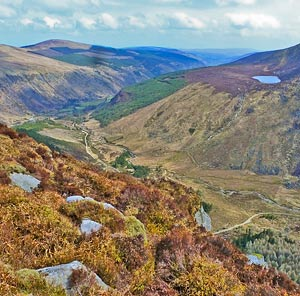
View south-east from summit of Benleagh

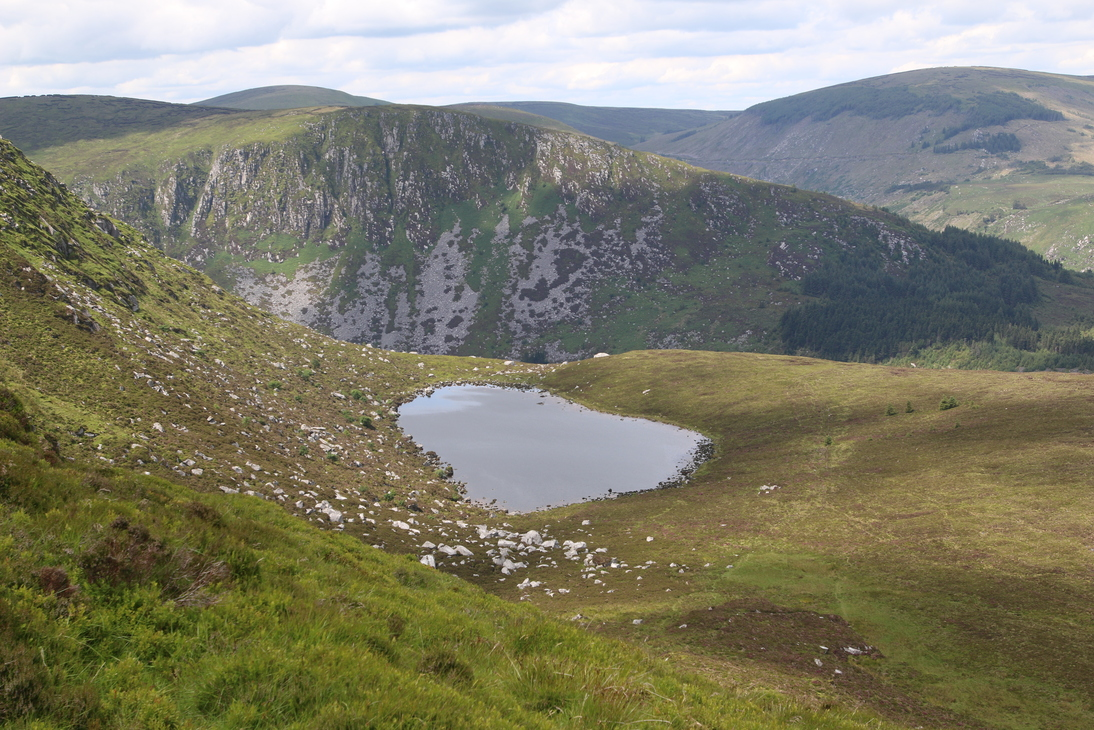
Cliffs of Benleagh from Arts Lough, below summit of Cloghernagh

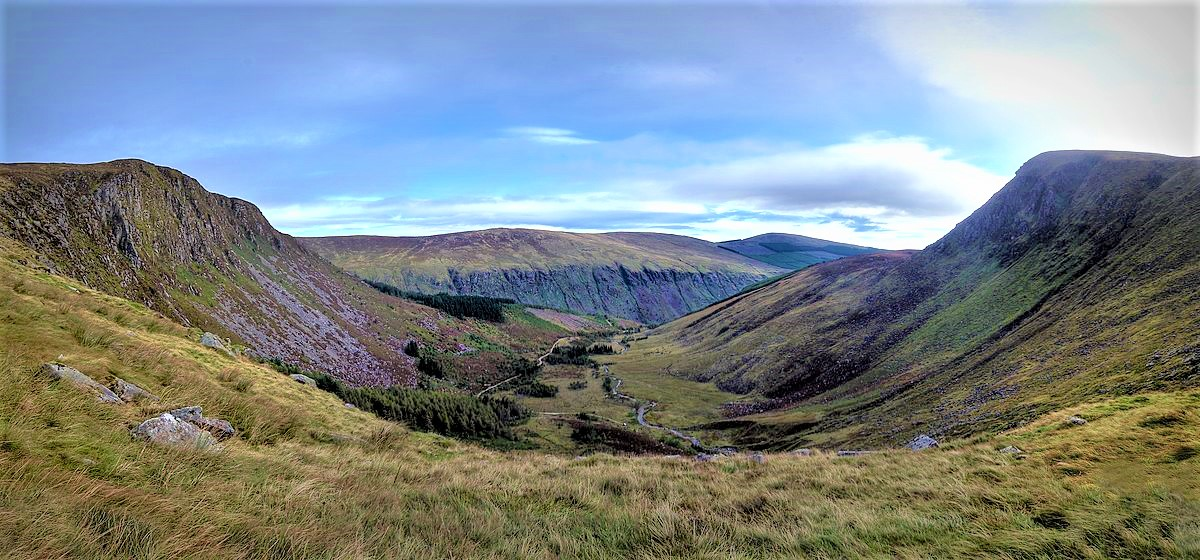
View east across the Fraughan Rock Glen with Benleagh (left) and Cloghernagh (right)

== See also ==
- Wicklow Way
- Wicklow Round
- Wicklow Mountains
- Lists of mountains in Ireland
- List of mountains of the British Isles by height
