= J. P. Dalton =

Irish Gaelic footballer

Personal information
- Born: 1984 (age 41–42) Kiltegan, County Wicklow

Sport
- Sport: Gaelic football
- Position: Left Half Forward
Club
- Years: Club
- ?-present: Kiltegan
Inter-county
- Years: County
- 2005-present: Wicklow
Inter-county titles
- Leinster titles: 0
- All-Irelands: 0
- NFL: 0

J. P. Dalton is a Gaelic footballer from County Wicklow, Ireland. He plays Gaelic football with his local club Kiltegan and has been a member of the Wicklow senior panel since 2005.
