= Church Mountain =

Mountain in County Wicklow, Ireland

Church Mountain / Slieve Gad
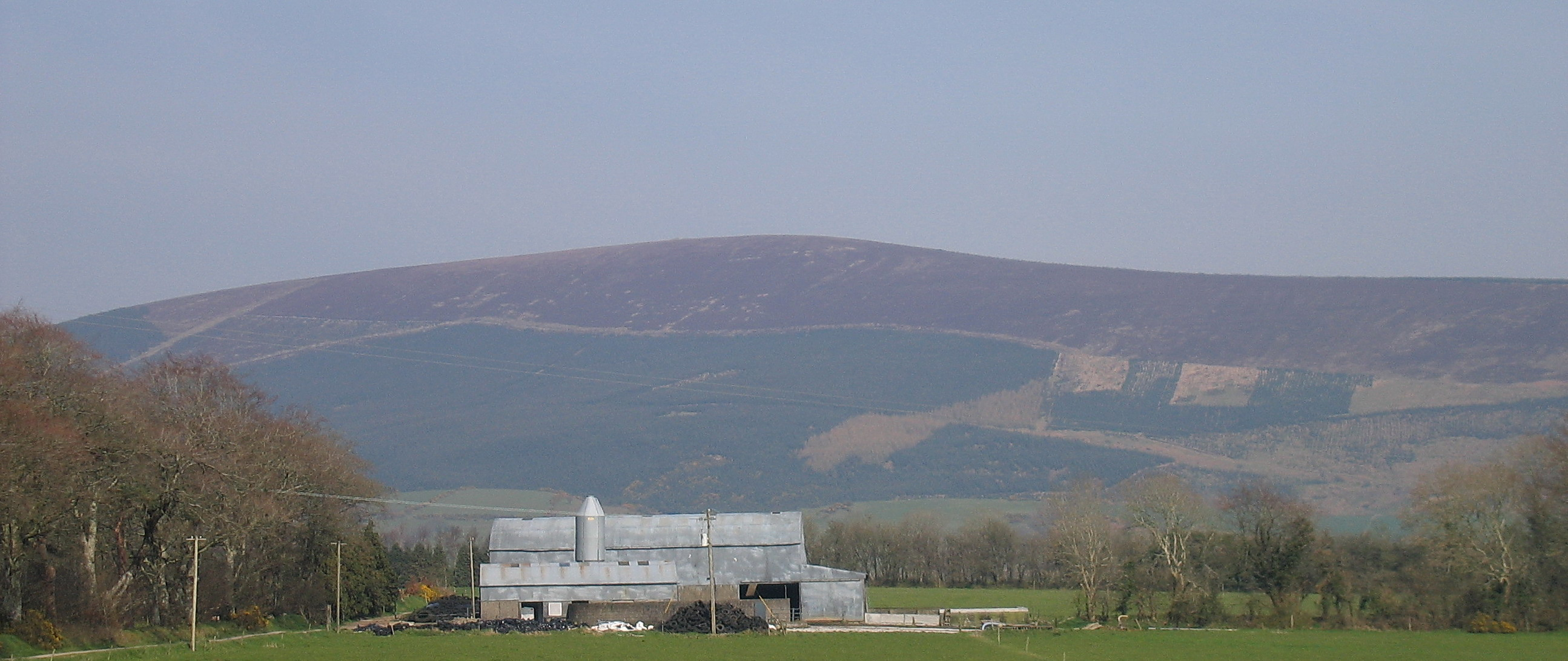
- Church Mountain from the south

Highest point
- Elevation: 544 m (1,785 ft)
- Prominence: 129 m (423 ft)
- Coordinates: 53.05334°N 6.585697°W

Naming
- Native name: Sliabh gCod / Sliabh an Chodaigh

Geography
- Location within island of Ireland
- Location: County Wicklow, Ireland
- Parent range: Wicklow Mountains
- OSI/OSNI grid: N948012
- Topo map: OSi Discovery 56

Church Mountain, also called Slieve Gad (Irish: Sliabh gCod / Sliabh an Chodaigh, meaning 'mountain of the covenant'), is the westernmost of the Wicklow Mountains in Ireland. It is 544 metres (1,785 ft) high. At the summit are the remains of a large ancient cairn of pagan origin. This cairn was partially destroyed and a small building, apparently a church, was built on it in the Middle Ages. Pilgrims formerly climbed the mountain during the festival of Lughnasa to visit a holy well on the summit. The well known Irish antiquarian George Petrie mentioned Church Mountain when he attended a pilgrimage there on Lammas Day in 1808.

The mountain lies roughly halfway between Hollywood to the north and Donard to the south.

== Gallery ==
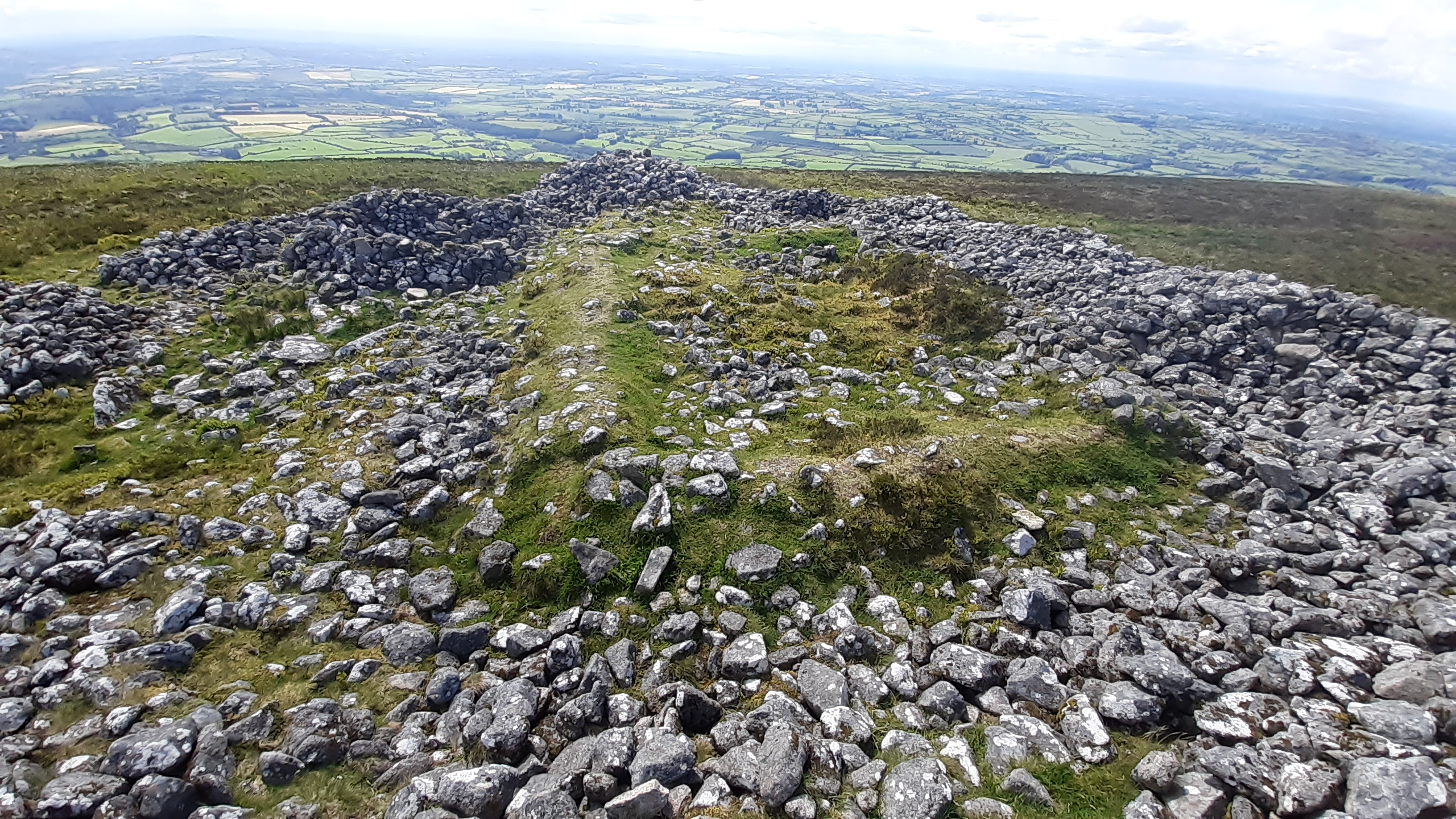
Ruins on the summit of the mountain

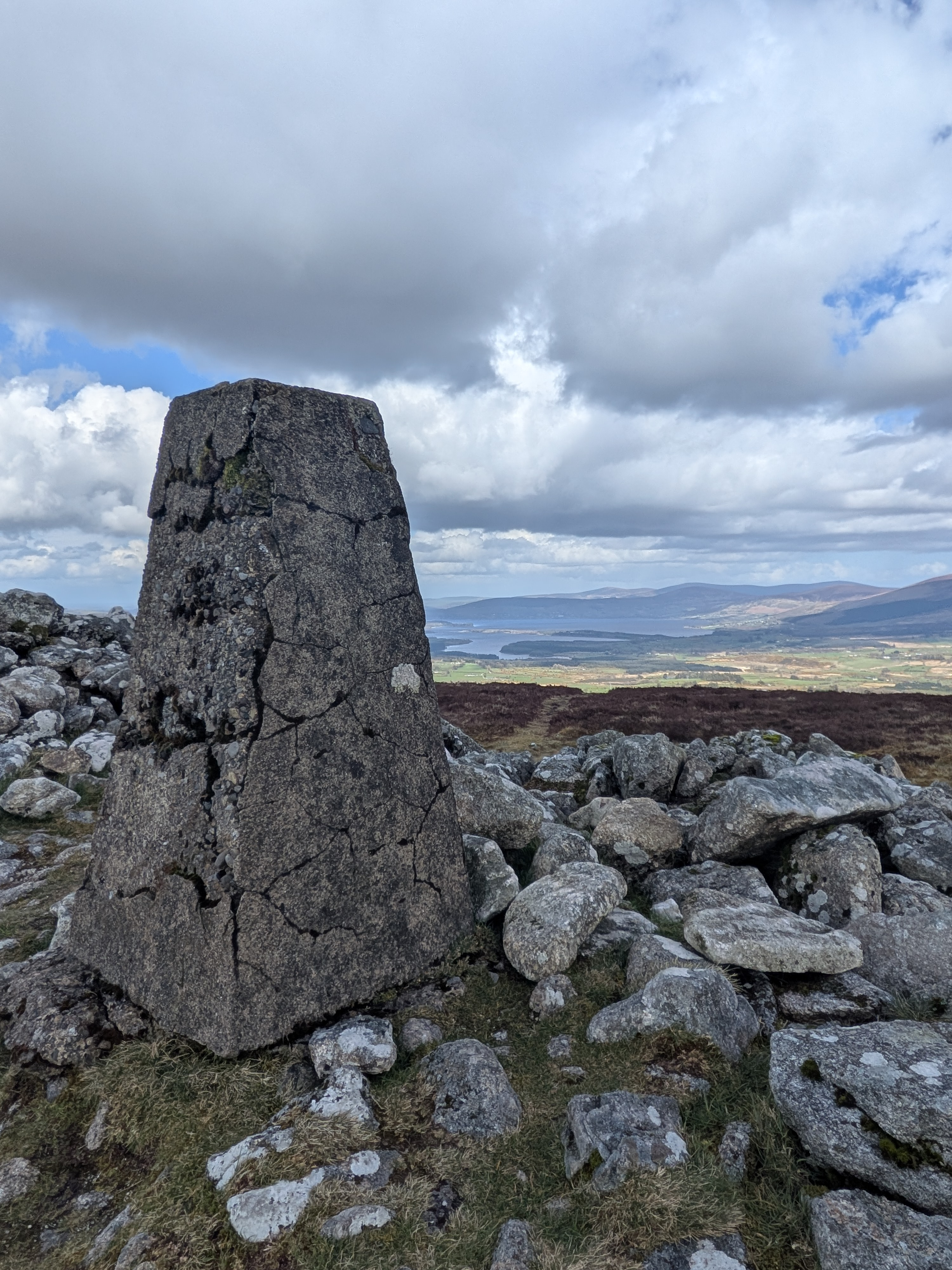
Trip point and view of Blessington Lake from the summit

== See also ==
- List of mountains in Ireland
