= Sugarloaf (West Wicklow) =

Mountain in County Wicklow, Ireland

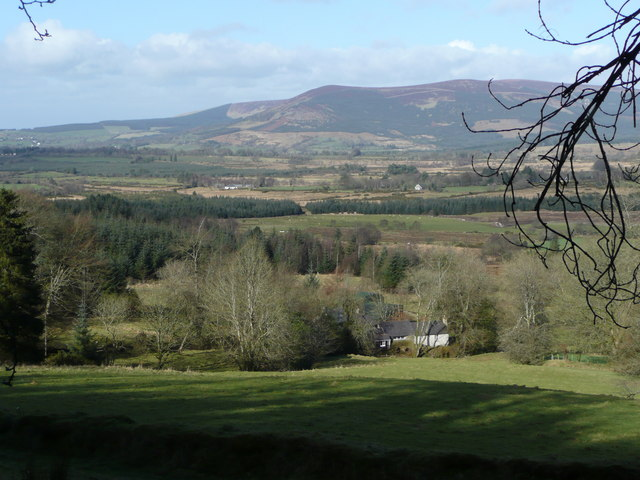
- Sugarloaf (l) and Lobawn (r) from the Glen of Imaal in the south

Highest point
- Elevation: 552 m (1,811 ft)
- Prominence: 14 m (46 ft)
- Listing: none
- Coordinates: 53.011092°N 6.558082°W.

Geography
- Location within Ireland
- Location: County Wicklow, Ireland
- Parent range: Wicklow Mountains
- OSI/OSNI grid: S968965
- Topo map: OSi Discovery 56

Geology
- Mountain type(s): Dark slate-schist, quartzite & coticule

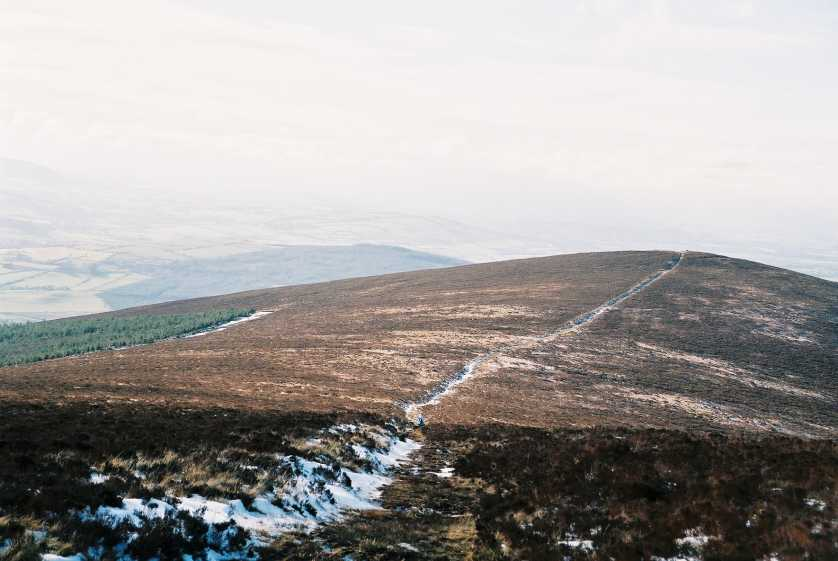
Path from the summit of Lobawn to the summit of the Sugarloaf

Sugarloaf is a 552 metres (1,811 ft) peak in west County Wicklow, Ireland that lies on the northern edge of the Glen of Imaal. With a prominence of only 14 metres (46 ft), it is not listed in any of the recognised categories of mountains in Ireland, and is a subsidiary summit of Lobawn 636 metres (2,087 ft), to the north.

Sugarloaf should not be confused with the better known Great Sugar Loaf 501 metres (1,644 ft), and the Little Sugar Loaf 342 metres (1,122 ft) in the northeastern section of the Wicklow Mountains.

== Bibliography ==
- Fairbairn, Helen (2014). Dublin & Wicklow: A Walking Guide. Collins Press. ISBN 978-1848892019.
- MountainViews Online Database (Simon Stewart) (2013). A Guide to Ireland's Mountain Summits: The Vandeleur-Lynams & the Arderins. Collins Books. ISBN 978-1-84889-164-7.

== See also ==
- Wicklow Way
- Wicklow Mountains
- Lists of mountains in Ireland
- List of mountains of the British Isles by height
- List of Hewitt mountains in England, Wales and Ireland
