= Kiltegan =

Village in County Wicklow, Ireland

Kiltegan Cill Téagáin
- Village
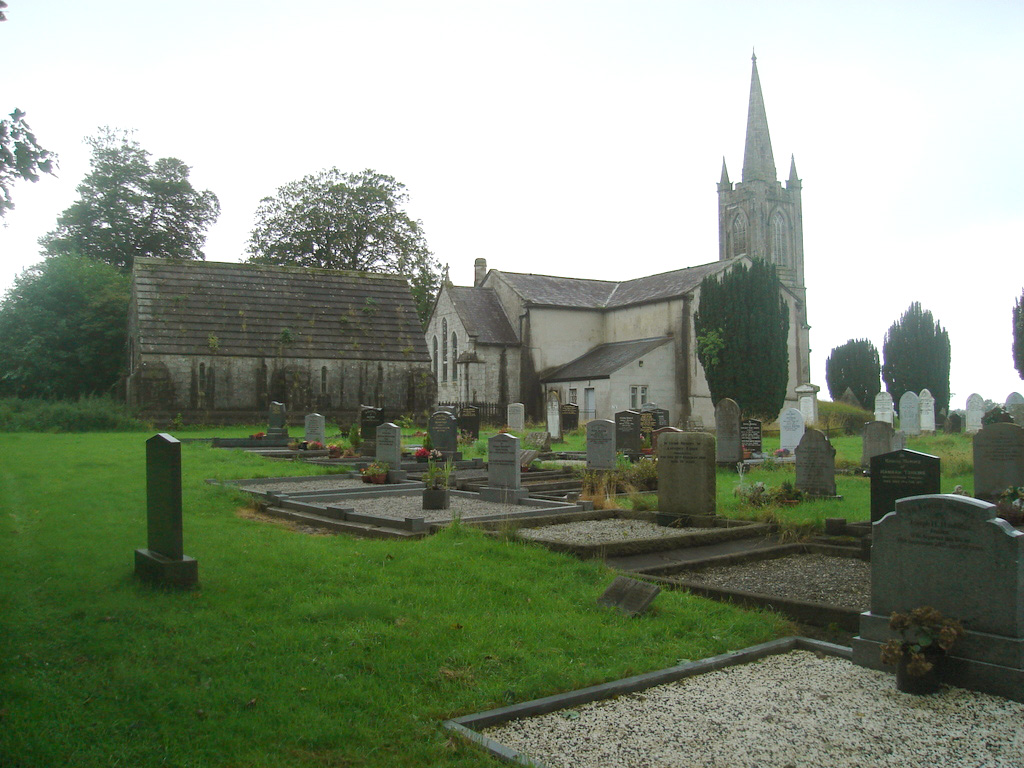
- Kiltegan Church of Ireland and Hume family mausoleum

- Location in Ireland
- Coordinates: 52°54′15″N 6°36′24″W
- Country: Ireland
- Province: Leinster
- County: County Wicklow
- Elevation: 148 m (486 ft)
- Time zone: UTC+0 (WET)
  - Summer (DST): UTC-1 (IST (WEST))
- Irish Grid Reference: S935848

Kiltegan (Irish: Cill Téagáin, meaning 'church of Tegan') is a village in west County Wicklow, Ireland, on the R747 regional road close to the border with County Carlow. The village is in a townland and civil parish of the same name. The civil parish extends into County Carlow.

According to tradition, the village takes its Irish name, Cill Téagáin (meaning 'church of Tegan'), from a 5th century saint who was reputedly a disciple of Saint Patrick.

The 19th century mansion Humewood House lies just outside the village. It was built in 1870 for William Hume-Dick, father-in-law of Richard Penruddocke Long, by William White. It remained in the Hume family until the death of Mimi Weygand (née Hume), in 1992. The house has been used as a location for films such as The Actors (2003) starring Michael Caine, Ella Enchanted (2004) with Anne Hathaway, Laws of Attraction (2004) starring Pierce Brosnan and Julianne Moore, and for ABC's television movie, "Prince William" (2002).

The Roman Catholic St Patrick's Missionary Society, known as the Kiltegan Fathers, has its mother house at High Park 2 km from the village.

Kiltegan won the Irish Tidy Towns Competition in 1973.

The village is also home to Kiltegan GAA club, which also includes players from the nearby sister village of Rathdangan. Kiltegan GAA club fields hurling, football and camogie teams.

== Notable people ==
- J. P. Dalton (born 1984), Gaelic footballer

== See also ==
- List of towns and villages in Ireland
