= Keadeen Mountain =

Mountain in County Wicklow, Ireland

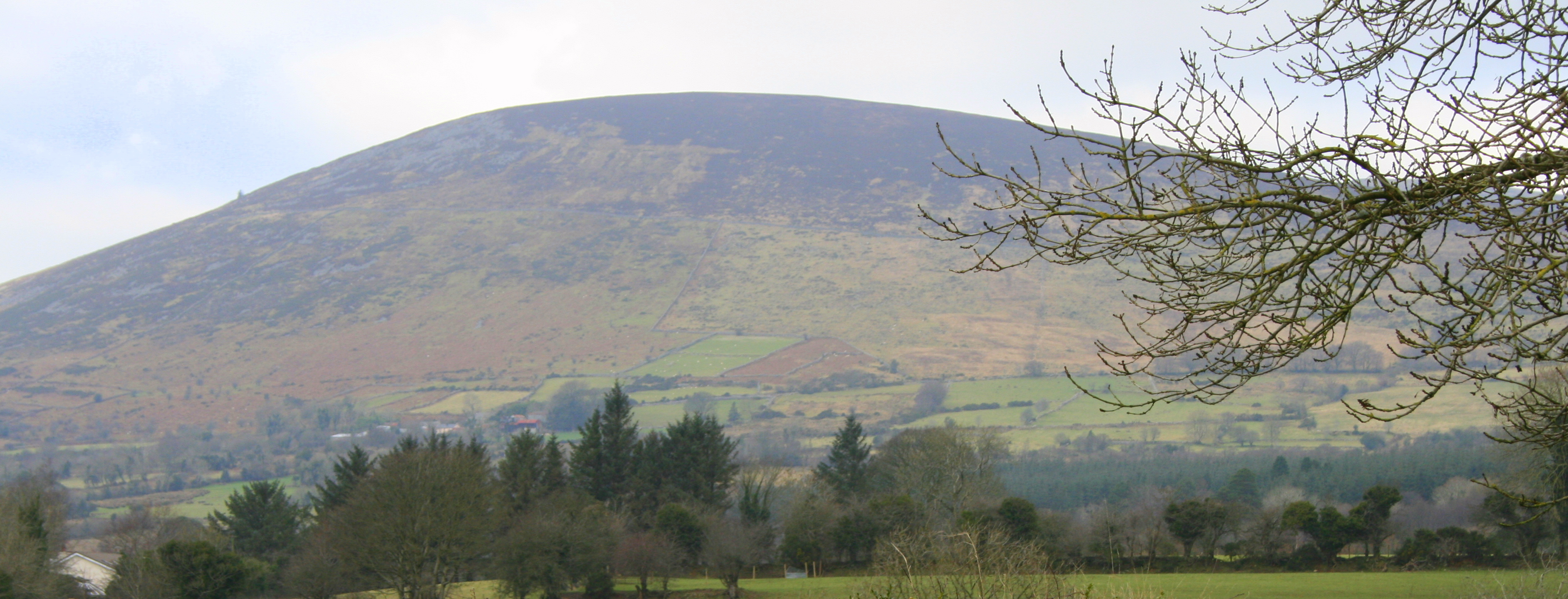
- View from Rathdangan in south

Highest point
- Elevation: 653 m (2,142 ft)
- Prominence: 334 m (1,096 ft)
- Listing: 100 Highest Irish Mountains, Marilyn, Hewitt, Arderin, Simm, Vandeleur-Lynam
- Coordinates: 52°57′02″N 6°34′53″W

Naming
- Native name: Céidín
- English translation: flat-topped hill

Geography
- Location within island of Ireland
- Location: County Wicklow, Ireland
- Parent range: Wicklow Mountains
- OSI/OSNI grid: S9539489764
- Topo map: OSi Discovery 62

Geology
- Mountain type(s): Dark slate-schist, quartzite & coticule

Keadeen Mountain (Irish: Céidín, meaning 'flat-topped hill') at 653 metres (2,142 ft), is the 152nd–highest peak in Ireland on the Arderin scale, and the 184th–highest peak on the Vandeleur-Lynam scale. Keadeen is situated at the far southwestern end of the Wicklow Mountains range, separated from the large massif of Lugnaquilla on its own small isolated massif with Carrig Mountain 571 metres (1,873 ft); it overlooks the Glen of Imaal from the south.

== Naming ==
According to Irish academic Paul Tempan, "Keadeen" is also the name of a townland in the nearby parish of Kilranelagh. In Irish the peak was sometimes called Céidín Uí Mháil in full, which was a name derived from the native group who gave their name to the nearby Glen of Imaal.

== Prehistory ==
The hilltop is crowned by a robbed-out cairn of unknown date. Just below the cairn a cursus monument of about 300 m length and 40 m width stretches down the western slope of the mountain. Its limiting banks and ditches are still visible in the landscape as roughly parallel 0.4 m high ridges and 0.3 m deep furrows respectively. According to its investigators the cursus is oriented towards the sun rise on summer solstice: standing at the centre of the cursus the sun rises behind the summit of Keadeen mountain. The cursus is tentatively dated to the Middle Neolithic (ca. 3500 to 3000 BC).

These monuments are embedded in a landscape with prehistoric hillforts and dozens of cairns on top of Cloghnagaune, Spinans Hill and Baltinglass Hill to the west as well as several barrows there and in the valleys below. The landscape between the valley of River Slaney and Keadeen Mountain can be compared to Brú na Bóinne.

== History ==
Dwyer–McAllister Cottage is at the northern base of Keadeen at Derrynamuck, where Michael Dwyer, the 1798 rebellion United Irishmen leader, escaped from the British soldier's siege on Sam McAllister cottage in December 1799 up the slopes of the mountain.

== Bibliography ==
- MountainViews Online Database (Simon Stewart) (2013). A Guide to Ireland's Mountain Summits: The Vandeleur-Lynams & the Arderins. Collins Books. ISBN 978-1-84889-164-7.
- Dillion, Paddy (1993). The Mountains of Ireland: A Guide to Walking the Summits. Cicerone. ISBN 978-1852841102.

== See also ==
- Wicklow Way
- Wicklow Mountains
- Lists of mountains in Ireland
- List of mountains of the British Isles by height
- List of Marilyns in the British Isles
- List of Hewitt mountains in England, Wales and Ireland
