= Slievemaan =

Mountain in County Wicklow, Ireland

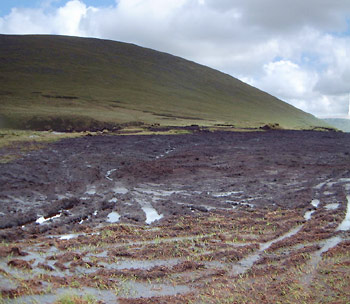

Highest point
- Elevation: 759 m (2,490 ft)
- Prominence: 54 m (177 ft)
- Listing: Hewitt, Arderin, Simm, Vandeleur-Lynam
- Coordinates: 52.958821°N 6.486565°W

Naming
- Native name: Sliabh Meáin

Geography
- Location within island of Ireland
- Location: County Wicklow, Ireland
- Parent range: Wicklow Mountains
- OSI/OSNI grid: T017918
- Topo map: OSi Discovery 56

Geology
- Mountain type(s): Dark slate-schist, quartzite & coticule

Slievemaan (Irish: Sliabh Meáin, meaning 'Middle mountain') at 759 metres (2,490 ft), is the 54th–highest peak in Ireland on the Arderin scale, and the 70th–highest peak on the Vandeleur-Lynam scale. Slievemaan is situated in the southwen sector of the Wicklow Mountains range, and is part of the large massif of Lugnaquilla 925 metres (3,035 ft), Wicklow's highest mountain. Slievemaan lies at the southern end of the Glen of Imaal.

To the west of Slievemaan is the subsidiary peak of Ballineddan Mountain 652 metres (2,139 ft), whose prominence of 27 metres (89 ft) qualifies it as a Vandeleur-Lynam.

Slievemann is sometimes confused with the other Wicklow mountain of Slieve Maan which is lower at 548 metres (1,798 ft).

== Bibliography ==
- Fairbairn, Helen (2014). Dublin & Wicklow: A Walking Guide. Collins Press. ISBN 978-1848892019.
- MountainViews Online Database (Simon Stewart) (2013). A Guide to Ireland's Mountain Summits: The Vandeleur-Lynams & the Arderins. Collins Books. ISBN 978-1-84889-164-7.
- Dillion, Paddy (1993). The Mountains of Ireland: A Guide to Walking the Summits. Cicerone. ISBN 978-1852841102.

== See also ==
- Wicklow Way
- Wicklow Round
- Wicklow Mountains
- Lists of mountains in Ireland
- List of mountains of the British Isles by height
- List of Hewitt mountains in England, Wales and Ireland
