= Corrigasleggaun =

Mountain in County Wicklow, Ireland

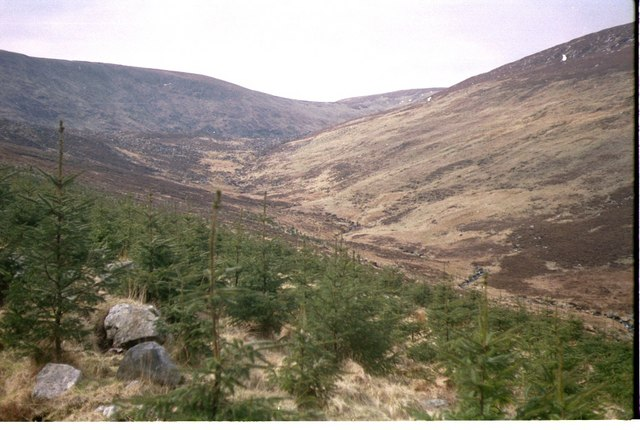
- Looking at summit from the glen of the Carrawaystick River

Highest point
- Elevation: 794 m (2,605 ft)
- Prominence: 49 m (161 ft)
- Listing: Hewitt, Arderin, Simm, Vandeleur-Lynam
- Coordinates: 52.960653°N 6.441245°W

Naming
- Native name: Carraig na Sliogán
- English translation: rock of the shells or flat stones

Geography
- Location within island of Ireland
- Location: County Wicklow, Ireland
- Parent range: Wicklow Mountains
- OSI/OSNI grid: T047910
- Topo map: OSi Discovery 56

Geology
- Mountain type: Aphyric granodiorite Bedrock

Corrigasleggaun (Irish: Carraig na Sliogán, meaning 'Rock of the shells') at 794 metres (2,605 ft), is the 35th–highest peak in Ireland on the Arderin scale, and the 45th–highest peak on the Vandeleur-Lynam scale. Corrigasleggaun is situated in the southwestern sector of the Wicklow Mountains range, and is part of the large massif of Lugnaquilla 925 metres (3,035 ft), County Wicklow's highest mountain. Corrigasleggaun lies at the head of the glen of the easterly flowing Carrawaystick River, which includes the scenic corrie lake of Kelly's Lough near its summit, and Carrawaystick Mountain at its base. Corrigasleggaun also lies alongside Lugnaquilla's South Prison, from which the River Ow flows south to the Aghavannagh Bridge.

== Bibliography ==
- Fairbairn, Helen (2014). Dublin & Wicklow: A Walking Guide. Collins Press. ISBN 978-1848892019.
- MountainViews Online Database (Simon Stewart) (2013). A Guide to Ireland's Mountain Summits: The Vandeleur-Lynams & the Arderins. Collins Books. ISBN 978-1-84889-164-7.
- Dillion, Paddy (1993). The Mountains of Ireland: A Guide to Walking the Summits. Cicerone. ISBN 978-1852841102.

== Gallery ==
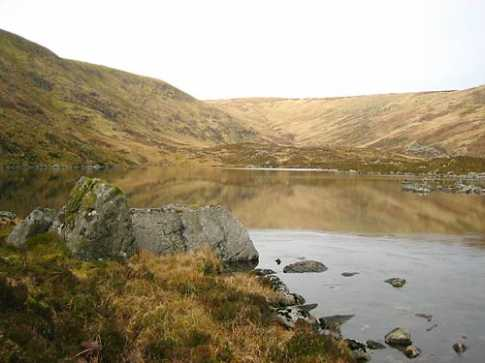
Kelly's Lough

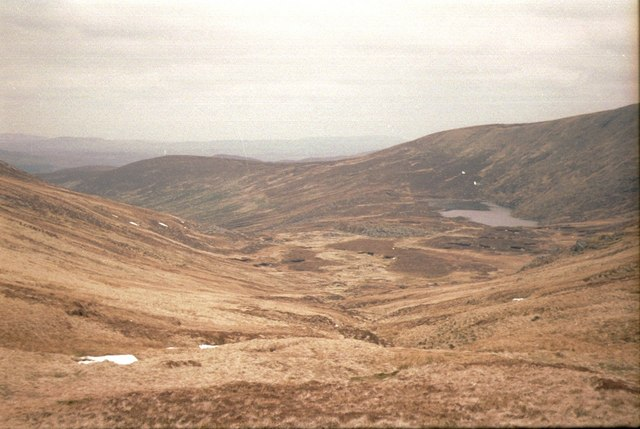
View from summit to Carraystick River

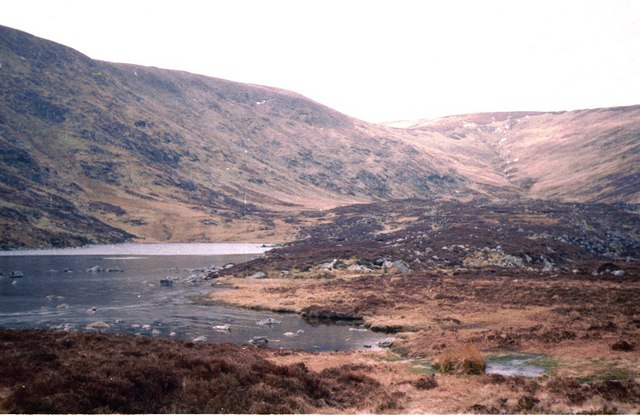
Kelly's Lough, summit behind

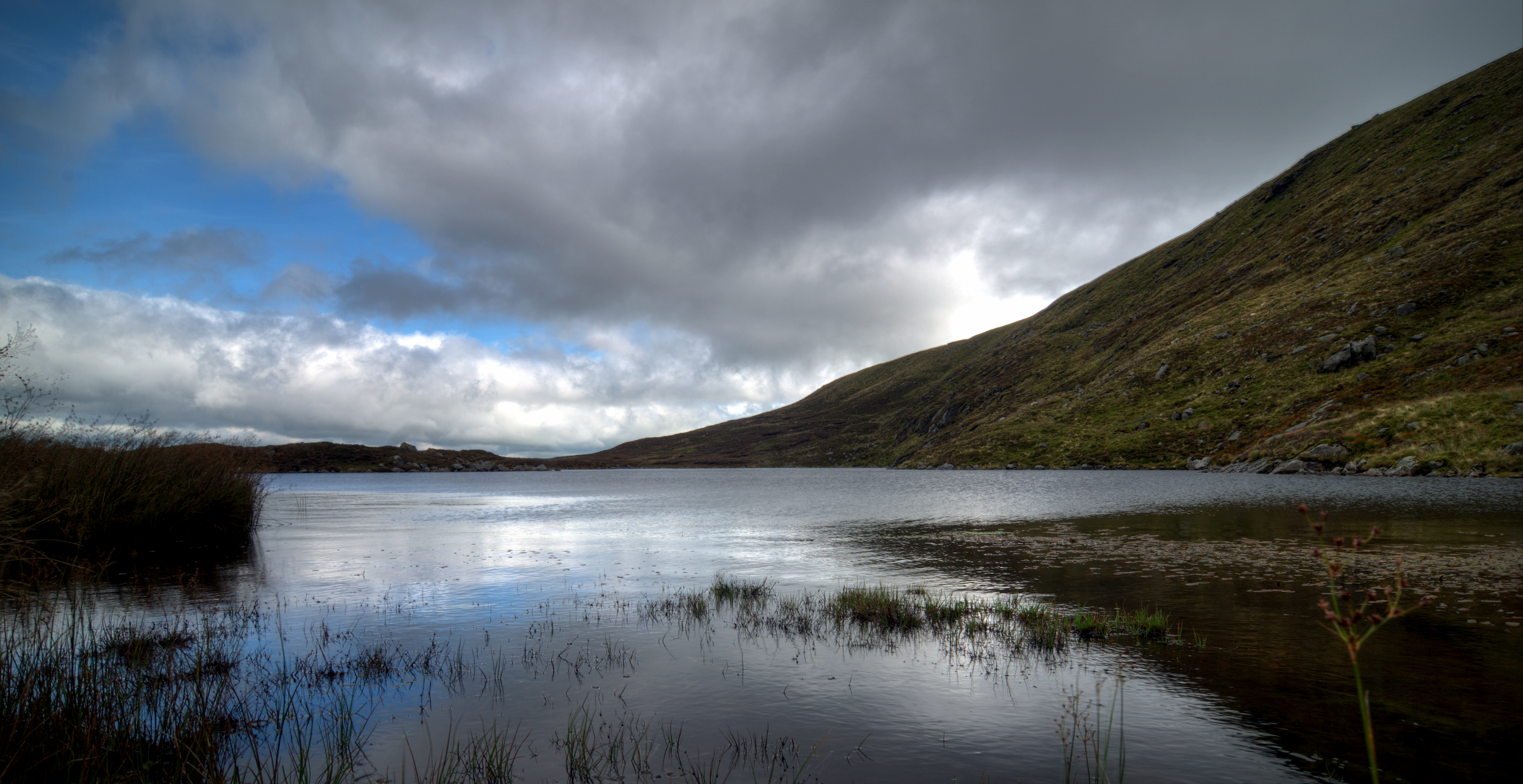
Kelly's Lough, looking east

== See also ==
- Wicklow Way
- Wicklow Round
- Wicklow Mountains
- Lists of mountains in Ireland
- List of mountains of the British Isles by height
- List of Hewitt mountains in England, Wales and Ireland
