= Lugnaquilla =

Mountain in Wicklow, Ireland

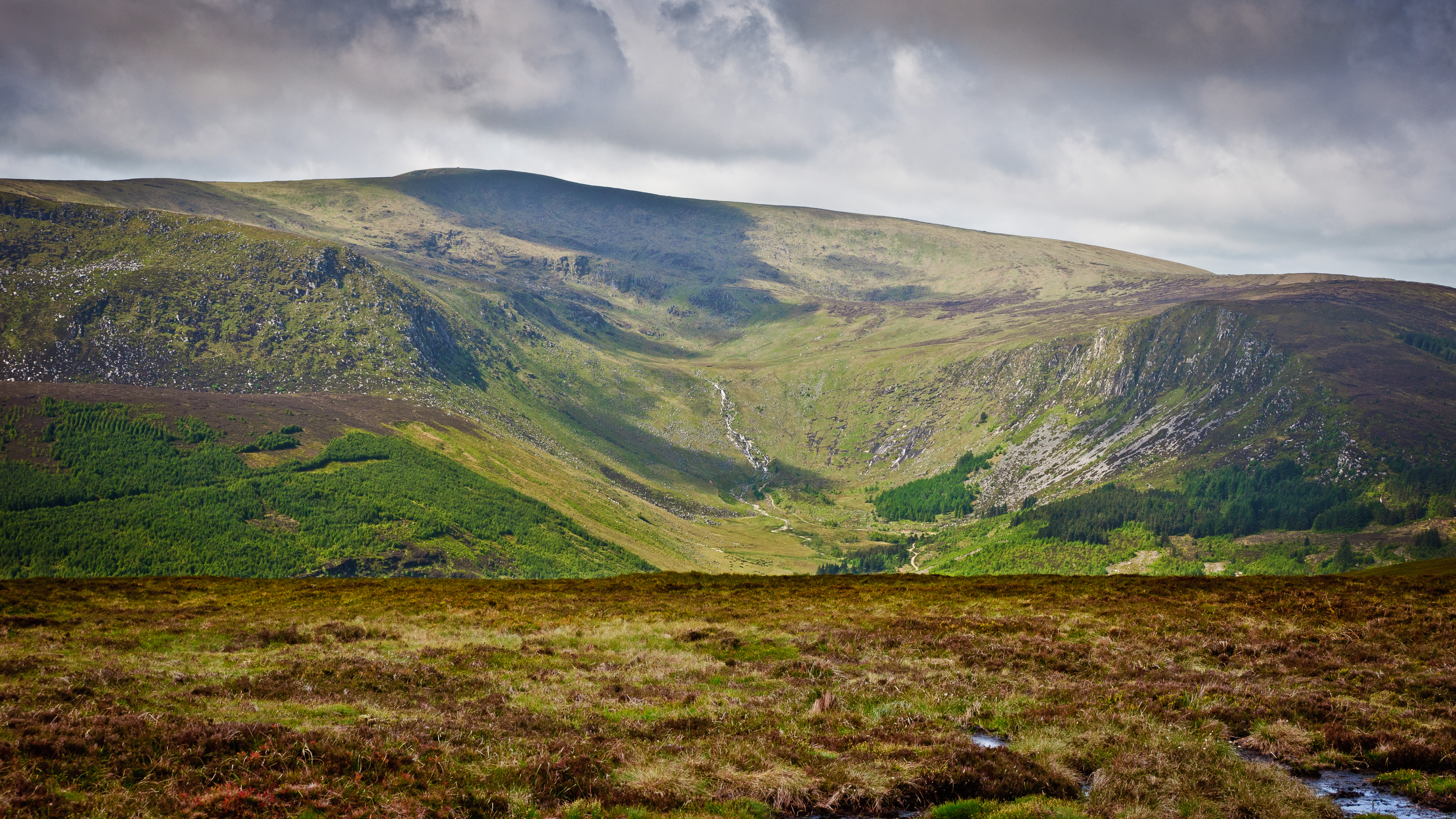
- Looking into the Fraughan Rock Glen (river) and the summit of Lugnaquilla (back, centre)

Highest point
- Elevation: 925 m (3,035 ft)
- Prominence: 905 m (2,969 ft)
- Listing: County top (Wicklow), P600, Marilyn, Furth, 100 Highest Irish Mountains, Hewitt, Arderin, Simm, Vandeleur-Lynam
- Coordinates: 52.96714°N 6.464618°W

Naming
- Native name: Log na Coille
- English translation: hollow of the wood

Geography
- Location within island of Ireland
- Location: County Wicklow, Ireland
- Parent range: Wicklow Mountains
- OSI/OSNI grid: T032917
- Topo map: OSI Discovery 56

Geology
- Mountain type(s): Aphyric granodiorite, (Percys Table Granodiorite)

Climbing
- Easiest route: Glen of Imaal Route

Lugnaquilla (Irish: Log na Coille, meaning 'hollow of the wood') is the highest of the Wicklow Mountains in Ireland, rising to 925 metres (3,035 ft). It is also the highest Irish mountain outside of County Kerry, and the highest point in County Wicklow and the province of Leinster. Lugnaquilla overlooks the Glen of Imaal to the west and Glenmalure to the east.

Lugnaquilla is also the 11th-highest peak in Ireland on the Arderin list and 13th-highest on the Vandeleur-Lynam list.

== Naming ==
Irish academic Paul Tempan wrote in his 2010 Irish Hill and Mountain Names, that the summit plateau is marked as Percy's Table, named after an 18th–century local landowner, Colonel Percy. This is similar to Dawson's Table on the summit of Galtymore. Tempan also notes that P.W. Joyce gave the original form as Log na Coilleach, which translates as "hollow of the (grouse) cocks", however, Tempan says that "this seems doubtful".

Tempan clarifies the name has no connection with the deity Lug, despite the common use of the term Lug as shorthand for Lugnaquilla, and that in some spellings of the name, several OS maps and guidebooks for example (e.g. Paddy Dillion's guidebooks), an "i" is added to give "Lugnaquillia"; however Tempan settles on "Lugnaquilla" as the proper name for the mountain.

== Geology ==
The Geological Survey of Ireland ("GSI") describe Lugnaquilla as a "slate capped, granite rooted, relatively flat-topped mountain". Crags of dark-grey schist protrude from the upper cliff walls of Lugnaquilla's corries which are Ordovician in age. The protrusions of lighter grey rock are granite. The cap of schist overlying Lugnaquilla's granite core is the remnant roof of the magma chamber into which the Lugnaquilla granites were emplaced. Cosmogenic dating on exposed bedrock showed that these schists were not covered by ice during the Last Glacial Maximum, and thus Lugnaquilla was a nunatak, a summit or ridge protruding above an ice field or glacier.

== Geography ==
Lugnaquilla is described as a "bulky mountain", with a large plateau-type grassy summit (known as Percy's Table), bounded on two sides by steep glacial corries (amphitheatre-shaped valleys) called the "North Prison" (looking into the Glen of Imaal), and the "South Prison" (looking into the glen of the River Ow). On Lugnaquilla's eastern side is the cliff-lined hanging valley of Fraughan Rock Glen, which falls into the glacial U-shaped valley of Glenmalure. The mountain is the source of the River Slaney.

Lugnaquilla does not have a rocky summit or summit ridges, and its large massif (principal mass) is described as a "sprawling mountain moorland". Its massif includes several major summits and corrie lakes, often lying in a "horseshoe-shape" with Lugnaquilla at the apex around deep valleys. Around the Fraughan Rock Glen and Arts Lough in the east are Benleagh and Clohernagh peaks; around the glen of the Carrawaystick River and Kelly's Lough in the southeast are Corrigasleggaun peak and, again, Clohernagh peak; around the glen of the River Ow in the south are Corrigasleggaun and Slievemaan peaks; and finally, around the larger Glen of Imaal in the west are Ballineddan Mountain, Slievemaan, Camenabologue, Table Mountain, Lobawn, and Sugarloaf peaks.

Lugnaquilla is the highest mountain of the Wicklow Mountains range, and the highest mountain in Ireland outside County Kerry. Its large prominence qualifies it to meet the P600 classification (mountains known as the "Majors" in Britain and Ireland), and the Britain and Ireland Marilyn classification. It is the fourth-highest mountain in the MountainViews Online Database, 100 Highest Irish Mountains.

Lugnaquilla is the 432nd-highest and 21st most prominent mountain in Britain and Ireland, on the Simms classification. It is regarded by the Scottish Mountaineering Club (SMC) as one of 34 Furths, which is a mountain above 3,000 ft (914 m) in elevation, and meets the other SMC criteria for a Munro (e.g. "sufficient separation"), but which is outside of (or furth) Scotland; which is why Lugnaquilla is referred to as one of the 13 Irish Munros.

== Hill walking ==
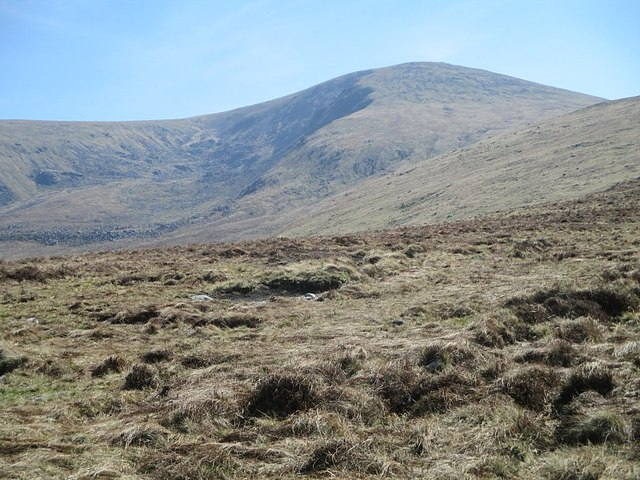
Looking into the "north prison" of Lugnaquilla from Camarahill in the Glen of Imaal.

The shortest route to the summit of Lugnaquilla is the 13-kilometre, four-to-five hour Glen of Imaal Route (the "Tourist Route"), that starts at Fenton's Pub in the Glen of Imaal, and goes along the military access road via a grassy hill to Camarahill (S998924) 480 metres (1,570 ft), and then up to the summit of Lugnaquilla. The route crosses into the military artillery range, so walkers should check the range operating times in advance.

The 15-kilometre, five-to-six hour Glenmalure Loop is described as "the most scenic circuit to Lugnaquilla". It starts in the Baravore car park (T066942) at the head of Glenmalure and summits Lugnaquilla via the cliff-fringed hanging valley, Fraughan Rock Glen (the Glen is entered by the path at the Glenmalure Hostel); but returning via Cloghernagh 800 metres (2,600 ft), and down to the scenic Arts Lough 511 metres (1,677 ft), described as "one of the region's most beautiful sights", before descending back to the start of the Fraughan Rock Glen (or descending by Kelly's Lough and the glen of the Carrawaystick River).

The third, and least frequented route is the 16-kilometre, six-hour Aghavannagh Route, which starts at the Aghavannagh Bridge (T056861) and follows the long forest tracks along the River Ow to the dramatic "South Prison" of Lugnaquilla, which is exited by the grassy ramp of Green Street; return by the same route. The 12 kilometres of forest trails (getting to the south prison, and then on the return to the bridge) can be cycled instead.

== Gallery ==
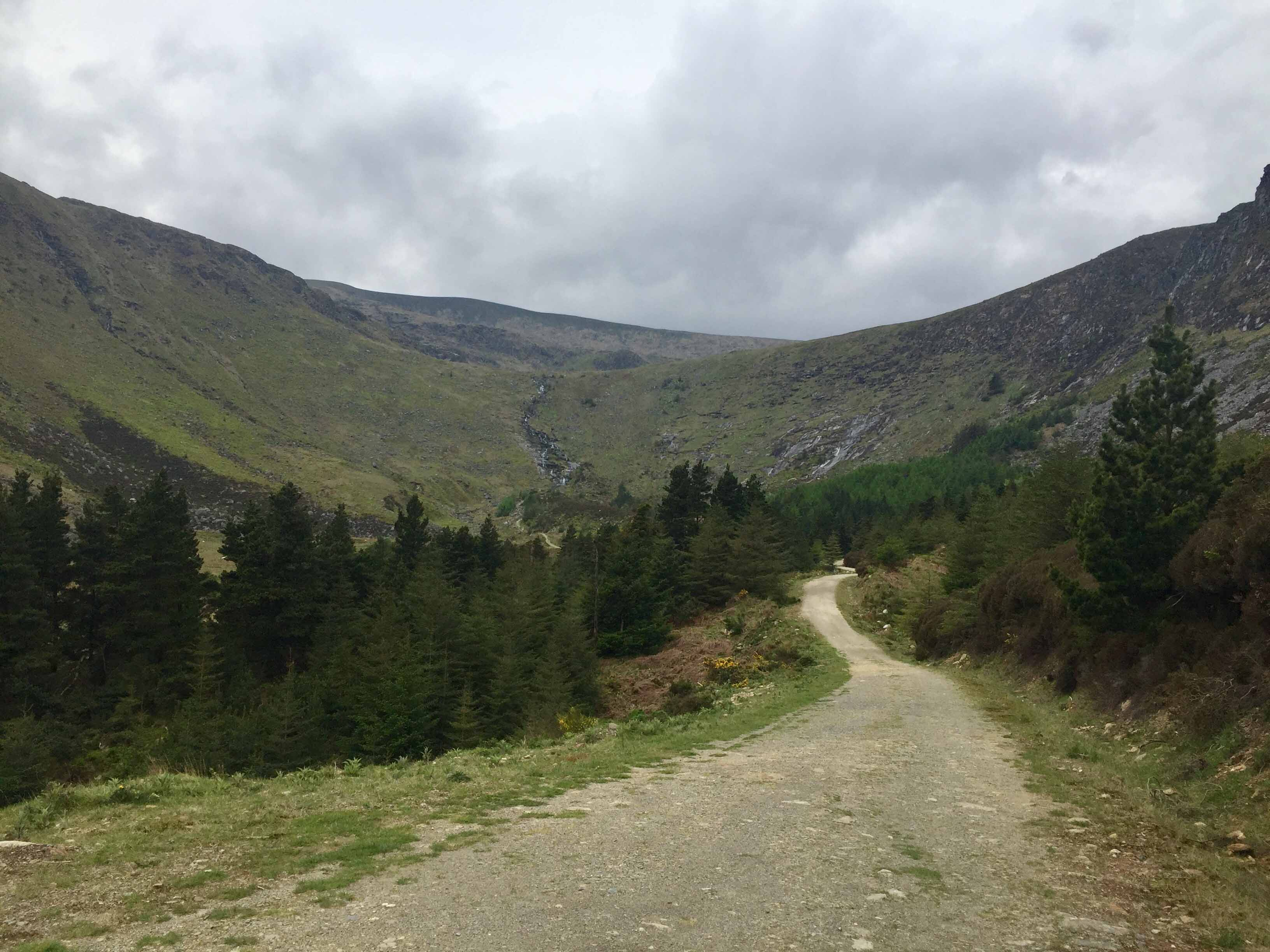
Summit of Lugnaquilla from the Fraughan Rock Glen path

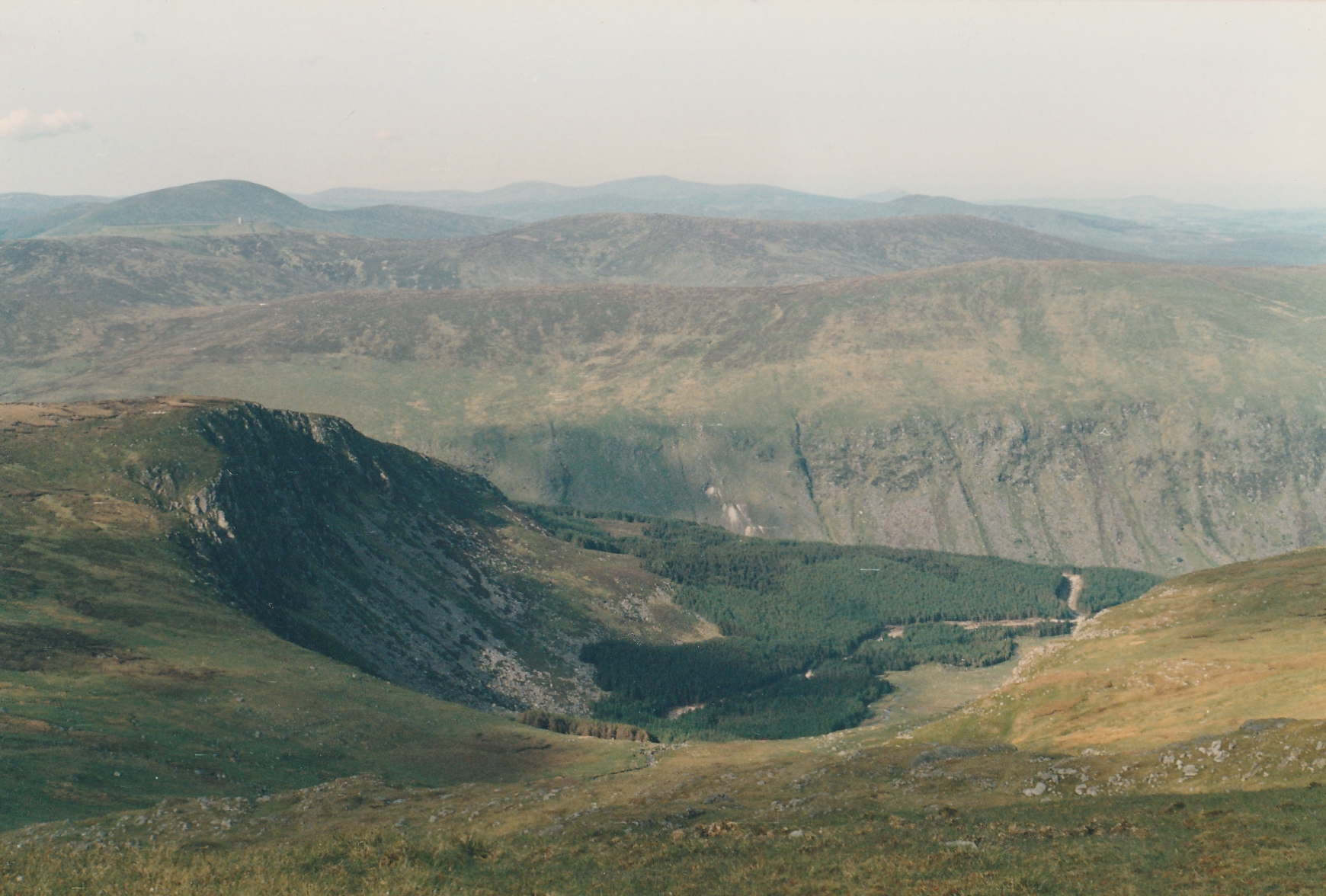
Fraughan Rock Glen

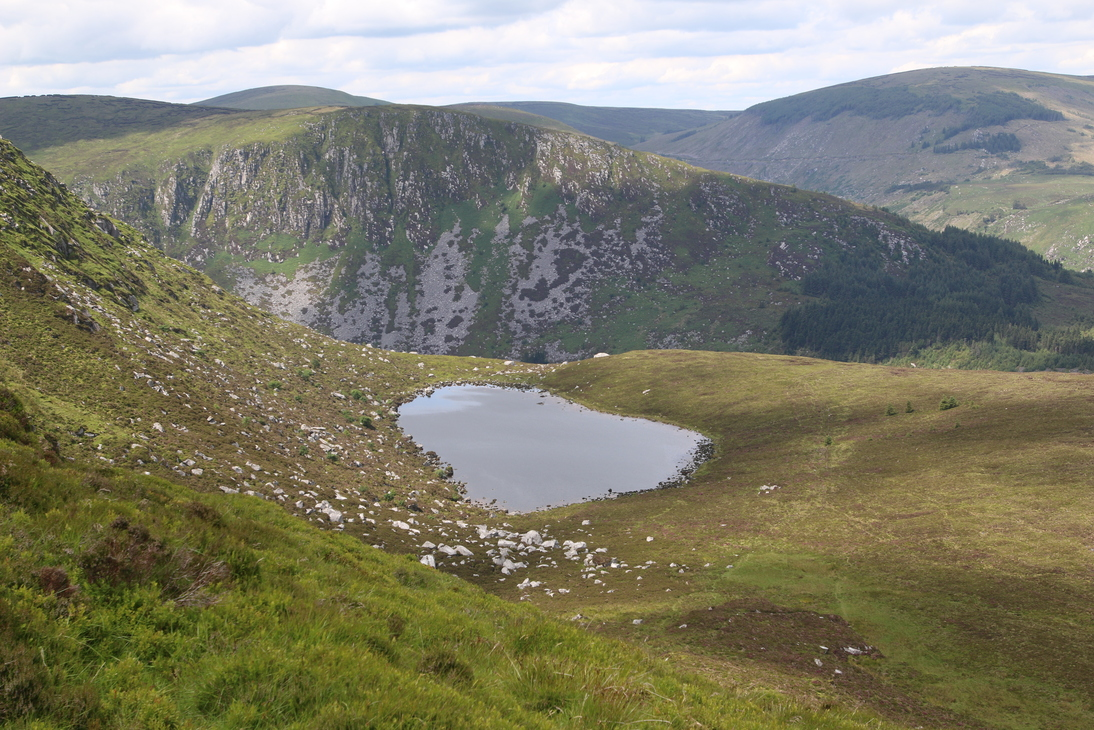
Arts Lough below the summit of Lugnaquilla, looking across the Fraughan Rock Glen

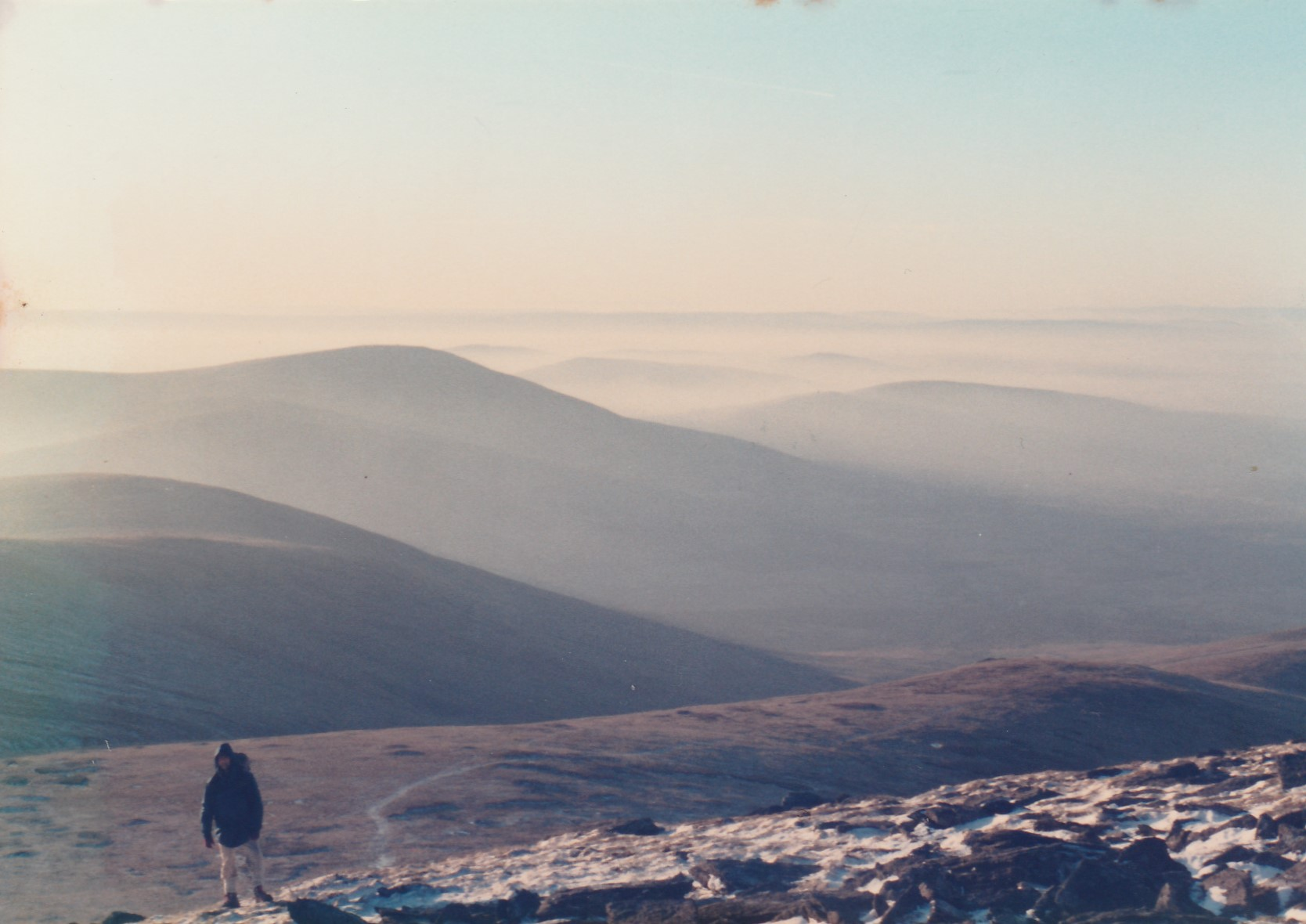
Slopes of Lugnaquilla, December 1985

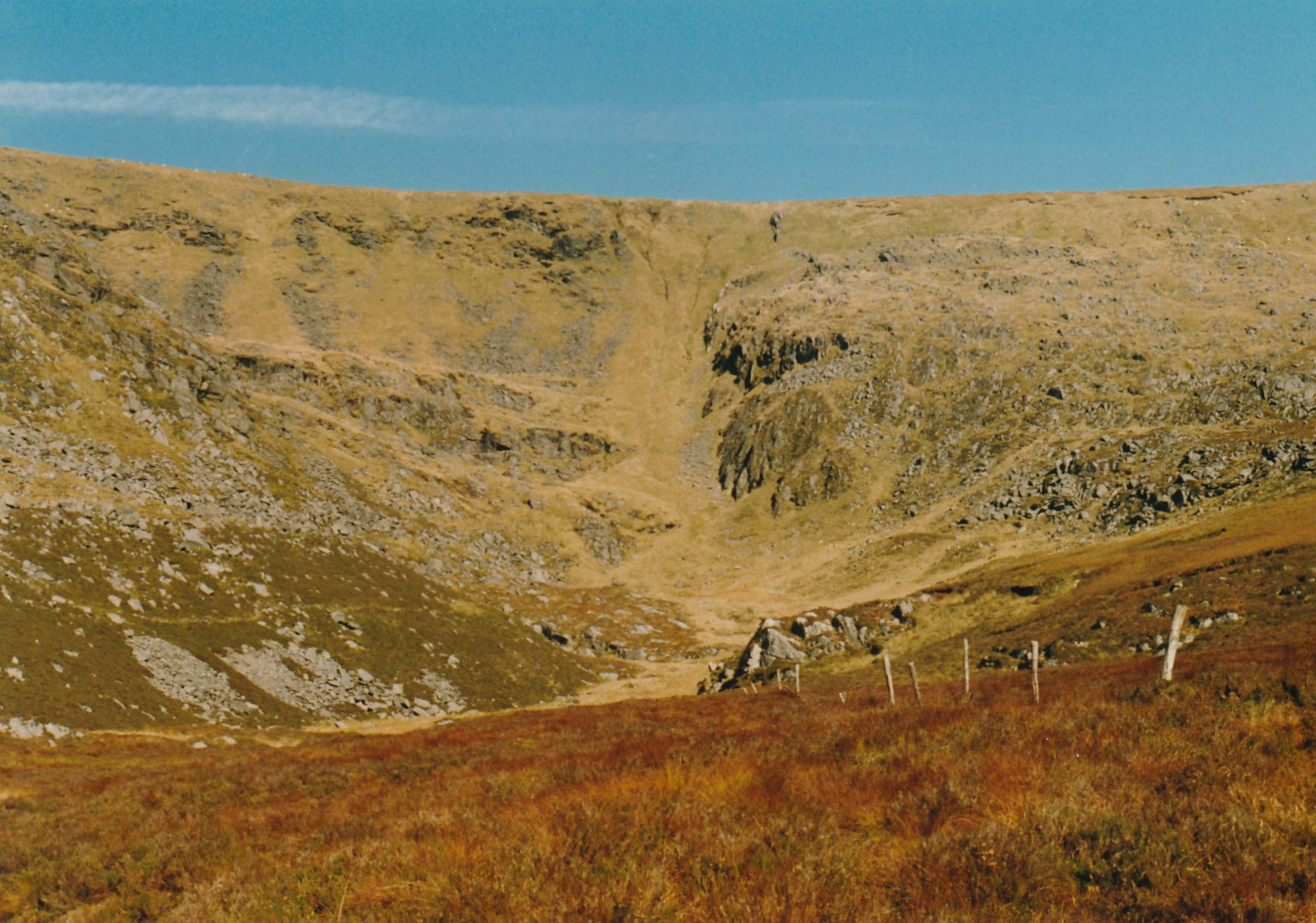
Looking north into the south prison

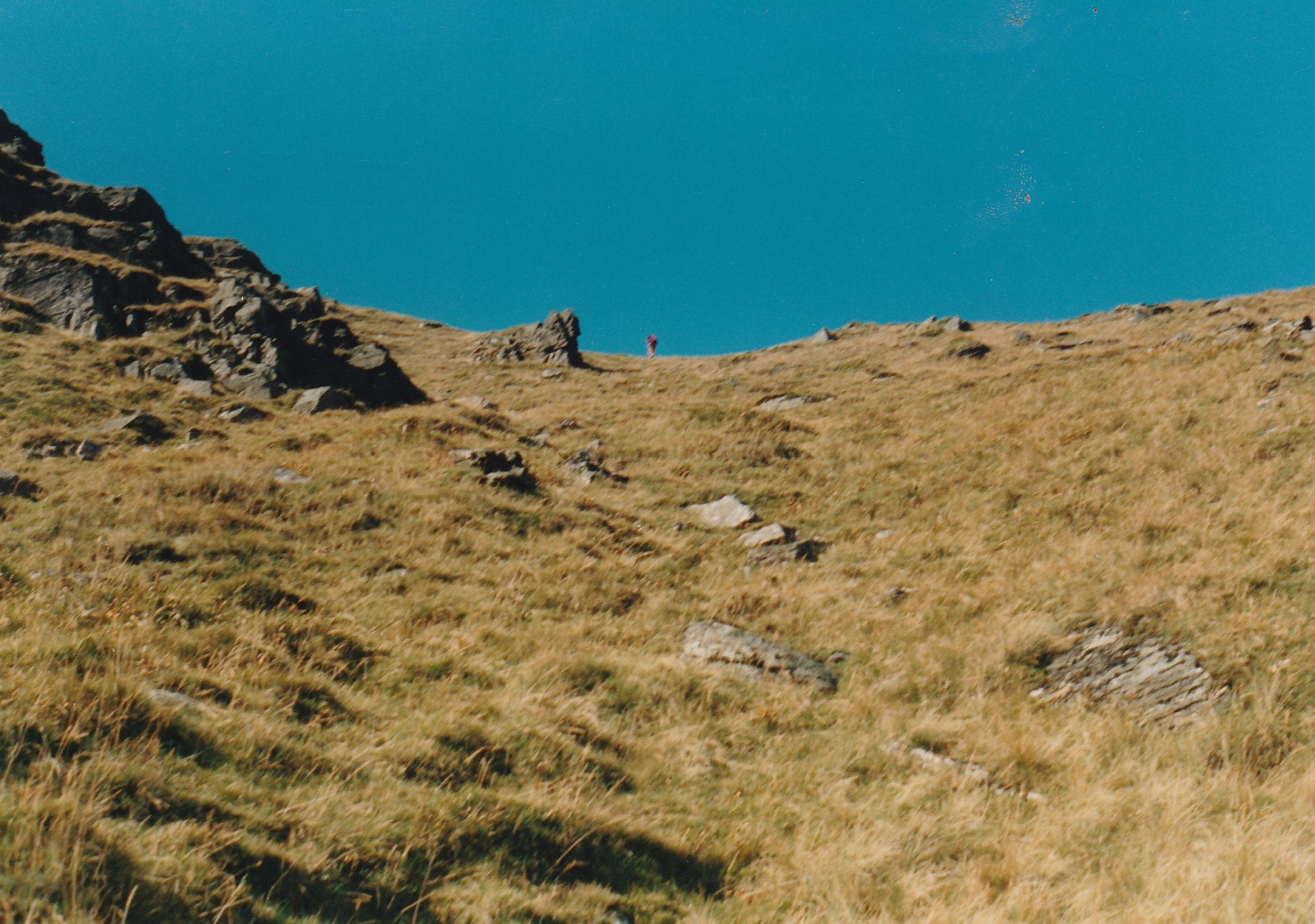
Steep slopes of the south prison

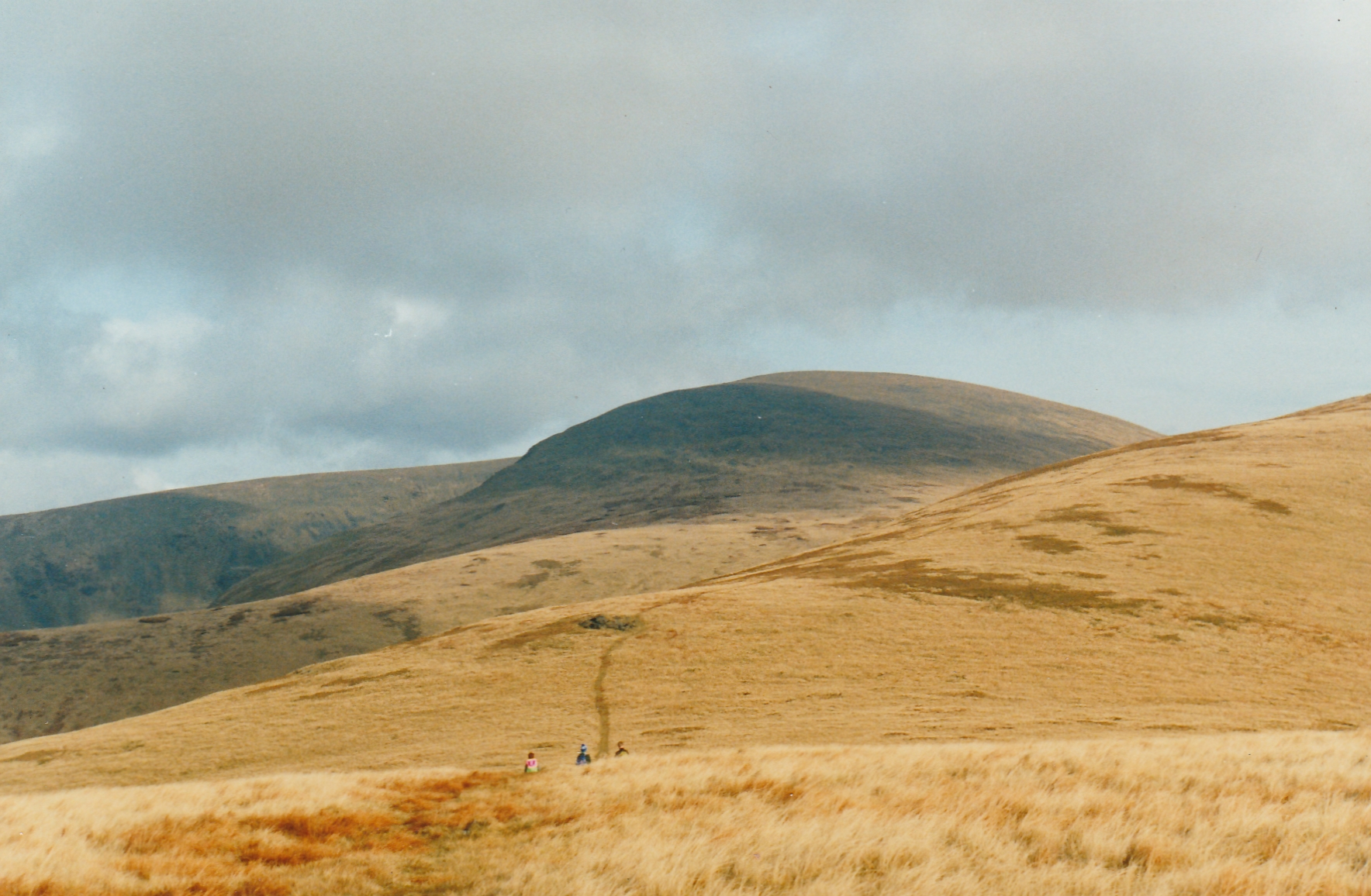
Autumn on the mountain

== Bibliography ==
- Fairbairn, Helen (2014). Dublin & Wicklow: A Walking Guide. Collins Press. ISBN 978-1848892019.
- Fairbairn, Helen (2014). Ireland's Best Walks: A Walking Guide. Collins Press. ISBN 978-1848892118.
- MountainViews Online Database (Simon Stewart) (2013). A Guide to Ireland's Mountain Summits: The Vandeleur-Lynams & the Arderins. Collins Books. ISBN 978-1-84889-164-7.
- Dillion, Paddy (2005). Irish Coast to Coast : Dublin to Bray Head. Cicerone Press. ISBN 978-1852844332.
- Dillion, Paddy (1993). The Mountains of Ireland: A Guide to Walking the Summits. Cicerone Press. ISBN 978-1852841102.

== See also ==
- Wicklow Way
- Wicklow Round
- Lists of mountains in Ireland
- List of Irish counties by highest point
- List of mountains of the British Isles by height
- List of P600 mountains in the British Isles
- List of Furth mountains in the British Isles
