= Glen of Imaal =

Valley in the Wicklow Mountains, Ireland

Coordinates: 53°0′32″N 6°27′55″W

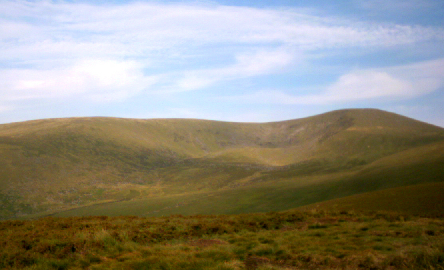
Lugnaquilla forms the eastern boundary of the Glen of Imaal

The Glen of Imaal (/ˈɪmɑːl/ or /ˈiːmɑːl/; Irish: Gleann Uí Mháil) is a remote glen in the western Wicklow Mountains in Ireland. It is ringed by the Lugnaquilla massif and its foothills, including Table Mountain and Keadeen. Much of the valley is used by the Irish Army as an artillery firing range, and hill walkers who use the glen are advised to observe the times of firing practice and to refrain from picking up strange objects.

The Glen of Imaal is the subject of an eponymously titled Irish folk song, and also the place of origin of the eponymous dog breed, the Glen of Imaal Terrier.

== History ==
=== Early history ===
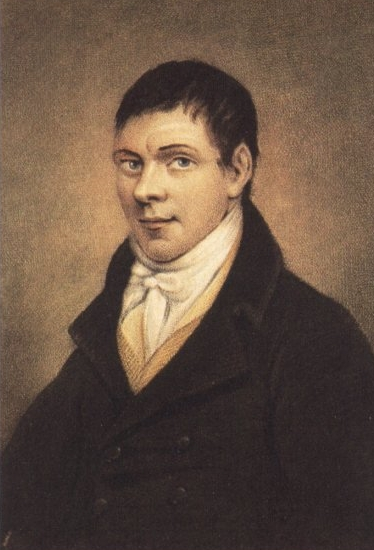
Michael Dwyer, a leader of the Rebellion of 1798

The Glen of Imaal is named after the Uí Máil, who dominated the kingship of Leinster in the 7th century. They were ousted by the Uí Dúnlainge from the lowlands of what later became County Kildare, and from that time until the early 13th century were located along the western foothills of the Wicklow mountains. The valley appears to have been a centre of their power. By the 14th century, O'Tuathail (O'Toole) (of the Uí Dunlainge) had taken the lordship of the Uí Máil, having in their turn been expelled from south Kildare by Norman incomers.

Derrynamuck in the Glen of Imaal is a cottage dedicated to the memory of Michael Dwyer, a celebrated leader of the Irish Rebellion of 1798. It is now known as the Dwyer–McAllister cottage, for it was there that a group of Irish rebels led by Dwyer were hiding when they were surrounded by British forces. Samuel McAllister died when he drew enemy fire to allow Dwyer to escape.

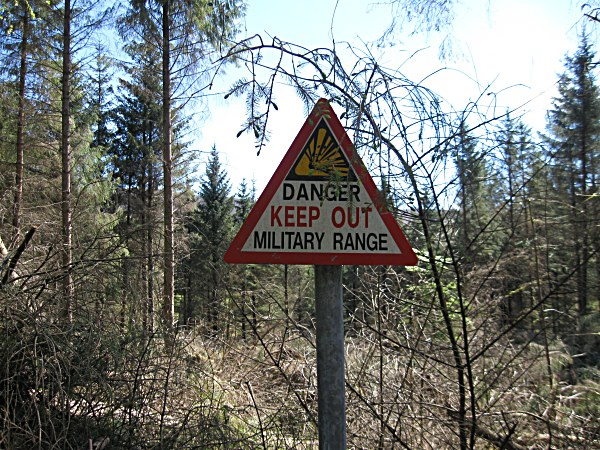
Warning sign close to the military range

=== Military use ===
Since 1900, much of the Glen of Imaal (5,948 acres) has been used as an army artillery range. Because of this, caution is advised when attempting to use areas within the army range, and notices are posted as to when the army are on field exercises.

=== 1941 disaster ===
On 16 September 1941, the glen was the site of the worst single incident involving loss of life in the history of the Irish Defence Forces. This incident, known as the Glen of Imaal Disaster, occurred during a training exercise involving 27 officers and men from the army's anti-aircraft battalion, artillery school, and corps of engineers. Sixteen soldiers were killed when an antitank mine unexpectedly exploded (15 dying immediately, and one later succumbing to his wounds). Other injured soldiers were rushed to the Curragh military hospital where several received surgery. Three men were fully blinded in the accident, and two more, partially. One survivor later murdered two men in Dublin in 1947 but was found "guilty but insane". A memorial to the disaster was raised near Seskin Bridge in 1986.

=== 1977 incident ===
In May 1977, five soldiers were killed and three were injured when a mortar detonated unexpectedly during a training exercise.

=== 1979 incident ===
On 15 April 1979, a fatal accident occurred in the glen when a group of teenagers from Lucan who were engaging in an orienteering activity triggered an explosive which subsequently detonated, killing three and seriously injuring others. The resultant inquiry found that the explosive was an unexploded shell which had been left in the region by the military during one of their exercises. Bobby Molloy, the Minister for Defence, issued a statement in Dáil Éireann expressing his "personal regret" about the incident, and encouraged members of the public to avoid replicating the "tragic occurrences" by avoiding the area entirely to not encounter the shells. The deceased were buried in Esker Cemetery and are commemorated annually at mass services in Lucan.

== Firing range ==
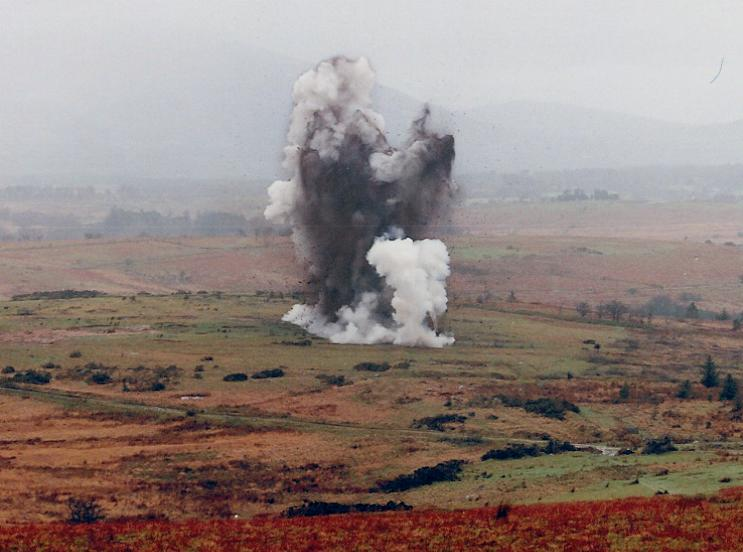
Detonation of explosives in the Glen of Imaal by the Irish Army Corps of Engineers

The Glen of Imaal firing range is used throughout the year by the Irish Army as a training area. It is the only range in the country capable of accommodating field artillery such as the 105mm Light Gun. The range area is also used for firing anti-tank weapons, mortars and heavy machine guns, as well as the vehicle-mounted weapons of the Cavalry Corps. Military training in the area is not limited to the firing of heavy weapons. Tactical exercises also take place there, sometimes involving Mowag armoured personnel carriers and Irish Air Corps helicopters. Exercises in peacekeeping operations are also undertaken in the glen.

Care is advised while driving on local roads due to the presence of heavy military traffic, and questions have been raised concerning the effects of military exercises on residents and the safety of other road users in the area.

Units using the area are sometimes billeted in the nearby Coolmoney Camp. This camp, previously associated with Coolmoney House (which was built in the 1830s and demolished in the 1990s), was used by the British Army's Royal Field Artillery until taken over by the Irish Army's Artillery Corps in the 1920s.

== Mountain climbing ==
The highest mountain in Wicklow and one of the highest mountains in Ireland, Lugnaquilla (925 metres), is on the southeastern end of the glen. The Glen of Imaal Red Cross Mountain Rescue Team was formed in 1983, and serves the area in partnership with Dublin-Wicklow Mountain Rescue Team.

== See also ==
- List of Irish military installations
