= Castlegregory =

Village in County Kerry, Ireland

Castlegregory Caisleán Ghriaire
- Village
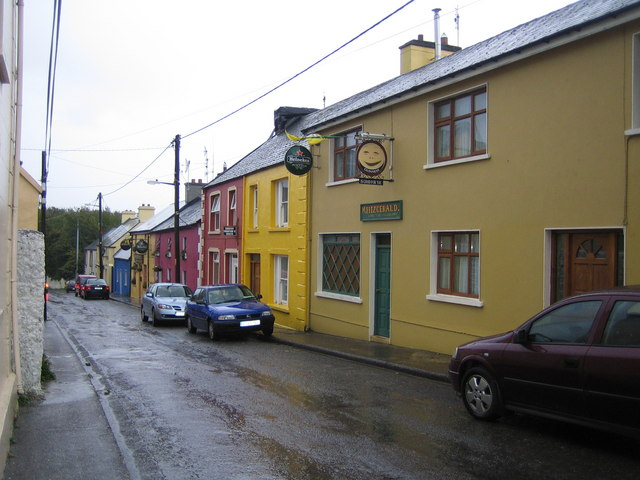
- Main Street, Castlegregory

- Location in Ireland
- Coordinates: 52°15′20″N 10°01′16″W
- Country: Ireland
- Province: Munster
- County: County Kerry

Population (2022)
  - Total: 370
- Time zone: UTC+0 (WET)
  - Summer (DST): UTC-1 (IST (WEST))
- Irish Grid Reference: Q617134

Castlegregory (Irish: Caisleán Ghriaire, meaning "castle of Griaire") is a village in County Kerry, Ireland. It is situated on the north side of the Dingle Peninsula, halfway between Tralee and Dingle. As of the 2022 census, Castlegregory had a population of 370.

Castlegregory was named after a castle built by Gregory Hoare in the 16th century. It is the principal village in Lettragh, the name given to the northern side of the Dingle Peninsula.

== Geography ==
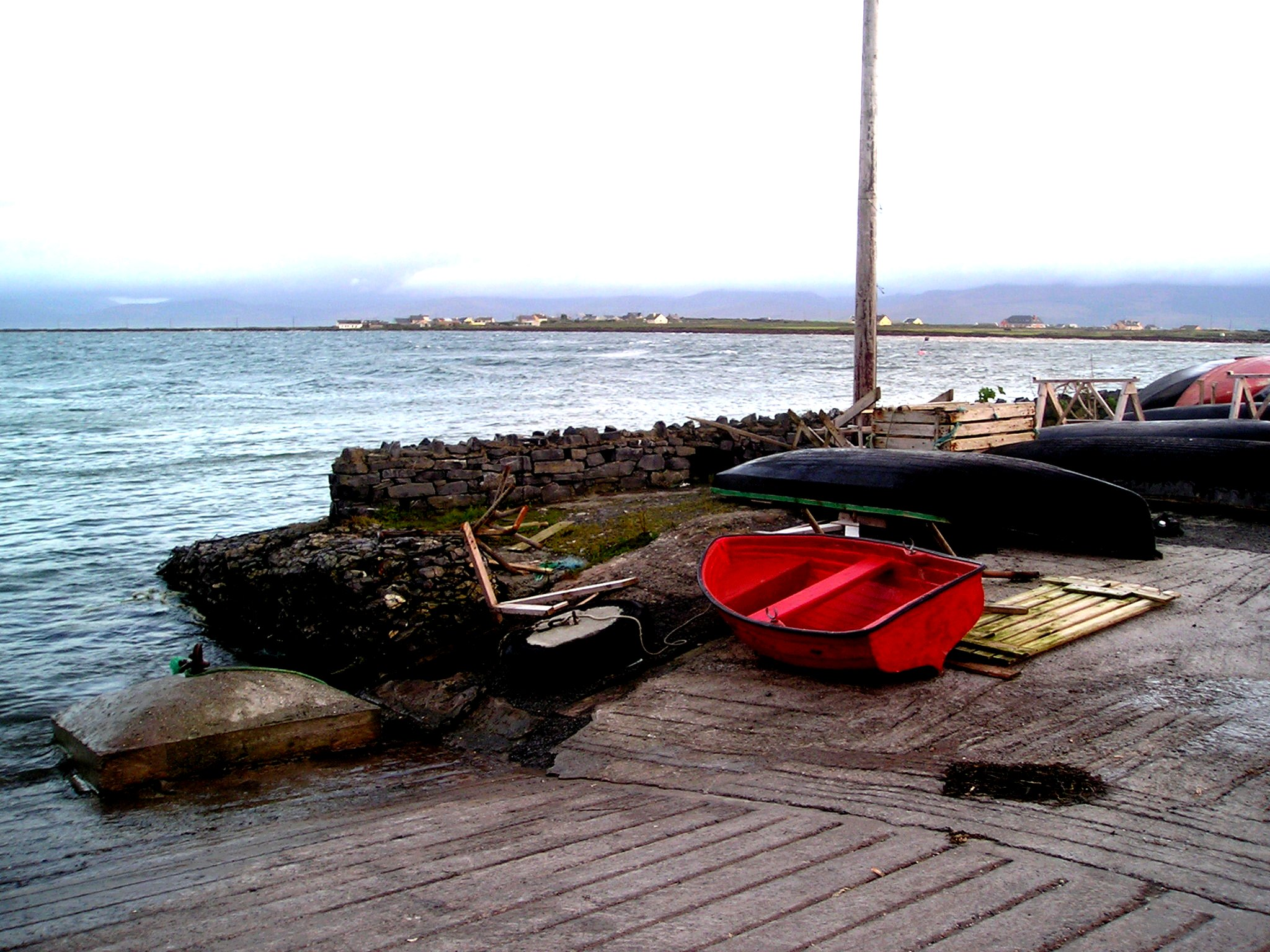
Dockside, north of Castlegregory.

The village is located at the foot of a sandy peninsula called the Maharees separating Brandon Bay to the west from Tralee Bay on the east. Off the peninsula are a number of small islands, called the Seven Hoggs, or the Maharee Islands. A small fishing harbour is located at Fahamore on Scraggane Bay, about 5 km outside the village at the tip of the Maharees peninsula. The village is surrounded by the mountains of the Dingle peninsula and overlooked directly by Beenoskee and Stradbally Mountains. To the west is Mount Brandon. Castlegregory is also the name of a Roman Catholic parish that includes parts of the northeast area of the Dingle Peninsula and is served by two churches. The village is a tourist destination and it is near to a number of beaches located on the Maharees peninsula. Castlegregory Golf and Fishing Club, a nine-hole links golf course, is located to the west of the village on the shores of Lough Gill.

== History ==
On the largest of the Magharee Islands, Illauntannig (Irish: Oileán tSeanaigh) are the ruins of a 7th-century monastic site founded by St Senach. On this site there are two oratories, three beehive (or Clochan) huts, and three examples of a leacht (or altar).

== Local events ==
Castlegregory Pattern Day was traditionally celebrated on 15 August, when the tradition is to eat locally made mutton pies. In recent years it has been expanded into a three-day summer festival.

Wren's Day on 26 December is also celebrated. The traditional straw dresses have given way to pyjamas, curtains, Halloween masks, and Christmas decorations, but there is still traditional Irish music to be heard.

== Sport ==
Castlegregory GAA Club was first known as Castlegregory Allen, named after William Allen, one of the Manchester Martyrs. The club took part in the first Kerry County Championship played in 1889. For over 40 years football was played on a pitch with a 21 feet gradient from top to bottom, however, a new ground was opened on 17 May 2003.

== Transport ==
Castlegregory was the terminus of a branch line of the Tralee and Dingle Light Railway. The railway station opened on 1 April 1891, and closed for passenger traffic on 17 April 1939. It connected to the main Tralee - Dingle route at Castlegregory Junction (near Camp). While this main route closure stopped passenger traffic, it was to remain open for a once-daily goods train until 1947, after which nothing but a monthly Tralee - Dingle cattle train operated until the main line's final closure in 1953.

== See also ==
- List of towns and villages in Ireland
- Stradbally, County Kerry
