= Mountains of the Dingle Peninsula =

Mountains of the Dingle Peninsula may refer to:

- Brandon Group, a mountain range in the western Dingle peninsula
- Mountains of the Central Dingle Peninsula, a mountain range in the central Dingle peninsula
- Slieve Mish Mountains, a mountain range in the eastern Dingle peninsula
