= Fahamore =

Village in County Kerry, Ireland

Fahamore An Fhaiche Mhór
- Townland
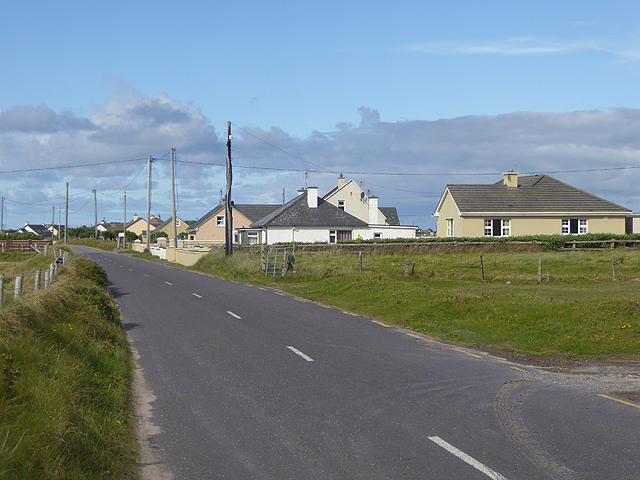
- Seaside bungalows at Fahamore

- Location in Ireland
- Coordinates: 52°18′11″N 10°02′24″W
- Country: Ireland
- Province: Munster
- County: County Kerry
- Time zone: UTC+0 (WET)
  - Summer (DST): UTC-1 (IST (WEST))
- Irish Grid Reference: Q608187

Fahamore (Irish: An Fhaiche Mhór, meaning 'the big green') is a townland and small village on the Maharees peninsula in County Kerry. It consists of about 50 houses and a pub. Fahamore is located on the shore of Brandon Bay and is a centre for diving, surfing, windsurfing and sea bass fishing. It is also a centre for currach building, and currachs are still used locally, including at the local fishing harbour at Scraggane.

== Name ==
The original Irish name of Fahamore, An Fhaiche Mhór, means the 'big green'. This may refer to the large open green area in front of Spillane's bar. A list of local placenames and their origins is contained in the book Triocha-Céad Chorca Dhuibhne by Pádraig Ó Siochfhradha (An Seabhac).

== History ==
Evidence of ancient settlement in the area includes a number of shell midden, standing stone, souterrain and castle sites in the townlands of Fahermore, Kilshannig and Garrywilliam. A description of the area's middens is found in the Archaeological Survey of the Dingle Peninsula (1986) by Judith Cuppage.

Local oral histories tell of a night in 1839, known as the Night of the Big Wind, when there was a particularly bad storm.

A three masted sailing ship, the Charger, carrying a cargo of deal, was wrecked in Carralougha in 1890 - the remains of the ship's boilers are still in evidence on the rocks near Fahamore at low tide.

A sea wall was built, probably in the 19th century, to prevent coastal erosion - it had limited success, as it now lies in pieces about 20m from the cliff edge - in the 1990s rock armour was put in place by Kerry County Council to protect the coast from Fahamore southwards for a distance of about two kilometers.

The Fahamore area was historically more populated than it is now, and there were two old schoolhouses in the village, one dating from 1849 and the other from 1911. In 1946 there were 84 houses in the village, occupied by 384 people who mostly run family farms with no additionally employed labour. The farmed crop was mostly potatoes, carrots, onions, and beetroot; the primary fertilizer was seaweed. As of the 2011 census, Fahamore townland had a population of 122. At the time of the census, in April 2011, 47 houses in the townland were occupied, while 44 were vacant.

== Geography ==
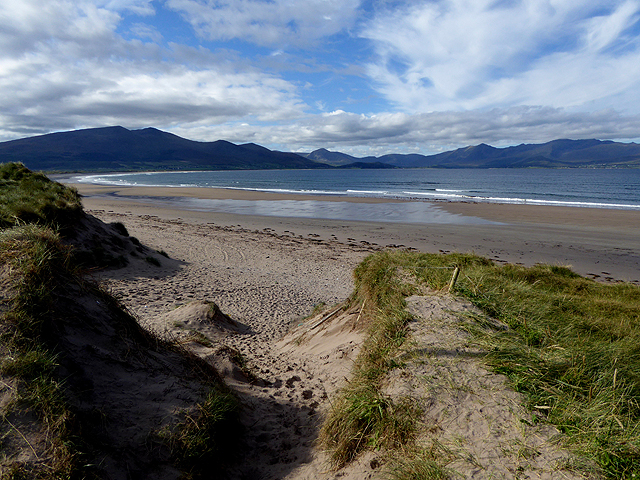
Brandon Bay near Fahamore

Townlands and villages near Fahamore, on the Maharees peninsula, include Cutteen, Garrywilliam, Barr na Duiche, Ceann Duiche and Kilshanig. Access to the beach at Brandon Bay is via the Point Gap and Maherabeg Cut.

== Economy ==
=== Fishing ===
The pier at Fahamore (situated on the western side of Scraggane Bay) is used during the summer months by the local fishing fleet, which consists of around 20 half-decked and decked boats in the range 7–15 metres. Species fished include the European lobster (Homarus gammarus), spiny lobster or crayfish, spider crab, edible crab, and Atlantic salmon (Salmo salar). In the winter there is a managed fishery in Tralee Bay for the European oyster (Ostrea edulis).

Fishing methods include pots and tangle nets for crabs, lobsters and crayfish and monofilament drift nets for salmon. Shellfish are typically stored in large wooden "storeboxes", which are moored in Scraggane Bay, until the day of selling, when they are transferred to "vivier" trucks for live export to Spain and France.

The "fish pond" at Kilshanig, which was originally intended to store lobsters, is now used as an abalone farm.

=== Agriculture ===
The fields around Fahamore are cultivated with vegetables including carrots, parsnips, swedes and onions, which thrive in the sandy soil. There has is also some dairying activity and raising of cattle for beef.

=== Tourism ===
Tourism is a contributor to the local economy, through holiday home rentals, pubs and restaurants, surfing, windsurfing, scuba diving, walking and sea angling.

Fahamore is also a centre for currach (or naomhóg) building, and currachs are still used as both fishing boats and trawler tenders at the local fishing harbour on Scraggane Bay. Fahamore hosts a currach racing regatta every July where teams from the western seaboard of Ireland (from Kerry to Galway) compete in the All-Ireland Currach racing series.

== Flora and fauna ==
Rabbits abound around Fahamore, as do rats, mice and the odd fox and badger. Local birds include seabirds (including several species of seagull, shags, cormorants, and gannets), larks, starlings, curlews, crows, ravens, garden birds such as sparrows, robins and finches, and wading birds such as the heron. The swallow is a common visitor in the summer months.

Marine mammals including seals and dolphins are sometimes seen. Fish include sea bass, mullet, pollack, wrasse, dogfish, sea trout, flounder, plaice and ray. Shellfish found in the intertidal zone at Fahamore include mussels, limpets, periwinkles and whelks, as well as several species of crab, including shore, velvet and hermit.

Lugworms are found in the sand, and their casts may be seen at low tide. They are used by local anglers as bait for bass. Seaweeds include kelp, several varieties of wrack (including bladder and serrated), dillisk (or dulse), agar, sea grass, sea lettuce and carrageen moss.

== See also ==
- List of towns and villages in Ireland
