= Kilshannig Graveyard =

Historical site in Ireland

- Cill Seanaigh
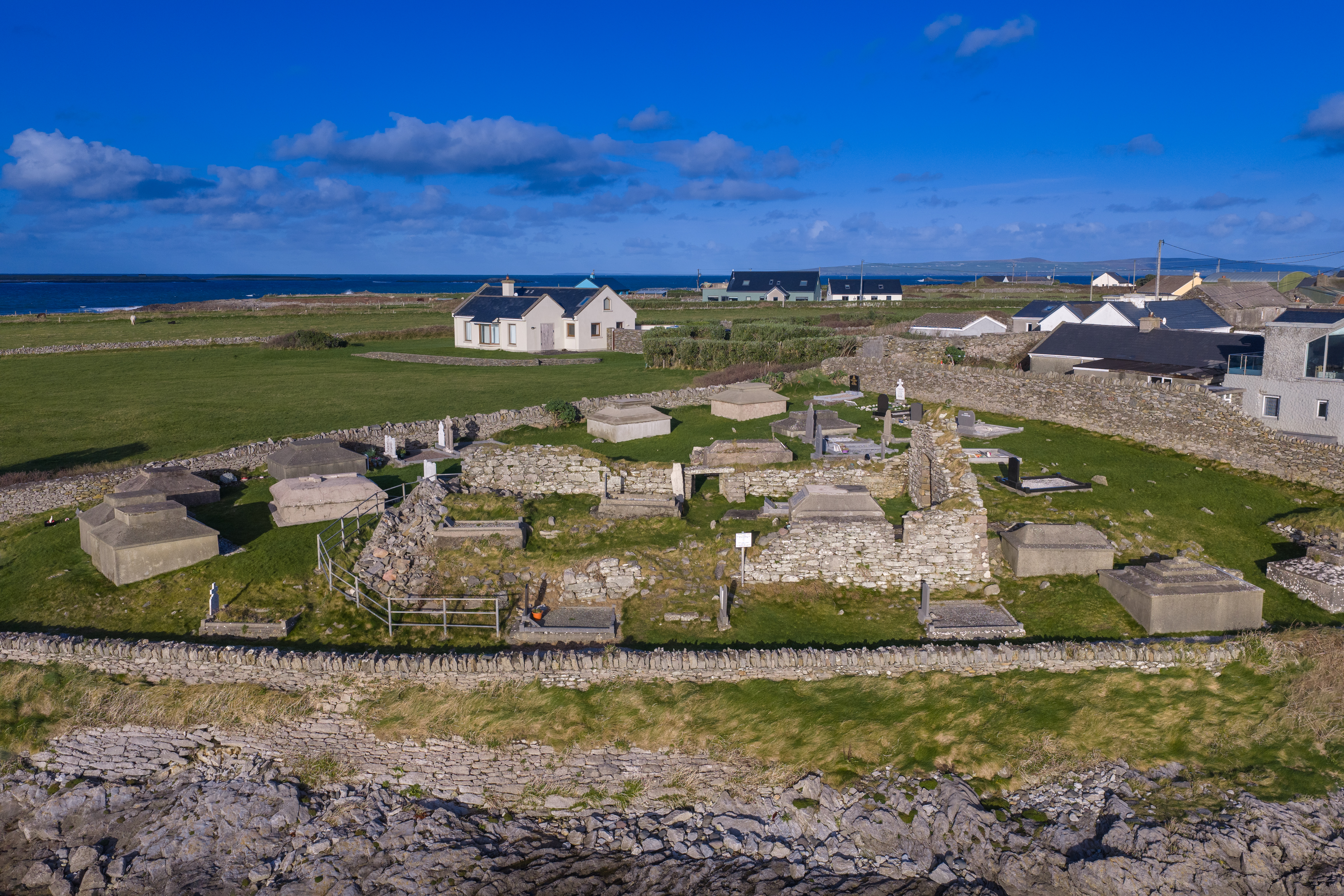
- South-west view of the graveyard
- Interactive map of Kilshannig Graveyard

Details
- Location: Kilshannig, County Kerry
- Country: Ireland
- Coordinates: 52.31014°N 10.01652°W
- Type: Church and graveyard; (Record of Monuments and Places KE027-002)

Kilshannig Graveyard (Irish: Cill Seanaigh), is an early medieval burial site and church ruin on the Magharees peninsula in County Kerry, Ireland.

== Site description ==
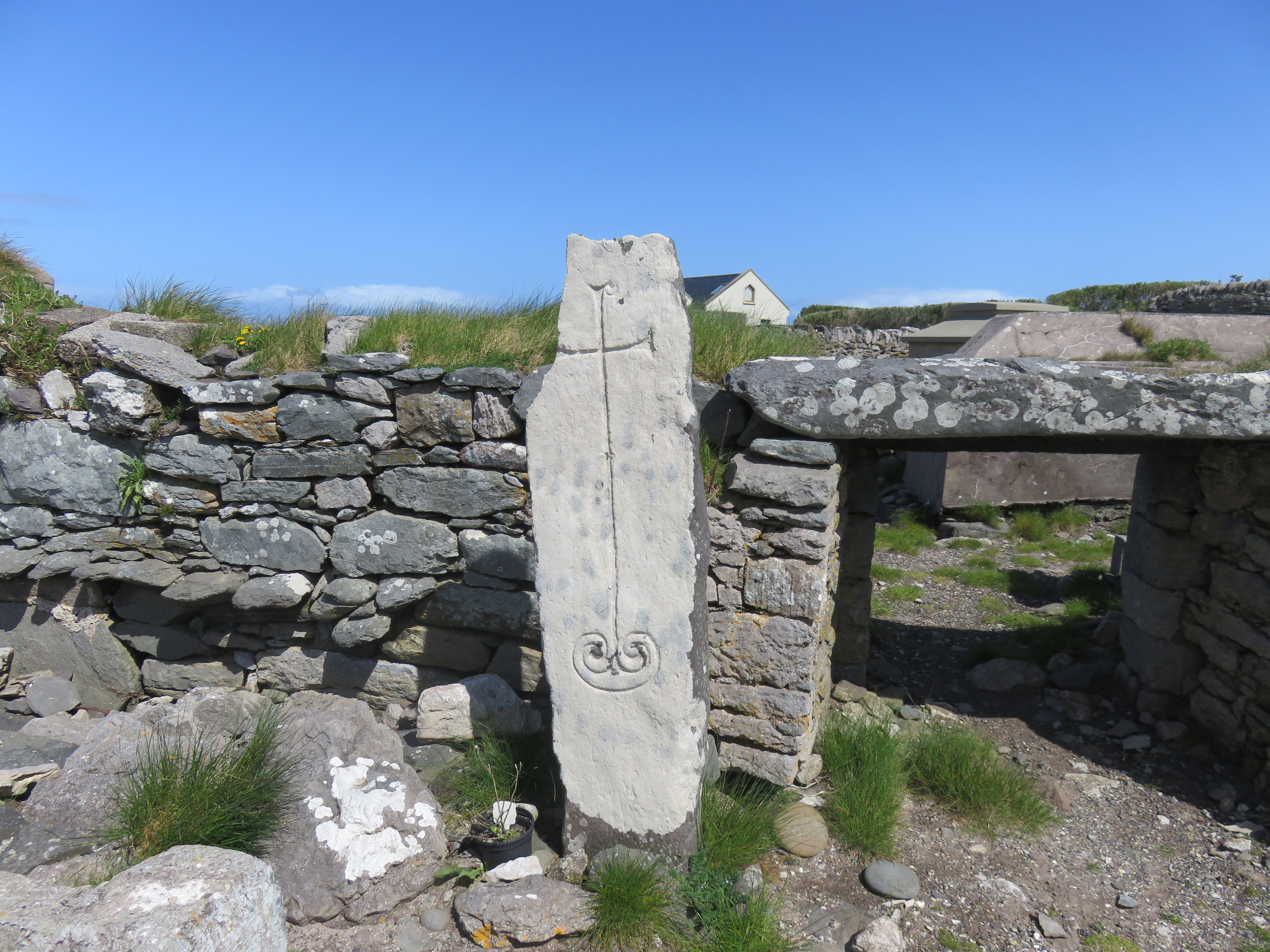
Early Christian slab with Chi Rho cross

The church and graveyard are situated near the shoreline on the east side of the Magharees's Scraggane Bay, at the eastern tip of the tombolo. A panoramic view of the Magharees itself, as well as Dingle Peninsula's three mountain ranges, extends from the site.

The old church is in ruin, with lower courses of the east gable and north wall remaining. Based on a survey done in 1841, when the church had already been long in disrepair, the walls were "two and a half feet thick but no more than five feet high".

There are 18 tombs and 51 headstones in the graveyard, with some of them situated within the church's ruins.

=== Chi-rho cross slab ===
Against the northern wall of the church, a vertical slab is positioned with Chi Rho cross inscribed — a significant feature of the site, and one of the artifacts pointing to its much earlier origins. The stone is 1.42m tall, 42cm wide at its widest, and 26cm thick. It is one of about only 15 found in Ireland, with a large proportion of them on Dingle peninsula. Based on how the cross is drawn (with "scrolled palmette" and the chi-rho), the stone may confidently be assigned to seventh or even late sixth century.

Other features suggesting early Christian history of the place include some of the slabs remaining in the existing walls.

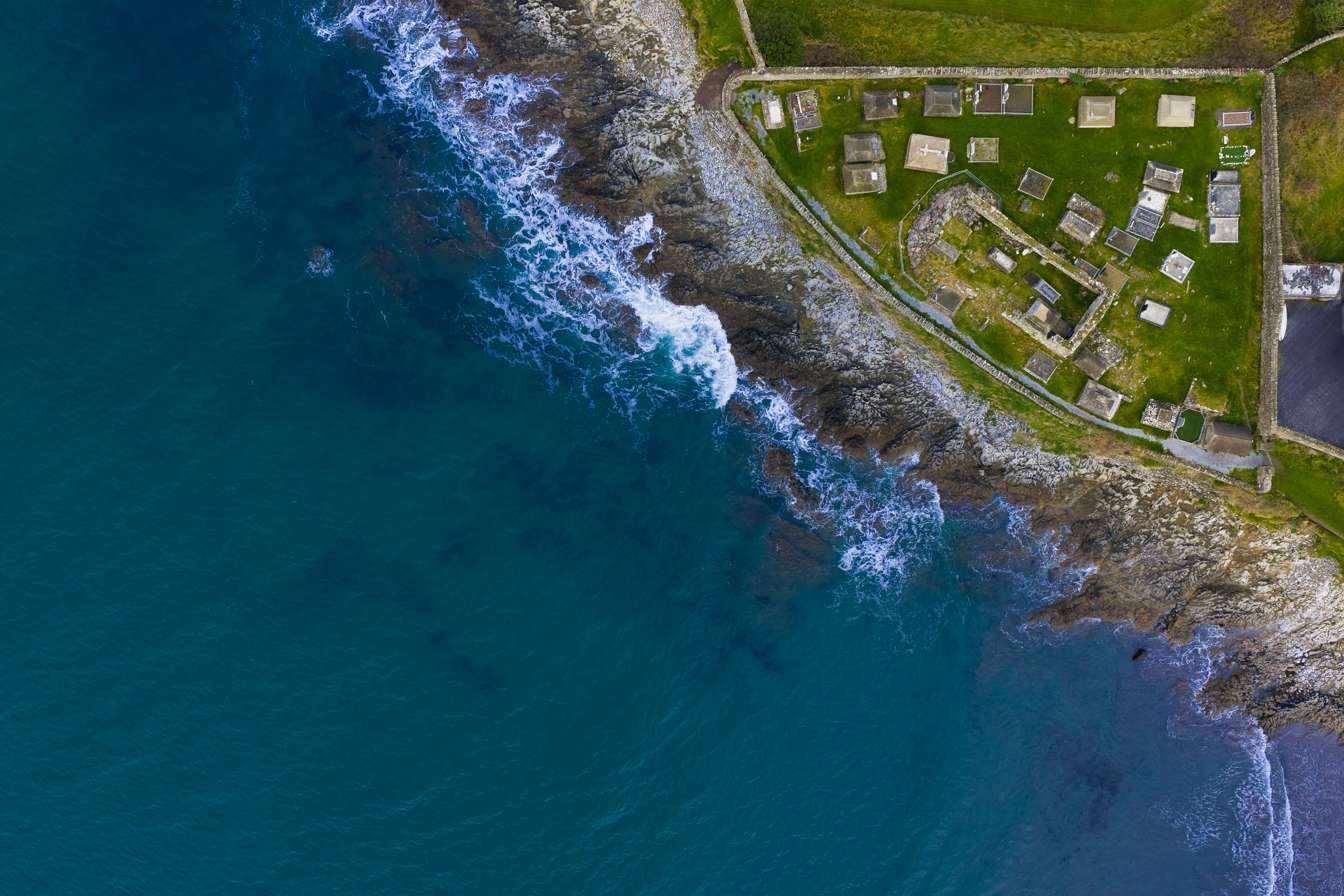
The triangular shape of the site in nadir view

== History and relationship to Illauntannig ==
The medieval church on the site is associated with the 7th century saint Senach, who in turn is also associated with the Illauntannig Monastic Site located on an island 1.5 km north. There are speculations that Kilshannig was the mainland church for the Illauntannig monks, and a legend exists of the cross slab being frequently moved between these two sites.

There is a record of a parish church existing on the site in 1302, but by 1473 it had "long been void". The currently existing ruins are of a later, high-medieval period (15th or 16th century), but appear to have been built on a much earlier 7th century site.
