= Stradbally, County Kerry =

Civil parish in County Kerry, Ireland

Coordinates: 52.2443°N 10.0623°W

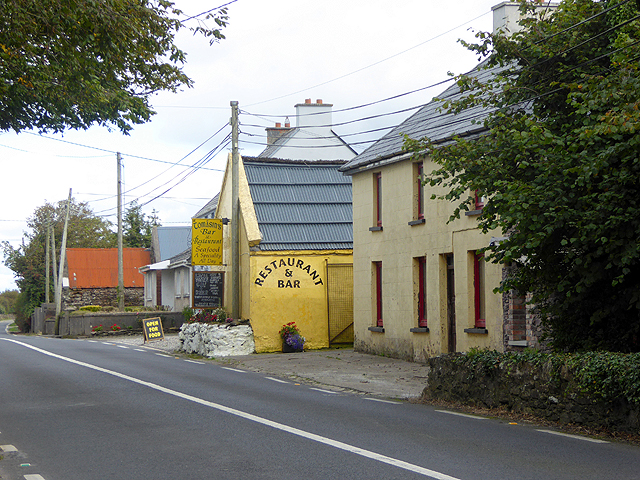
Tomasin's Restaurant and Bar, Stradbally

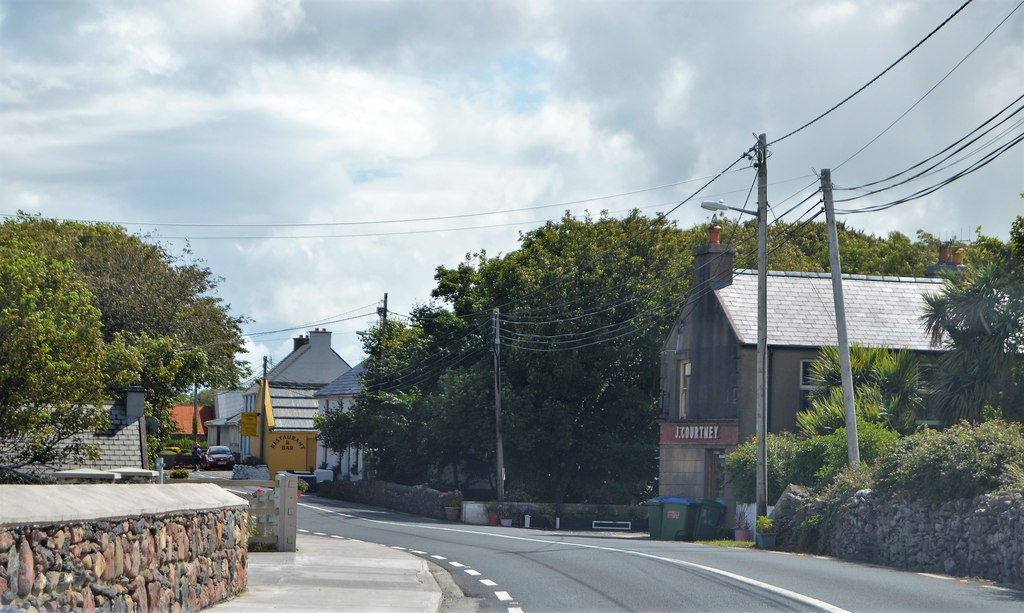
The R560 regional road passes through Stradbally

Stradbally (Irish: An Sráidbhaile, meaning 'the village') is a small village and civil parish on the Dingle Peninsula in County Kerry, Ireland. The larger village of Castlegregory is nearby.

The townlands of Ardbeg, Barrack and Farrantooleen, within the civil parish, contain a number of holy well, standing stone, churchyard and ring fort sites. The churchyard at Ardbeg contains the ruins of a late 15th or early 16th century church.

== See also ==
- Stradbally Mountain
