= Illauntannig Monastic Site =

Early christian site in Ireland

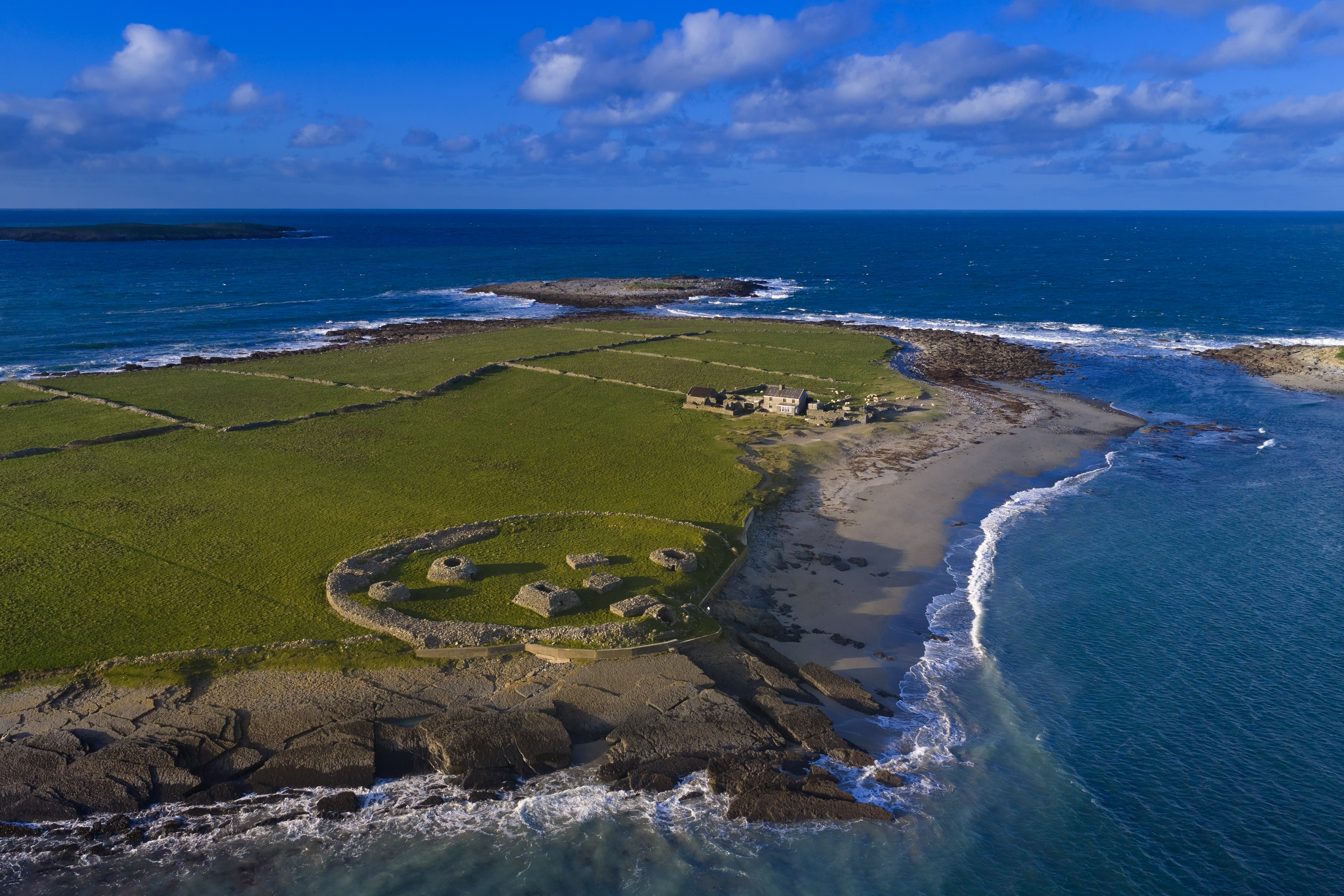
- Aerial view of the site
- Interactive map of Illauntannig Monastic Site

Monastery information
- Other name: Illauntanning Monastic Site
- Order: Early Christian
- Established: sources vary between 5th, 6th and 7th century

People
- Founder: St. Sennach

Architecture
- Status: Inactive
- Style: Dry-stone structures

Site
- Location: Illauntannig island, County Kerry, Ireland
- Coordinates: 52.32632°N 10.02005°W
- Public access: No

Illauntannig Monastic Site is an early medieval monastic site on Illauntannig, one of the Maharee islands in County Kerry, Ireland. It overlooks the Tralee Bay and the Maharees.

== Name and founder ==
The name of the island, Illauntannig (sometimes spelled as Illauntanning), comes from Irish Oileán tSeanaig (the island of St. Seanach), that is from the monastic settlement itself. The site was founded by St. Seanach, brother of the more widely known Senán mac Geirrcinn who was associated with a different island, Inis Cathaigh in the Shannon River estuary. It is suggested that the Illauntannig settlement should be considered a part of the same larger monastic presence on Irish islands as that on Skellig Michael, Inishmurray and others.

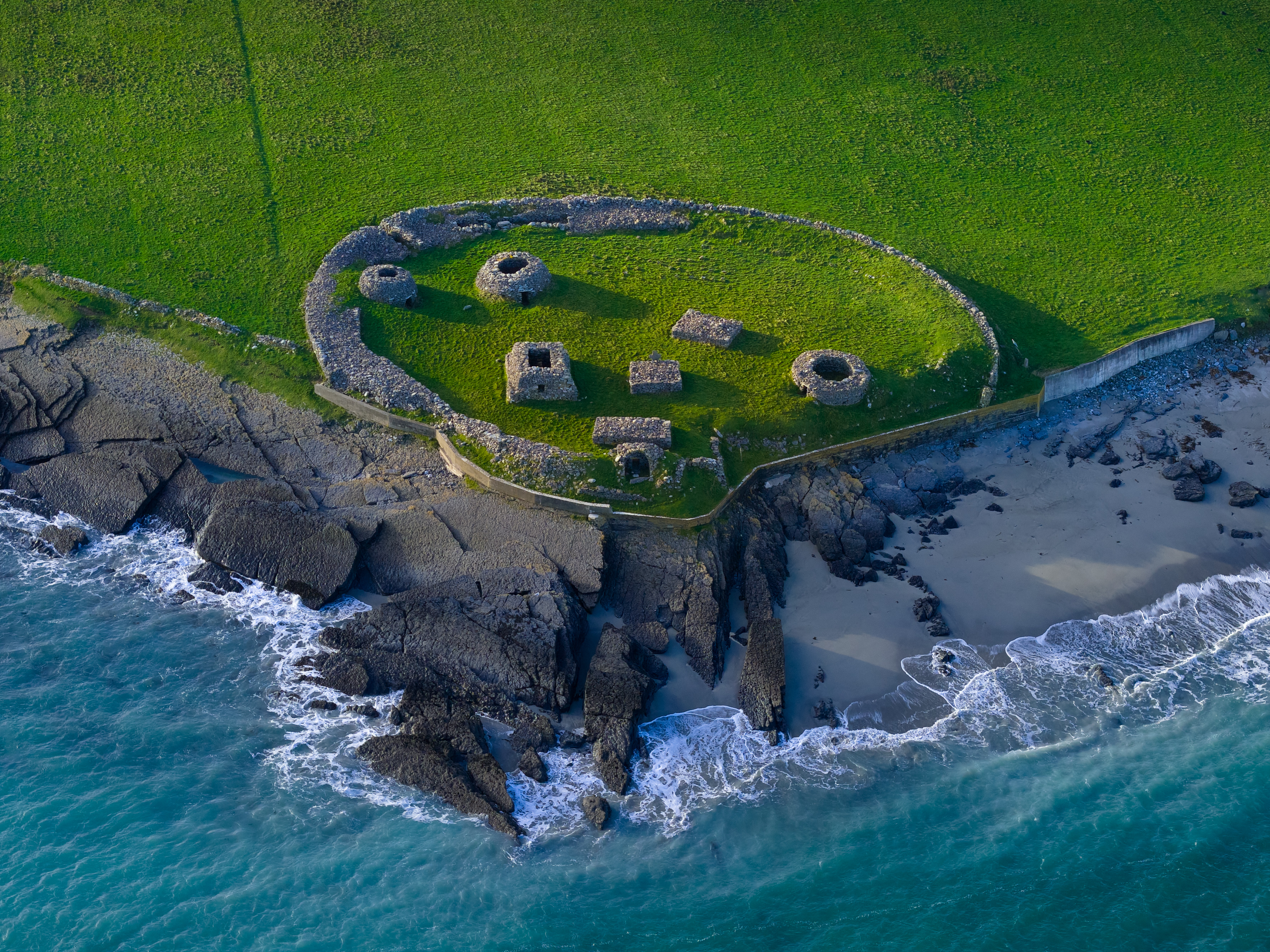
Eastern aerial view

== Site description ==
The Office of Public Works (OPW) classifies it as an Early Christian monastic settlement which comprises two small oratories (including one boat-shaped), three clocháin (beehive huts), a souterrain and wall-chamber, three leachta, a burial ground and a stone cross. The cross stands on the west side of the middle leacht and is 1.82m in height, with bevelled edges and drilled holes indicating that a plaque was formerly affixed to it. There are also three cross slabs currently placed inside the main oratory, ballaun stones, and fragments of five quern-stones located within and outside of the site. Additionally, artefacts such as a bell, dated to 600-900 A.D., and a hammer, were found on the site and are now preserved in the National Museum of Ireland. The site is enclosed by a substantial stone cashel, a circular/oval wall built entirely in drystone construction. Due to the dominance of round shapes of the structures, the site has been quoted as an example of curvilinear ecclesiastical enclosure.

== Site dating ==
There is strong evidence the island had been used long before the monks' activity. The shell midden found inside the enclosure has been dated, using radiocarbon dating, to late Neolithic or early Bronze Age; it is also suggested that the worship place was built upon an appropriated former cashel. The monastic site was founded in 5th, 6th or 7th century depending on the source. Some architectural features in one of the oratories and its altar, bearing resemblance to the "Irish romanesque" style, prove that the site was continued to be used as late as 12th century.

There is evidence pointing to attempts at preserving the site between late 19th and early 20th century.

== See also ==
- Kilshannig Graveyard
