= Lough Gill, County Kerry =

Lake in County Kerry, Ireland

Lough Gill
- Loch Gile (Irish)
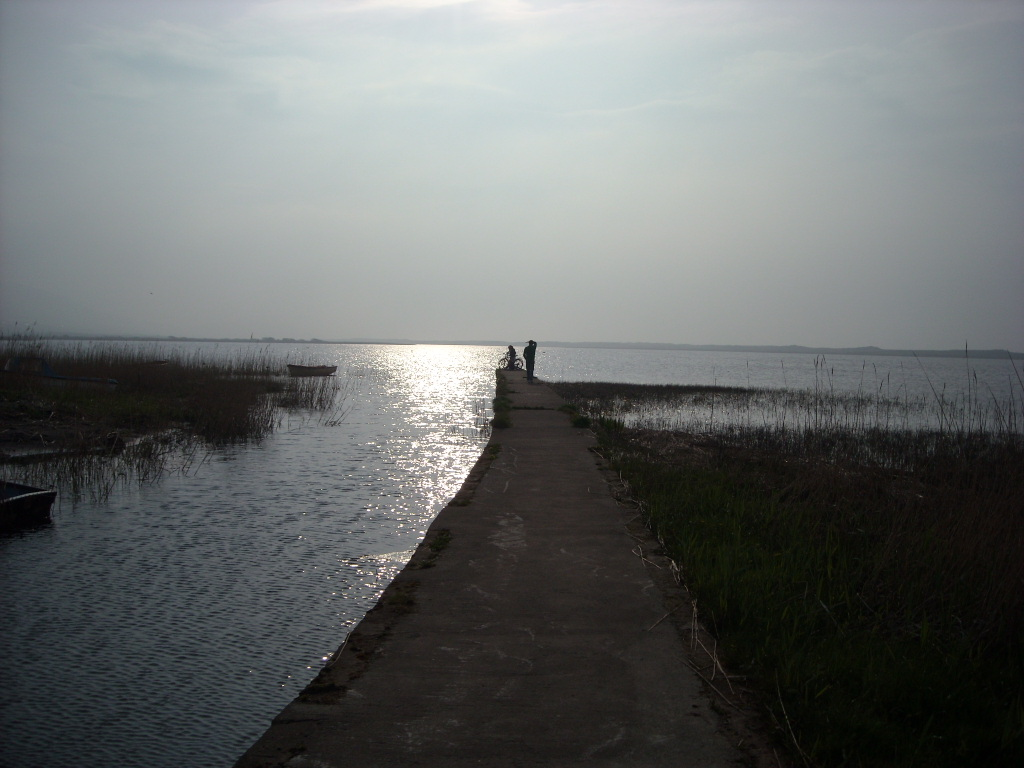

- Location in Ireland
- Location: County Kerry
- Coordinates: 52°15′38″N 10°2′44″W
- Catchment area: 16.43 km^{2} (6.3 sq mi)
- Basin countries: Ireland
- Max. length: 2.2 km (1.4 mi)
- Max. width: 0.9 km (0.6 mi)
- Surface area: 1.4 km^{2} (0.54 sq mi)
- Average depth: 0.5 m (1 ft 7.7 in)
- Surface elevation: 3 m (9.8 ft)

Lough Gill (/lɒk ɡɪl/; Irish: Loch Gile, meaning 'bright lake') is a freshwater lake in the southwest of Ireland. It is located on the Dingle Peninsula in County Kerry.

== Geography ==
Lough Gill measures about 2 km (1.2 mi) long and 1 km (0.6 mi) wide. It is about 30 km (19 mi) west of Tralee, near the village of Castlegregory.

== Hydrology ==
Lough Gill is considered a natural lagoon, draining into Tralee Bay. It is fed by the Killiney River and another unnamed stream. The lake is shallow, with depths of less than 0.5 m (1 ft 8 in).

== Natural history ==
Fish species in Lough Gill include three-spined stickleback, sand goby, brown trout, flounder and the critically endangered European eel. The lake is part of the Tralee Bay and Magharees Peninsula, West to Cloghane Special Area of Conservation.

== See also ==
- List of loughs in Ireland
