= Cloghane =

Village on the Dingle Peninsula, Ireland

An Clochán Cloghane
- Village
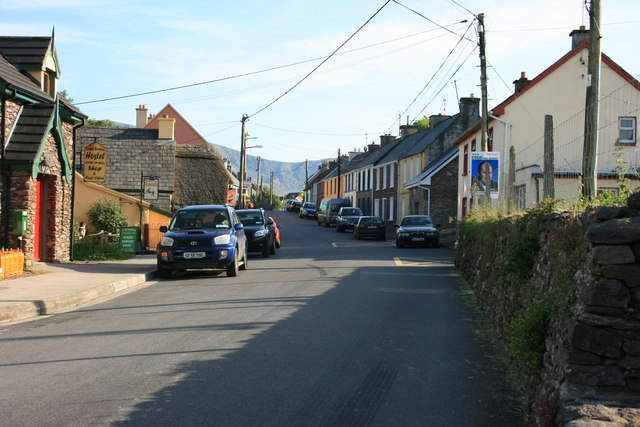

- Location in Ireland
- Coordinates: 52°13′49″N 10°11′45″W
- Country: Ireland
- Province: Munster
- County: County Kerry

Population (2011)
  - Total: 297
- Irish Grid Reference: Q505112
- An Clochán is the only official name.

An Clochán (anglicized as Cloghane; from clochán, a local type of dry-stone hut) is a Gaeltacht village and townland on the Dingle Peninsula of County Kerry, Ireland, at the foot of Mount Brandon. It is also part of a civil parish of the same name. In 1974 the village was added to the Corca Dhuibhne Gaeltacht (Irish-speaking region). It has a population of 297 (2011 Census).

Cloghane and Brandon (An Clochán agus Cé Bhréanainn) are jointly twinned with the village of Plozévet in Brittany (France). The village is set at the foot of Mount Brandon, on the north of the Dingle Peninsula and overlooking Brandon Bay. The village is on the Wild Atlantic Way tourism trail.

An Clochán was the subject of a controversial and influential anthropological study by Nancy Scheper-Hughes in the early 1970s, published as Saints, Scholars and Schizophrenics: Mental Illness in Rural Ireland.

== History ==
According to A Topographical Dictionary of Ireland by Samuel Lewis, the town's population stood at around 222 people in 1837.

== See also ==
- List of towns and villages in Ireland
