= Brandon, County Kerry =

Cé Bhréannain Brandon
- Village
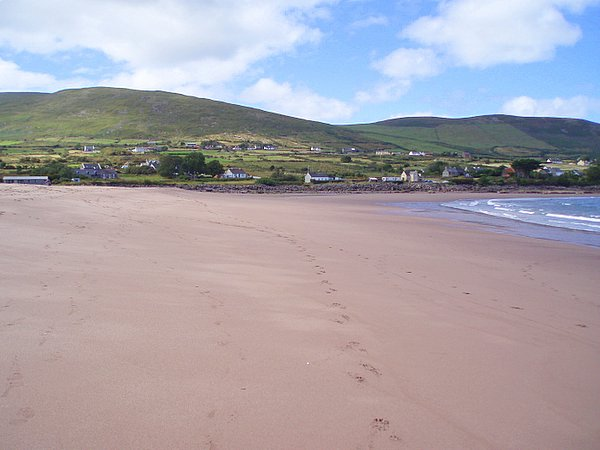

- Location in Ireland
- Coordinates: 52°16′05″N 10°09′41″W
- Country: Ireland
- Province: Munster
- County: County Kerry
- Elevation: 24 m (79 ft)

Population (2002)
  - Urban: 133
- Irish Grid Reference: Q520148
- Cé Bhréannain is the only official name.

Cé Bhréannain or Bréanainn (anglicized as Brandon) is a Gaeltacht village on the northern coast of the Dingle Peninsula in County Kerry, Ireland. It lies directly north of Dingle, at the foot of Mount Brandon and on the shores of Brandon Bay.

The ancient Celtic harvest festival, a pre-Christian celebration called Féile Lughnasa, takes place yearly in the village and surrounding area on the last Sunday of July.

== Windsurfing ==
Brandon Bay is one of the top windsurfing locations in Ireland. Host of three PWA professional wave sailing events in 2000, 2001 and 2002, it is home to several windsurfing schools catering to all levels from beginner to advanced. The Maharees, a sandy peninsula between Brandon Bay and Tralee Bay, is where most windsurfing activity is based. Great locations include Sandy Bay for beginners, Scraggane Bay for intermediates on flat water and Brandon Bay itself for advanced wave sailing. Surfing is also growing quickly in the Maharees, with wave conditions as big as anything in Ireland.

== Twin towns ==
Cloghane and Brandon (An Clochán agus Bhréanainn) are jointly twinned with the village of Plozévet in France.

== See also ==
- List of towns and villages in Ireland
