= Maharees =

Isthmus in County Kerry, Ireland

Maharees An Machaire
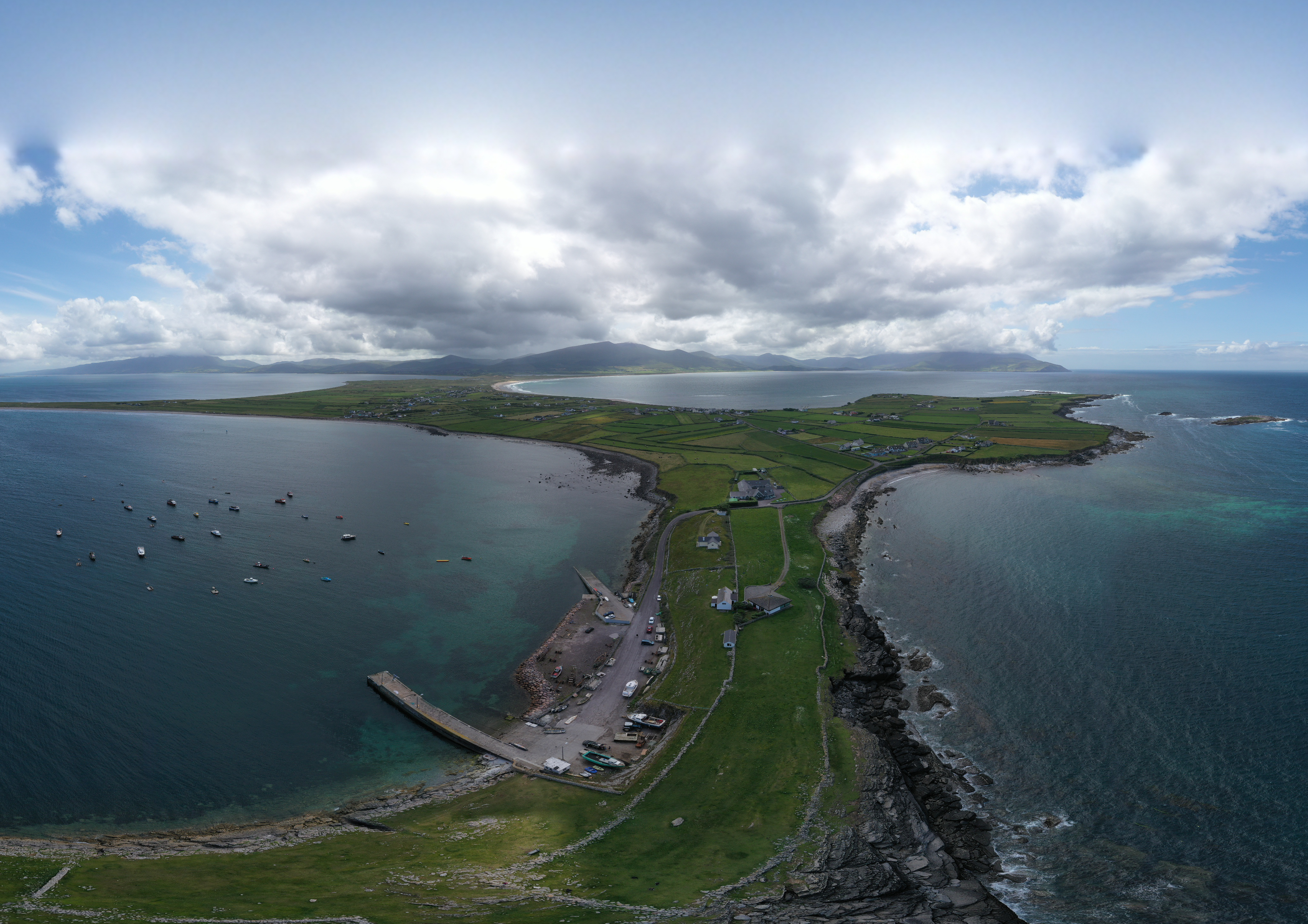
- Aerial (drone) view of the Magharee Peninsula

- Location in Ireland
- Coordinates: 52°15′20″N 10°01′16″W
- Country: Ireland
- Province: Munster
- County: County Kerry
- Time zone: UTC+0 (WET)
  - Summer (DST): UTC-1 (IST (WEST))
- Irish Grid Reference: Q617134

Maharees or Magharees (Irish: An Machaire or Na Machairí) is a 5 km long tombolo located on the northern side of the Dingle Peninsula in County Kerry, Ireland.

Fenit Harbour, the main port of County Kerry, is sheltered from large Atlantic swells by the Maharees. To the north of the Maharees lie the Magharee Islands or Seven Hogs, the largest of which, Oileán t-Seanaigh/Illauntannig, contains remnants of an early Christian monastic settlement, said to have been founded by St. Senan in the 7th century AD.

The peninsula is a sandy spit for much of its length, with sand dunes giving way to earth and rocky ground towards the northern end. The sand dunes create a unique ecosystem, home to the rare Natterjack toad which is found locally in significant quantities. Lengthy beaches are found on both sides of the peninsula, which separates Brandon Bay on the western side from Tralee Bay to the east. The Brandon Bay beaches are open to the North Atlantic and often receive long swells, suitable for surfing given wind and tide conditions.

The peninsula has a number of campgrounds and caravan parks and contains three hamlets, Fahamore, Kilshannig, and Candeehy. Castlegregory Golf and Fishing club is a nine-hole links golf course located at the base of the peninsula, and a PADI certified dive centre is located at the fishing harbour at Scraggane Bay. Several windsurfing and surf schools are also located at the beaches on the Maharees. Maheree Island Tours and Angling is based at Scraggane Pier. Yachting facilities, a marina, and a sheltered harbour are located a few miles east at Fenit.
