= Magharee Islands =

Group of 7 islands in County Kerry, Island

Coordinates: 52°19′N 10°02′W

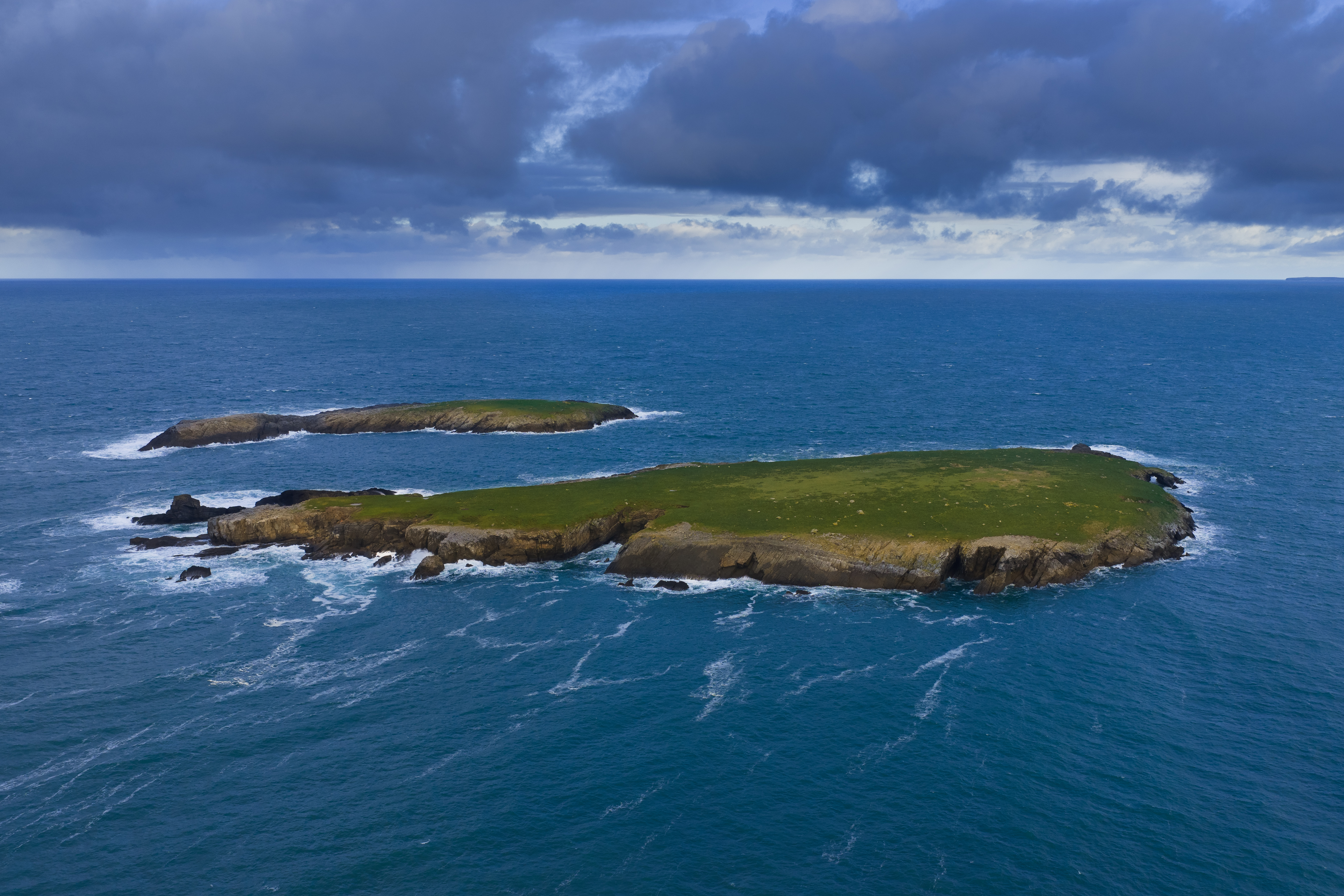
- Illaunimmil and Inishtooskert, two of the Magharee Islands
- Interactive map of Magharee Islands

Geography
- Location: Atlantic Ocean
- Total islands: 7

Administration
- Ireland
- County: Kerry

Demographics
- Population: 0

The Magharee Islands (Irish: Na Machairí), also known as "The Seven Hogs", are a group of uninhabited islands located off Rough Point at the northern tip of the Magharee Peninsula in County Kerry, Ireland. The islands, which are part of the parish of Castlegregory, are well known as excellent diving and snorkelling destinations. The Magharees Sound separates the Seven Hogs from the mainland. Scraggane Pier is the nearest landing point on the mainland.

The Magharees were an important area of early monastic activity in Ireland, and the Illauntannig Monastic Site is designated as a National Monument with restricted access.

== Important Bird Area ==
The islands have been designated an Important Bird Area (IBA) by BirdLife International because they support breeding populations of several species of seabirds.

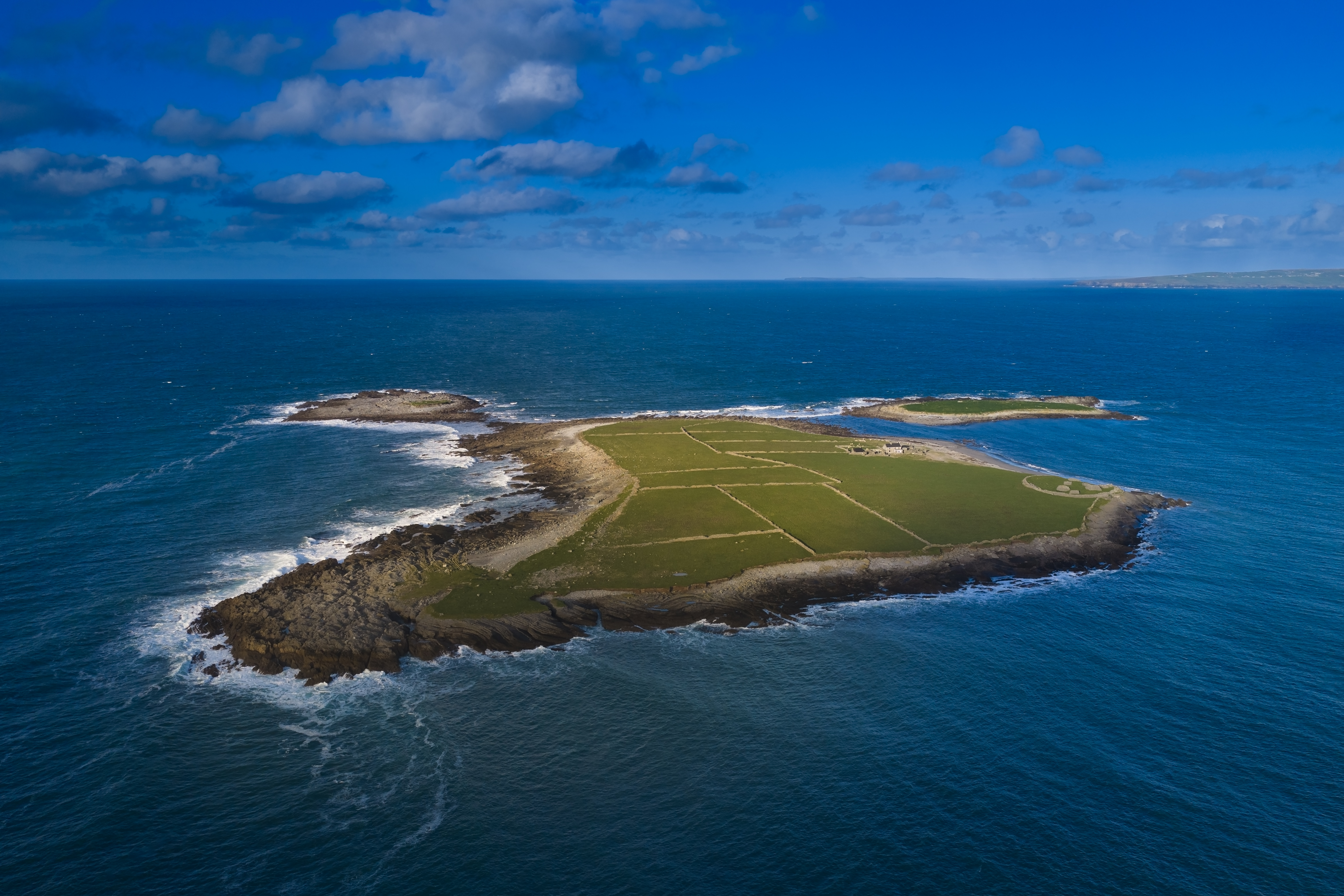
Illauntannig

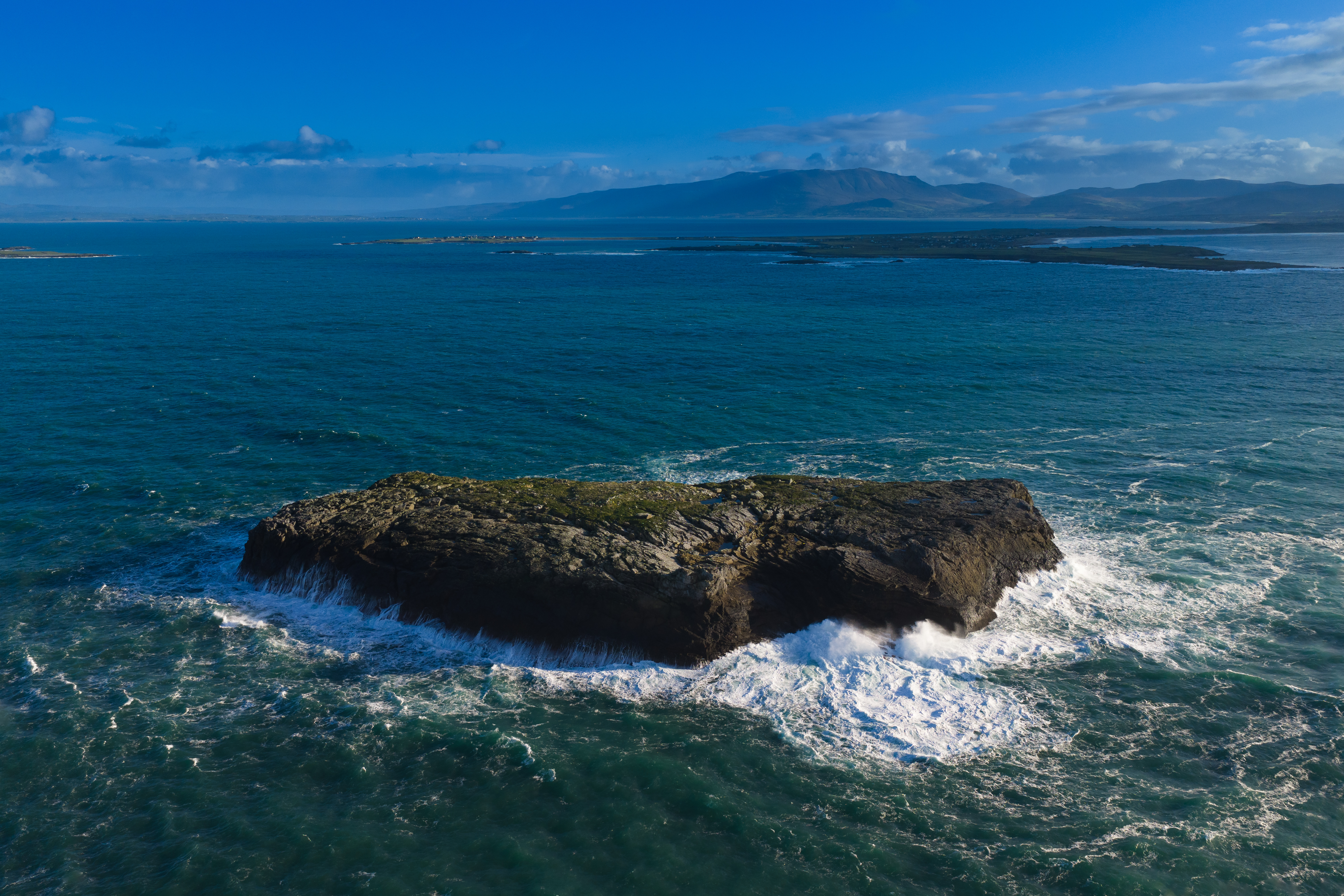
Gurrig Island, with Magharees tombolo visible in the distance, and Slieve Mish Mountains even further

== Islands ==
- Gurrig Island – Gorach
- Illaunboe – Oileán Bó
- Illaunimmil – Oileán Imill
- Illauntannig – Oileán tSeanaigh (this is the largest of the islands)
- Illaunturlogh – Oileán Traolaigh
- Inishtooskert – Inis Tuaisceart
- Mucklaghbeg Island – An Mhuclach Bheag

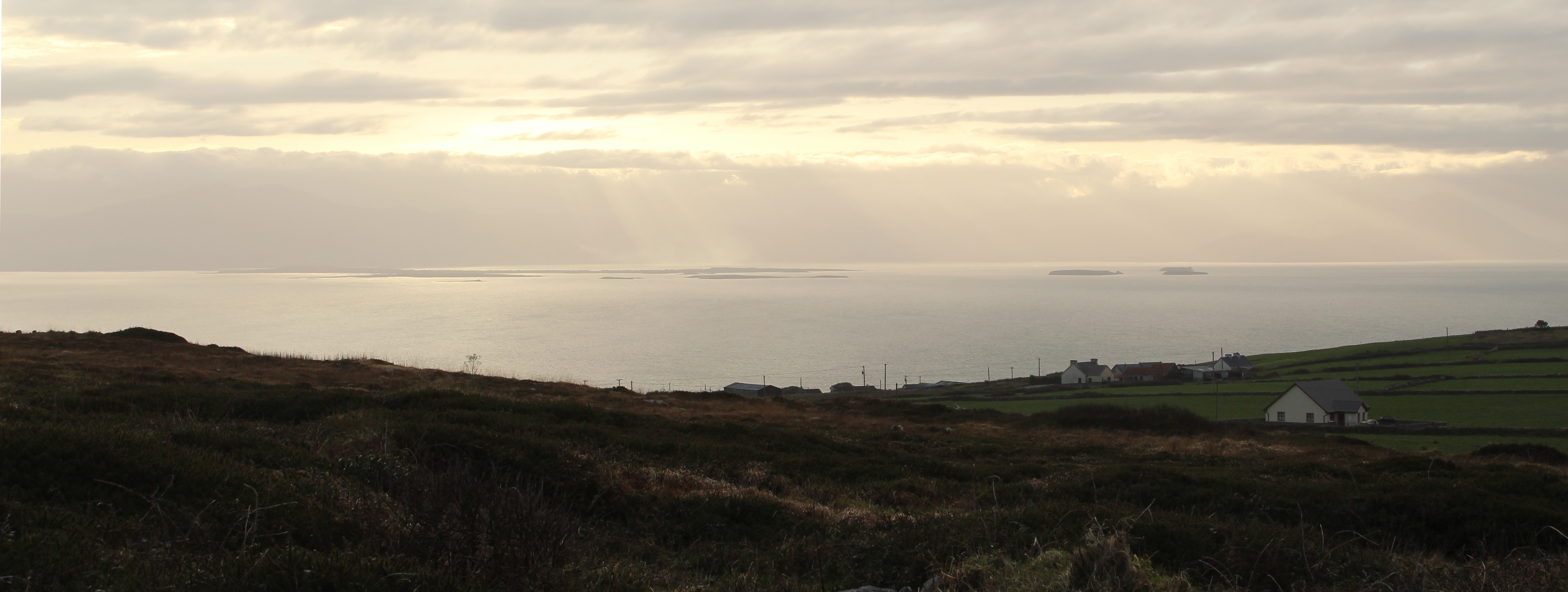
Magharee islands as seen from Kerry head

== Usage ==
The islands were inhabited until the early 1980s but now serve only as summer grazing for the livestock of several local farmers. Up until recently, many farmers would swim their cattle and sheep across to the islands at low tide, rowing alongside them inside Currachs or other small boats. If an animal got into difficulty it was hauled aboard or tied to a boat, or simply left to drown. Nowadays, a modified cage with several flotation devices attached to it, is pulled behind a boat and the crossing is much less taxing on the animals and their owners. A farmhouse on Illauntannig (the only dwelling on the island) can be rented out on a weekly basis April - September.

== Illauntannig ==
Historical population

Year	Pop.	±%
1841	0	—
1851	0	0.00%
1861	16	—
1871	19	+18.8%
1881	17	−10.5%
1891	22	+29.4%
1901	16	−27.3%
1911	10	−37.5%

Year	Pop.	±%
1926	15	+50.0%
1936	7	−53.3%
1946	2	−71.4%
1951	4	+100.0%
1956	0	−100.0%
1961	0	0.00%
1966	0	0.00%
1971	0	0.00%

Year	Pop.	±%
1979	0	0.00%
1981	0	0.00%
1986	0	0.00%
1991	0	0.00%
1996	0	0.00%
2002	0	0.00%
2006	0	0.00%

Source: Central Statistics Office. "CNA17: Population by Off Shore Island, Sex and Year". CSO.ie.
