= Leacht =

Small stone structure in early Christian Ireland

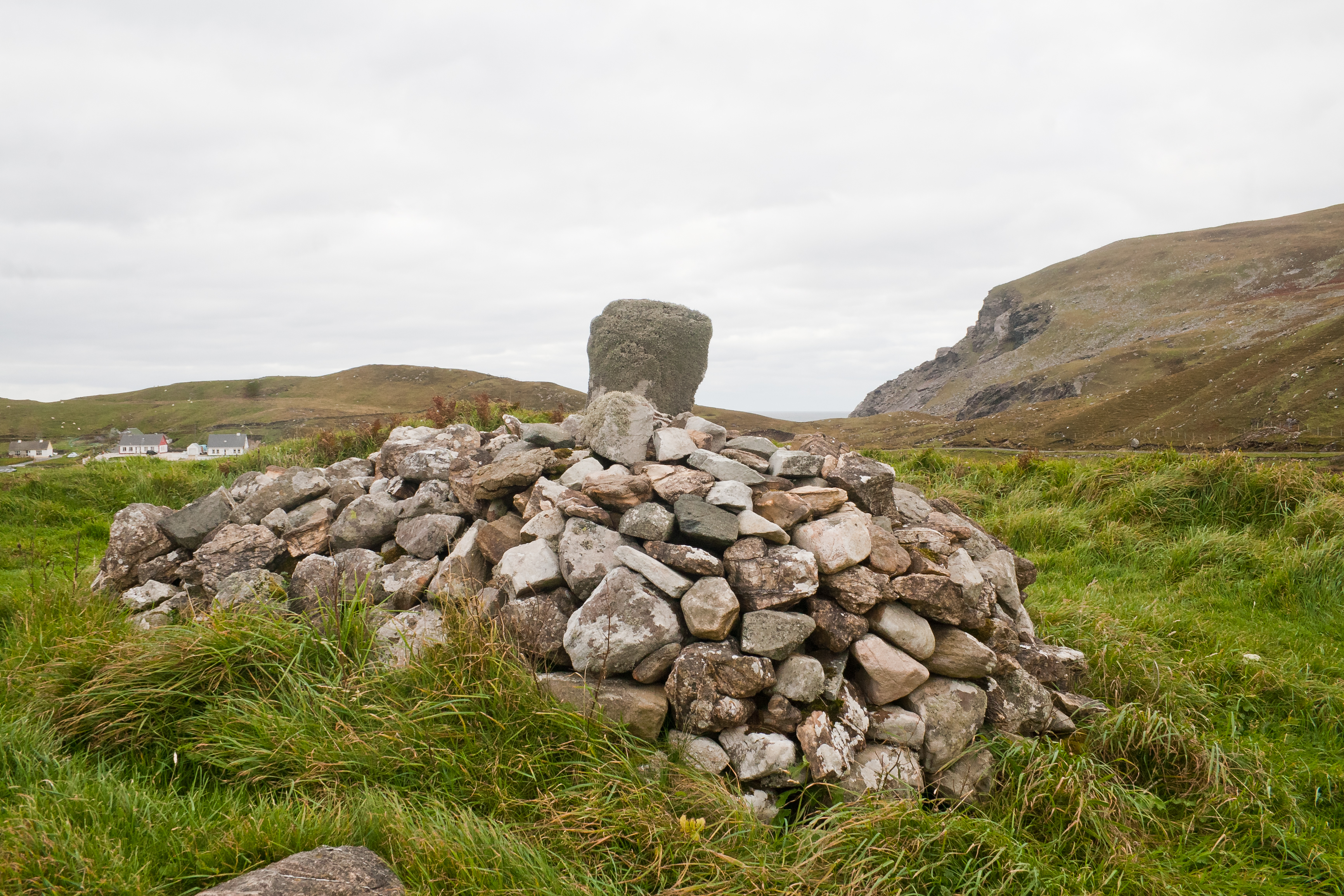
Leacht at Glencolmcille, County Donegal, Ireland

A leacht (plural: leachta) is a small square or rectangular stone structure often found in Early Irish Christian places of worship. They are typically made from rough, unmortared stones, and are most often found in monasteries on islands off the west coast of Ireland. Their precise function is unknown; they may have been erected to mark burial places (a number contain human remains), or to honor a saint, or for use as an altar or place of prayer.

Because they are so perishable and easily destroyed, their original density and distribution is unknown. The best known examples are found on the islands of Skellig Michael and Illauntannig, both off County Kerry, and Inishmurray off County Sligo.
