= Beenoskee =

Mountain in County Kerry, Ireland

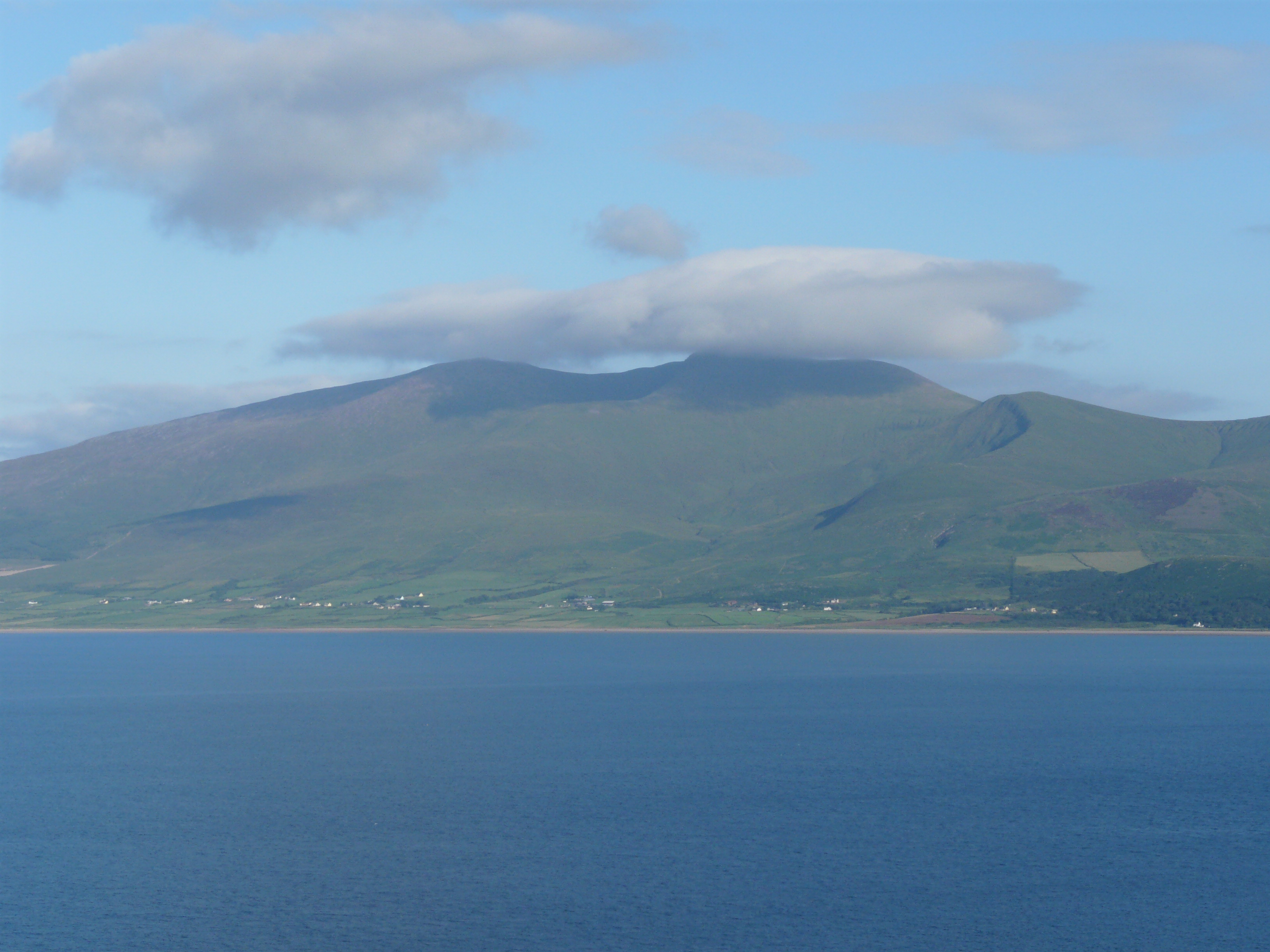

Highest point
- Elevation: 826 m (2,710 ft)
- Prominence: 491 m (1,611 ft)
- Listing: Hewitt, Marilyn
- Coordinates: 52°12′50″N 10°04′39″W

Naming
- Native name: Binn os Gaoith
- English translation: peak above the wind/estuary

Geography
- Location within island of Ireland
- Location: Dingle Peninsula, County Kerry, Ireland
- Parent range: Mountains of the Central Dingle Peninsula
- OSI/OSNI grid: Q580088

Beenoskee or Benoskee (Irish: Binn os Gaoith) is a mountain on the Dingle Peninsula in County Kerry, Ireland. It rises to 826 m (2,710 ft) and is the highest of the 'Central Dingle' Mountains.

== Geography ==
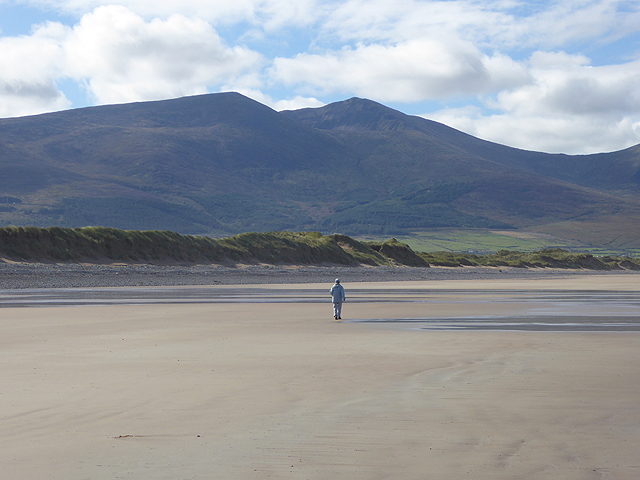
Beenoskee from Stradbally Strand

Beenoskee is part of the Dingle Mountains, and is the highest of the "Central Dingle" group and the 28th highest in Ireland. The mountain overlooks Brandon Bay, to its north. It is in the Gaeltacht.

Beenoskee's neighbouring peak is known as Stradbally Mountain, which is slightly lower at 798 m (2,618 ft). Between the two peaks is a small lake called Lough Acummeen (Loch an Choimín), which sits at a height of 816 m (2,677 ft).

== Name ==
Beenoskee is an anglicised spelling; the mountain is called Binn os Gaoith in Irish. Researcher Paul Tempan writes: "this name is locally understood to mean 'mountain above the wind', but as wind speeds tend only to increase the more height one gains, one has to ask what this could possibly mean". He suggests that it could have originally meant 'mountain above the estuary'; gaoth historically had this meaning, and is found in a few placenames such as Gaoth Dobhair.

In 1841, the Ordnance Survey recorded the mountain's name as Beniskehaun and Beann na Scaoith, while variants such as Beann na Scaioth, Binn o Scaoith, and other, also existed.

== Plane crash ==
On 19 December 1944 (or 20 December depending on the source), at 3 am, a RAF airplane crashed into Beenoskee, killing all 9 members of the crew.

== See also ==
- Lists of mountains in Ireland
- List of mountains of the British Isles by height
- List of Marilyns in the British Isles
- List of Hewitt mountains in England, Wales and Ireland
