= Scraggane =

Fishing port in County Kerry, Ireland

Coordinates: 52°18′37″N 10°2′5″W

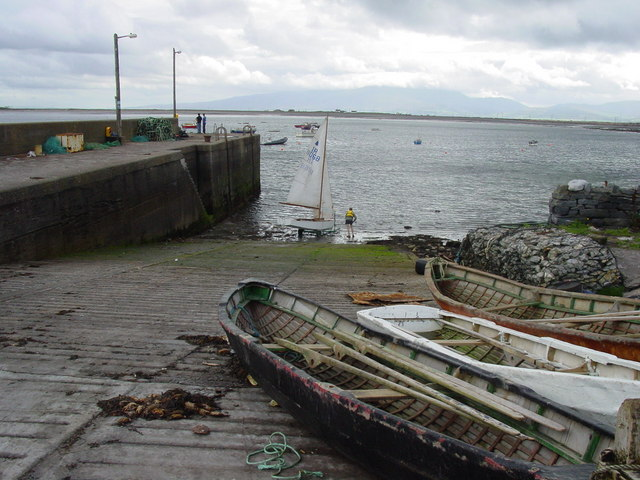
Scraggane pier

Scraggane (Irish: An Scragán) is a fishing port located on the Maharees peninsula near Castlegregory in County Kerry, Ireland.

The main local catch consists of lobster, flat-back crab, spider crab, Atlantic crayfish, Atlantic salmon and mackerel. Scraggane is home to a fleet of about twenty fishing trawlers.

Scraggane Bay is used as a flatwater windsurfing venue owing, and is also sailable in almost any conditions, regardless of wind direction.

== See also ==
- List of towns and villages in Ireland
