= Mountains of the Central Dingle Peninsula =

Mountain range in County Kerry, Ireland

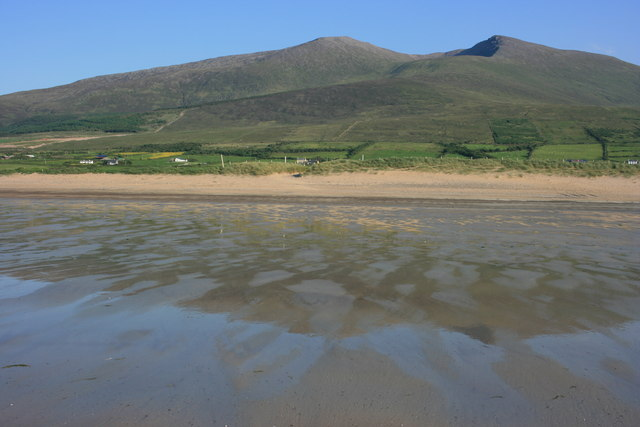
- Beenoskee and Stradbally Mountain from Gowlane Strand

Highest point
- Peak: Beenoskee
- Elevation: 826 m (2,710 ft)
- Prominence: 491 m (1,611 ft)
- Coordinates: 52°12′50″N 10°04′39″W

Dimensions
- Length: 20 km (12 mi) E/W
- Width: 11 km (6.8 mi) N/S

Geography
- Location within island of Ireland
- Location: County Kerry
- Country: Ireland
- Provinces of Ireland: Munster
- Topo map: OSI Discovery 71/70

Geology
- Rock age: Devonian
- Rock type: Purple cross-bedded sandstone

The Mountains of the Central Dingle Peninsula are the generic name given to the mountains that lie on the Dingle Peninsula between the Brandon Group of mountains in the west, and the Slieve Mish Mountains at the eastern end of the peninsula.

== Geology ==
Like many of the mountain ranges in County Kerry, such as the MacGillycuddy Reeks, the mountains of the Central Dingle peninsula are composed predominantly of Devonian period Old Red Sandstone, with a band of Ordovician period metasediments.

The rocks date from the Upper Devonian period (310–450 million years ago) when Ireland was in a hot equatorial setting. During this 60 million year period, Ireland was the site of a major basin, known as the Munster basin, and Cork and Kerry were effectively a large alluvial floodplain. Chemical oxidation stained the material with a purple–reddish colour (and green in places from chlorination), still visible today. There are virtually no fossils in Old Red Sandstone.

The composition of Old Red Sandstone is variable and includes sandstones, mudstones, siltstones, and conglomerates (boulders containing quartz pebbles are visible throughout the range). The mountains were subject to significant glaciation with corries and U-shaped valleys, however the range does not have the sharp rocky arêtes and ridges of the MacGillycuddy Reeks range.

== List of peaks ==
The following is a download from the MountainViews Online Database, who list 23 identifiable Central Dingle peaks with an elevation, or height, above 100 metres

Marilyn: Any height, and prominence over 150 metres (492 ft).

Peaks of the Central Dingle Mountain range (MountainViews Online Database, July 2019)
Height Rank	Prom. Rank	Name	Irish Name (if different)	Translation	Height (m)	Prom. (m)	Height (ft)	Prom. (ft)	Topo Map	OSI Grid Reference
1	1	Beenoskee	Binn os Gaoith	Mountain above the Wind/Estuary (Note: This name is locally understood to mean 'mountain above the wind', but as wind speeds tend only to increase the more height one gains, one has to ask what this could possibly mean. Another possibility is that gaoth is rather an archaic word for a water feature (possibly Lough Gill or the estuary of the nearby Owenmore River), and that the name was no longer understood once this word had fallen out of common use.)	826	491	2,710	1,611	70	Q580089
2	20	Stradbally Mountain	Cnoc an tSráidbhaile	Hill of Stradbally	798	40	2,618	131	70	Q587092
3	2	Slievanea NE Top	—	—	671	265	2,200	869	70	Q515064
4	12	An Cnapán Mór	—	The Big Lump (Note: An Seabhac also gives the alternative name An Sliabh Dubh ("the black mountain"). Previously Gowlane Beg.)	649	81	2,129	266	70	Q522045
5	6	Cnoc na Bánóige (Note: Also known as Banoge North.)	—	Hill of the Grassy Patch	642	176	2,105	577	70	Q548048
6	21	Slievanea	Sliabh Macha Ré	Mountain of the Smooth Plain (Note: The anglicised form Slievanea would appear to derive from Ir. Sliabh an Fhia, 'mountain of the deer'. The deer is also an important symbol in Celtic mythology. In many tales they lure people into the realm of the gods. Remains of several fulachta fia (venison-cooking pits) can be found around Lough Adoon.)	629	22	2,063	73	70	Q508057
7	19	Coombane (Note: Marked as 'Coombane' on the 6 map. The name refers originally to a hollow in the upper reaches of Kilcummin Beg townland.)	An Com Bán	The White Hollow	610	42	2,001	138	70	Q568092
8	23	Croaghskearda	Cruach Sceirde	Stack of the Exposed Place (Note: Near a path over the brow of the hill between Gowlin and Lisdargan there is an underground passage called Staighre Chaitlín (Cathleen's Stairs) which leads to a cave.)	608	13	1,995	43	70	Q509039
9	18	Knockmulanane	Cnoc Mhaoilionáin	Mulfinan's hill	593	48	1,946	157	70	Q568049
10	15	Beenatoor	Binn an Tuair	Peak of the Bleaching Green	592	66	1,942	217	70	Q559089
11	22	Knockmulanane West Top	—	—	563	15	1,847	49	70	Q560048
12	5	Dromavally Mountain	Cnoc Dhroim an Bhaile	Hill of Dromavally (Note: Three cairns on the summit ridge of Dromavally Mountain are named Cú Chulainn's House, Cú Chulainn's Bed and Cú Chulainn's Grave.)	552	206	1,811	676	71	Q606067
13	9	Sliabh na nGabhar (Note: The Irish form is given as Slí na gCorr on the OS Discovery map. However, this is clearly not the name of a mountain. It either refers to a track or is perhaps a corruption of Sliabh na nGabhar.)	—	Mountain of the Goats	486	120	1,594	394	70	Q539072
14	7	Cummeen (Note: An Seabhac also mentions a peak called An Bhinn Bháin above Lough Acummeen, but this may refer to a cliff rather than the summit.)	Sliabh an Choimín	Mountain of the Little Hollow	477	162	1,565	531	71	Q630077
15	17	Gob an Iolair (Note: Since Beenbo is clearly a separate name (probably from Ir. Binn Bó, 'peak of the cow'), it seems likely that it is the true name of the summit, while Gob an Iolair applies originally to the sharp point just N of the summit.)	—	Beak of the eagle	477	48	1,564	158	70	Q545074
16	14	An Starraicín	—	The Steeple (Note: This peak earns its name with its pointed peak.)	458	71	1,504	233	70	Q528064
17	16	Cnoc na Bánóige N Top	—		448	52	1,469	170	70	Q552061
18	13	Knocknakilton	(unknown) (Note: This name is not mentioned by An Seabhac in TCCD. It is unclear what the second element is.)	(unknown)	423	79	1,388	259	71	Q638062
19	4	Brickany (Note: This hill, located in the townland of Ballynane, is unnamed on OS Discovery map but named on the old ½ series and on road atlases. Has been called Tullig.)	Breicneach	Speckled Place	374	219	1,227	719	71	Q632022
20	3	Knocknanacree	Cnoc na nAcraí	hill of na hAcraí/Acres (Note: Acres (na hAcraí) is a townland name.)	286	260	938	853	70	V572998
21	8	Cnoc an Ghleanna	—	Hill of the Glen	252	136	827	446	70	V502987
22	11	Carrigadav	Carraig an Daimh	The Rock of the Bull	240	96	787	315	71	Q626097
23	10	Farrandalouge	Fearann Dealúigh	The Land of the Two Hollows	144	97	472	318	70	Q546115

== See also ==
- Brandon Group, a mountain range in Dingle Peninsula
- Slieve Mish Mountains, a mountain range in Dingle Peninsula
- Lists of mountains in Ireland
- List of mountains of the British Isles by height
- List of P600 mountains in the British Isles
- List of Marilyns in the British Isles
- List of Hewitt mountains in England, Wales and Ireland
