= Mount Brandon =

Mountain in Kerry, Ireland

Mount Brandon (and the Brandon Group)
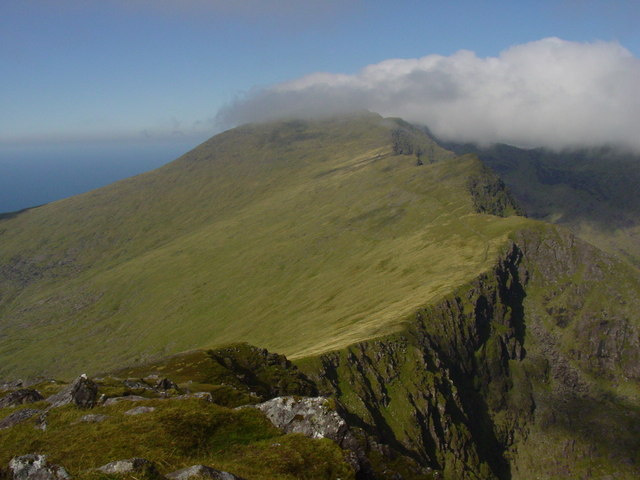
- Mount Brandon photographed from Brandon Peak, with its distinctive east–west contrast.

Highest point
- Elevation: 951.7 m (3,122 ft)
- Prominence: 934 m (3,064 ft)
- Parent peak: Carrauntoohil
- Isolation: 26.7 miles (43.0 km)
- Listing: P600, Marilyn, Furth, Hewitt, Arderin, Simm, Vandeleur-Lynam
- Coordinates: 52°14′06″N 10°15′16″W

Naming
- Native name: Cnoc Bréanainn
- English translation: Brendan's hill

Geography
- Location within island of Ireland
- Location: Dingle Peninsula, County Kerry, Ireland
- Parent range: Brandon Group
- OSI/OSNI grid: Q4604211605
- Topo map: OSI Discovery 70

Geology
- Rock age: Devonian
- Mountain type(s): Purple sandstone & siltstone

Climbing
- Easiest route: Saint's Route (Cosán na Naomh)

Mount Brandon or Brandon (Irish: Cnoc Bréanainn, meaning 'Brendan's hill'), at 952 metres (3,123 ft), is one of the ten highest peaks in Ireland, being the 8th–highest peak in Ireland on the Arderin list, and the 9th–highest on the Vandeleur-Lynam list. Brandon is the highest Irish mountain outside the MacGillycuddy's Reeks range and has the greatest prominence of any Irish peak except Carrauntoohil, Ireland's highest mountain.

Mount Brandon is at the centre of a long high ridge called the Brandon Group range of mountains in the Dingle Peninsula in County Kerry. The ridge contains seven other major peaks (i.e. above 2,000 ft in height); one is the similarly named Brandon Peak (840 metres). The positioning and dimensions of the Brandon Group ridge have made it the scene of several air accidents over the years. The mountain, and range, is named after Saint Brendan, and is the end of a Christian pilgrimage trail known as Cosán na Naomh. It is also well regarded for hill walking with routes such as the 4–5-hour Faha Route (also called The Pilgrim's Path), and the 6–7-hour traverse of the entire range known as "one of the finest ridgewalks in Ireland".

== Geology ==
Brandon is composed of sandstone particles of various sizes collectively known as Old Red Sandstone. Old Red Sandstone has a purple–reddish colour, and has virtually no fossils. The colour gave its name to nearby Purple Mountain. The composition of Old Red Sandstone is variable and contains quartz stones, mudstones, siltstones, and sandstone particles (conglomerate rock boulders with quartz pebbles are visible). They are described by the Geological Survey of Ireland as the oldest Devonian rocks in Ireland.

== Geography ==
Mount Brandon itself is in the middle of a long and high ridge known as the Brandon Group, which runs north–south for 10 kilometres (6.2 mi) across the width of the Dingle peninsula. As well as Mount Brandon, the Brandon Group ridge has seven other major classified peaks (see list below), including the similarly named Brandon Peak 840 metres (2,760 ft), Benagh 822 metres (2,697 ft), Faha Ridge 809 metres (2,654 ft), Gearhane 803 metres (2,635 ft), Masatiompan 762 metres (2,500 ft), Piaras Mór 746 metres (2,448 ft), and An Scraig 623 metres (2,044 ft).

The most distinctive aspect of the Brandon Group is the contrast between the gentle grassy slopes on its western side, and the sharp cliffs and deep corries of its eastern side; an effect that the Brandon Group's long north–south ridge exactly separates. Mount Brandon owes its craggy shape to the work of glaciers during the ice age, which gouged out a series of corries on the eastern flank of the mountain. The summit of Mount Brandon is rounded and smooth as it was likely a nunatuk (like Lugnaquilla in Wicklow), and presents a stark contrast to Brandon Peak, or Barr an Ghéaráin, which is alpine in appearance.

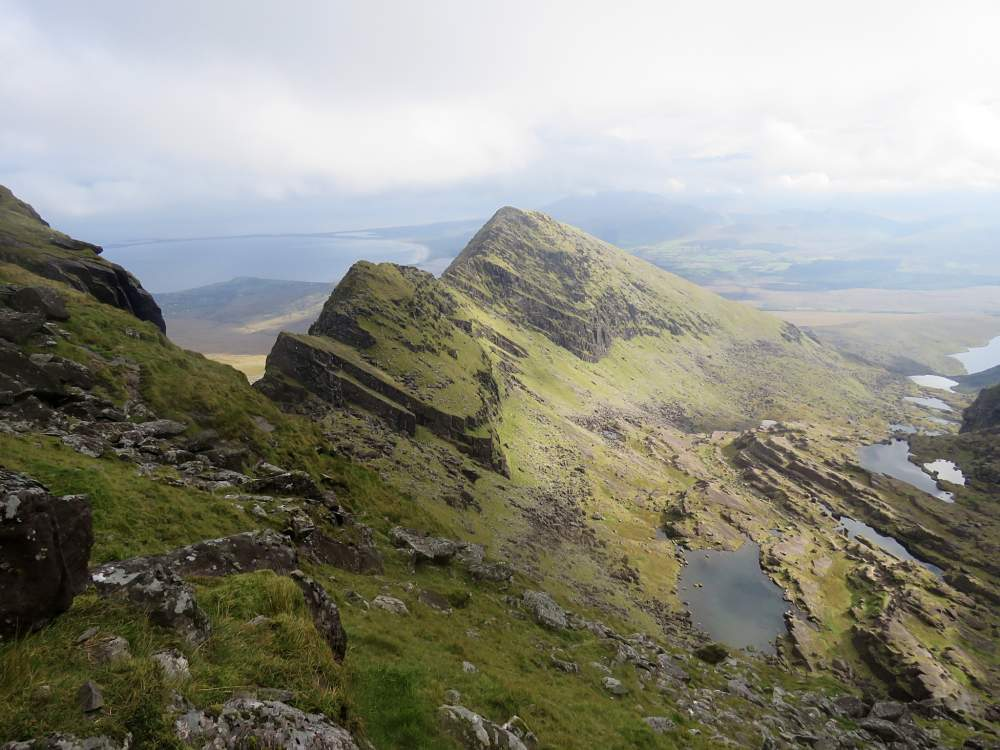
The chain of paternoster lakes from Brandon's east corrie; Faha Ridge is middle left, and Benagh back left

On Brandon's deep eastern corrie, flanked by Faha Ridge to its north, is a series of rocky plateaus, each of which has a small paternoster lake; over ten lakes grow in size descending the mountain. From highest they are, the Locha Chom an Chnoic (Coumaknock Loughs), Loch na Lice (Lough Nalacken) and Loch Cruite (Lough Cruttia). This corrie's natural environment, and positioning on the Faha Route, means it is regularly photographed.

Brandon is the 340th–highest mountain, and 10th most prominent mountain, in Britain and Ireland, on the Simms classification. Brandon is regarded by the Scottish Mountaineering Club ("SMC") as one of 34 Furths, which is a mountain above 3,000 ft (914 m) in elevation, and meets the other SMC criteria for a Munro (e.g. "sufficient separation"), but which is outside of (or furth) Scotland; Brandon is referred to as one of the 13 Irish Munros.

Brandon's prominence qualifies for the P600 classification. Both Brandon and Brandon Peak, meet the Britain and Ireland Marilyn classification. Brandon is the 3rd highest mountain, and Brandon Peak is the 9th highest mountain, in the MountainViews Online Database, 100 Highest Irish Mountains.

== Naming ==
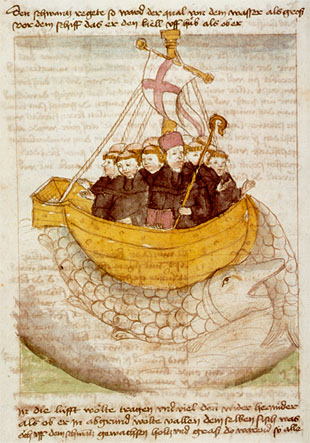
Voyage of St. Brendan.

The mountain is called Brandon Mountain, Mount Brandon and Brandon on various maps.

Brandon takes its name from Saint Brendan the Navigator, or Bréanainn, who is said to have been born in what is now County Kerry in 484 AD, and is chiefly known for his legendary voyage in a boat of wood and leather to discover the "Isle of the Blessed", also called Saint Brendan's Island. In the story of Brendan's life (titled, the Beatha Bhréanainn, or the Latin version, the Vita Brendani), he spent three days fasting on the mountain before his voyage, was visited by an angel, and experienced a vision of "a great land to the west"; the mountain is described as being surrounded by the ocean, which fits with the topography of Mount Brandon.

Irish academic Paul Tempan wrote in his 2010 Irish Hill and Mountain Names, that it is likely that the mountain was a source of pilgrimage even before both St. Brendan and the arrival of Christianity altogether. Its importance may be due to the fact that, being so far west and so high, it is the place where the sun can be seen the latest as it sinks below the horizon. Tempan notes that the medieval story about Brendan's life calls the mountain Sliabh nDaidche in the Irish version, or Mons Aitche in the Latin version; and that the Irish academic Dr Alan Mac an Bhaird, had translated this as "mountain of Faithche", as Brandon stands in the Faha townland. However, some believe that the Mons Aitche name refers to Slieve Aughty, rather than to Mount Brandon.

Some sources link the name with the voyages of Bran mac Febail, however, this is considered less likely.

== Hill walking ==
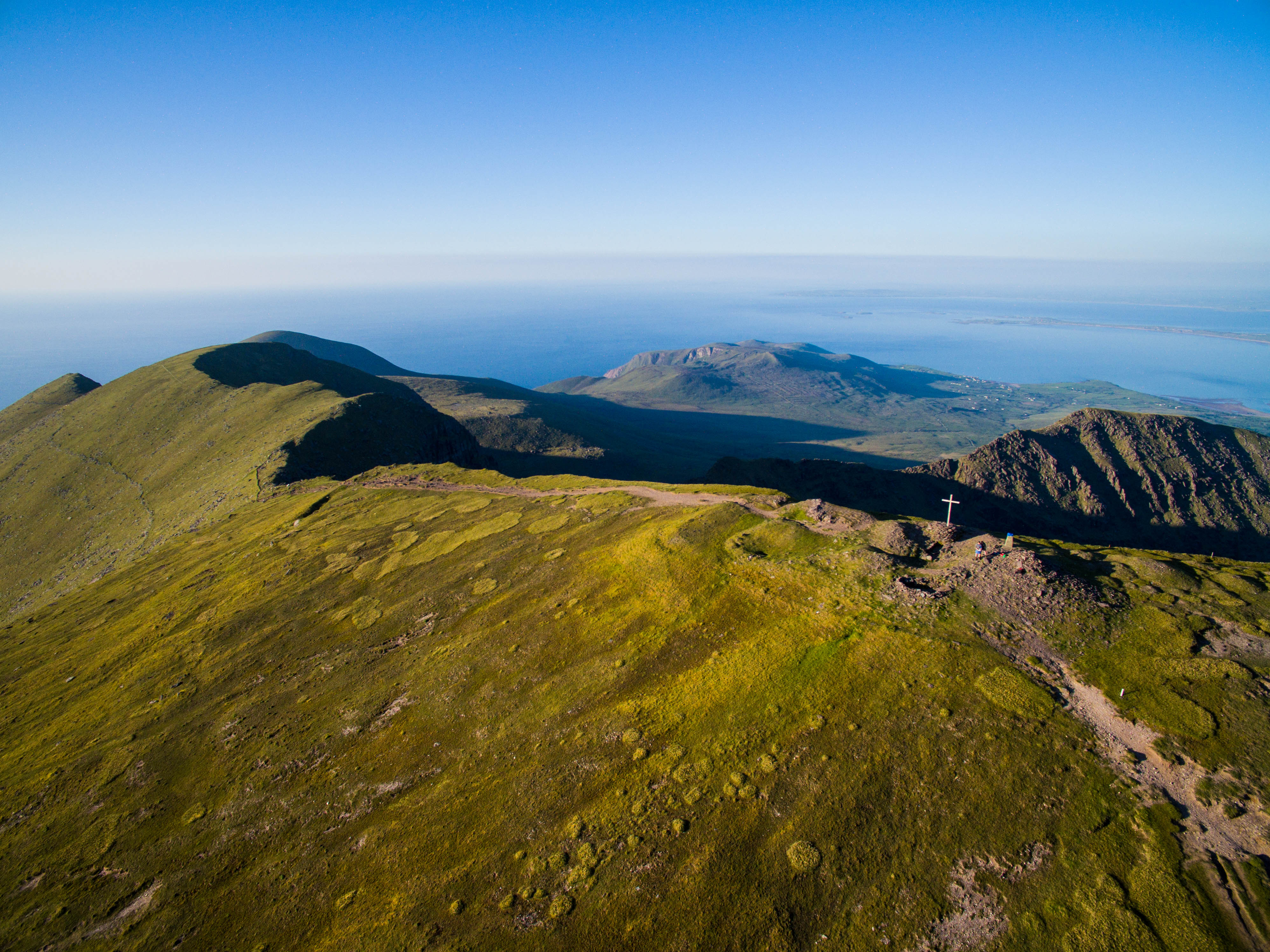
The summit of Brandon seen from The Saint's Route in the west.

The quickest and easiest route to the summit of Mount Brandon is from the west via the final stages of the medieval pilgrim path, The Saint's Route (Irish: Cosán na Naomh), which begins 18 kilometres (11 mi) away in Ventry. The route starts from the car park of Ballybrack (Irish: Baile Breac) (W434094), and follows the straight grassy path, marked by large crosses, to the summit of Mount Brandon; then retracing back to Ballybrack. The 8-kilometre (5.0 mi) route takes 3–4 hours. A longer 5-hour variation is to continue north along the summit ridge from Mount Brandon to Piaras Mor, and then descend to Ballyknockane.

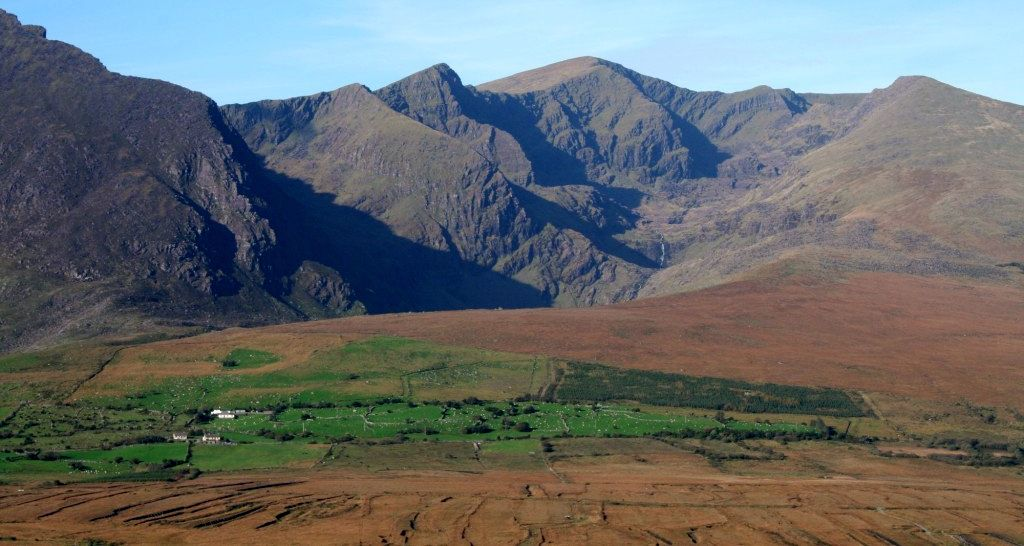
East face of Mount Brandon seen from the Faha Route, at Cloghane.

A scenic variation is the 9-kilometre (5.6 mi) 4–5-hour Faha Route, the Pilgrim's Path, (Note: This is sometimes confused with the Cosán na Naomh on the west side, which can also be called the Pilgrim's Path, hence the use of Faha Route to properly distinguish it) which starts from the east via the car park at the Faha Grotto (Q493119) just outside Cloghane. The route to the summit is marked, and offers views of the deep corries and paternoster lakes on Brandon's glaciated east face. It follows a trail below the Faha Ridge to the summit; then retracing back to Faha Grotto.

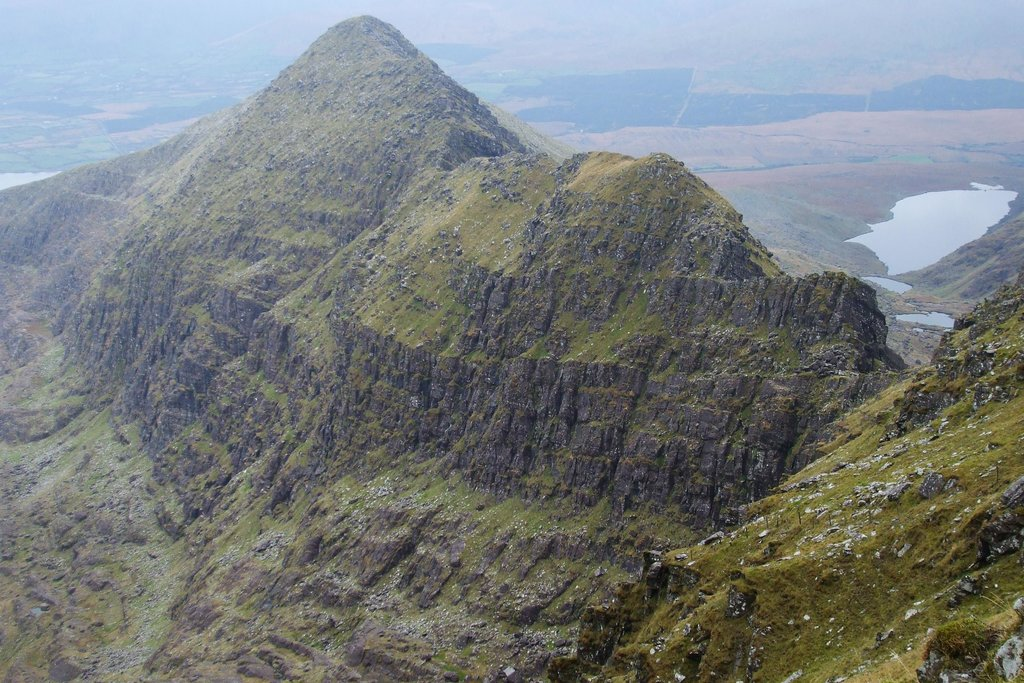
Benagh (left), and Faha Ridge (middle), from Brandon North Top

The full ridge walk of the entire Mount Brandon range, regarded as "one of the finest ridge walks in Ireland", crosses the full 15-kilometre (9.3 mi) ridge of the Brandon Group from the Conor Pass to Masatiompan and takes 6–7 hours. The route from the Conor Pass to Mount Brandon and back to the Conor Pass is even longer, at 21 kilometres (13 mi) and takes up to 8 hours to complete.

== List of peaks ==
The following is a download from the MountainViews Online Database, who list 15 Brandon Group peaks over 100 metres.

Furth (or Irish Munro): Height over 3,000 feet (914 m), and on the SMC Furth list.
Marilyn: Any height, and prominence over 150 metres (492 ft).

Peaks of the Brandon Group (MountainViews Online Database, October 2018)
Height Rank	Prom. Rank	Name	Irish Name (if different)	Translation	Height (m)	Prom. (m)	Height (ft)	Prom. (ft)	Topo Map	OSI Grid Reference
1	1	Brandon	Cnoc Bréanainn	Brendan's Hill	952	934	3,122	3,064	70	Q460116
2	13	Brandon North Top	—	—	895	23	2,938	76	70	Q461125
3	14	Brandon Far North Top	—	—	840	17	2,756	57	70	Q459128
4	3	Brandon Peak	Barr an Ghéaráin	Top of the Fang (Note: From the vicinity of Cloghane church there is a strange optical illusion whereby this peak seems higher than the summit, though it is actually over 100m lower.)	840	190	2,756	623	70	Q472095
5	6	Benagh	Binn Faiche	Peak of Faha (Note: "An Fhaiche / Faha is the name of the townland in which this peak is situated. The grotto at which the traditional ascent of the mountain begins is further down in the same townland. The walls E of the summit were identified as the remains of an inland promontory fort by archaeologist Barry Raftery. For information on this fort, see Archaeology Ireland Heritage Guide No. 29 (published March 2005)".)	822	57	2,697	187	70	Q469119
6	8	Faha Ridge	Na Poirt	The Fortifications	809	44	2,654	144	70	Q464120
7	10	Gearhane	An Géarán	The Fang	803	26	2,635	85	70	Q468087
8	11	Brandon South Top	Faill na nDeamhan	Cliff of the Demons (Note: Máire MacNeill comments on the place-names around Brandon as follows: From An Seabhac's compendium of the place-names of the district we learn that several places on the mountain have names suggestive of myths which recur at other Lughnasa sites, e.g. Macha an Mhíl (the Beast's Pasture), Faill na nDeamhan (the Demons' Cliff), Com na Caillighe (the Hag's Recess), Loch na Mná (the Woman's Lake), Cnoc an Tairbh (the Bull's Hill), etc.)	790	25	2,592	82	70	Q468107
9	4	Masatiompan	Más an Tiompáin	Hollow (Note: Tiompán can also mean a deep sheltered cove. Nearby there is such a cove at Sauce Creek.)	762	109	2,500	358	70	Q465145
10	9	Piaras Mór	—	Big Pierce (Note: This name is interpreted as 'big Pierce' in the Ordnance Survey Name Book. However, An Seabhac reports that in his time, nearly a century later, nobody in the locality had an explanation for the name but they did not think it was related to the personal name Piaras. There is a lower peak to the N called Piaras Beag. On the saddle between Piaras Mór and Masatiompan is an ogham stone bearing an inscription which translates as: Ronan, the priest son son of Camogann. There is a chi-ro monogram (representing 'Christ') above it and a Greek cross in a circle on the other side (Barrington, Discovering Kerry, 180).)	746	33	2,447	108	70	Q464136
11	15	Piaras Mór thuaidh barr	—	—	700	12	2,297	38	70	Q464138
12	2	Ballysitteragh	An Scraig	Rocky Outcrop (Note: Also known as Cnoc Bhaile Uí Shé [OSI], 'hill of Baile Uí Shé', from Ballyhea(-bought) townland. The English form Ballysitteragh could be from Baile Suiteoireach, 'the townland of the camp/barracks', but the circumstances of its naming are unclear. Coumhenry, Coumgraig and Coumthrive are hollows below the mountain on the N. side.)	623	218	2,044	715	70	Q460057
13	12	Beennabrack	Binn na mBroc (Note: Paul Tempan notes that the Irish name Macha na gCab and the anglicised name Beennabrack have very different meanings. It seems unlikely that they originally referred to the same feature. An Seabhac gives the name Binn na mBroc ('peak of the badgers') for this hill (TCCD, 143, 233), which shows that Beennabrack is a corruption. He does not mention Macha na gCab.); Macha na gCab	Peak of the Badgers; Plain of the Beaks	609	24	1,996	77	70	Q469054
14	7	An Bhinn Dubh	—	The Black Peak	479	51	1,572	166	70	Q483056
15	5	Faill an tSáis	—	Cliff of the Noose (Note: Sauce Creek is derived from Irish sás, 'noose', a name referring to the fact that waves and currents make it very difficult to leave this cove by boat.)	431	106	1,413	348	70	Q497150

== Pilgrimage ==
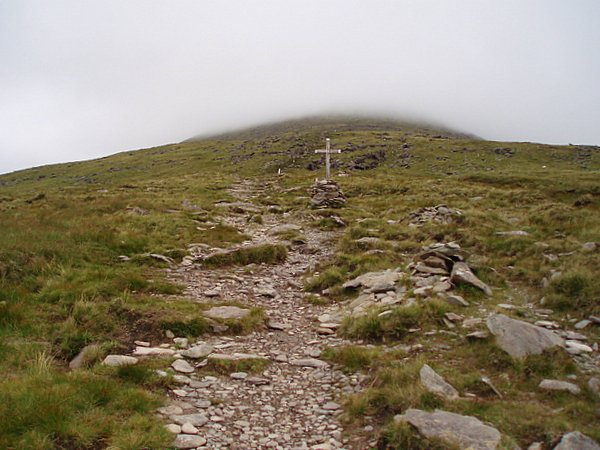
Cosán na Naomh at 500 metres

Due to its link with Saint Brendan, the mountain is popular with Irish Catholic pilgrims. The mountain's relative height and status of being at an extreme westerly point appears to have been of great importance to Saint Brendan. A pilgrimage route called Cosán na Naomh ("The Saints Road") begins at Cill Mhic an Domhnaigh (Kilvickadowning) on Ventry Strand at the southern end of the Dingle peninsula, and ends at Séipéilín Bréanainn ("Brendan's Oratory") on Brandon's summit. Sáipéilín Bréanainn is the remains of a stone building believed to have been used by Saint Brendan. The path to the peak is marked by small white crosses and the peak itself is topped by a large metal cross. It is speculated the pilgrimage originated in pre-Christian times as a Lughnasadh ritual.

In 1997, the Irish Heritage Council set up the Pilgrim Paths Project to restore walking routes along Irish medieval pilgrimage paths. One of the routes chosen was Cosán na Naomh, and an 18–kilometre way-marked trail was constructed between Ventry Strand and the grotto at Ballybrack at the foot of Mount Brandon. The trail has been developed to the standard required by the Irish Sports Council for National Waymarked Trails in Ireland. For safety reasons, it was decided not to mark the trail to the end of the medieval route at the summit of Brandon, but to finish at Ballybrack. The starting point at Ventry is one of the places pilgrims would have come ashore. The trail passes a number of important ecclesiastical heritage sites including Gallarus Oratory and Kilmalkedar monastic site.

== Aircraft accidents ==
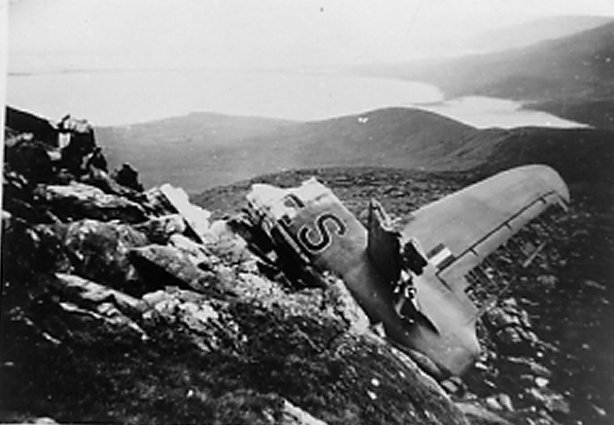
Wreckage of Sunderland Aircraft, Faha Ridge 1943.

Between 1940 and 1943 a number of Allied and Axis aircraft crashed on Brandon and the Faha Ridge.

- 20 August 1940: A Luftwaffe Focke-Wulf Fw 200 Condor crash-landed on Faha Ridge, the crew of six survived and were the first known aircrew from Germany to land in Ireland during the Second World War. A plaque commemorating this event is on display in O'Connor's Bar and Guest House in Cloghane Village.
- 28 July 1943: A BOAC Civilian Short Sunderland III Flying Boat crashed due to a navigation error onto the lower slopes of Mount Brandon while flying from West Africa to Foynes Flying Boat Base. Ten of the twenty-five on board were killed in the wreck. An anchor from the wreck is in O'Connor's Bar and Guest House.
- 22 August 1943: A RAF Short Sunderland III Flying Boat belonging to 201 Squadron crashed while flying a patrol in the Atlantic, out of Castle Archdale. It crashed into the lower slopes of Mount Brandon. Eight of the crew of eleven were killed. A plaque commemorating those killed is in O'Connor's Bar and Guest House.
- 20 December 1943: A RAF Vickers Wellington belonging to 304 Squadron based out of Predannack Airfield crashed directly into Mount Brandon. All of the six Polish crew members were killed. Engines from the wreck are also on display in O'Connor's Bar.

== Gallery ==
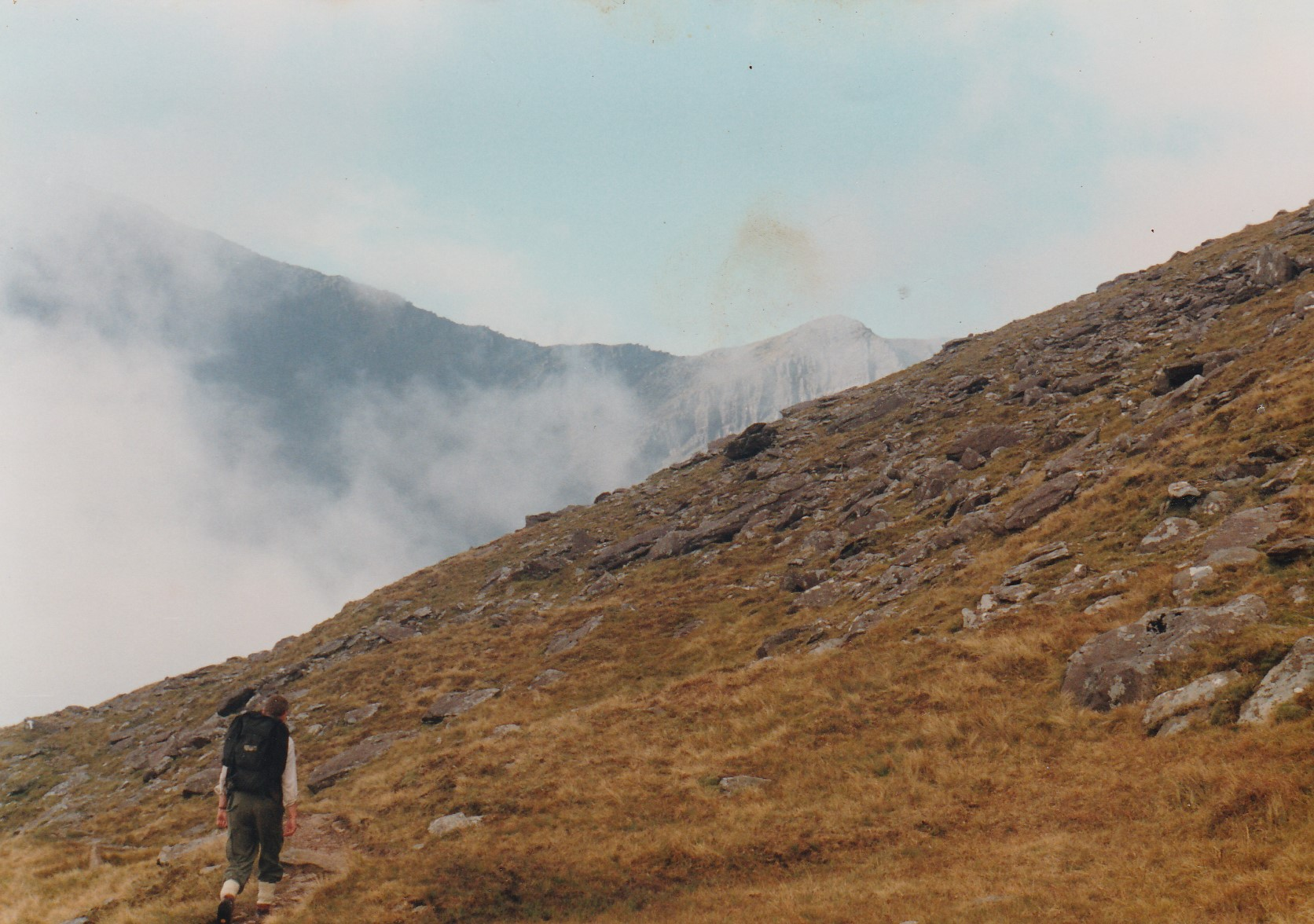
Ascending the mountain

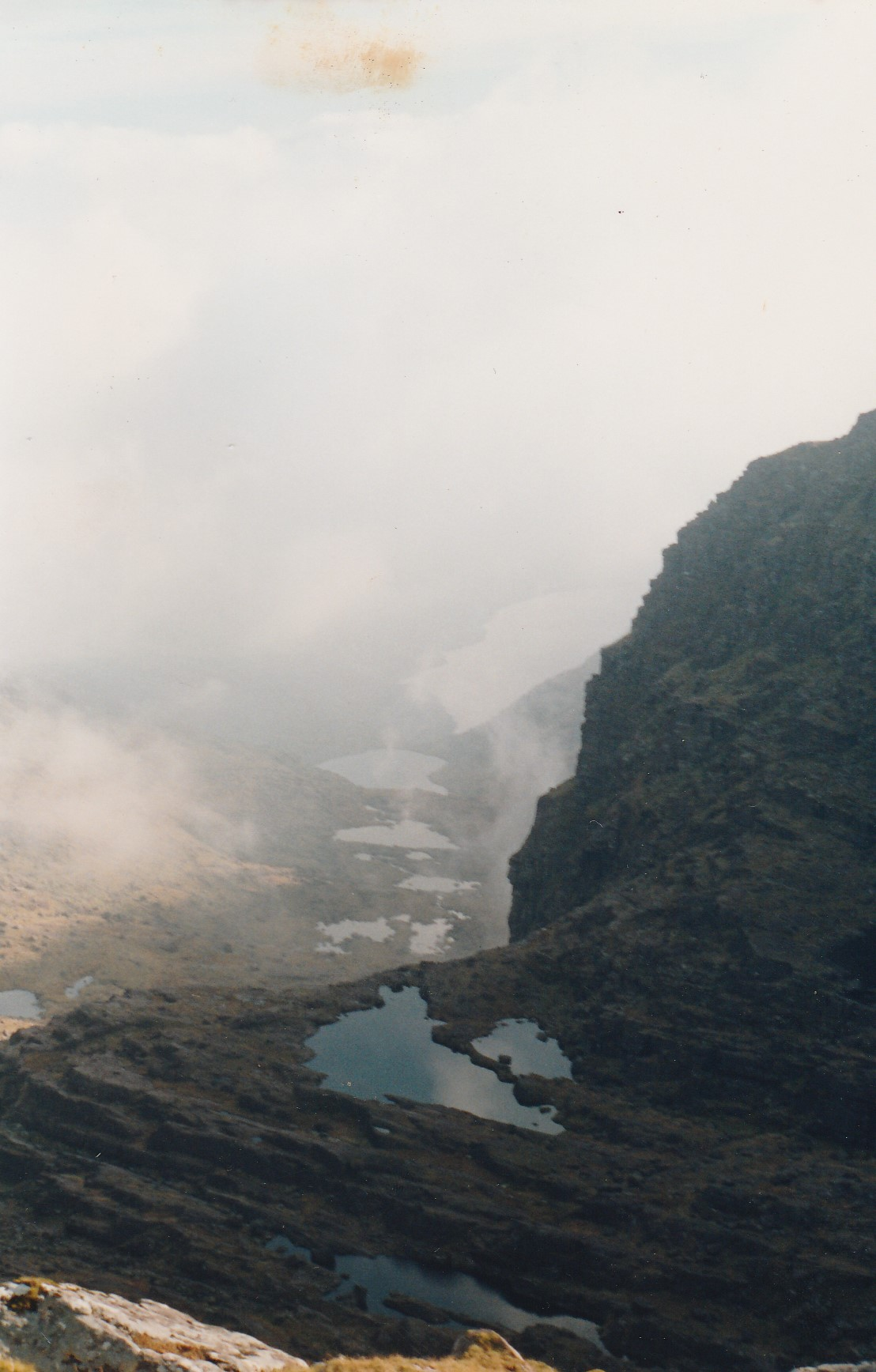
Paternoster lakes on the mountain

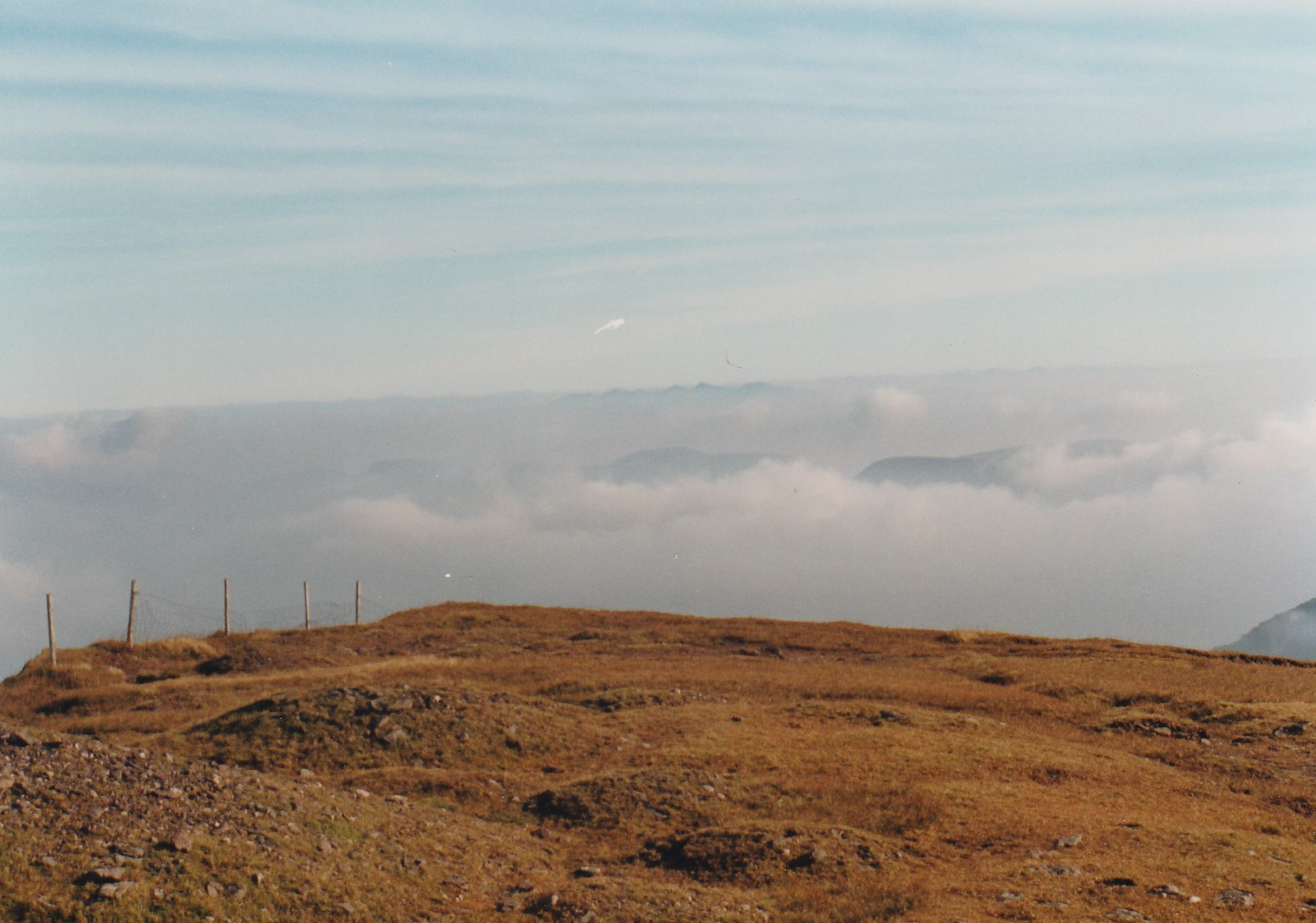
Looking across from Mount Brandon towards Carrauntoohil in the clouds

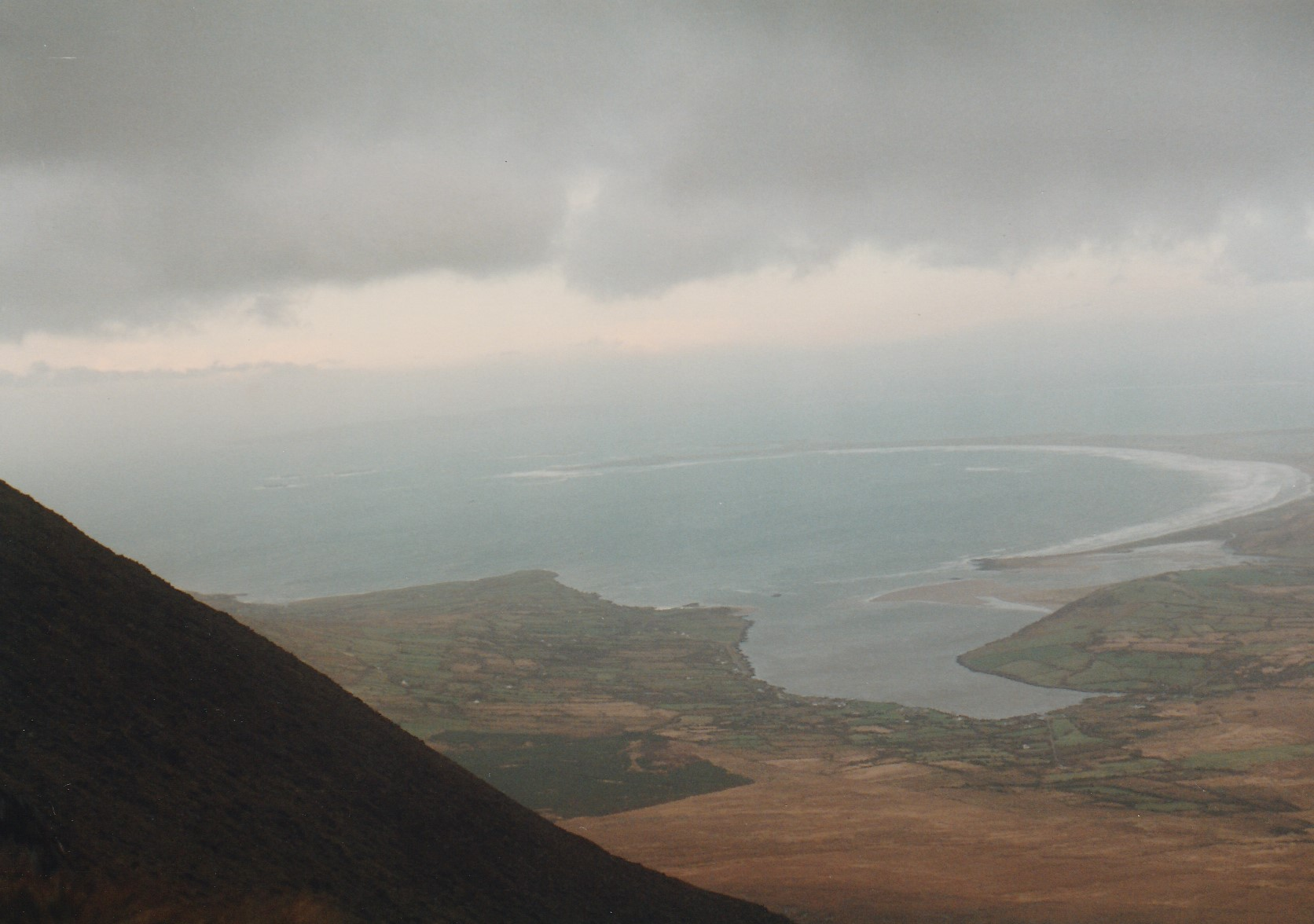
Looking towards the curve of Stradbally Beach, 1993

== See also ==
- List of Furth mountains in the British Isles
- List of mountains of the British Isles by height
- List of P600 mountains in the British Isles
- Lists of mountains in Ireland
