= Panagia, Thasos =

Panagia Παναγία
- Community
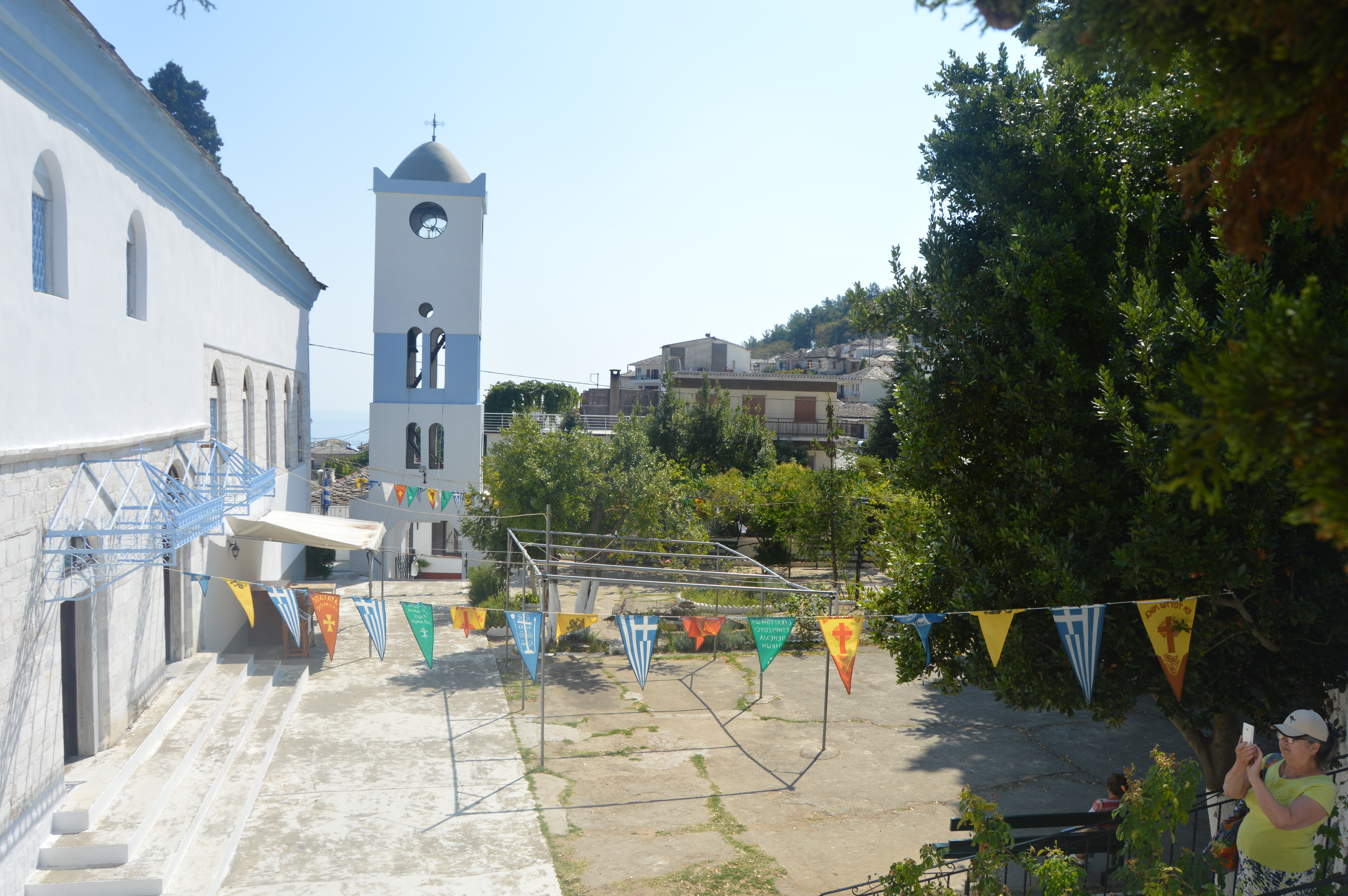
- Church of the Assumption of the Blessed Virgin Mary

- Location within Greece
- Coordinates: 40°44′N 24°44′E
- Country: Greece
- Administrative region: East Macedonia and Thrace
- Regional unit: Thasos
- Municipality: Thasos
- Elevation: 1,108 m (3,635 ft)

Population (2021)
  - Community: 739
- Time zone: UTC+2 (EET)
  - Summer (DST): UTC+3 (EEST)
- Website: www.thassos.gr

Panagia (Greek: Παναγία) is a village on the island of Thasos in northern Greece. The village is located in the northwest of the island, east of the massif of Mount Ipsarion (1,204 m (3,950 ft)) at an elevation of 300 m (980 ft). The village is a popular tourist spot due to its proximity to Potamia and the coastal resort of Skala Potamia and Skala Panagia, referred to in English as Golden Beach. Tourist sights include traditional Greek village buildings and water fountains from the freshwater stream with its source at Mount Ipsarion which run through the village.
