= Kavala Municipal Museum =

Museum in Greece

Coordinates: 40°56′15.39″N 24°24′46.32″E

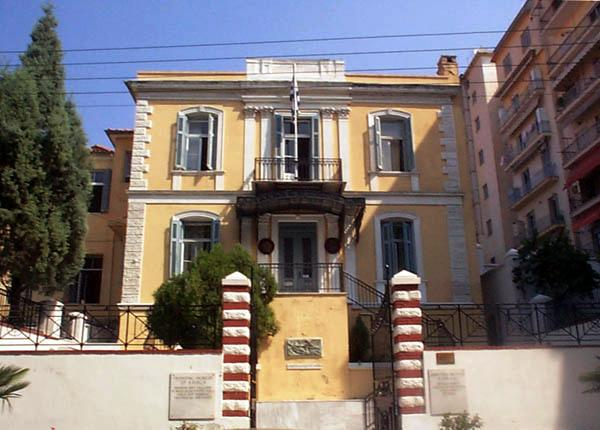
View from outside

The Kavala Municipal Museum opened in 1986 in a two-story neoclassical building in Kavala city centre, very close to the Town Hall. Early in 2001, the museum moved to a tobacco warehouse, in Kapnergati Square, a much larger space. The museum includes a gallery of modern art (the museum has over a hundred works by such artists as Panos Gravalos, Stathis Haradzidis, Meropi Preka, Dimitris Kakoulidis, Klearhos Loukopoulos), a gallery of local painters (Vassikaridis, Miltonas and others) and the archive and sculpture gallery of Greek-born US sculptor Polygnotos Vagis.

Vagis was born in 1894 on Thasos, but emigrated to America, where he became a sculptor. He is regarded as one of the most outstanding sculptors of the twentieth century. He died in 1965 and bequeathed his personal collection of sculpture to the Greek state. It includes his Moons, Cyclops (1939, stone), Prophet (1925, marble), Groundhog (1933, chestnut), and Kouroi (plaster). Much of his work is also exhibited in the Polygnotos Vagis Municipal Museum at his birthplace of Potamia, on the island of Thasos.

Between the ground floor and the first floor, appropriately designed showcases display a collection of birds which was assembled by Dr Anastassios Hourmouziadis and includes many species from the Nestos wetland, some now extinct. The Folklore Museum occupies the first floor, with exhibits that include folk costumes (mainly of the Sarakatsani), jewelry, embroidery, everyday utensils, tools of various trades, porcelain and metal stoves and gramophones. The museum has run a number of educational programmes for schoolchildren on the themes of folklore and environmental awareness.

The museum also houses the city's history archive, which contains material from the Greek and British Foreign ministries, the archive of the Workers Centre and an archive of photographs and cinema films connected with the history of Kavala.

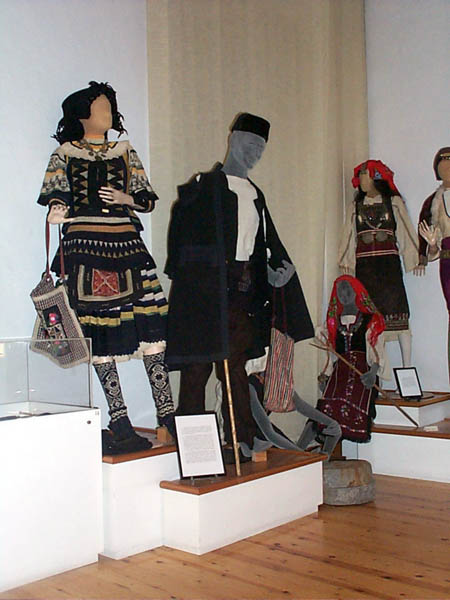
Costumes of Sarakatsani

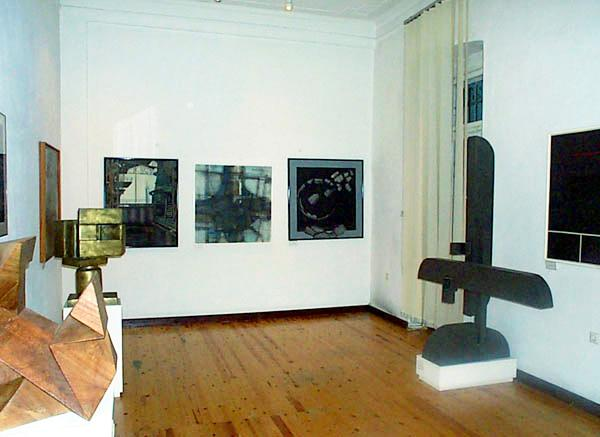
Gallery

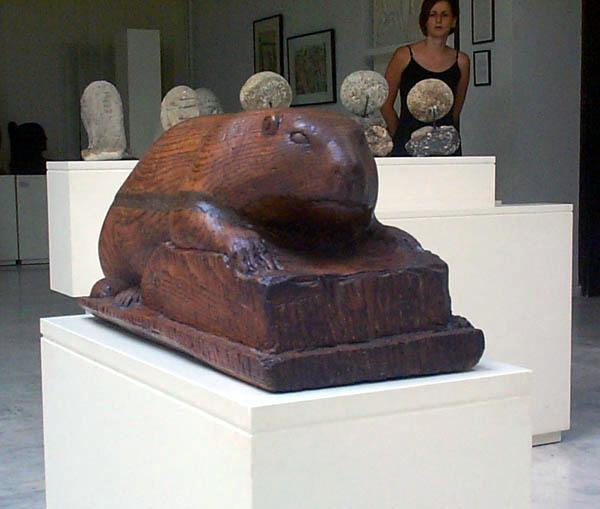
Groundhog

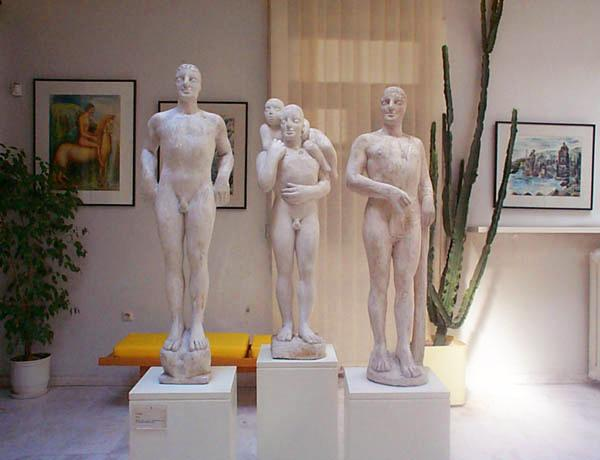
Kouroi

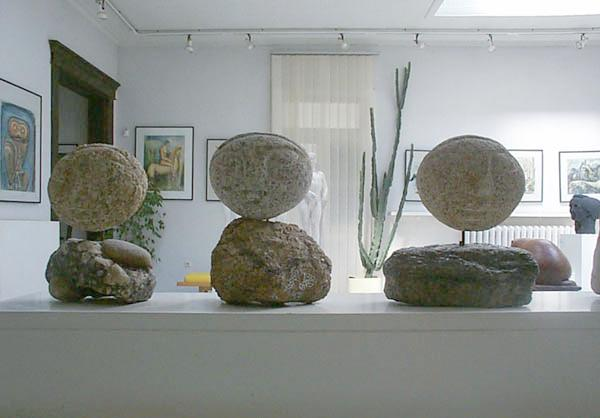
Moons

== Sources ==
- This article incorporates text from the corresponding article at the Museums of Macedonia website, commissioned by the Macedonian Heritage foundation, written by Vlasis Vlasidis, and published under a CC-BY-SA-3.0 license.
