= Polygnotos Vagis Municipal Museum =

Museum in Potamia, Thasos, Greece

Coordinates: 40°42′57″N 24°43′44″E

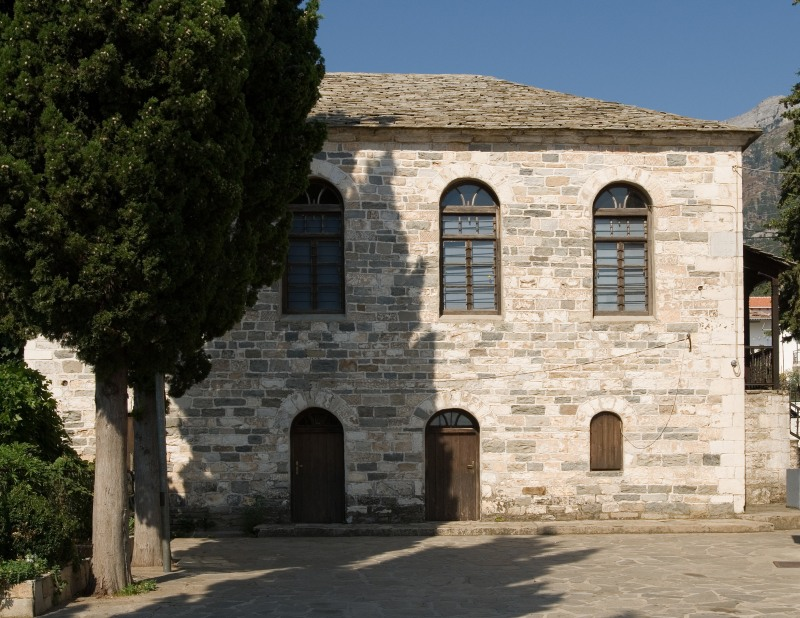
External view

The Polygnotos Vagis Municipal Museum is located in the village of Potamia on the island of Thasos, Greece, 14 km from the main town of Limenas. It was established in August 1981 and is dedicated to the life and work of Polygnotos Vagis, a renowned artist who was born in the village. The museum is housed in a two-storey stone building, formerly the primary school, in the center of the village.

The museum‘s collection consists of 98 sculptures by Vagis. Of these, 25 are very small in size and are therefore displayed together in a single showcase. There are also fifteen of Vagis’s paintings from the period 1920–60. The works of his first period (1919–30) are mostly inspired by ancient Greek history and mythology and modern Greek history. His materials are plaster, bronze and marble. The works of his second period (1932 onwards) tend to be semi-abstract in style and are cast in bronze or concrete, or sculpted in stone, marble, wood or granite. They are figures and heads, stylised moons, eagles, and fish.

There are also a number of monumental works, such as the Bear with Newborn Cub, Cosmos, and a number of miniature sculptures.

In addition to this museum, his work is exhibited internationally (Brooklyn Museum, in the Whitney Museum of American Art in New York, the Toledo Museum of Art in Ohio, the Tel Aviv Museum of Art in Israel) and within Greece (Municipal Museum of Kavala and outdoors in Thessaloniki).

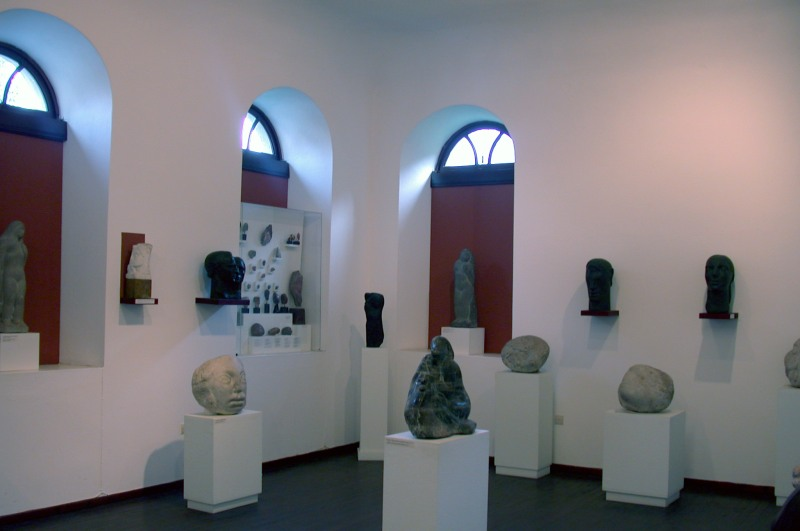
Interior View 1

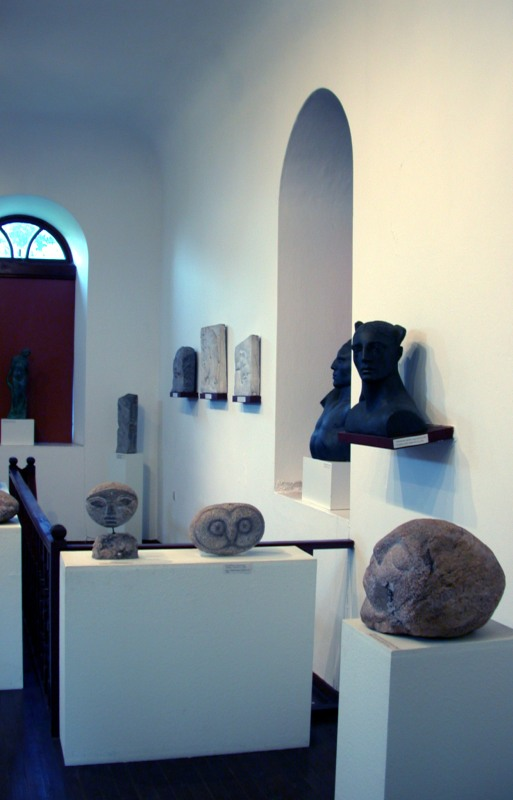
Interior View 2

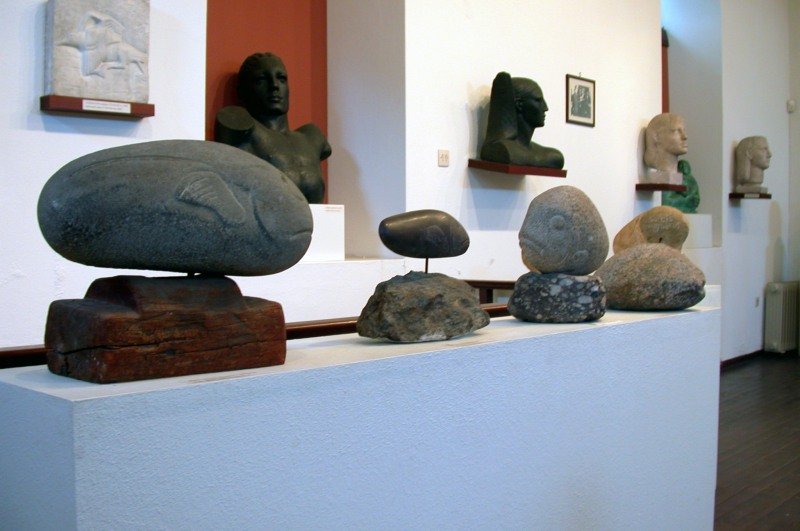
Interior View 3

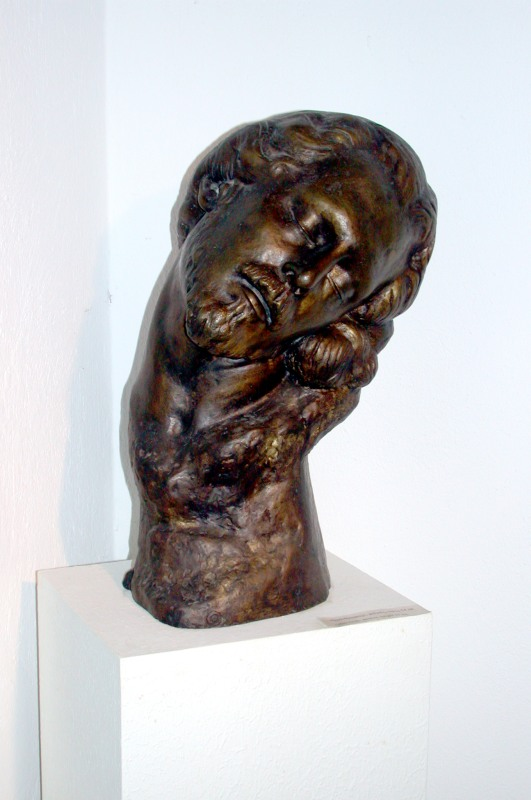
Man God

== Sources ==
- This article incorporates text from the corresponding article at the Museums of Macedonia website, commissioned by the Macedonian Heritage foundation, written by Vlasis Vlasidis, and published under a CC-BY-SA-3.0 license.
