= Kallirachi, Thasos =

Kallirachi Καλλιράχη
- Community
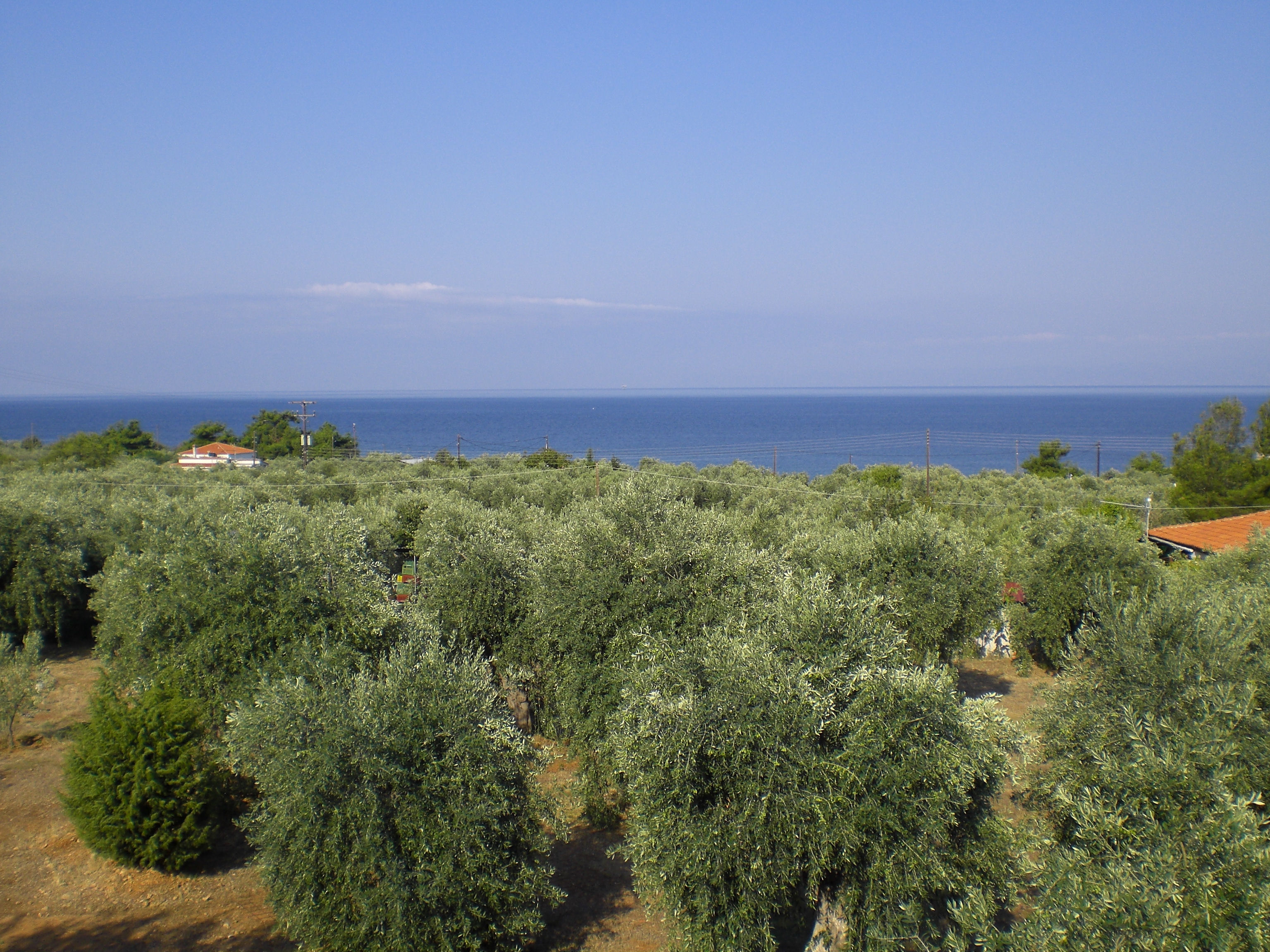
- Olive tree grove in Kallirachi

- Location within Greece
- Coordinates: 40°42′N 24°33′E
- Country: Greece
- Administrative region: East Macedonia and Thrace
- Regional unit: Thasos
- Municipality: Thasos
- Elevation: 145 m (476 ft)
- Highest elevation: 220 m (720 ft)

Population (2021)
  - Community: 971
- Time zone: UTC+2 (EET)
  - Summer (DST): UTC+3 (EEST)
- Website: www.thassos.gr

Kallirachi (Greek: Καλλιράχη) is a village on the island of Thasos in northern Greece. As of 2021 the village has a population of 971. The village is located at an average height of 145 m.a.s.l., on the western slope of Mount Metamorphosis.

== History ==
In tradition, on a hill above the village is located the grave of Sabellius (fl. ca. 215), a priest and theologian banished to the island of Thasos as a heretic. To the west of the village (2.5 km) is the location of a village under the same name (Skala Kallirachi), where the original sixteenth-century village was located, before being abandoned and its residents seeking refuge inland, due to pirate raids. In the Ottoman tahrir defter (number 75) of 1519, the settlement was recorded as a town with the name Kakirahkalesi.

== Economy ==
The main economic activity of the residents is based on tourism and olive grove plantations in the surrounding area of the village.
