= Polygnotos Vagis =

Greek-American sculptor and painter

- Born: 1894; Potamia, Thasos
- Died: March 15, 1965 (aged 70–71); New York City, U.S.
- Resting place: Potamia, Thasos, Greece
- Education: Institute of Fine Arts
- Known for: Sculpting, painting
- Style: Simplistic, primitive art
- Awards: Audubon Artists Gold Medal (1958); Golden Cross of the Phoenix (1962)

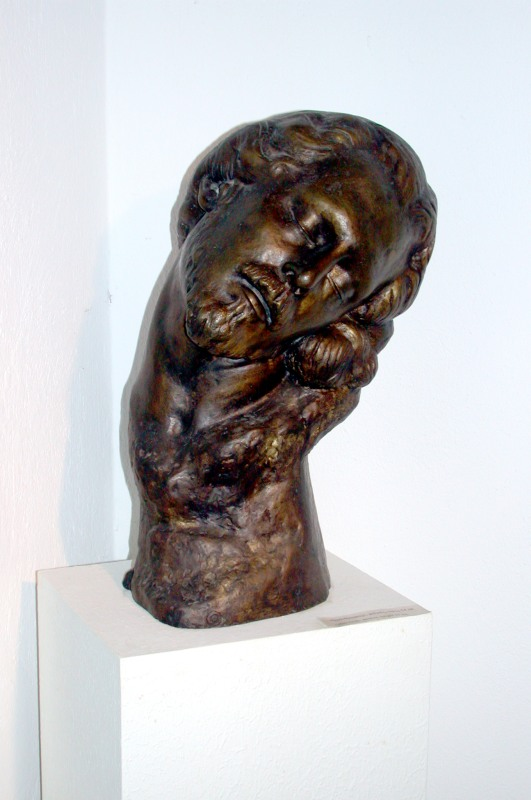
Man God, image from the Municipal Museum, Potamia, Thasos, East Macedonia, Greece

Polygnotos Vagis (Greek: Πολύγνωτος Βαγής) (1894 – March 15, 1965) was a Greek-American sculptor and painter.

== Biography ==
He was born in Potamia, Thasos, and his father, Hatzigeorgiou, was a carpenter. He immigrated to New York in 1911 and dealt with sculpture. He studied at the Institute of Fine Arts and maintained a workshop in New York City for decades.

In his works he used stone, cement, and emphasized simplistic lines, an example of his connection with primitive art. He focused primarily on human and animal forms and on compositions such as the moon and the world. His works are on display at the Whitney Museum of Art, the Museum of Modern Art New York (MOMA), the National Gallery (Athens), the Houston Museum of Fine Arts, the Kavala Municipal Museum, etc.

In 1958 he was awarded the Audubon Artists Gold Medal and in 1962 with the Golden Cross of the Phoenix.

During the last years of his life he inherited much of his collection in the Greek state. Today in his hometown of Potamia, Thassos, there is a museum named after him, which houses 98 sculptures and 15 paintings.

He died on March 15, 1965, in New York City and was buried in Potamia, Thassos.
