= Thasos =

Greek island in the North Aegean Sea

Thasos Θάσος
- Regional unit and municipality
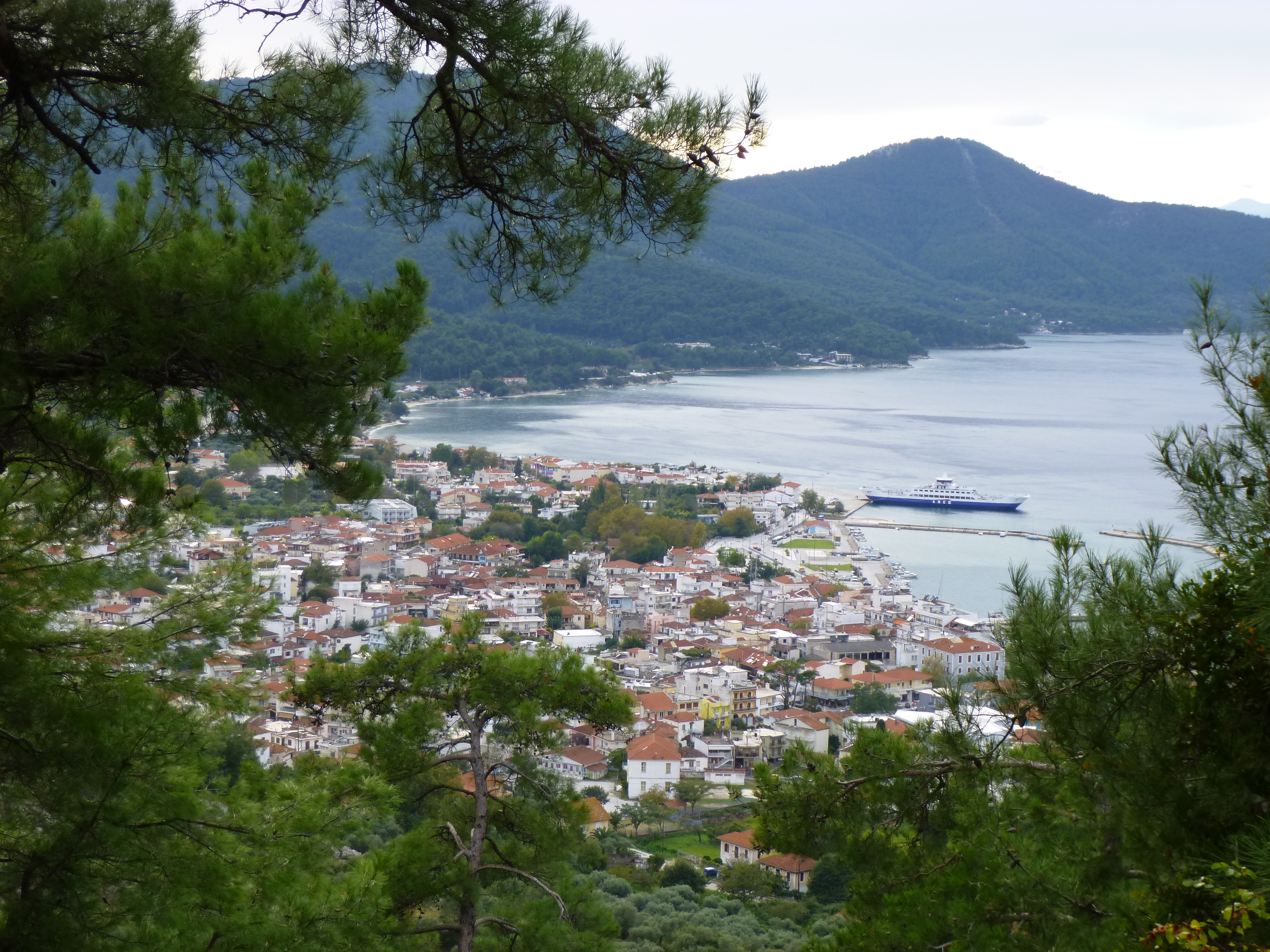
- Limenas (port) of Thasos, capital of the island

- Thasos within Eastern Macedonia and Thrace

- Location within Greece
- Coordinates: 40°41′N 24°39′E
- Country: Greece
- Administrative region: Eastern Macedonia and Thrace
- Seat: Thasos

Government
  - Mayor: Eleftherios Kyriakidis (since 2019)

Area
  - Municipality: 380 km^{2} (150 sq mi)
- Elevation: 1,205 m (3,953 ft)

Population (2021)
  - Municipality: 13,104
  - Density: 34/km^{2} (89/sq mi)
- Time zone: UTC+2 (EET)
  - Summer (DST): UTC+3 (EEST)
- Postal code: 640 04
- Area code: 25930
- Vehicle registration: ΚΒ

Thasos (Greek: Θάσος [ˈθasos]) is a Greek island in the northern Aegean Sea. It is the northernmost major Greek island, and 12th largest by area.

The island has an area of 380 km^{2} and a population of about 13,000. It forms a separate regional unit within the East Macedonia and Thrace region. Before the local administration reform of 2011, it was part of the Kavala Prefecture. The largest town and the capital is Thasos, officially known as Limenas Thasou, "Port of Thasos", situated on the northern side. It is connected with the mainland by regular ferry lines between Keramoti and Thasos town, and between the regional centre of Kavala and Skala Prinou.

The most important economic activity on the island is tourism. The main agricultural products are honey, almonds, walnuts, olives (such as the local Throumba variety which has a protected designation of origin), olive oil, and wine. The inhabitants also engage in fishing, and in the herding of sheep and goats.

== History ==
=== Mythology ===
Staphylus (Ancient Greek: Στάφυλος), the beloved son of god Dionysus, lived in Thasos.

=== Prehistory ===
Lying close to the coast of Eastern Macedonia, Thasos was inhabited from the Palaeolithic period onwards, but the earliest settlement to have been explored in detail is that at Limenaria, where remains from the Middle and Late Neolithic relate closely to those found at the mainland's Drama plain. In contrast, Early Bronze Age remains on the island align it with the Aegean culture of the Cyclades and Sporades, to the south; at Skala Sotiros for example, a small settlement was encircled by a strongly built defensive wall. Even earlier activity is demonstrated by the presence of large pieces of 'megalithic' anthropomorphic stelai built into these walls, which, so far, have no parallels in the Aegean area.

There is then a gap in the archaeological record until the end of the Bronze Age, c. 1100 BC, when the first burials took place at the large cemetery of Kastri in the interior of the island. Here tombs covered with small mounds of earth were typical until the end of the Iron Age. In the earliest tombs there was a small quantity of locally imitated Mycenaean pottery, but the majority of the hand-made pottery with incised decoration reflects connections eastwards, with Thrace and beyond.

=== Antiquity ===
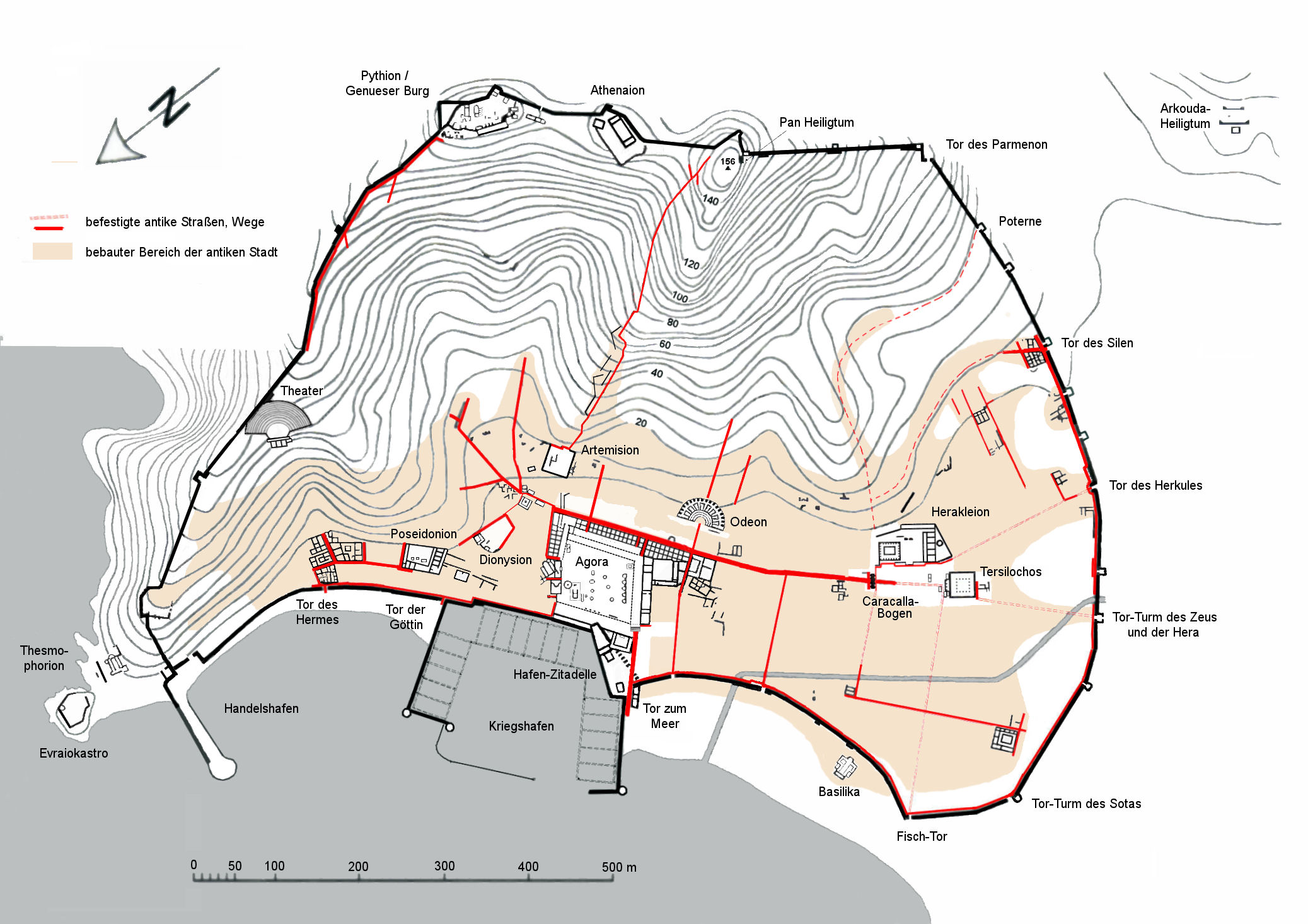
Plan of Thasos

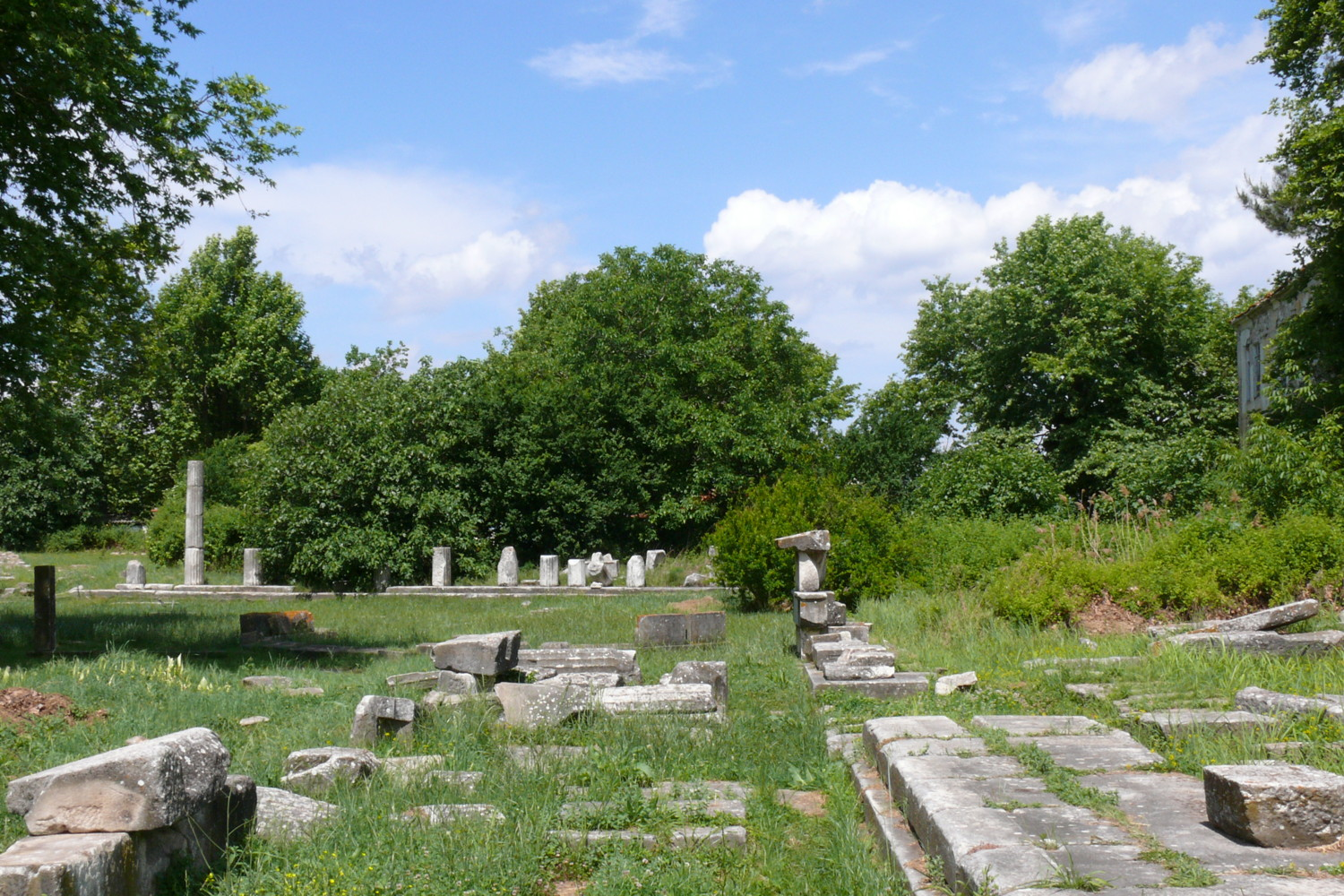
Ancient Agora of Thasos

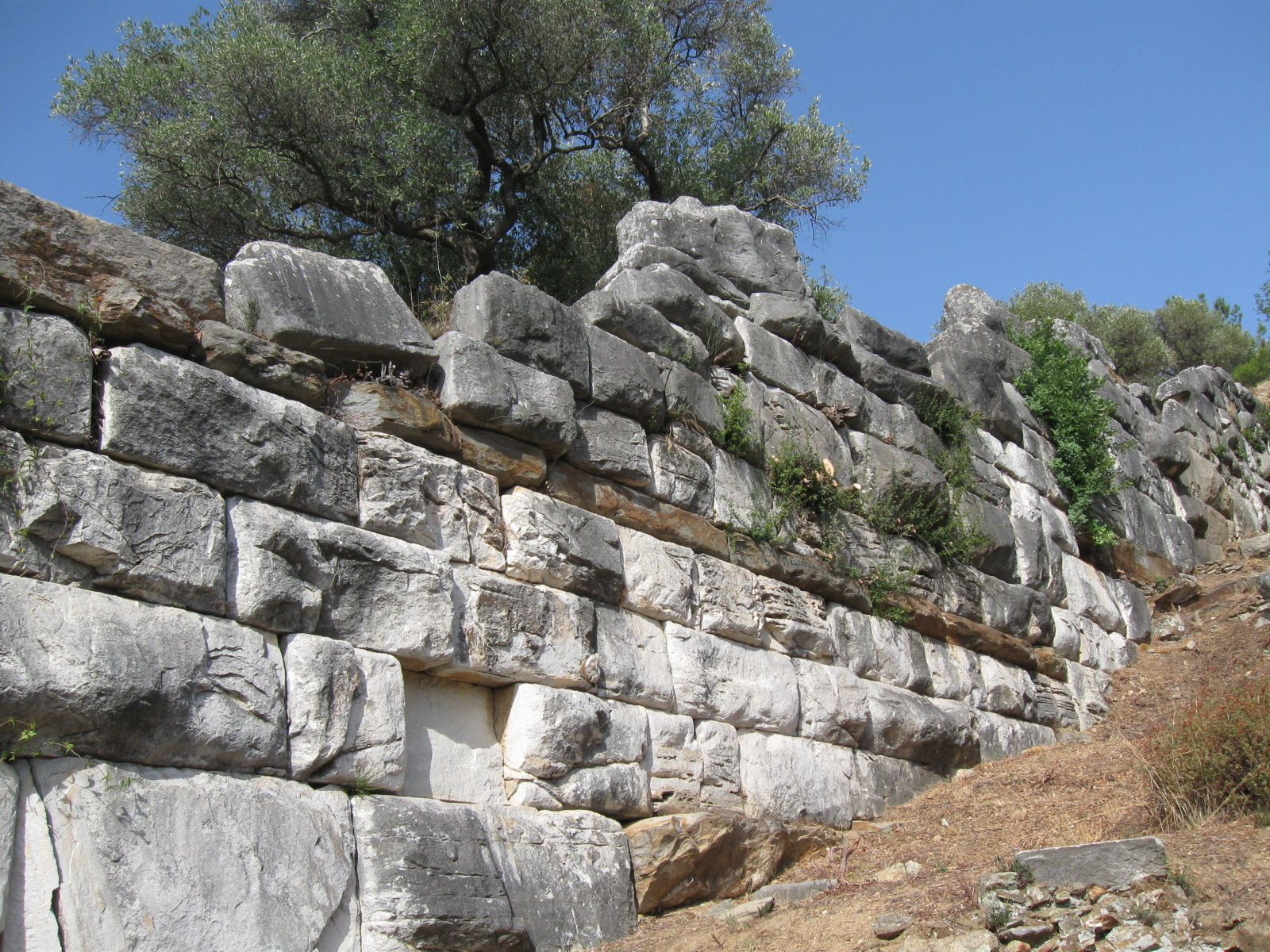
City walls of Thasos

The island was colonised at an early date by Phoenicians, attracted probably by its gold mines; they founded a temple to the god Melqart, whom the Greeks identified as "Tyrian Heracles", and whose cult was merged with Heracles in the course of the island's Hellenization. In the 5th century BC, Herodotus visited a sanctuary of Heracles on Thasos, presumably the Heracleion still visible today, and reported that it had been built by the Phoenicians. An eponymous Thasos or Thasus, son of Phoenix (or of Agenor, as Pausanias reported) was said to have been the leader of the Phoenicians, and to have given his name to the island.

Around 650 BC, or a little earlier, Greeks from Paros founded a colony on Thasos. A generation or so later, the poet Archilochus, a descendant of these colonists, wrote of casting away his shield during a minor war against an indigenous Thracian tribe, the Saians. Thasian power extended to the mainland, where the Thasians owned gold mines even more valuable than those of the island; their combined annual revenues amounted to between 200 and 300 Attic talents. Herodotus says that the best mines on the island were those opened by the Phoenicians on the east side, facing Samothrace. Archilochus described Thasos as "an ass's backbone crowned with wild wood." The island's capital, Thasos, had two harbours. Besides its gold mines, the wine, nuts and marble of Thasos were well known in antiquity. Thasian wine was quite famous. Thasian coinage bore images of the wine-god Dionysos and grape bunches.

During the Ionian revolt against Persia, Thasos was under Persian domination. After the capture of Miletus (494 BC), Histiaeus, the Ionian leader, laid siege to Thasos, without success. In response, the Thasians built warships and strengthened their fortifications, but this provoked the suspicions of Darius I of Persia, who compelled them to surrender their ships and pull down their walls. After the defeat of Xerxes I the Thasians joined the Delian League but left in a disagreement over their mainland mines and markets.

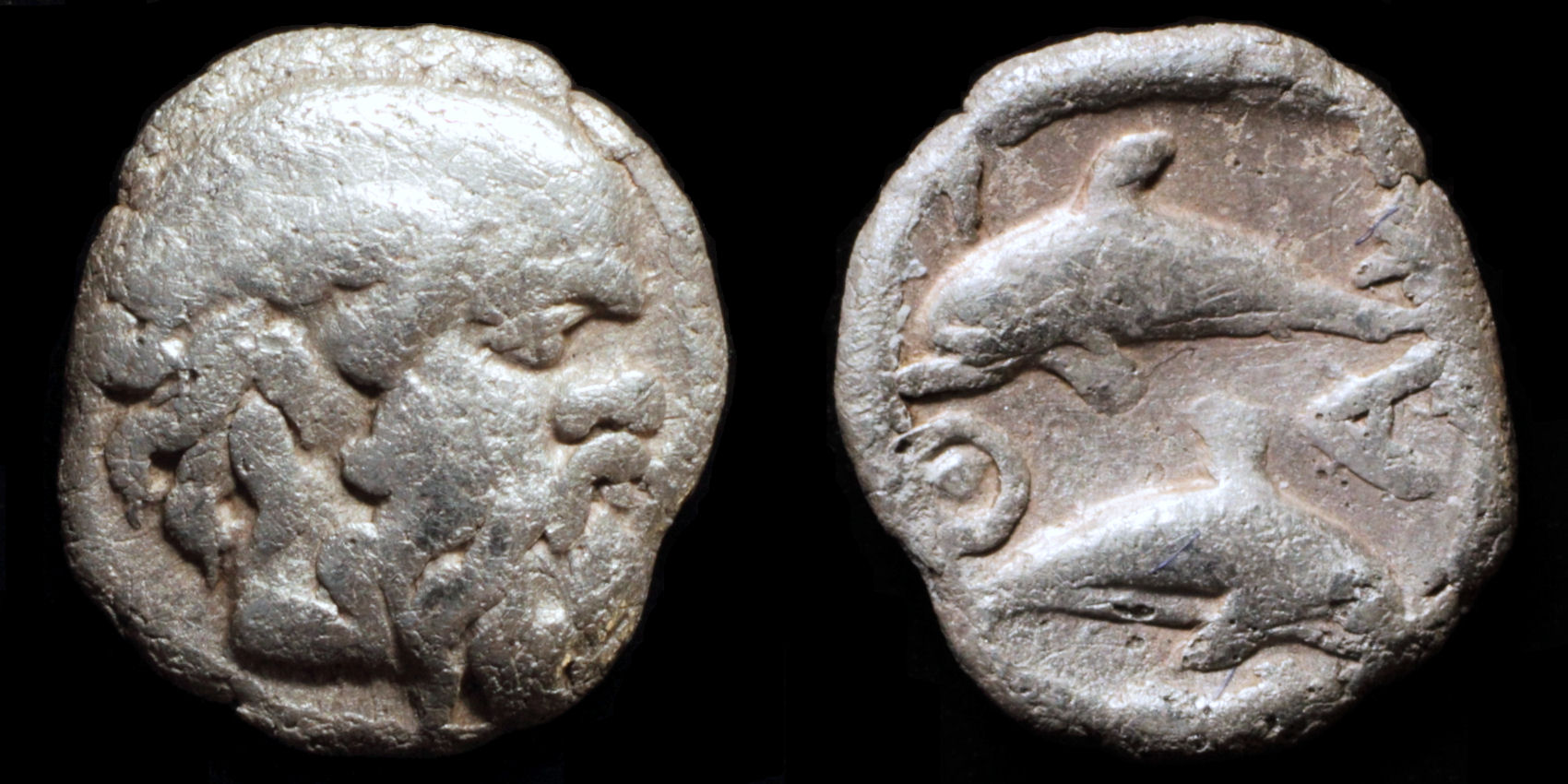
Silver tritartemorion struck in Thasos c. 411–404 BC. Satyr on the obverse and dolphins on the reverse

The Athenians eventually defeated Thasos's navy, and took the capital after a two-year siege. The Thasians were made to destroy their walls, surrender their ships and their mainland possessions, and pay a regular indemnity. In 411 BC, during a period of political instability at Athens, Thasos accepted a Lacedaemonian governor; but in 407 BC the partisans of Lacedaemon were expelled, and the Athenians under Thrasybulus were admitted.

After the Battle of Aegospotami (405 BC), Thasos again fell into the hands of the Lacedaemonians under Lysander but the Athenians must have recovered it, for it formed one of the subjects of dispute between them and Philip II of Macedonia. In the embroilment between Philip V of Macedonia and the Romans, Thasos submitted to Philip, but received its freedom at the hands of the Romans after the Battle of Cynoscephalae (197 BC), and it was still a nominally "free" state in the time of Pliny.

Excavations of various island sites between March and May 1887 by Theodore and Mabel Bent uncovered an 'Arch of Caracalla', and the collapsed remains of a unique portrait-statue of the emperor Hadrian's wife, the empress Flavia Vibia Sabina, with an inscription dedicated to her as a "high priestess".

=== Middle Ages ===
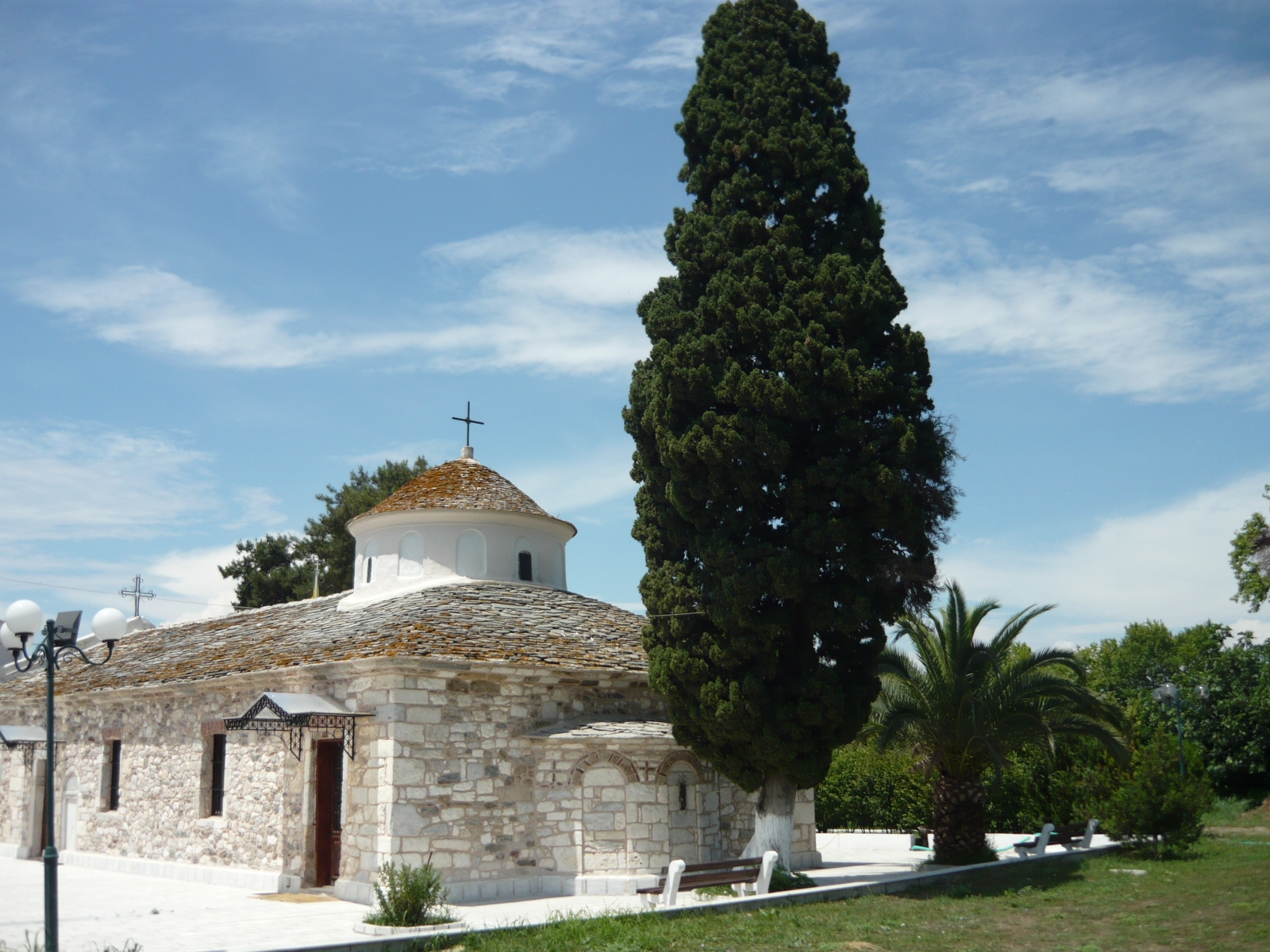
Byzantine church in Thasos

Thasos was part of the Byzantine Empire, from 395 on. According to the 6th century Synecdemus, it belonged to the province of Macedonia Prima, although the 10th century De thematibus claims that it was part of Thracia. The island was a major source of marble until the disruption of the Slavic invasions in the late 6th/7th centuries, and several churches from Late Antiquity have been found on it. The island remained in Byzantine hands for most of the Middle Ages. It functioned as a naval base in the 13th century, under its own doux, and came briefly under the rule of the Genoese Tedisio Zaccaria in 1307–13. Returning to Byzantine control, its bishopric was raised to an archdiocese by Manuel II Palaiologos. Thasos was captured by the Genoese Gattilusi family c. 1434, who surrendered it to the Ottoman Empire in 1455. Following the Ottoman conquest of the Despotate of the Morea in 1460, the former Despot Demetrios Palaiologos received lands on the island. It is related that the Byzantine Greek Saint Joannicius the Great (752–846) in one of his miracles freed the island of Thasos from a multitude of snakes.

=== Ottoman era ===
Thasos was incorporated into the Ottoman Empire in 1456. Under Ottoman rule, the island was known in Ottoman Turkish as طاشوز - Taşöz. Between 1770 and 1774, the island was briefly occupied by a Russian fleet. By this time its population had gravitated to the inland villages as a protective measure. Nearly 50 years later, a revolt against Ottoman rule arose in 1821, at the outbreak of the Greek War of Independence, led by Hatzigiorgis Metaxas, but it failed. The Ottoman Census of 1831 states that the island was populated exclusively by Greeks and that there were 1,821 Greek males fit to fight. This register excluded women, orphans, Christians below the age of puberty, the mentally or physically incapacitated as well as high-ranking officials, so the actual population would have been over double this.

The island had been given in 1813 by the Sultan Mahmud II to the Ottoman Albanian ruler Muhammad Ali of Egypt as a personal fiefdom, as a reward for his intervention against the Wahhabites. On 20 October 1912 during the First Balkan War, the Greek navy invaded Thasos and annexed it into Greece after more than 350 years of Ottoman Turkish rule.

=== Modern era ===
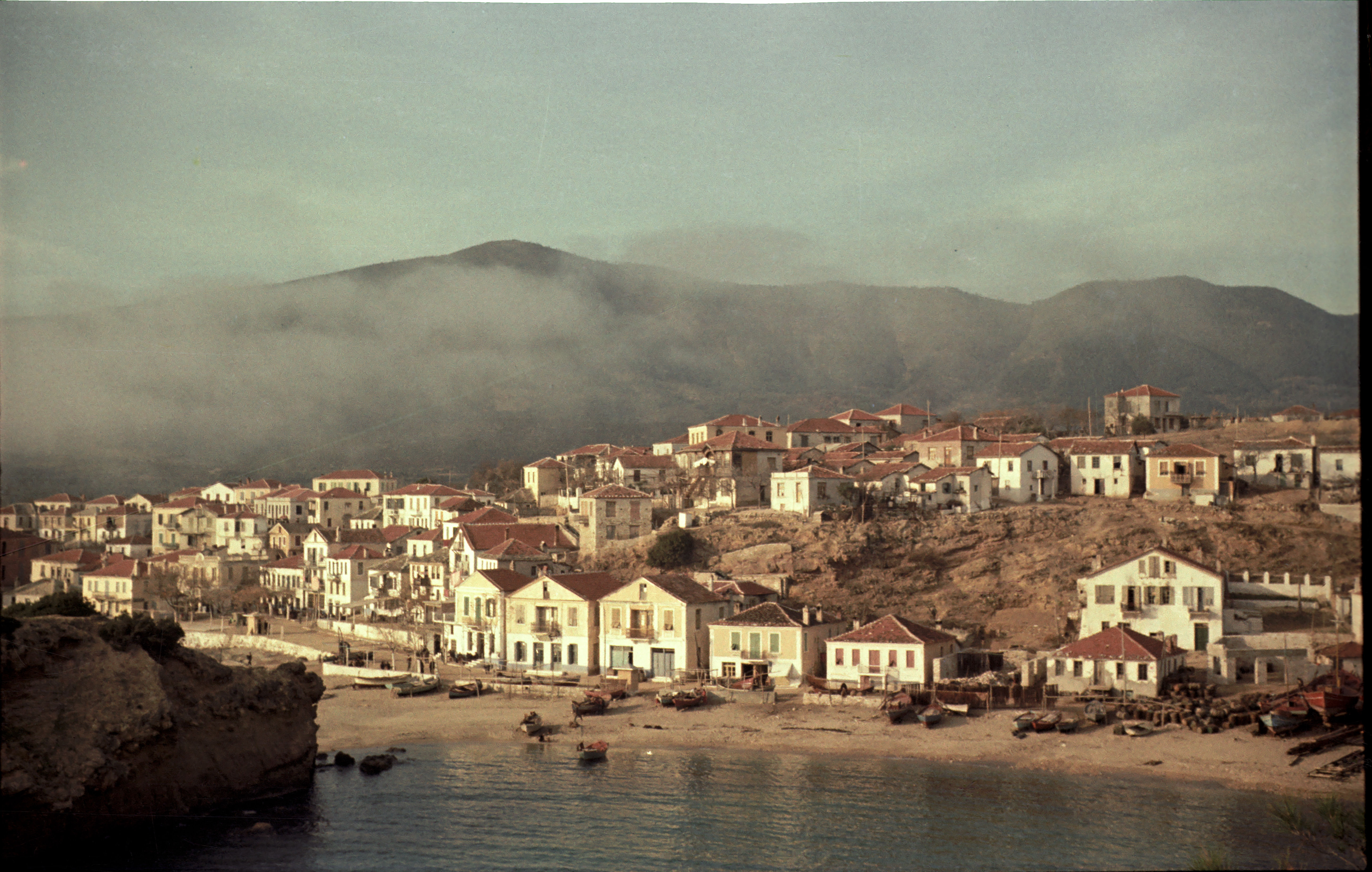
Limenaria in 1950s

During the Axis occupation (April 1941 – October 1944) Thasos, along with the region of East Macedonia and Thrace, was assigned by the Nazis to their Bulgarian allies. The Bulgarian government renamed the island "Tasos" and closed its schools. Thasos's mountainous terrain facilitated resistance activity, mainly led by the left-wing National Liberation Front (EAM). After the end of the war and the withdrawal of Axis troops in 1944, the island was caught up in the Greek Civil War. The leader of the communist naval faction, Sarantis Spintzos, was a native of Thasos. Skirmishes and communist guerilla attacks continued until 1950, almost a year after hostilities had ended on the Greek mainland.

In the post-war decades, another native of Thasos, Costas Tsimas, was to attain national recognition; a friend of Prime Minister Andreas Papandreou, he was appointed Director of the National Intelligence Service, the first civilian to hold that post. The island also became the epicenter of the 1987 Aegean Crisis.

Thasos, the capital, informally known as Limenas, or "the port", is served by a ferry route to and from Keramoti a port close to Kavala International Airport, and has the shortest possible crossing to the island. Scala Prinos 20 km south of Thassos town is served by a ferry route to and from Kavala.

== Administration ==
Thasos is a separate regional unit of the East Macedonia and Thrace region, and the only municipality of the regional unit. As a part of the 2011 Kallikratis government reform, the regional unit Thasos was created out of part of the former Kavala Prefecture. The municipality, unchanged at the Kallikratis reform, includes a few uninhabited islets besides the main island Thasos and has an area of 380.097 km^{2}. The province of Thasos (Greek: Επαρχία Θάσου) was one of the provinces of the Kavala Prefecture. It had the same territory as the present municipality. It was abolished in 2006.

== Geography ==
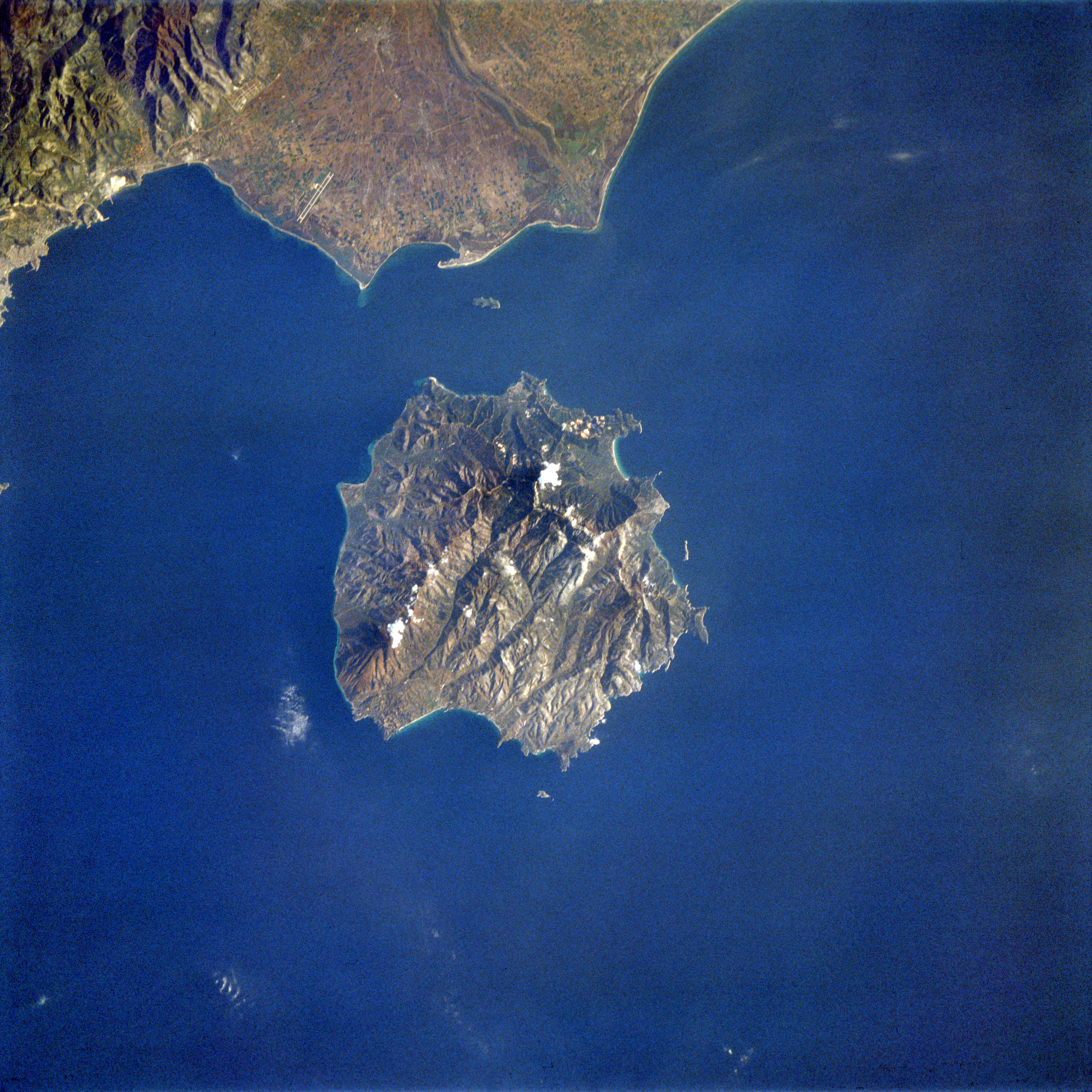
Thasos from space, April 1993

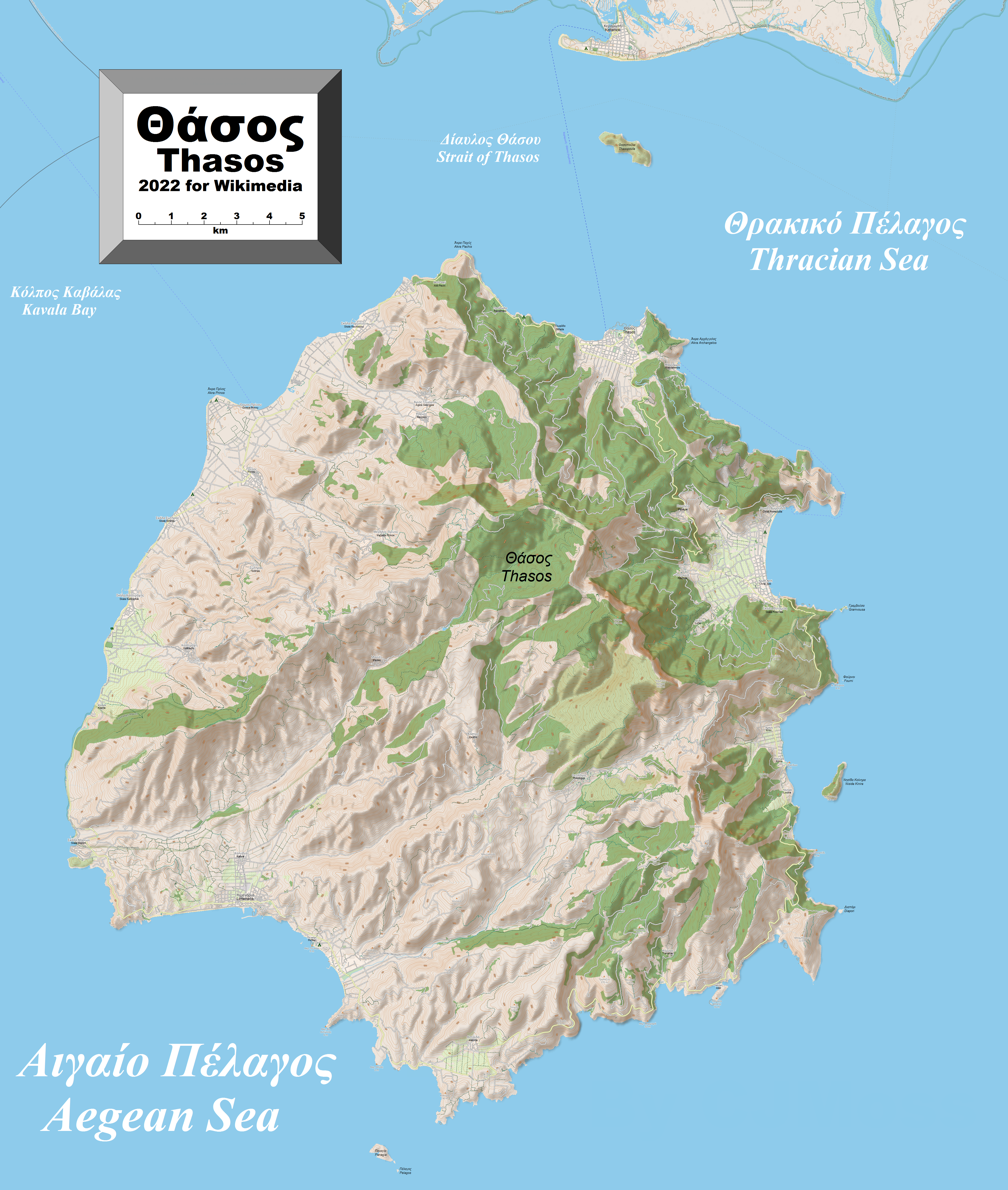
Detailed map of Thasos

Thasos is located in the northern Aegean sea approximately 7 km (4 mi) from the northern mainland and 20 kilometres (12 miles) south-east of Kavala. It is of generally round shape, without deep bays or significant peninsulas. The terrain is mountainous but not particularly rugged, rising gradually from coast to centre. The highest peak is Ypsario (Ipsario), at 1,205 metres (3,953 feet), somewhat east of centre. Pine forest covers much of the island's eastern slopes.

Historically, the island's population was chiefly engaged in agriculture and stockbreeding, and established villages inland, some of them connected via stairways (known as skalas) to harbors at the shore. The local population gradually migrated towards these shoreline settlements as tourism began to develop as an important source of income. Thus, there are several "paired villages" such as Maries–Skala Maries, with the former inland and the latter on the coast.

=== Geology ===
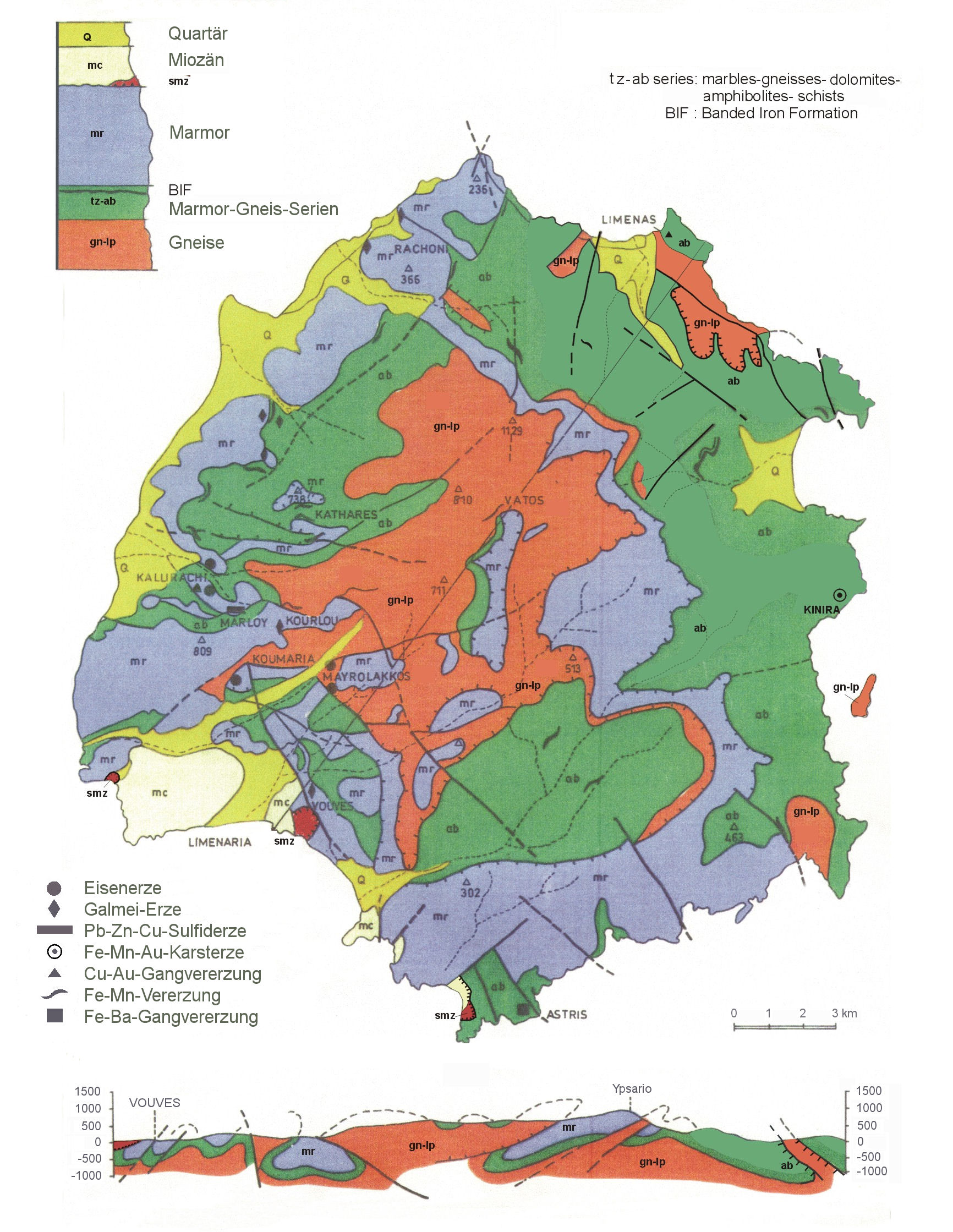
Geological and Metallogenic map of Thasos island.

The island is formed mainly by gneisses, schists and marbles of the Rhodope massif. Marble sequences corresponding to the Falakro marbles intercalated by schists and gneisses, are up to 500 m thick and are separated from the underlying gneisses by a transition zone about 300 m thick.

The rocks have undergone several periods of regional metamorphism, to at least upper amphibolite facies, and there was a subsequent phase of retrograde metamorphism. At least three periods of regional deformation have been identified, the most important being large scale isoclinal folding with axes aligned north-west. The T-zone is deformed and is interpreted by some authors as a regional thrust of pre-major folding age. There are two major high angle fault systems aligned north-west and north-east respectively. A large low-angle thrust cuts the gneiss, schist and marble sequence at the south-west corner of the island, probably indicating an overthrusting of the Serbomacedonian Massif onto the Rodope Massif.

The Late Miocene oil-producing Nestos-Prinos basin is located between Thassos island and the mainland. The floor of the basin is around 1,500 m deep off the Thassos coast (South Kavala ridge; Proedrou, 1988) and up to 4.000–5.000 m in the axial sector between Thassos and the mainland. The basin is filled with Late Miocene-Pliocene sediments, including ubiquitously repeated evaporite layers of rock salt and anhydrite-dolomite that alternate with sandstones, conglomerates, black shales, and uraniferous coal measures (Proedrou, 1979, 1988; Taupitz, 1985). Stratigraphically equivalent rocks on the mainland are clastic sediments with coal beds, marine to brackish fluvial units and travertines.

=== Mining history ===
The earliest mining on the island has been dated to around 13,000 BC, when Paleolithic miners dug a shaft at the site of the modern-era Tzines iron mine for the extraction of limonitic ochre. Mining for base and precious metals started around the 7th century BC with the Phoenicians, followed in the 4th century by the Greeks, then the Romans. These later mines were both open-cast and underground, mostly to exploit the island's numerous karst hosted calamine deposits for their lead and silver. Gold, copper and iron were also found; the Byzantines quarried marble on the island.

Friedrich Speidel, associated with the German jewelry company Speidel, obtained concessions to operate zinc-lead ore mines on Thasos in the early 1900s, and mining operations began around 1903. During this period, the company constructed a large administrative residence overlooking Limenaria, commonly known as Speidel Castle, sometimes referred to locally as the Palataki ("little palace"). Built in the early twentieth century and designed by Italian architect Pietro Arigoni, the building served as the headquarters of the Speidel mining operations on the island. The building still stands today above the harbor of Limenaria and remains largely abandoned, serving as a visible reminder of the island's early twentieth-century wealthy mining industry. At the outbreak of the Second World War, the Speidel mining operations were halted, leading to the closure of the enterprise and a temporary end to mining activity on the island. Iron ore mining later resumed on a significant scale between 1954 and 1964, producing approximately 3 million tonnes. Since 1964, geological surveys have confirmed the presence of a deep-level zinc–lead deposit; however, the only mining activity on the island in recent decades has been marble quarrying.

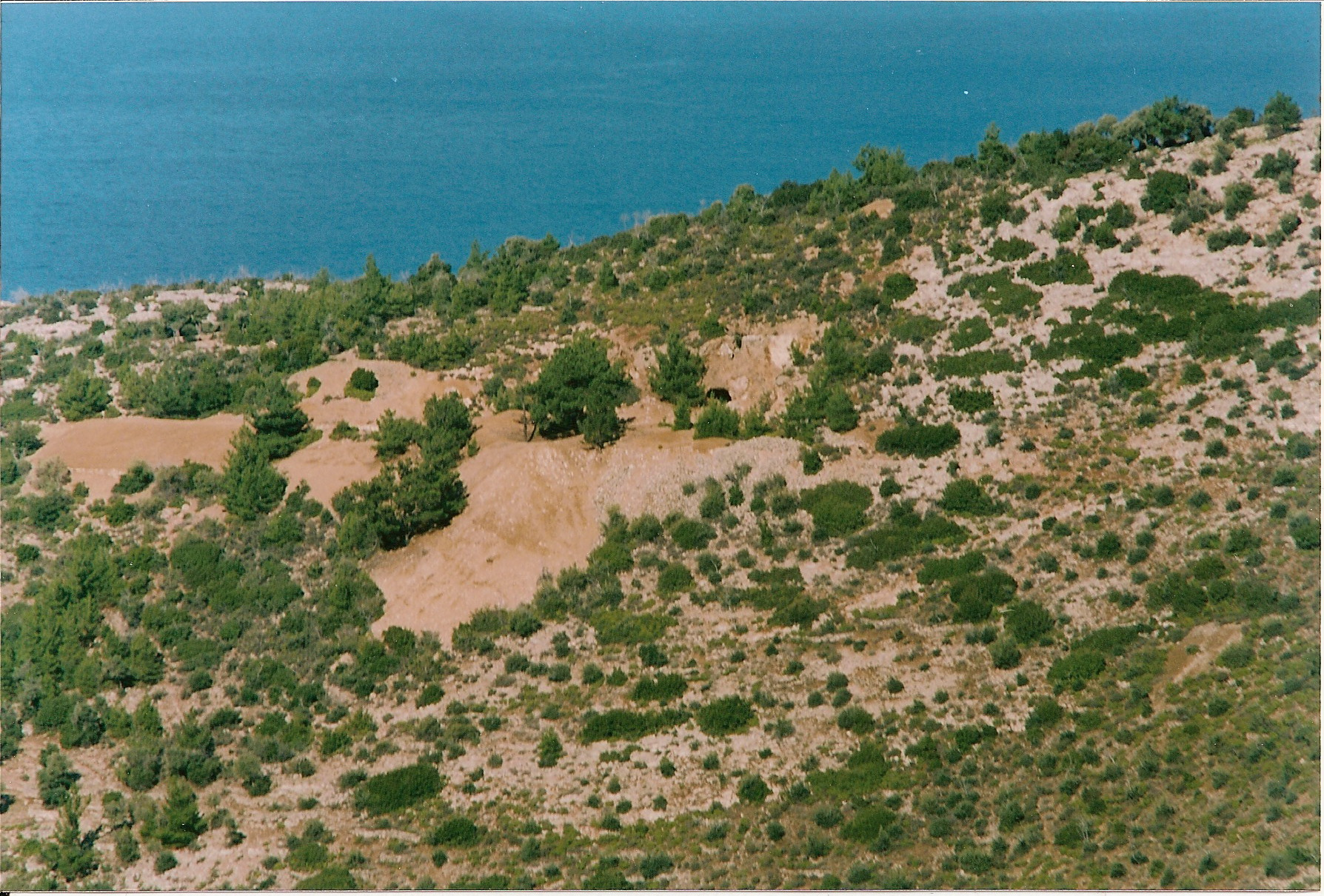
Lead-zinc mine at Sellada

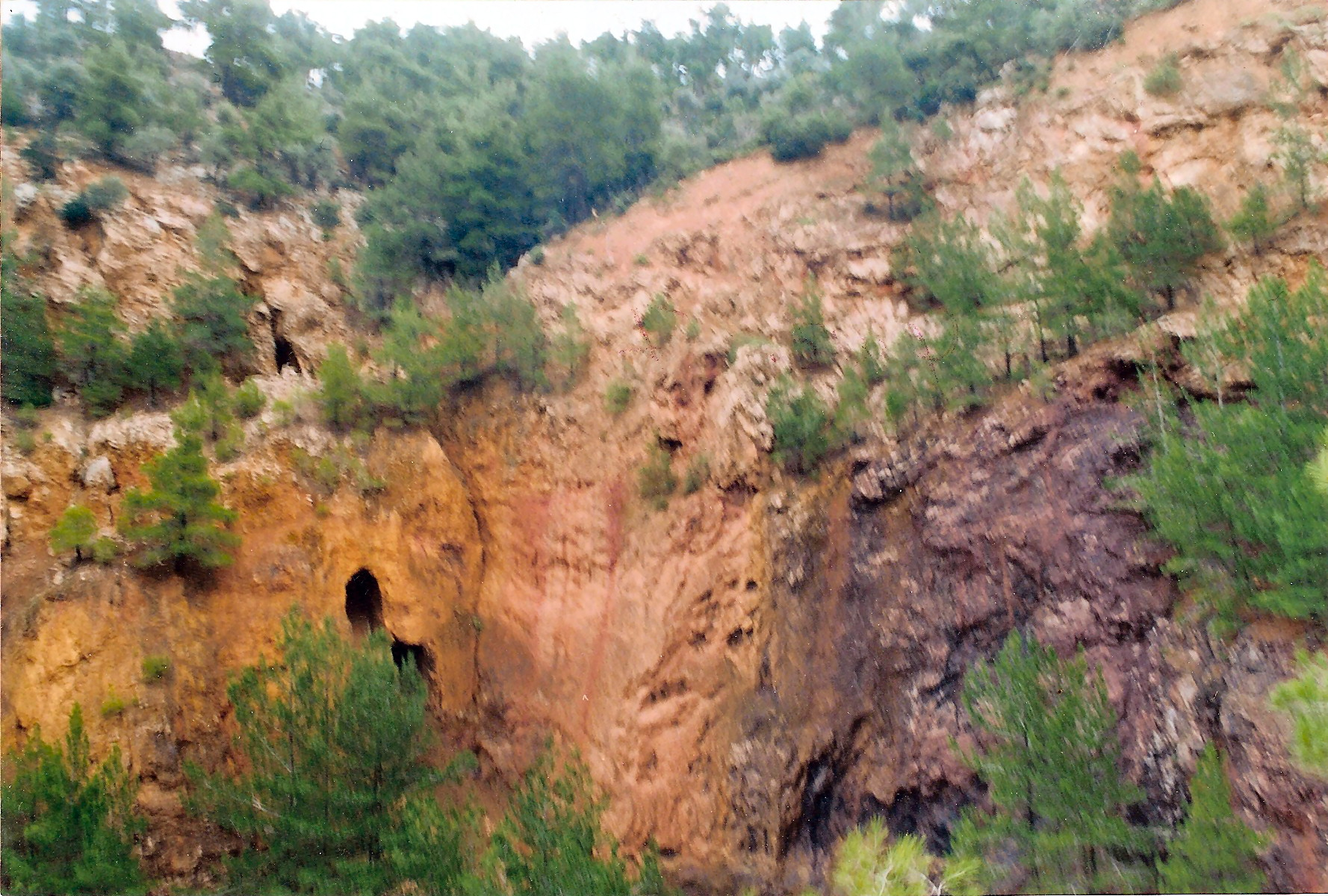
Iron mine of Koupanada

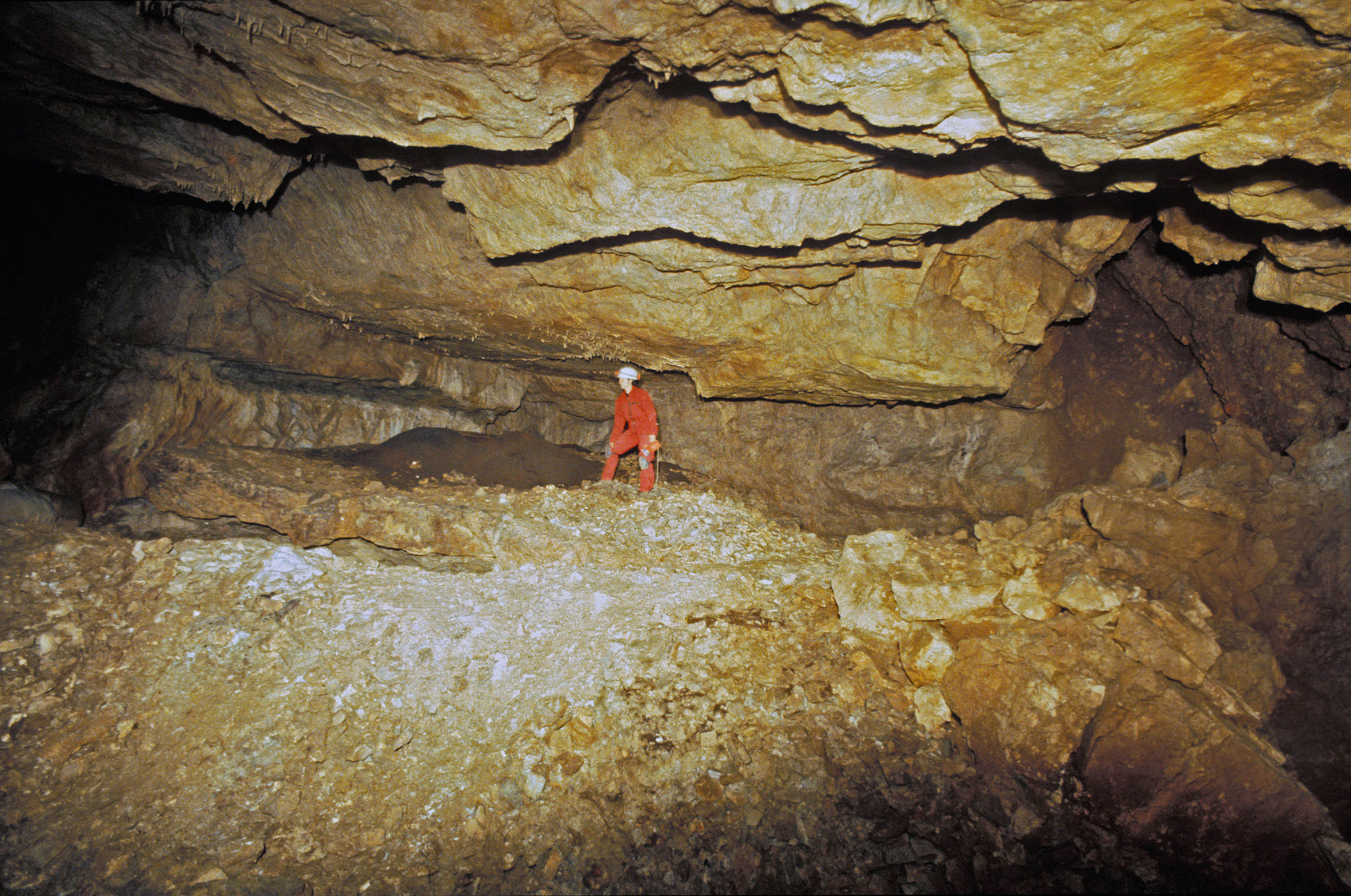
Gold mine

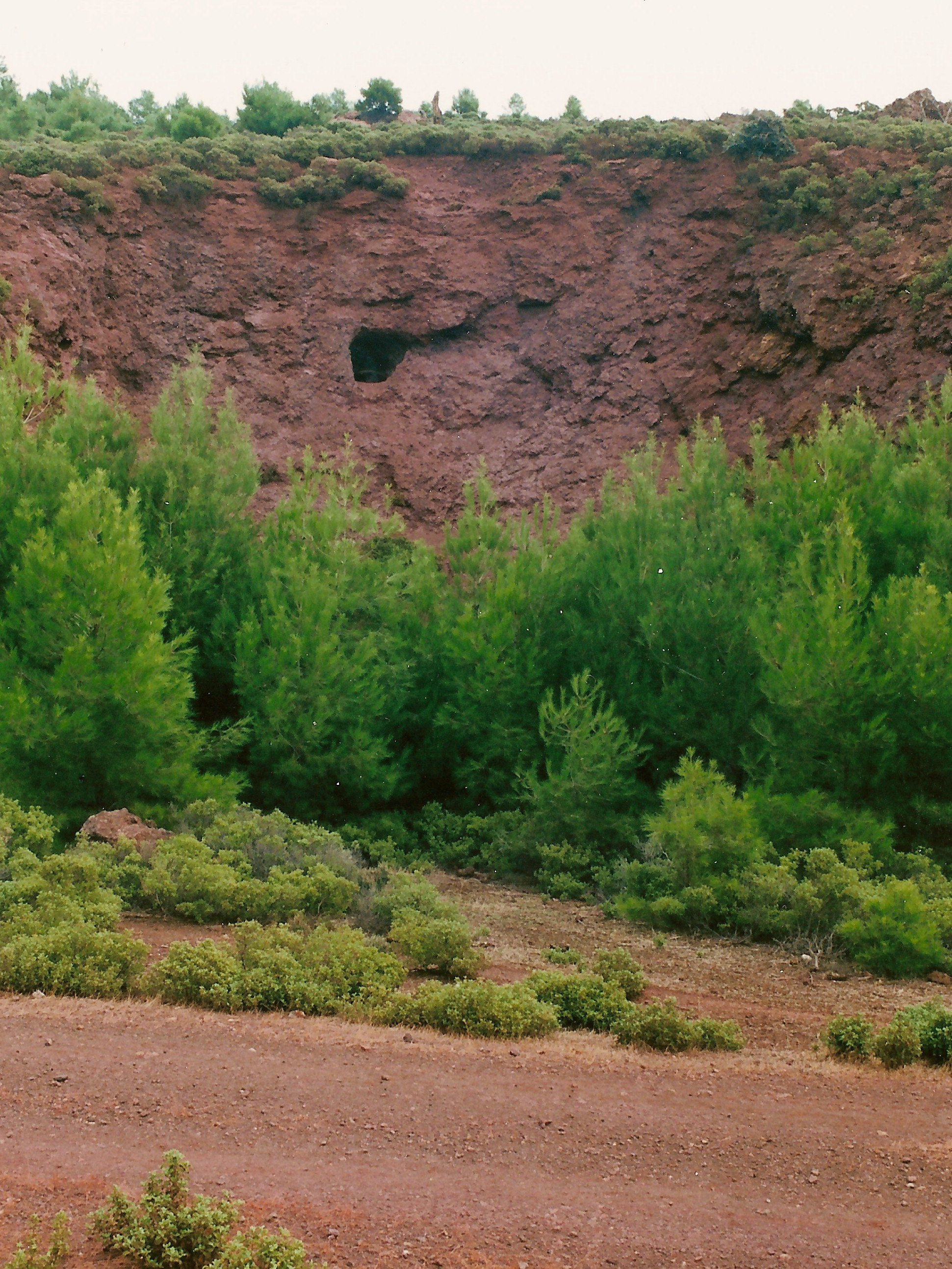
Iron mine at Tzines, with Paleolithic mine-tunnel

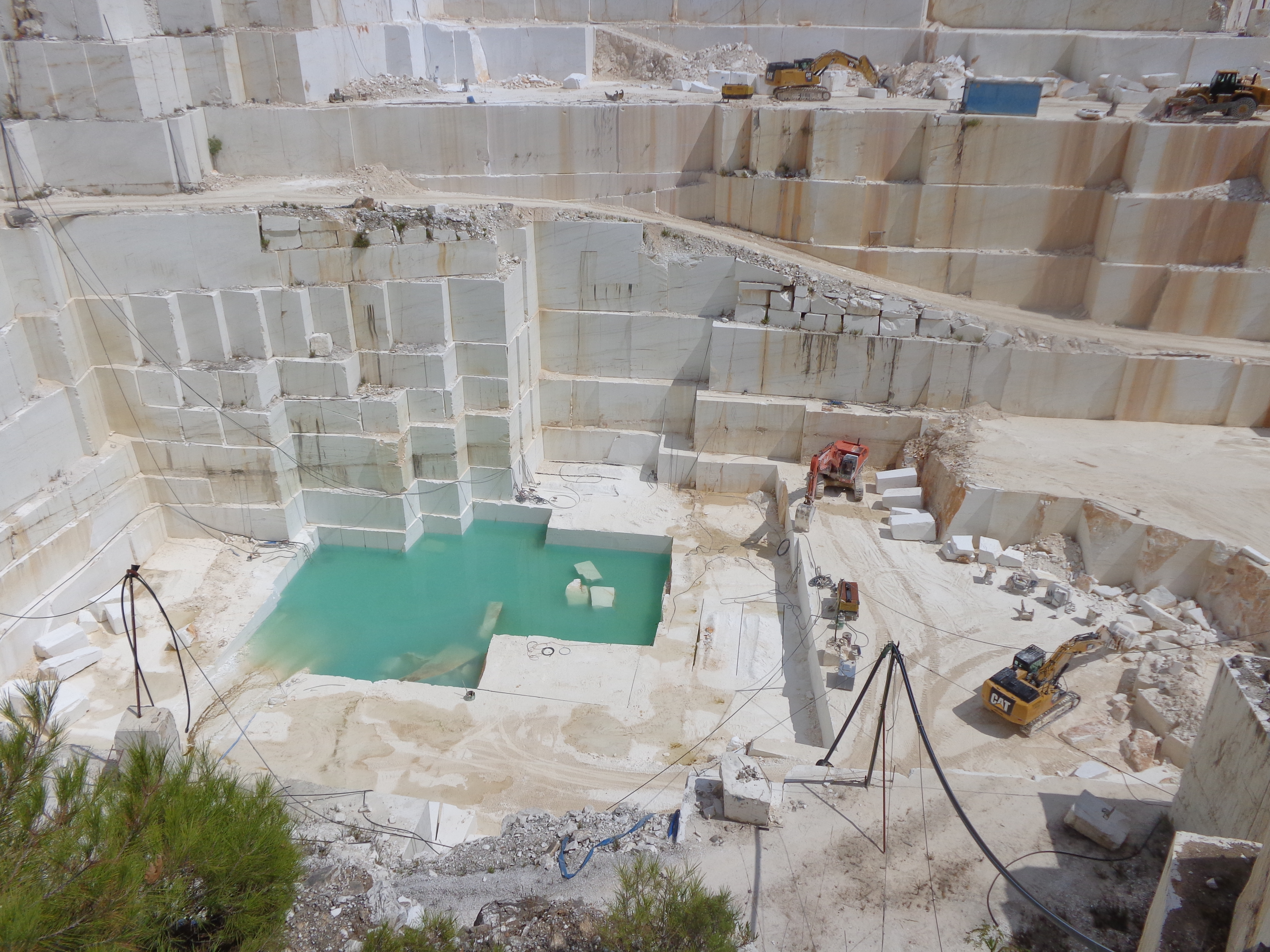
Marble quarry of Alyki

== Climate ==
Thasos has a hot-summer Mediterranean climate (Csa in the Köppen climate classification) with mild winters and hot summers.

Climate data for Thasos
Month	Jan	Feb	Mar	Apr	May	Jun	Jul	Aug	Sep	Oct	Nov	Dec	Year
Record high °C (°F)	19.8 (67.6)	20.4 (68.7)	23.6 (74.5)	27.3 (81.1)	30.9 (87.6)	35.7 (96.3)	37.2 (99.0)	39.0 (102.2)	36.1 (97.0)	30.0 (86.0)	25.3 (77.5)	20.9 (69.6)	39.0 (102.2)
Mean daily maximum °C (°F)	10.5 (50.9)	12.2 (54.0)	14.3 (57.7)	18.5 (65.3)	23.7 (74.7)	28.3 (82.9)	31.2 (88.2)	32.1 (89.8)	27.1 (80.8)	20.9 (69.6)	16.6 (61.9)	12.5 (54.5)	20.7 (69.2)
Daily mean °C (°F)	7.3 (45.1)	8.8 (47.8)	10.7 (51.3)	14.2 (57.6)	19.2 (66.6)	23.7 (74.7)	26.4 (79.5)	27.3 (81.1)	22.8 (73.0)	17.2 (63.0)	13.4 (56.1)	9.5 (49.1)	16.7 (62.1)
Mean daily minimum °C (°F)	4.1 (39.4)	5.3 (41.5)	7.0 (44.6)	9.9 (49.8)	14.7 (58.5)	19.1 (66.4)	21.6 (70.9)	22.4 (72.3)	18.4 (65.1)	13.4 (56.1)	10.2 (50.4)	6.4 (43.5)	12.7 (54.9)
Record low °C (°F)	−4.8 (23.4)	−3.8 (25.2)	−2.6 (27.3)	2.3 (36.1)	8.9 (48.0)	11.4 (52.5)	16.3 (61.3)	17.8 (64.0)	9.3 (48.7)	6.6 (43.9)	1.2 (34.2)	−3.3 (26.1)	−4.8 (23.4)
Average rainfall mm (inches)	112.3 (4.42)	55.7 (2.19)	74.1 (2.92)	48.7 (1.92)	41.2 (1.62)	57.5 (2.26)	17.5 (0.69)	15.6 (0.61)	30.0 (1.18)	71.2 (2.80)	128.5 (5.06)	142.3 (5.60)	794.6 (31.27)
Source 1: National Observatory of Athens Monthly Bulletins (Dec 2014 - Sep 2023)
Source 2: Thasos N.O.A station and World Meteorological Organization

== Transport ==
There are two main roads in Thasos: Greek National Road 69; and Kavala Provincial Road 17, created in 1956 while the island was part of the Kavala Prefecture.

== Economy ==
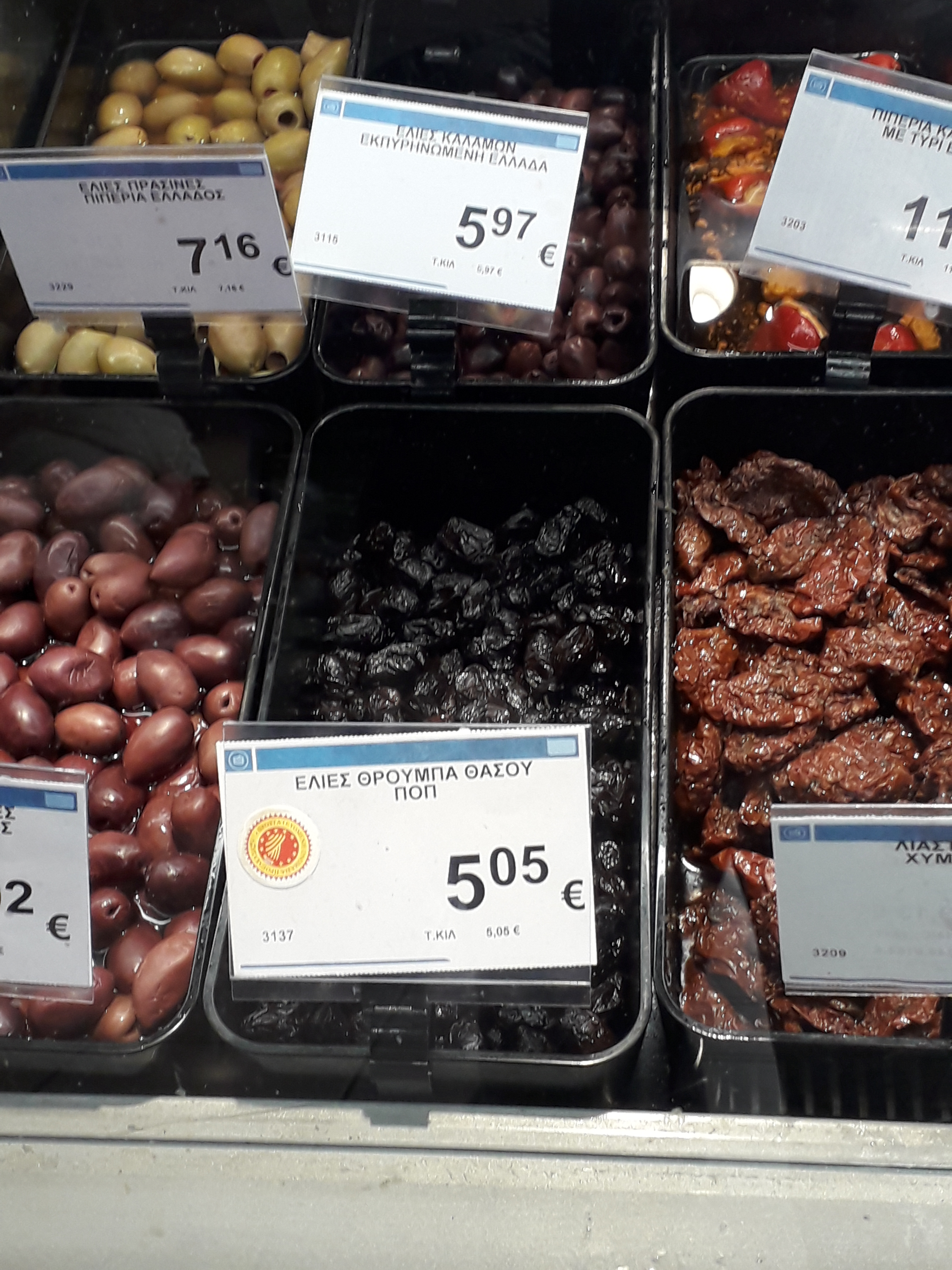
Throumba olives on sale at a supermarket

By far the most important economic activity is tourism. The main agricultural products on the island are honey, almonds, walnuts, olives (such as the local Throumba variety which has a protected designation of origin), olive oil, and wine. The inhabitants also engage in the herding of sheep and goats, and fishing. Other industries are lumber and mining which includes lead, zinc, and marble, especially in the Panagia area where one of the mountains near the Thracian Sea has a large marble quarry. The marble quarries in the south (in the area of Aliki), now abandoned, were mined during ancient times.

== Localities ==
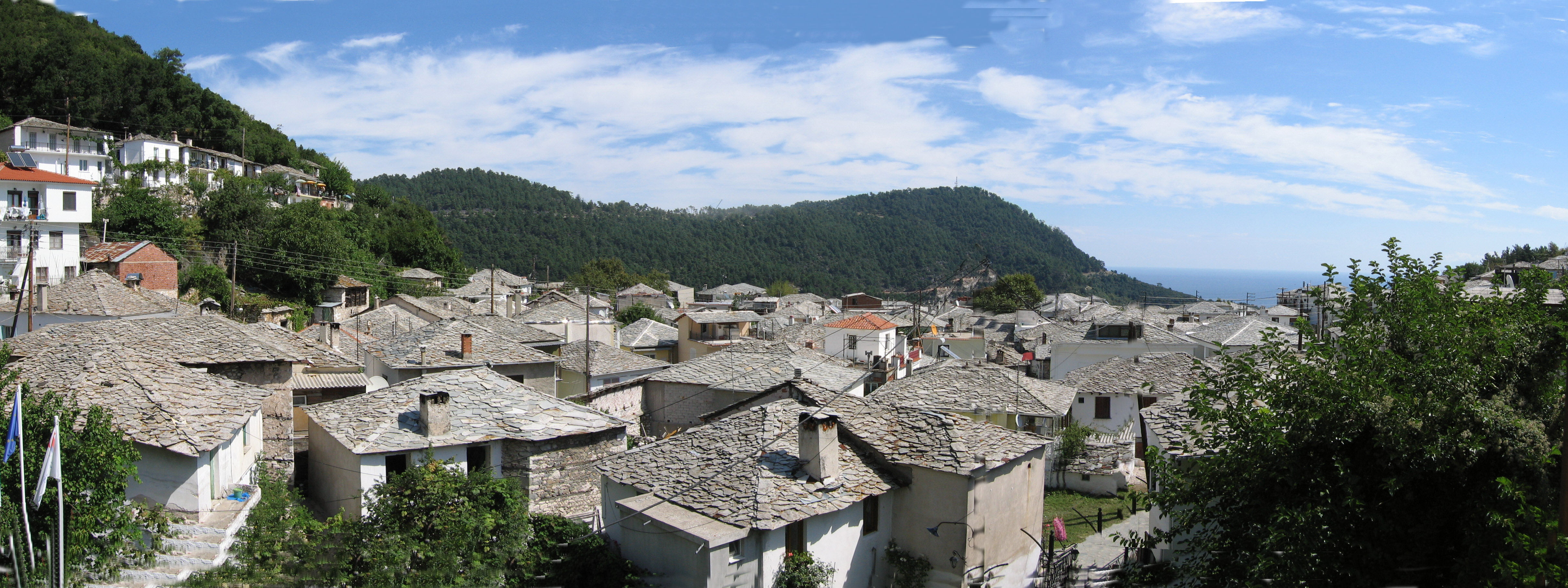
Panagia village

Towns and villages with over 100 inhabitants (2021 census) are:

- Kallirachi (417)
- Limenaria (2,351)
- Panagia (672)
- Potamia (1,274)
- Potos (788)
- Prinos (1,160)
- Rachoni (408)
- Skala Kallirachis (554)
- Skala Marion (367)
- Skala Rachoniou (219)
- Skala Sotiros (360)
- Thasos (Limenas Thasou) (3,331)
- Theologos (515)

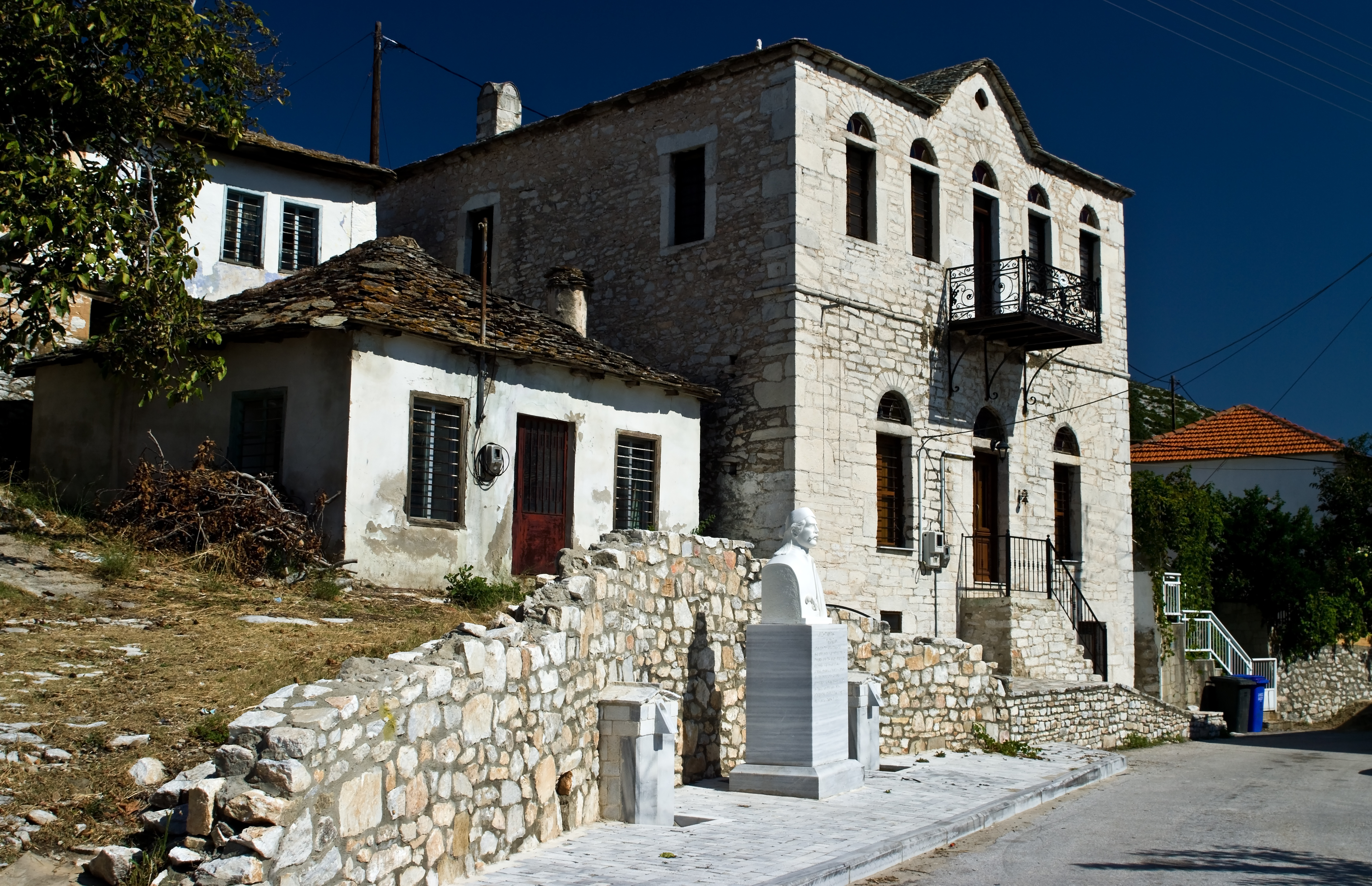
Traditional village of Theologos

== Historical population ==
Year	Town	Municipality
1981	2,312	–
1991	2,600	–
2001	3,140	13,765
2011	3,240	13,770
2021	3,331	13,104

== Sights ==
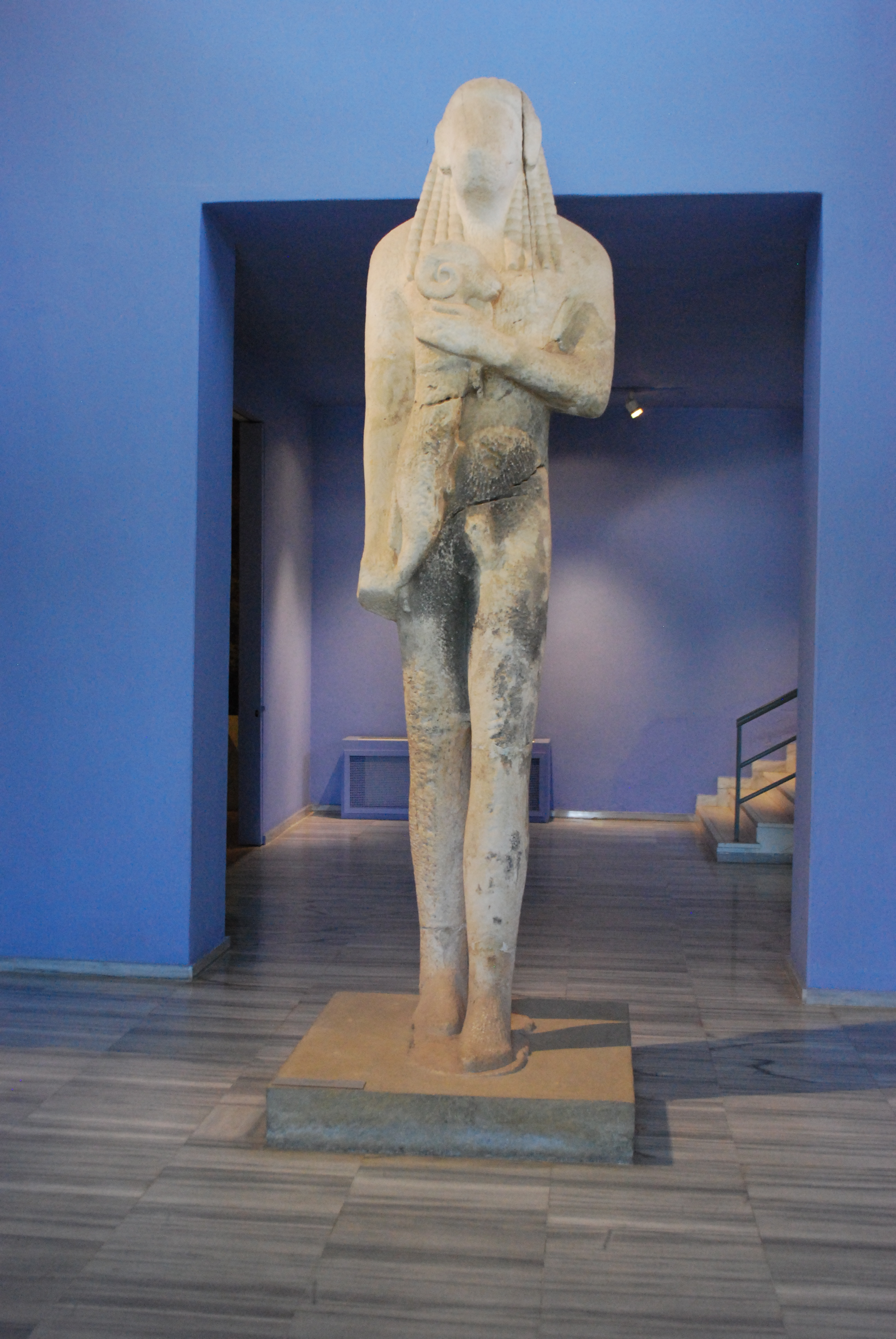
Kouros at the Archaeological Museum of Thasos

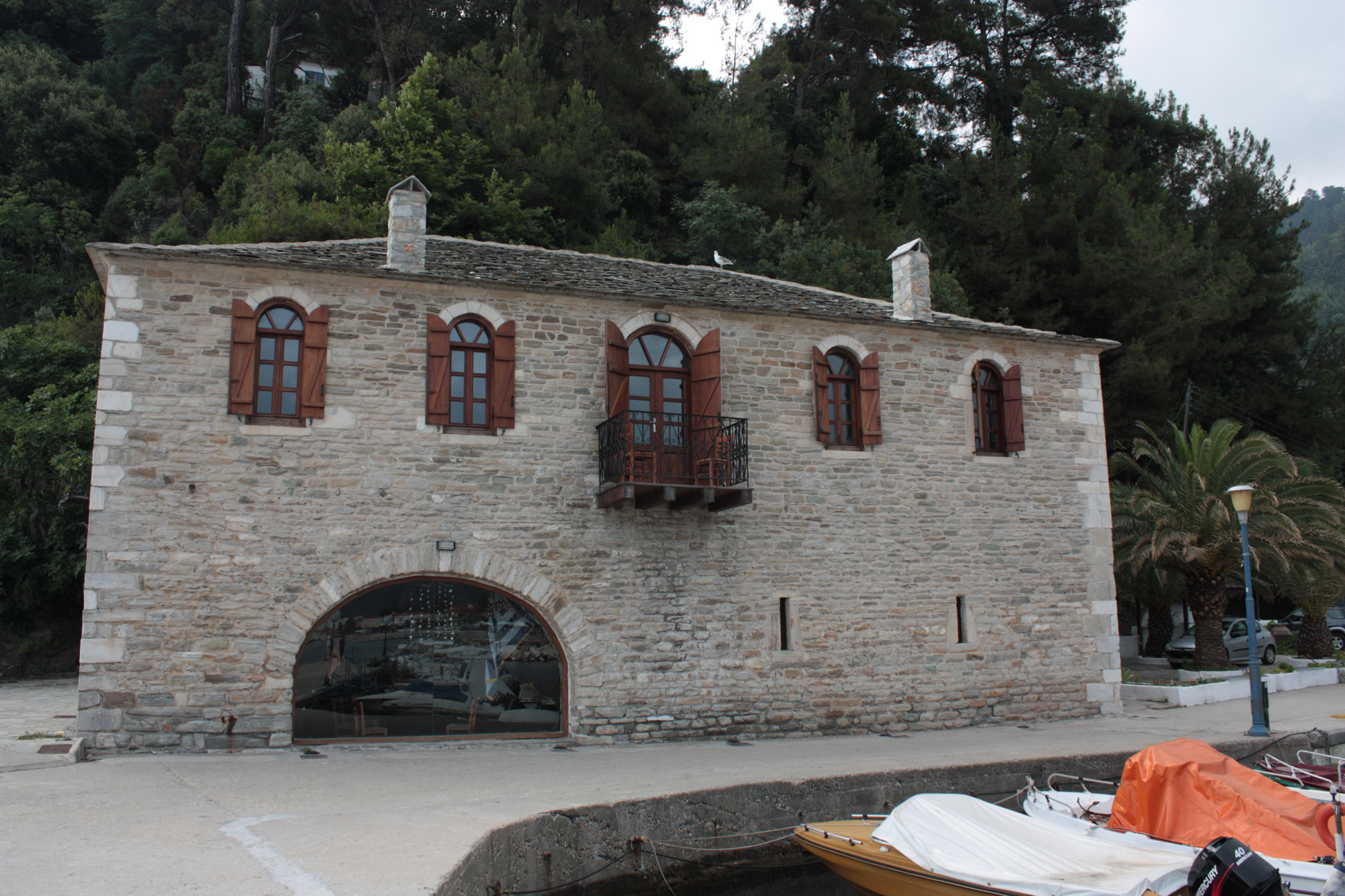
Polygnotos Vagis Municipal Museum in Potamia

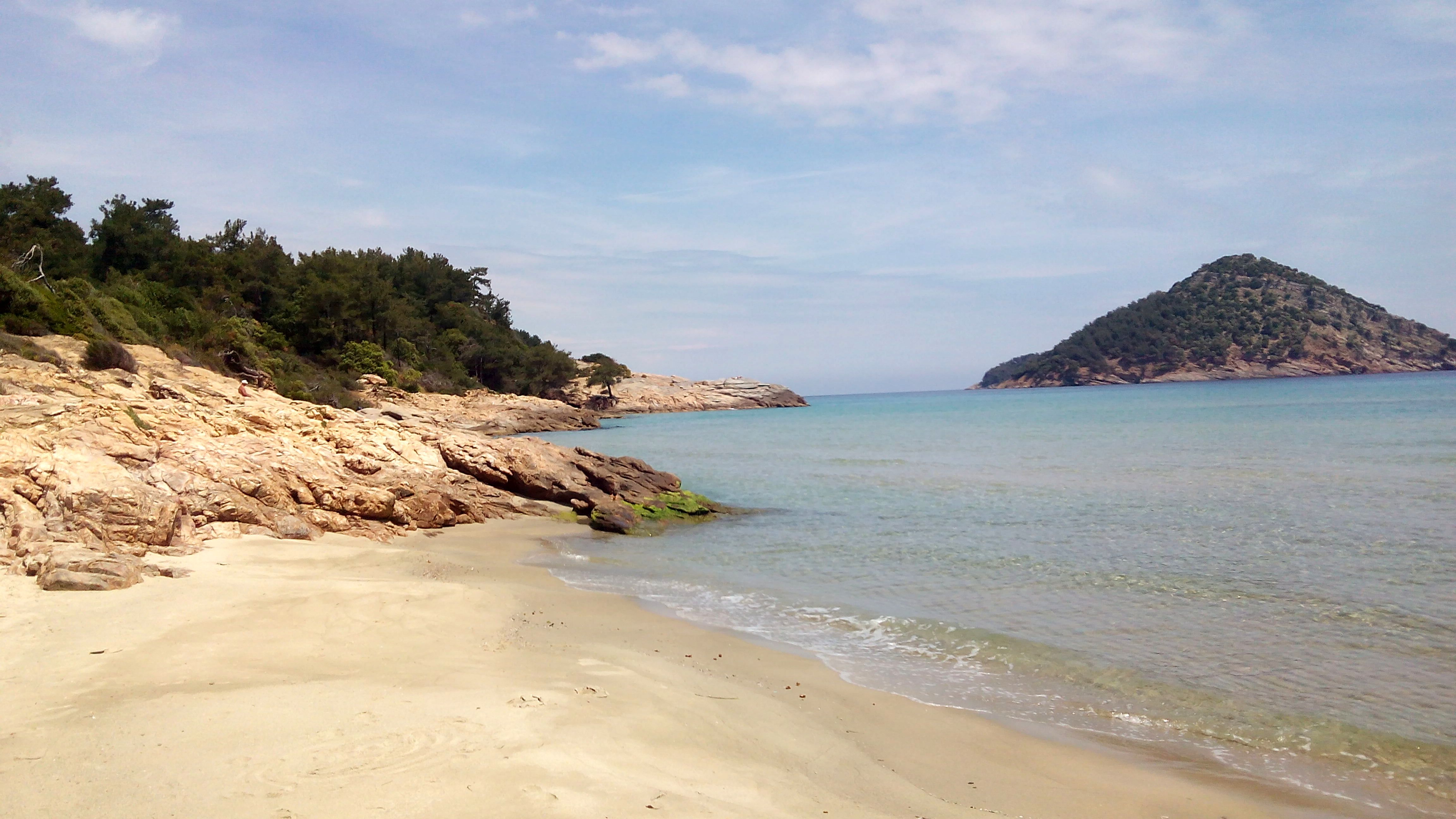
Paradisos beach

- Archaeological Museum of Thasos, which houses the 3.5-meter-high Kouros of Thasos (Kryophoros)
- The nearby ancient agora in Thasos town
- Acropolis of Thasos and ancient theater near Thasos town
- Polygnotos Vagis Municipal Museum in Potamia
- Folklore Museum of Limenaria
- Archangel Michael's Monastery
- Saint Panteleimon Monastery: it was built in 1843 and became monastery in 1987. According to inhabitants of Thassos, someone wanted to build it in favor of Saint Panteleimon. The workers started the building at a location, but the next day when they wanted to continue with the construction, the part they had built was found destroyed and their tools were missing. The same happened on the following days. One day they saw footprints on the ground and followed them until they found their tools nearby a natural spring. Finally, they built the monastery at that spot.
- Monastery of the Assumption
- Gate of Silenus, built around 500 BC
- Kastro: its foundation year is unknown. This village must have been created during the years of Frankish domination.
- Krambousa Isle: it can be found across the coast of Skala Potamia. The thick vegetation makes it impossible to explore all parts of it. It is full with a special wild vegetable called "Krambi". The little church of Saint Daniel is located at the top of the hill. The inhabitants visit this church on the day of the saint every year.
- Mount Ypsario (Ipsario) 1,203 meters (3,947 ft)
- Artificial Lake in Maries

== Notable people ==
- Archilochos (7th century BC), warrior and poet
- Aglaophon (6th–5th century BC), painter, teacher and father of Polygnotus and Aristophon
- Hegemon of Thasos, comedian, inventor of parody
- Leodamas (4th century BC), mathematician
- Neseus of Thasos, painter
- Polygnotos Vagis (1892–1965), Thasos-born US sculptor
- Polygnotus (mid-5th century BC), painter
- Stesimbrotos (c. 470 – c. 420 BC), sophist
- Theagenes of Thasos (480 BC), Olympic boxer
- Pankratiast (476 BC), Olympic runner
- Androsthenes of Thasos (4th century BC), admiral serving under Alexander the Great
- Vassilis Vassilikos (1933–2023), poet and author, born in Thasos. His novel "Z" was the source for the eponymous Academy Award-winning film.
