= Ypsario =

Mountain in Greece

- Ypsarion
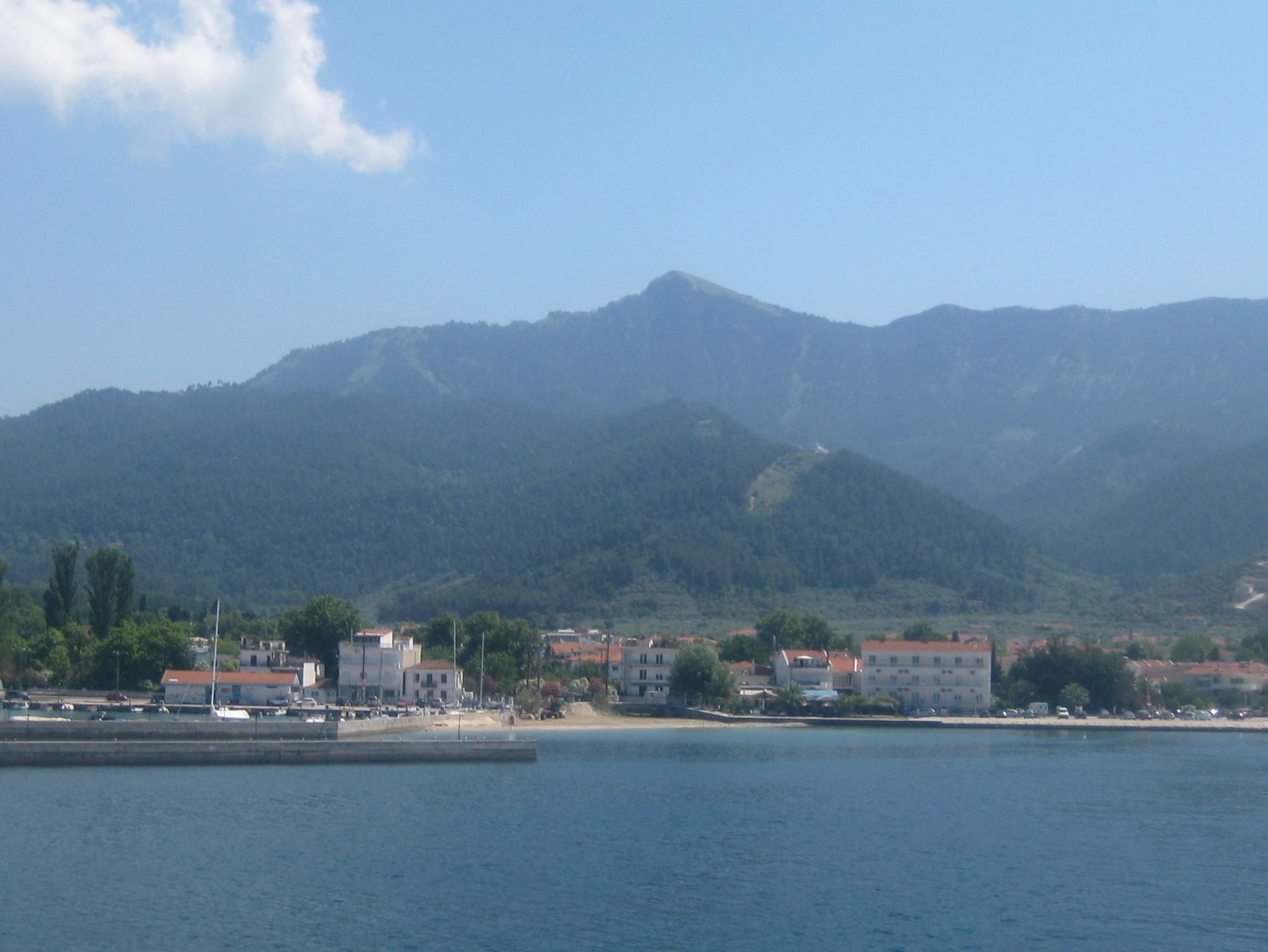

Highest point
- Elevation: 1,204 m (3,950 ft)
- Prominence: 1,204 m (3,950 ft)
- Listing: Ribu
- Coordinates: 40.703262°N 24.705225°E

Geography
- Location: Thasos
- Country: Greece

Ypsario (Greek: Υψάριο) or Ypsarion (also Ipsarion or Ipsario) is a mountain in Thasos island, Greece. At 1204 metres, it is the highest point of the island. It is most commonly reached by hikers via the village of Potamia, although it can also be reached from Theologos.
