= Potamia, Thasos =

Potamia Ποταμιά
- Community
- Location within Greece
- Coordinates: 40°43′01″N 24°43′44″E
- Country: Greece
- Administrative region: Eastern Macedonia and Thrace
- Regional unit: Thasos
- Municipality: Thasos

Population (2021)
  - Community: 1,274
- Time zone: UTC+2 (EET)
  - Summer (DST): UTC+3 (EEST)

Potamia (Greek: Ποταμιά) is a village on the island of Thasos, Greece. It is built in the valley at the foot of Mount Ipsario, and surrounded to the south and east by pine and sweet chestnut forests. Its coastal annexe is the holiday resort of Skala Potamias. Potamia was the birthplace of the Greek-born American sculptor Polygnotos Vagis, and a museum dedicated to his work exists in the village. Etymologically, the name of the village is derived from the streams that run through it.

== Gallery ==
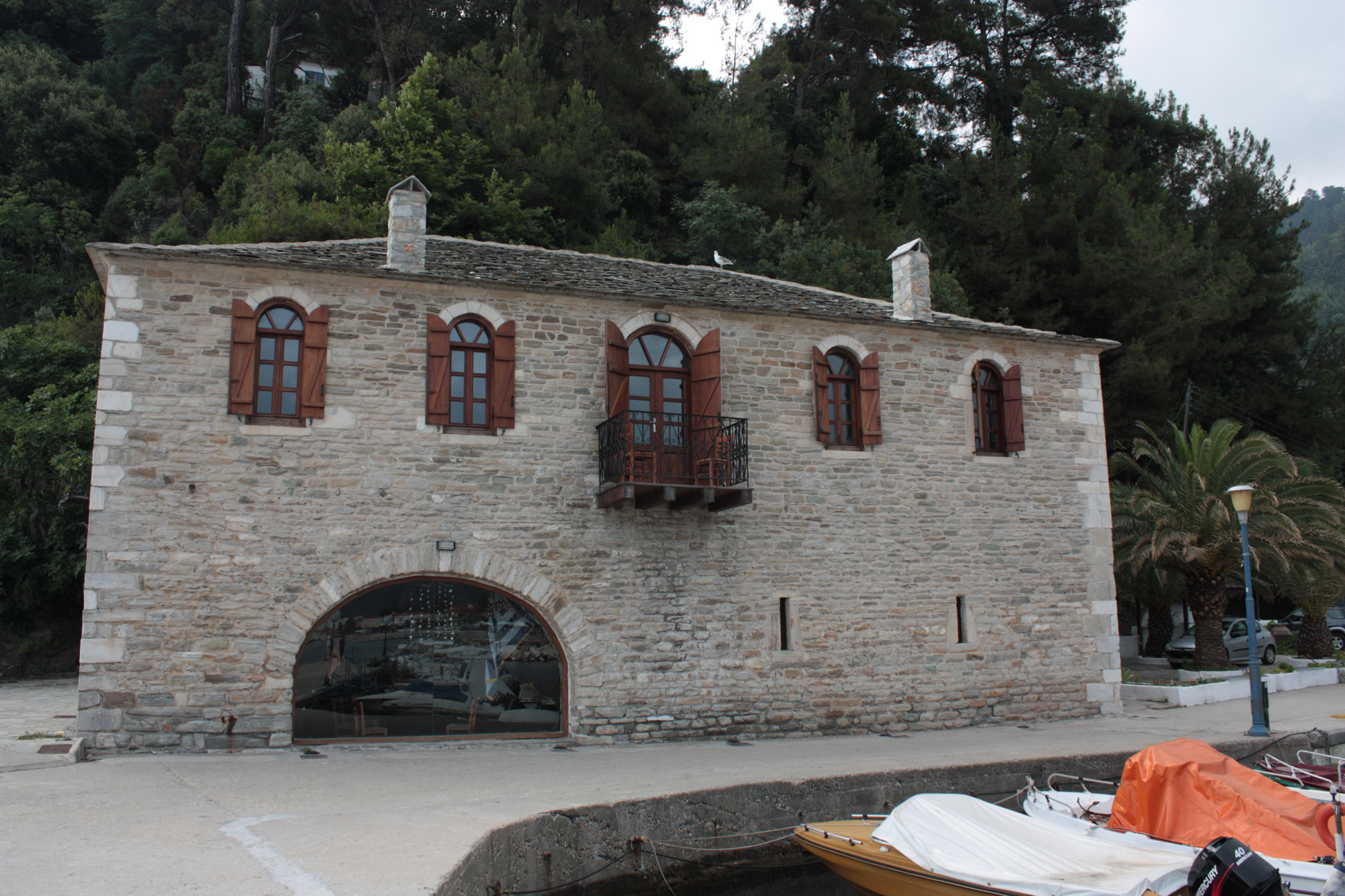
Polygnotos Vagis Municipal Museum in Potamia

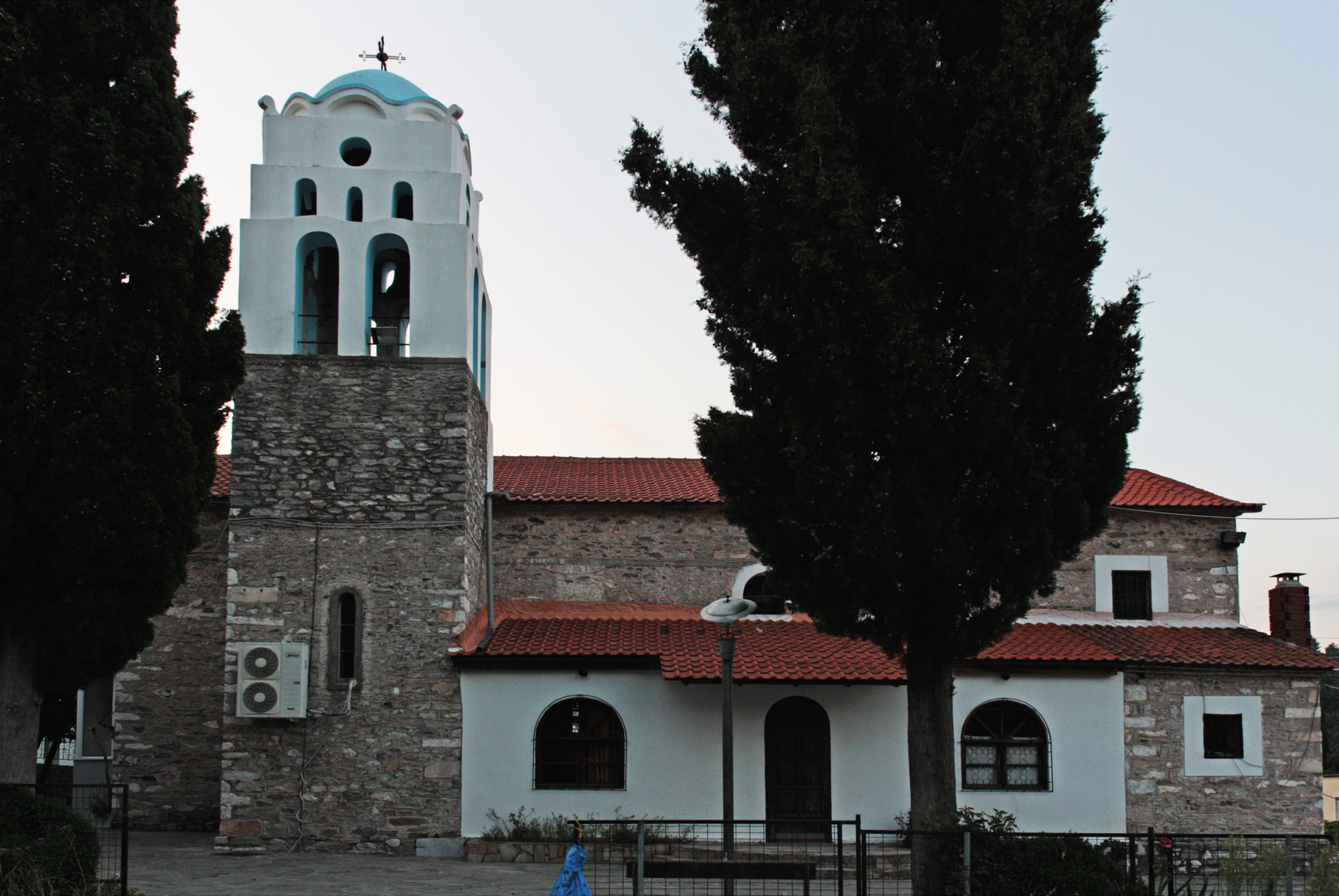
Saint Haralambos church in Potamia

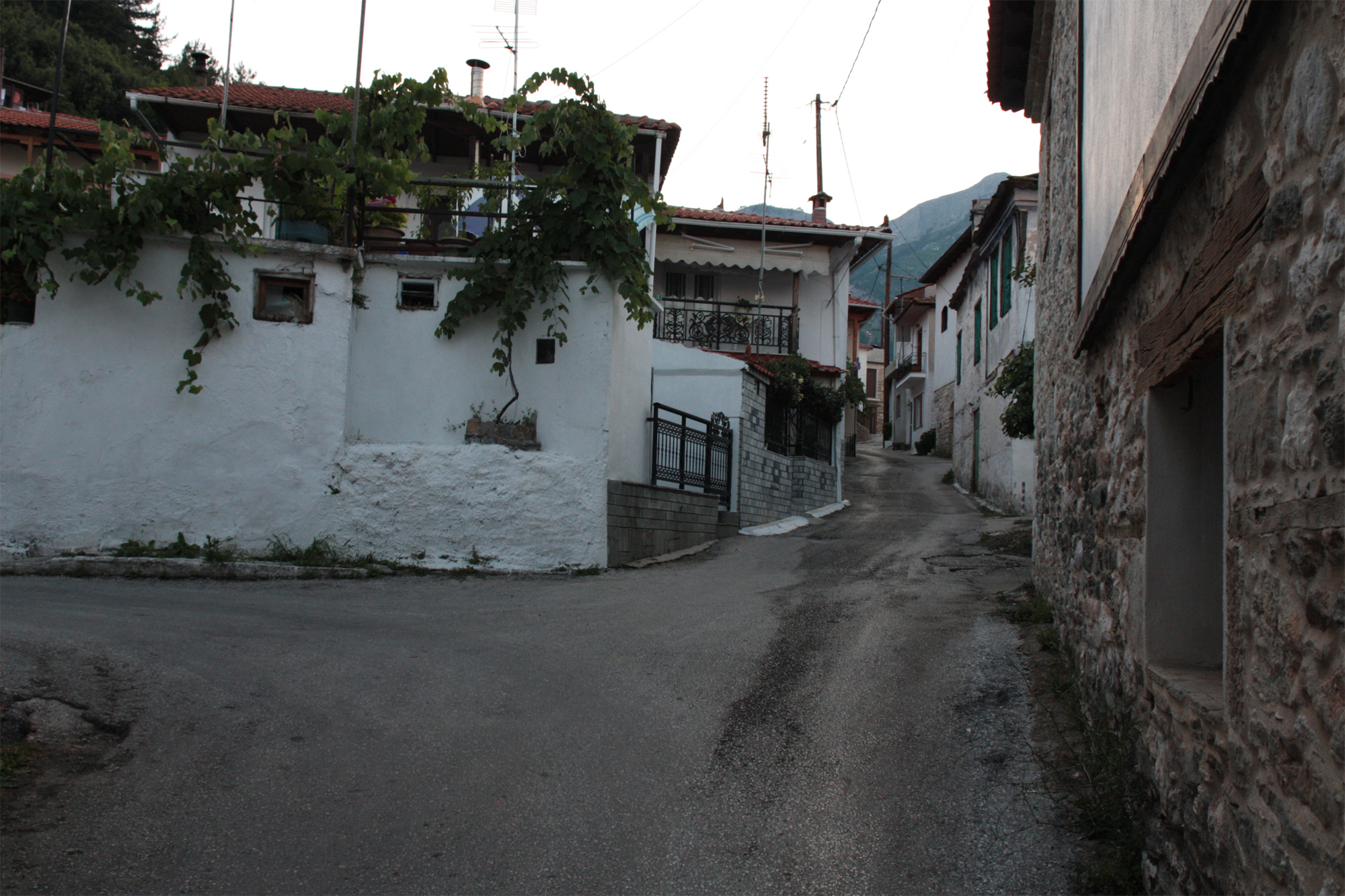
Old street in Potamia

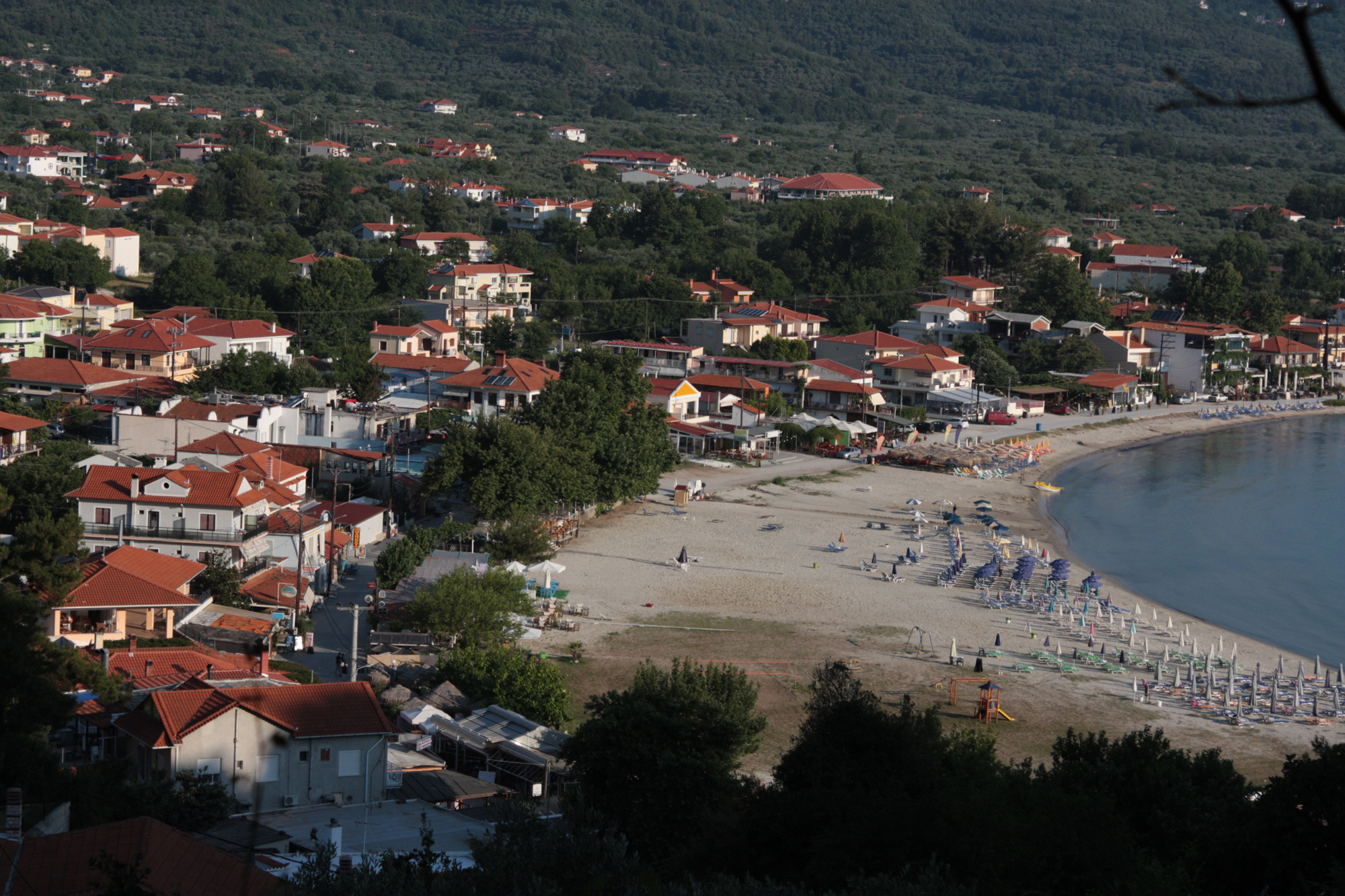
Skala Potamias

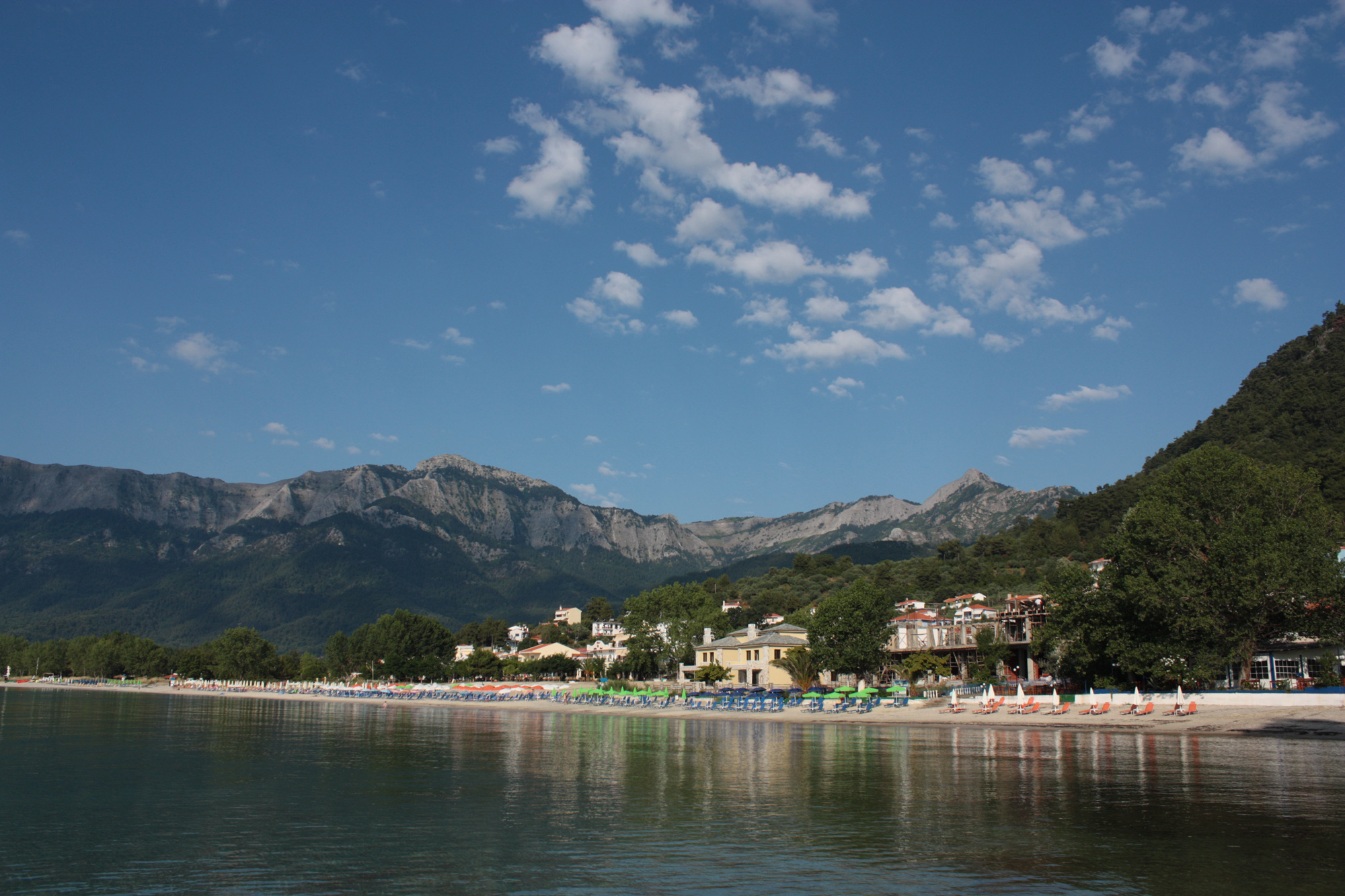
The Golden Beach near Potamia
