= Verd antique =

Type of green marble

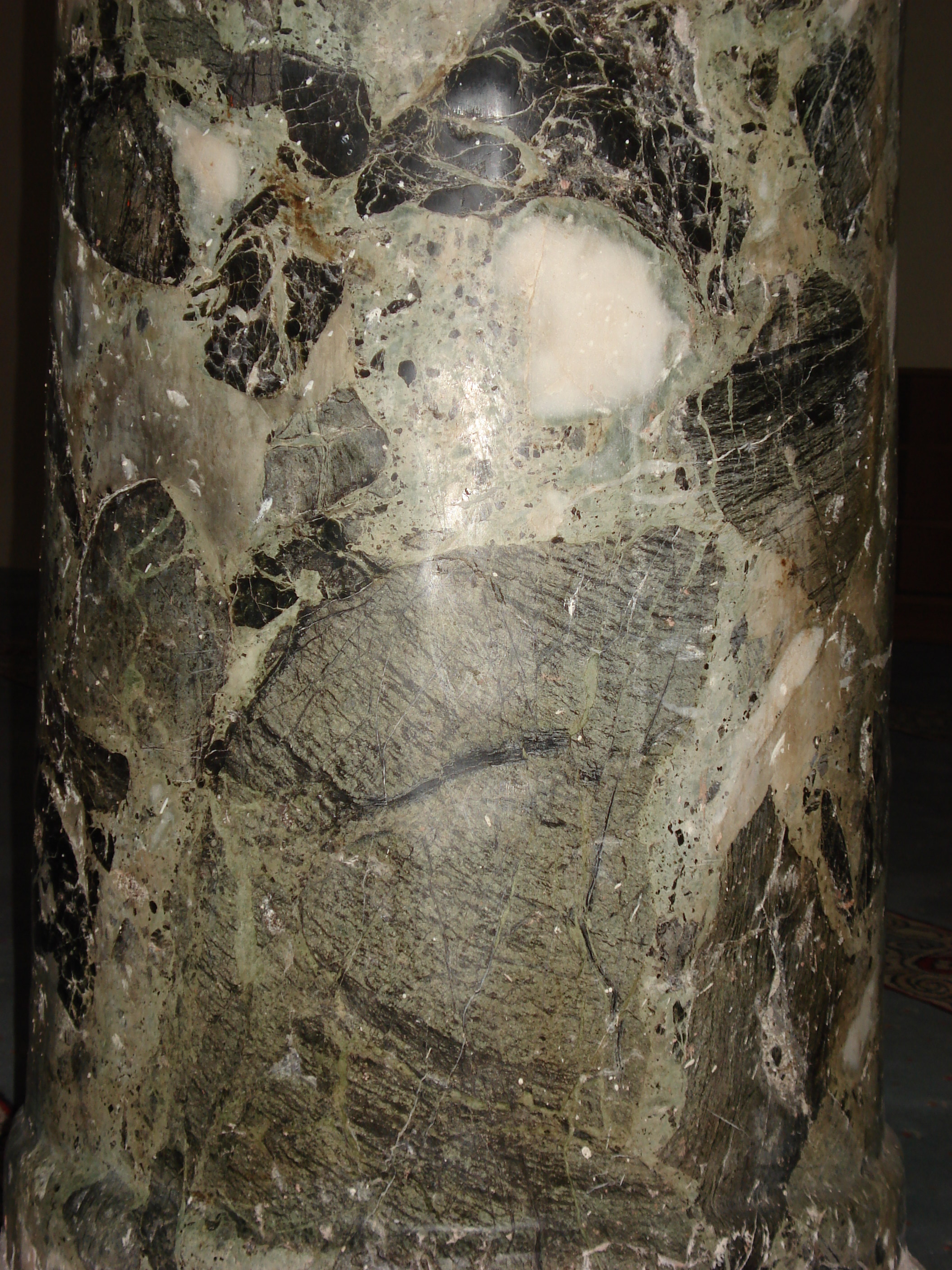
Verd antique column in the Church of Saints Sergius and Bacchus (now the Küçuk Ayasofya Camii) in Istanbul, Turkey (527-536 CE).

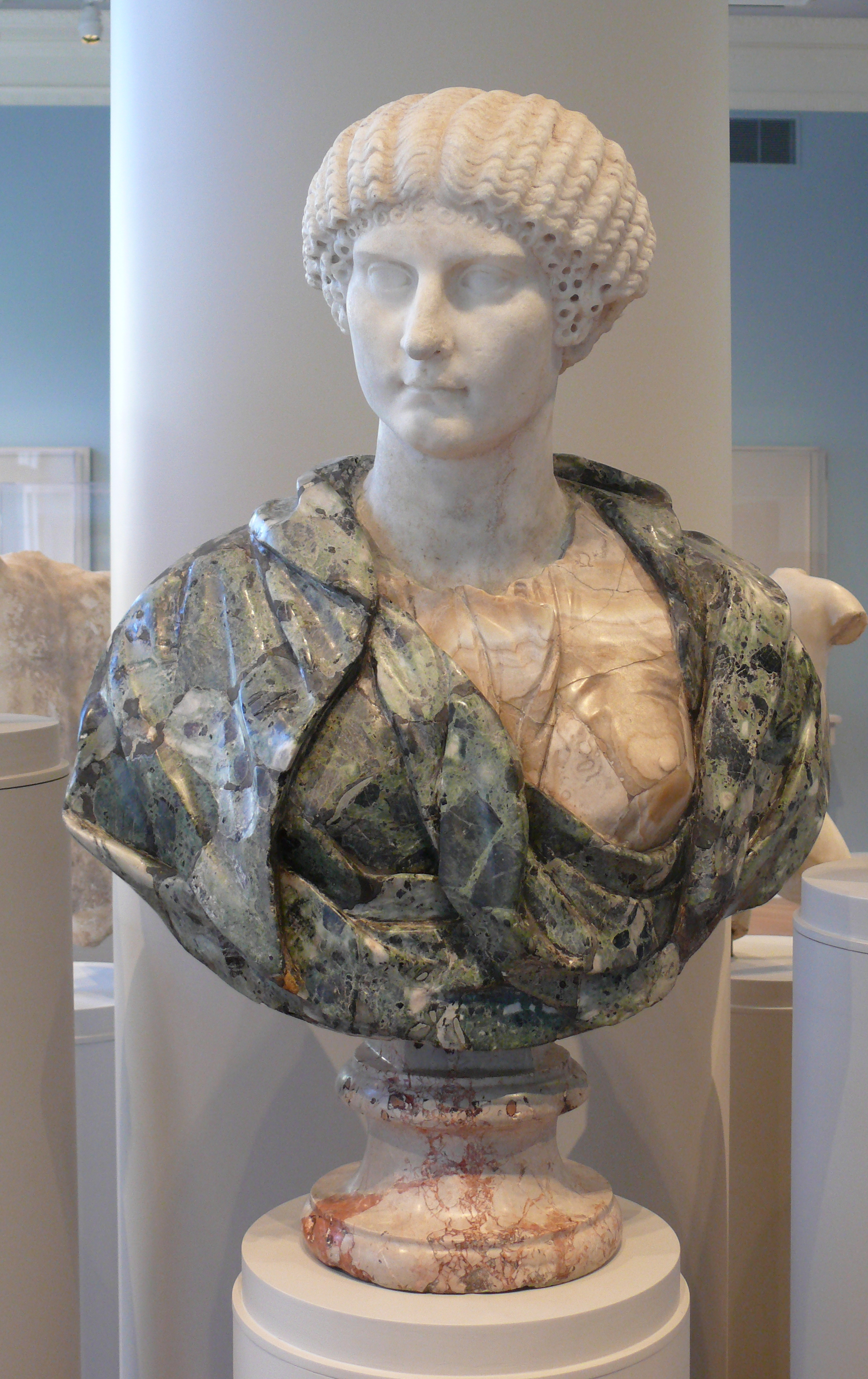
Eighteenth century verde antico bust, with an ancient Parian marble head of Agrippina minor, Rhode Island School of Design Museum.

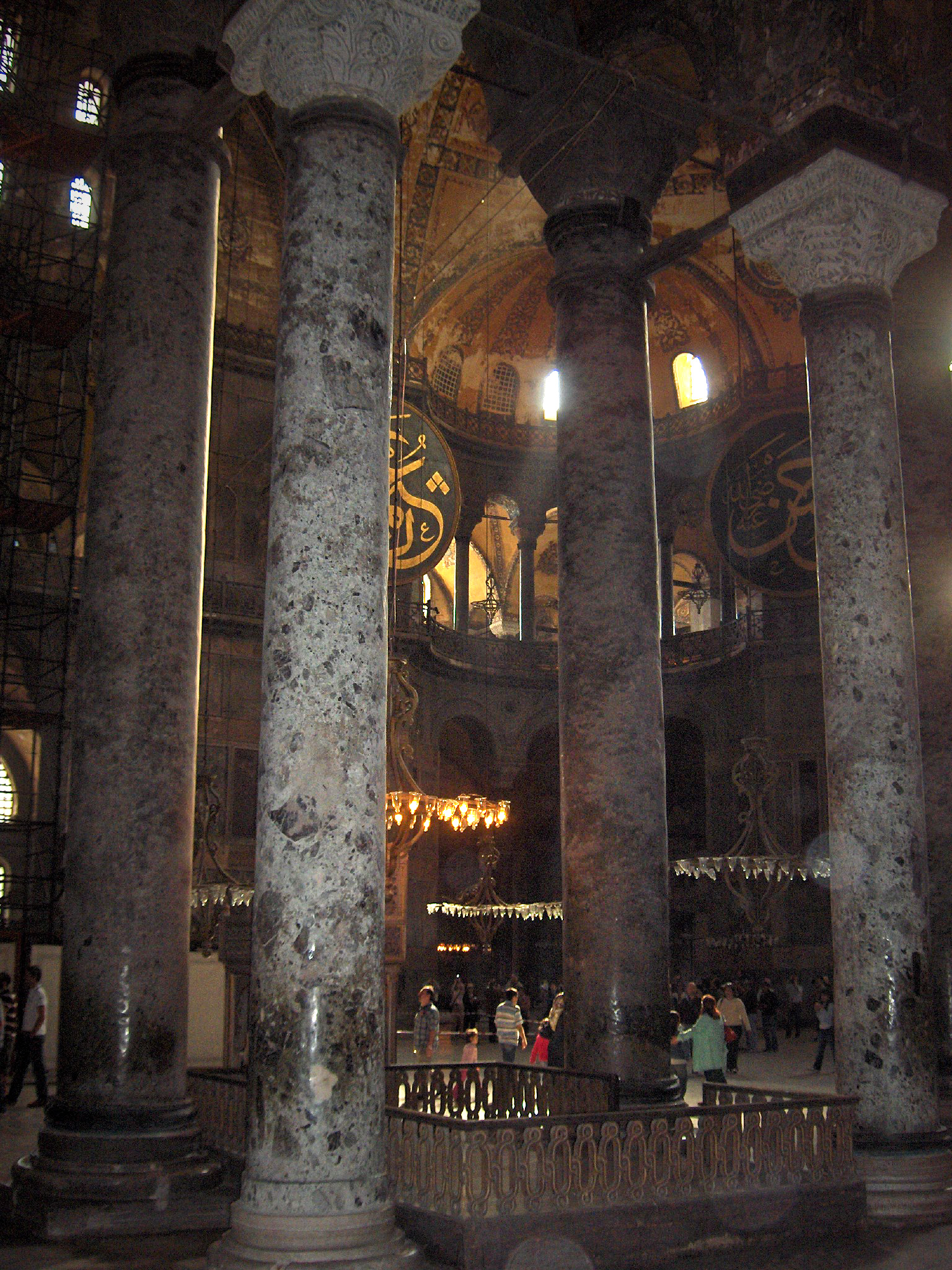
Sixth century verde antico Roman columns in Byzantium's Hagia Sophia

Verd antique (obsolete French, from Italian, verde antico, "ancient green"), also called verde antique, marmor thessalicum, or Ophite, is a serpentinite breccia popular since ancient times as a decorative facing stone. It is a dark, dull green, white-mottled (or white-veined) serpentine, mixed with calcite, dolomite, or magnesite, which takes a high polish. The term verd antique has been documented in English texts as early as 1745.

It is sometimes classed, erroneously, as a variety of marble ("Thessalian marble", "serpentine marble", "Moriah stone", etc.). It has also been called and marketed as "ophicalcite" or "ophite".

Non-brecciated varieties of a very similar serpentinite, sometimes also called "verd antique", have been quarried at Victorville, California; Cardiff, Maryland; Holly Springs, Georgia; and Rochester in Addison County, Vermont.

== Uses ==
Verd antique is used like marble especially in interior decoration and occasionally as outdoor trim, although the masses are frequently jointed and often only small slabs can be secured.

The ancient Romans quarried it especially at Casambala, near Larissa, Thessaly, in Greece. This variety was known as marmor thessalicum or Thessalian marble. In Diocletian's Edict on Maximum Prices, Thessalian marble was priced at 150 denarii per cubic foot - more expensive than the valuable Egyptian grey granite of Mons Claudianus, known as granito del foro, and red granite of Aswan, called lapis syenites, higher priced than cipollino from Carystus, and exceeded only in value by Synnadic or Docimaean marble from Docimium, porphyritic green lapis Lacedaemonius from Laconia, and imperial porphyry from Mons Porphyrites. Green Thessalicum was three times the price of grey-white marble from Thassos.

Verd antique was much used by the monumental builders of the Byzantine Empire and by the Ottomans after them; columns and revetments of verde antico are common in Istanbul's monuments, many inherited from the city's time as Constantinople. The Justinianic Hagia Sophia, Church of SS. Sergius & Bacchus, Church of Hagios Polyeuctus, the Monastery of Saint John Prodromos 'at Stoudios', and the Church of the Holy Apostles all used marmor thessalicum extensively, including large monolithic columns. The Justinianic San Vitale at Ravenna also employs Thessalian columns.

Verd antique from Larissa was used in the fifth-century churches of Thessaloniki. Columns, ambons, iconostasis, and fonts of verd antique are found in the Church of the Acheiropoietos, Hagios Demetrios, and Hagia Sophia, Thessaloniki. Evliya Çelebi described the green ambo of Hagia Sophia was a ‘rare admirable artistic piece of construction’ ... ‘one of the monuments of the whole world’. This ambo of Hagia Sophia in Thessaloniki is now in the Istanbul Archaeology Museum. Another, smaller such ambo exists in the church of Hagios Minas in Thessaloniki, with another sixth-century Thessalicum ambo discovered among other ecclesiastical stonework in the "Marzamemi shipwreck" off Sicily.

Thessalian marble appeared in the Monastery of Hosios Loukas in Boeotia, at Philippi in the A and B Basilicas and the ‘Octagon’, and in basilicae at Amphipolis, on Thasos, in Dion, in the cathedral at Stobi, at Kato Milia in Pieria, at Stagoi, and Saint John's at Ephesus. In ancient Neapolis, a Thessalian stone outside a church dedicated to Saint Nicholas is said to mark where the Apostle Paul disembarked for Philippi.

ʿAbd al-Malik's Dome of the Rock, ʿAbd ar-Raḥman I's Grand Mosque of Córdoba, and Charlemagne's Palatine Chapel at Aachen all used Thessalian verd antique. The Cappella Corsini of Santa Maria del Carmine, Florence, and Santa Maria Maggiore and Santa Susanna in Rome all have verd antique decoration.

Thirteen Roman imperial sarcophagi of the Byzantine period were of verd antique, according to the Patria Constantinopoleos and the works of Constantine VII Porphyrogenitus. Nine emperors and eight other imperial figures, mostly empresses, are known to have been buried in such sarcophagi. Zeno, Justin II, Constantine V, Michael I Rangabe, Theophilus and his co-emperor son Constantine, Michael III, Basil I, and Alexander were all entombed in this way. Such sarcophagi are found today in Hagia Sophia and in the Istanbul Archaeological Museum.

Subsequently, many Ottoman mosques incorporated verd antique columns and other material, as at the Süleymaniye Mosque.

== Connemara marble ==
Verd antique is very similar in colour to the national gemstone of Ireland, Connemara marble. Connemara marble differs from the verd antiques in that it is an actual marble, rather than a serpentinite breccia, despite also having a very high serpentine content. It is named after the region in the western part of the country in which it is quarried (including Lissoughter in Recess, County Galway, and in Clifden).
