= Statuette of Aphrodite on a dolphin =

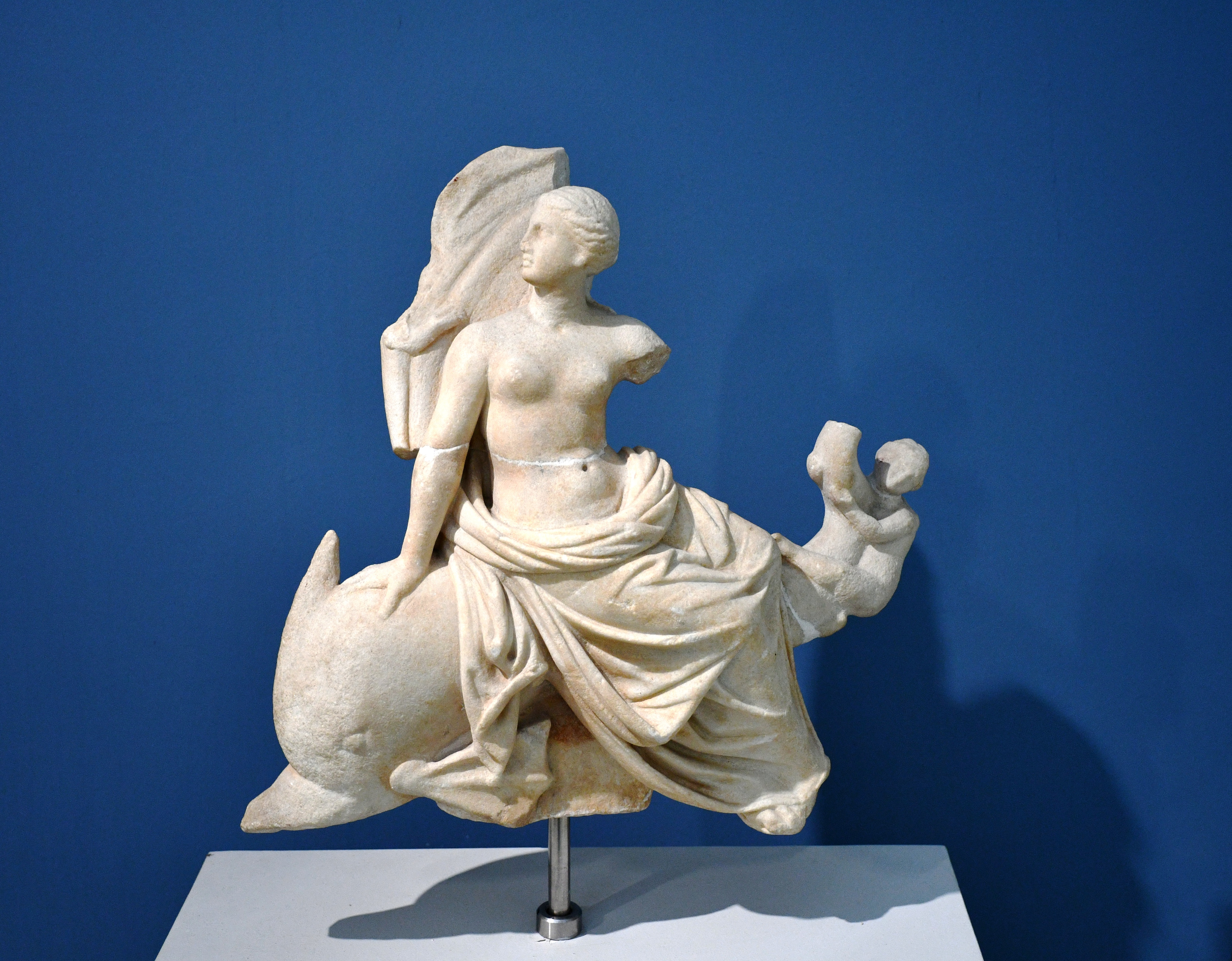
- Statuette of Aphrodite on a dolphin (Thasos)
- Year: 1st-2nd centuries BC
- Medium: Marble
- Movement: Hellenistic
- Subject: the goddess Aphrodite
- Condition: Mostly intact; left arm and dolphin's tail missing
- Location: Archaeological Museum of Thasos, Thasos

The statuette of Aphrodite on a Dolphin is an ancient Greek statuette of the goddess Aphrodite kept in the Archaeological Museum of Thasos. The work was created and discovered on Thasos, a Greek island with a rich tradition of sculpture thanks to its white marble deposits. It is considered one of the museum's most recognizable exhibits and has traveled on loan to exhibitions outside the island.

== Provenance ==
The statuette belongs to the Hellenistic period and is dated between the 2nd and 1st centuries BC. It was found in the Sanctuary of Poseidon in Thasos, which was located near the ancient port of the island. Aphrodite was also worshiped at the location, and the work was apparently a votive offering to her. The coexistence of Aphrodite and Poseidon in the same sanctuary was frequent, as sailors sought the protection of both for safe voyages.

== Description ==
Aphrodite, the Greek goddess of love, sits on the back of a dolphin, referencing her marine birth. In her now missing hand, Aphrodite is thought to have held her headdress. A small Cupid (Greek Eros) appears on the dolphin's tail.
