= Connemara marble =

National gemstone of Ireland

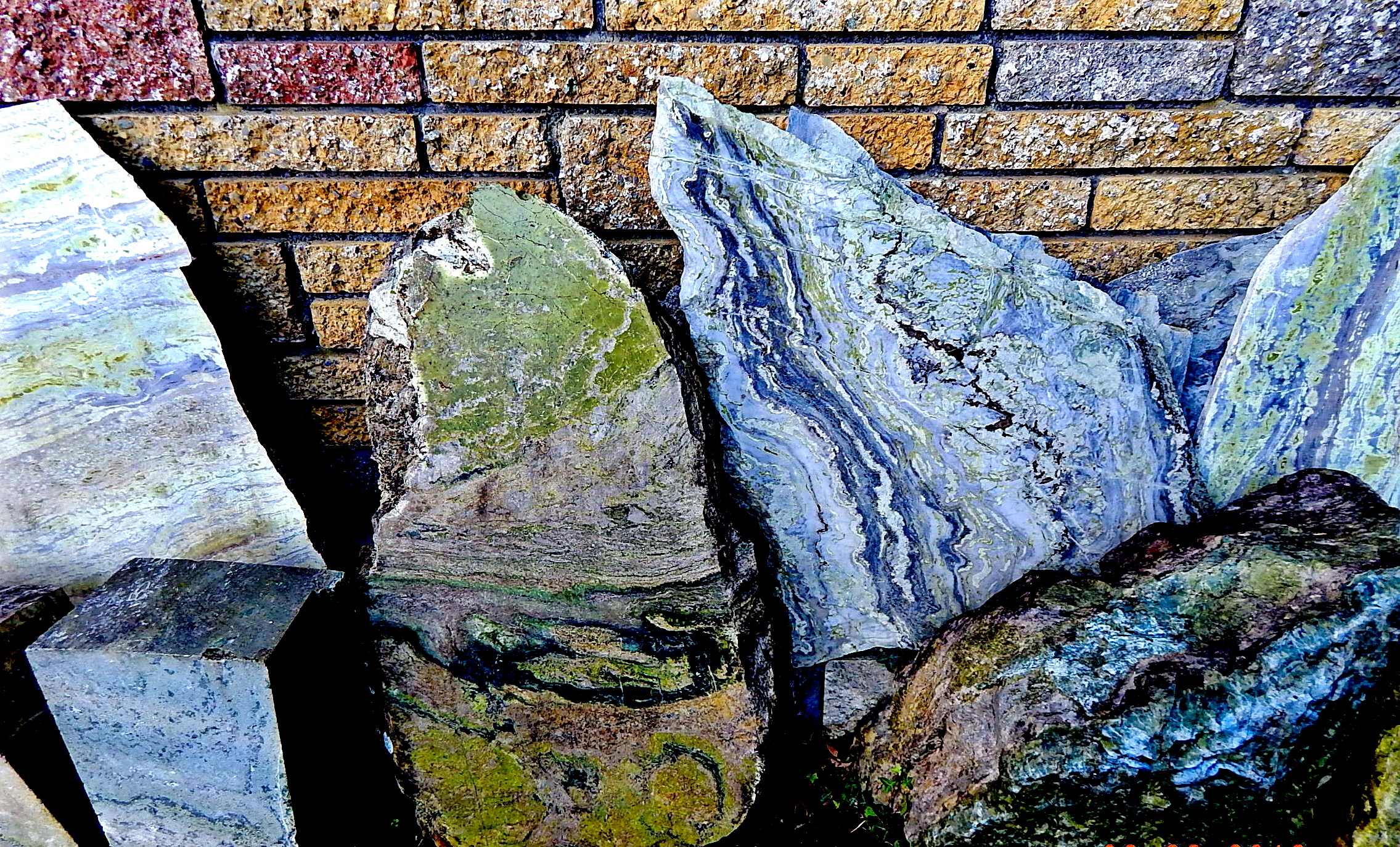
The distinct green colour of the middle slab is a result of an abundance of serpentine minerals

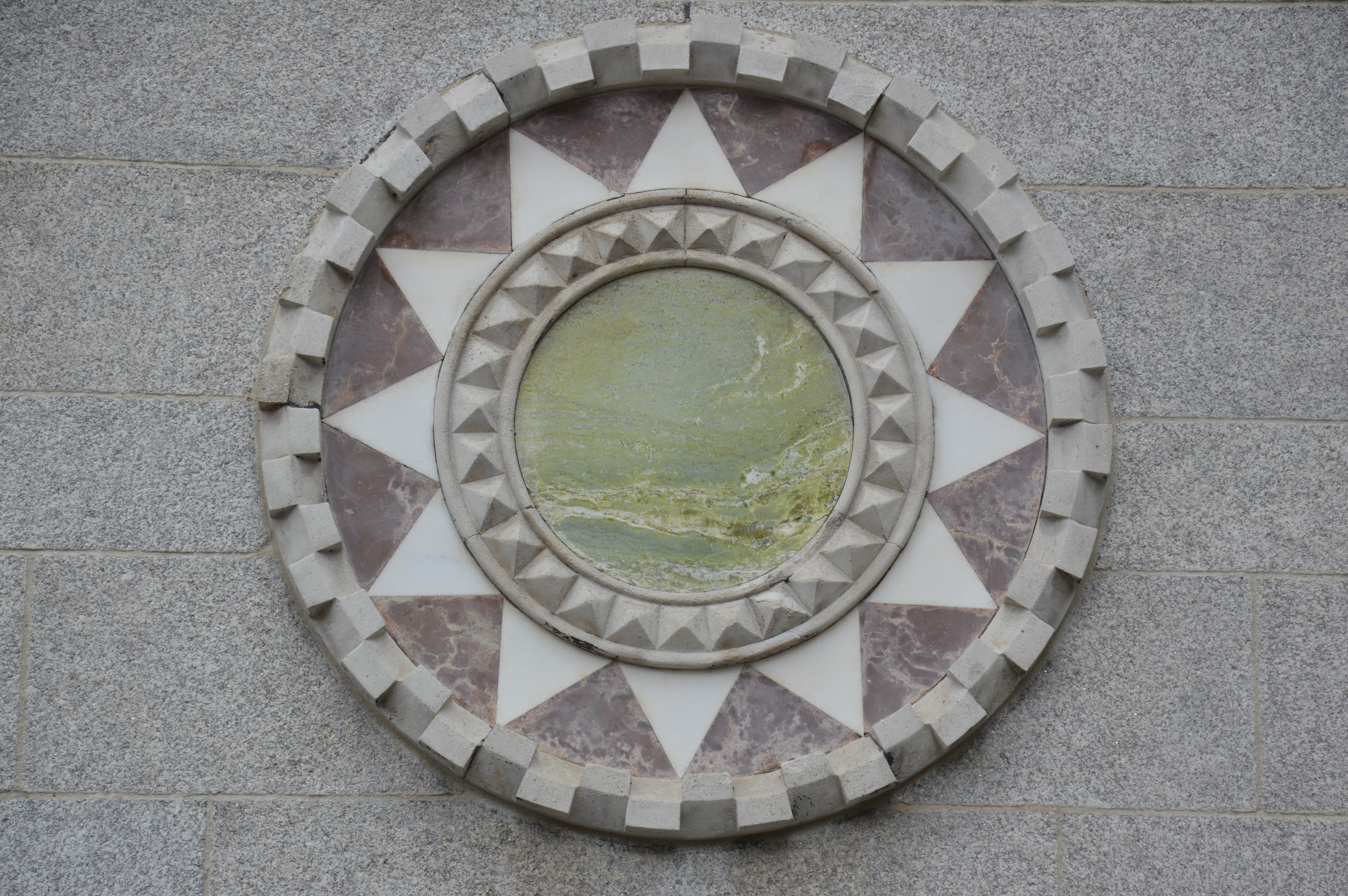
Connemara marble ornament, Museum Building, Trinity College Dublin

Connemara marble or "Irish green" is a rare variety of green marble from Connemara, Ireland. It is used as a decoration and building material. Its colour causes it to often be associated with the Irish identity, and for this reason it has been named the national gemstone of Ireland. It strongly resembles the verd antique, a green serpentinite breccia found in the Mediterranean. It is named after the region in which it is found (including Lissoughter in Recess, County Galway, and in Clifden). The marble was deposited as a limestone mud during the neoproterozoic.

== Geology ==
Connemara marble differs from the verd antiques in that it is an actual marble, rather than a serpentinite breccia, despite also having a very high serpentine content. As a marble, the most important mineral components are dolomite and calcite, supplemented with variable amounts of diopside,serpentine, tremolite, forsterite, clinochlore, phlogopite, omphacite and talc. The colour is determined by the coloured mineral content, with serpentine responsible for the characteristic green colouration.

Connemara marble occurs as layers within the Connemara Marble Formation from the lower Dalradian Appin Group, part of the Connemara Metamorphic Complex. The parent rock was an impure silica-rich dolomitic limestone deposited in a continental shelf on the margin of Laurentia. In the Grampian Orogeny, about 460 million years ago during the ordovician period, it underwent silimanite grade metamorphism. Minerals formed at this stage were a variety of calc-silicates, including diopside, forsterite and tremolite, together with talc and chlorite. Subsequent hydrothermal alteration (metasomatism), probably associated with hydrothermal fluids that were produced around the late Caledonian Galway granites, altered the calc-silicates to minerals of the serpentine subgroup. The layers of marble are interbedded with schists and quartzites.

== Uses ==
Connemara marble is used in souvenirs, jewellery and home decoration. It is not suitable for usage in outside construction as it rapidly loses its colouration due to weathering. It has been quarried since the 1700s, and has been exported throughout Europe and America to make columns, floors and other decorations.

In the Galway quarry, there is a pocket of a rare Connemara marble called Irish Jade. The walls and door frames of the Senate Chamber of the Capitol Building in Harrisburg, Pennsylvania are done in a variety of Irish Jade marble. It was installed in 1901.

== See also ==
- List of types of marble
- list of decorative stones
