= Kouros of Thasos =

Ancient Greek marble statue from Thasos

The Kouros of Thasos, also known as the Rambearer (Kryophoros), a statue about 3.5 meters high, was carved around 600–580 BC from local Thasian marble.

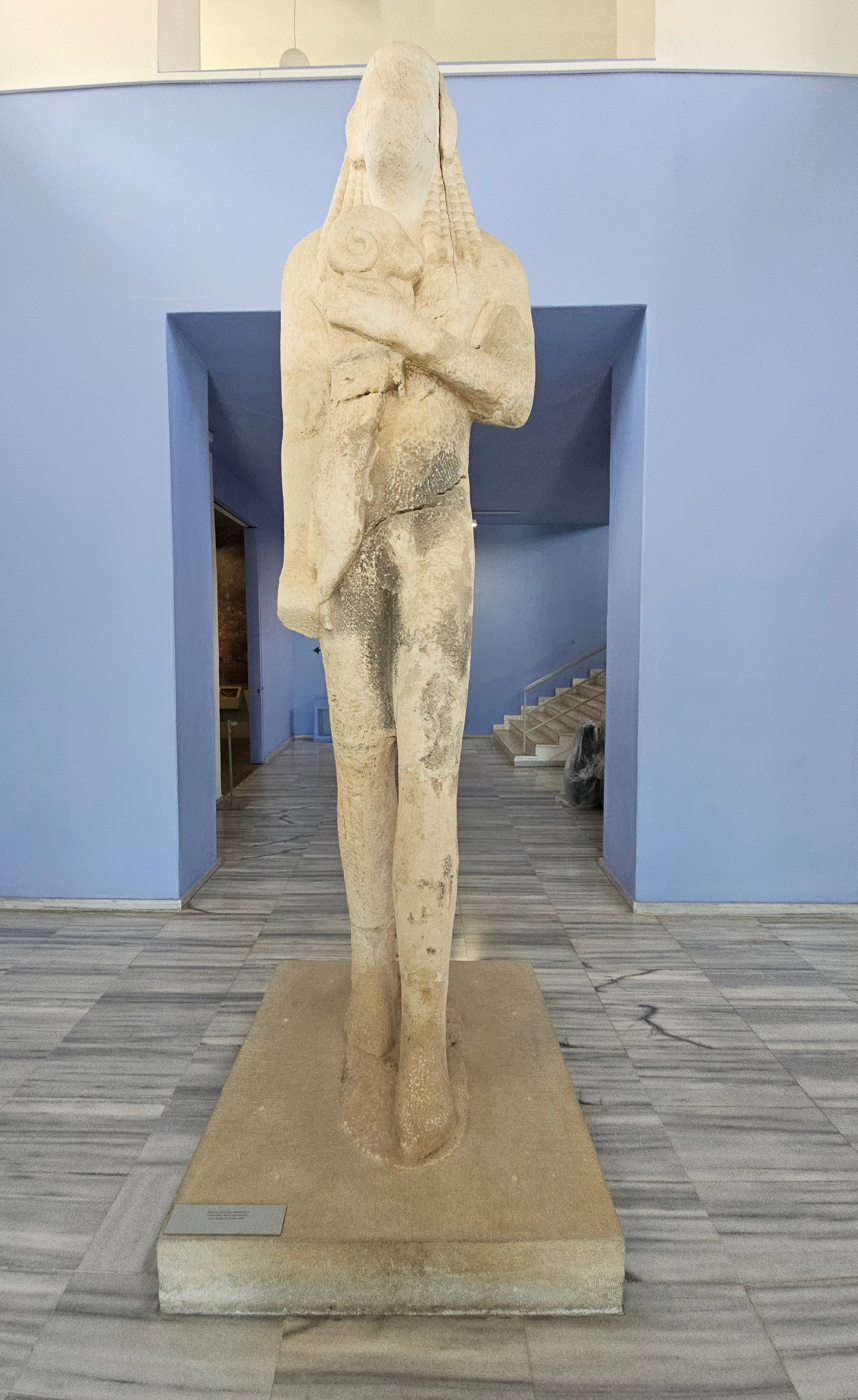
Kouros of Thasos

It was discovered in 1911 on the Acropolis of Thasos, specifically in the Pythian area, during the excavations of the French School. Today, having been fully restored, it dominates as the most emblematic exhibit in the reception hall of the Archaeological Museum of Thasos.

== Description ==
The statue depicts a naked young man carrying a ram on his shoulders. This ram-bearing representation is directly linked to the cultic and ritual context of antiquity, as the animal was a symbol of sacrifice. Scholars believe that the kouros either depicts the god Hermes or, more likely, a devotee carrying the ram as an offering to the god Apollo. Despite its monumental size, the work remained unfinished in its final details, with the exception of its elaborate hair. Its abandonment by the sculptor is due to a crack that appeared in the marble near the left ear during work in the quarry. Nevertheless, the statue was transported to the ancient city to be erected, demonstrating its great value to the community. The subsequent history of the statue is linked to the change in its use in the following centuries. The kouros was found broken into five pieces, as during the medieval period it had been reused as a common building material for the construction of the wall. This wall was located in the area of the ancient sanctuary of Hercules (Heraklion). Hercules was worshipped in Thassos not only as a hero but also as a protector god, making his sanctuary the most important religious and cult center of the ancient city.

== "Heraklion Amma" ==
Of particular interest is the back of the colossal sculpture, which the visitor can admire from the upper floor of the museum. While the body of the statue remains unfinished, its hair has been elaborately worked. The rich locks of its hairstyle fall in an organized manner down the back, adorned with a relief ribbon that ends in a complex knot. This knot is called "Irakleion amma" (Hercules knot), a decorative and symbolic element that further emphasizes the work's ties to the island's religious tradition.

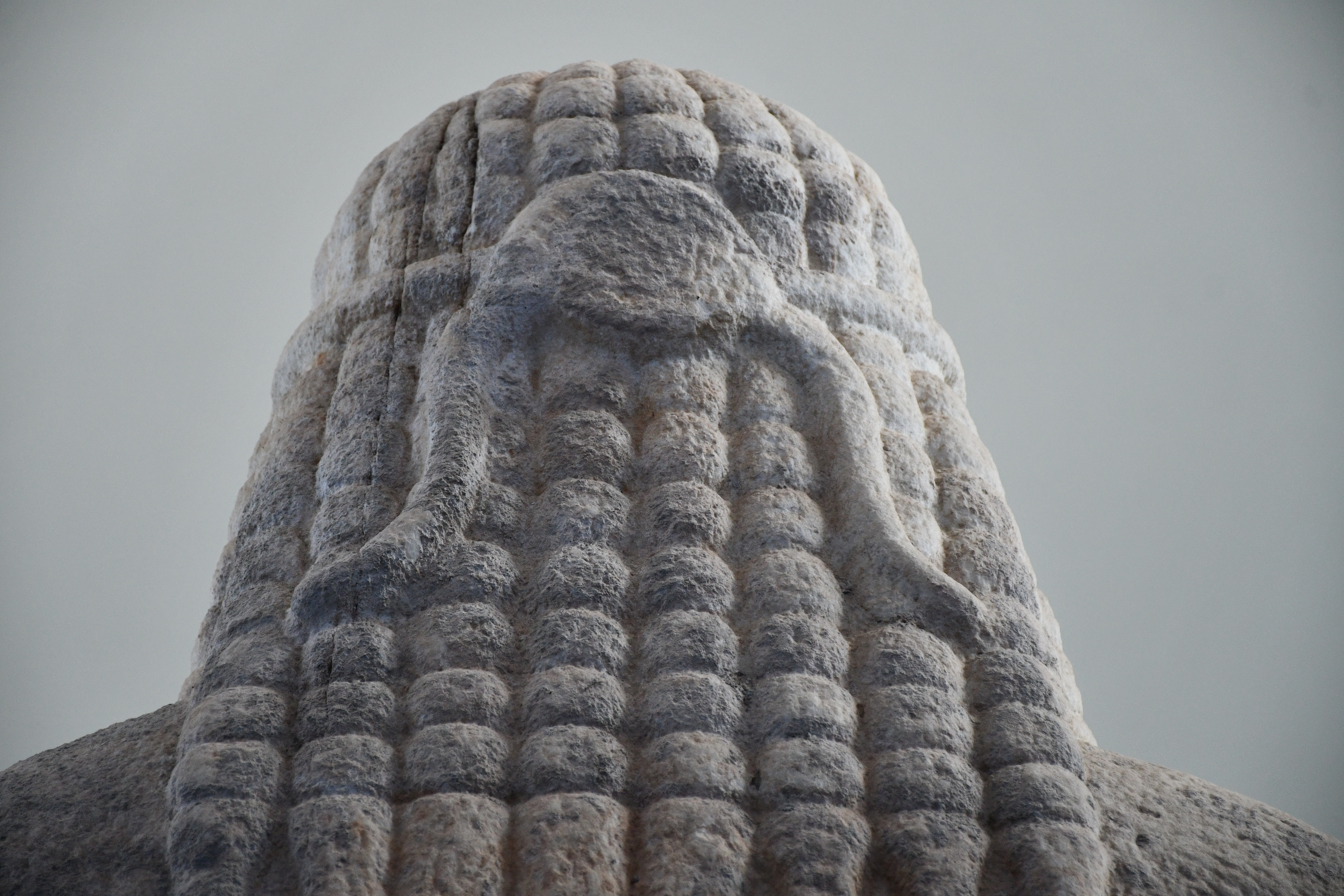
“Heraklion Amma”
