= Archaeological Museum of Thasos =

Museum in Thasos, Greece

Coordinates: 40.7798°N 24.7119°E

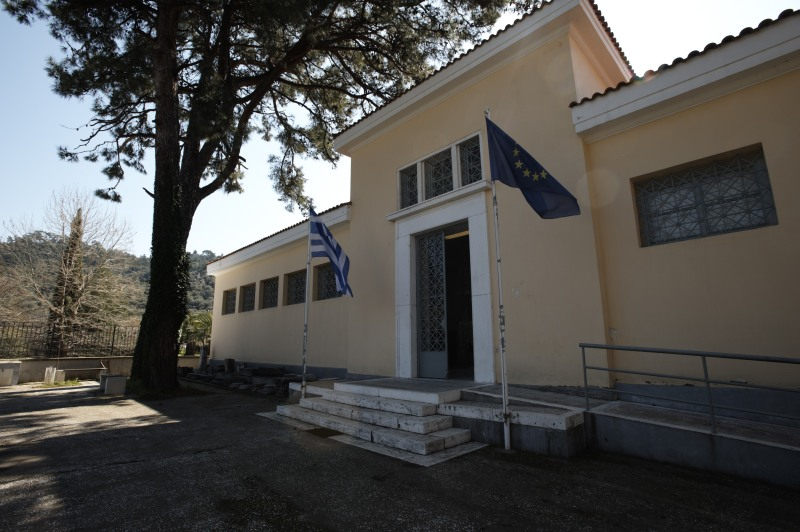
External view

The Archaeological Museum of Thasos is a museum located in Limenas on the island of Thasos, Eastern Macedonia, Greece. It occupies a house that was built in 1934 and recently extended. Storerooms and workshops have been restored, and are fully operational. These include the shop, the official functions room, the old wing, the prehistoric collection, and the new section.

The exhibits include collections of sculpture, pottery, and architectural remains from the Neolithic to the Roman period on Thasos. The most important exhibits from the early period are a clay amphora from the Neolithic settlement and a Cycladic plate decorated with a representation of the hero Bellerophon on the winged Pegasus spearing the three-headed Chimaera (7th century BC).

Two of the sculptures of the Archaic period are outstanding: an impressive three-and-a-half-metre kouros of Thasos, a statue of a young naked man carrying a goat (600 bc), which was found at Pythion; and a bust of Pegasus (500 bc). Of the exhibits from the Classical period, particularly noteworthy are a head of Dionysos of the 4th century BC, which belonged to the larger-than-life-size statue of the god that graced the large exedra of one of the two choregic monuments in the Temple of Dionysos, and a statue of Comedy.

From the Hellenistic and Roman period there are a statue of a Muse wearing a peplos, also from the Temple of Dionysos (3rd century BC), a Statuette of Aphrodite on a dolphin (3rd century BC), a head of Alexander, and a statue of the Roman emperor Hadrian, armed for battle. The latter was found in the ancient agora of Thasos. There are also portrait busts of Claudius, Julius Caesar, and Lucius Caesar, and clay figurines dating from the Archaic to the Hellenistic period.

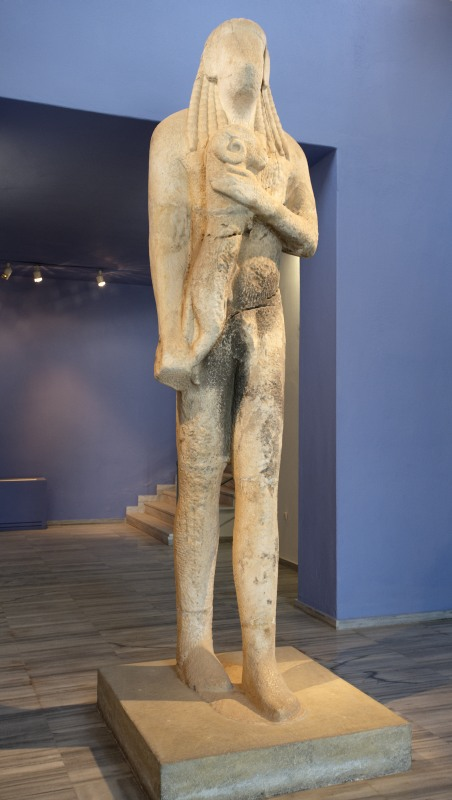
Archaic period Kouros from Pithio, Thassos

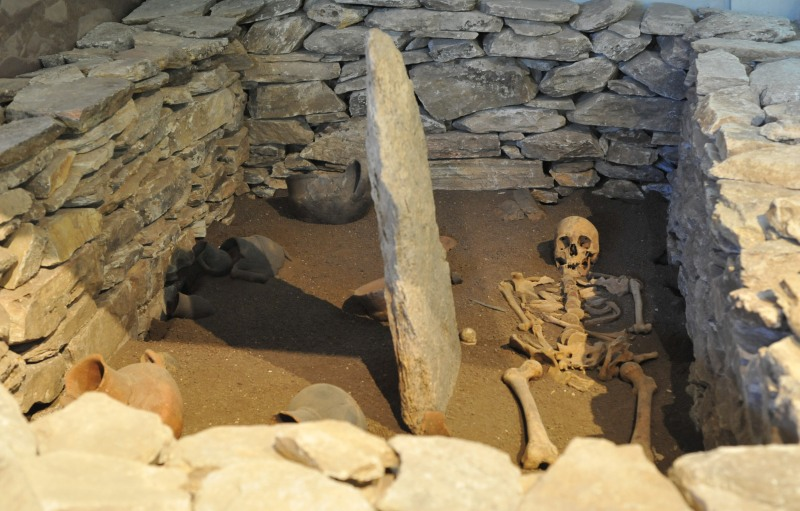
Reconstruction of ancient cemetery

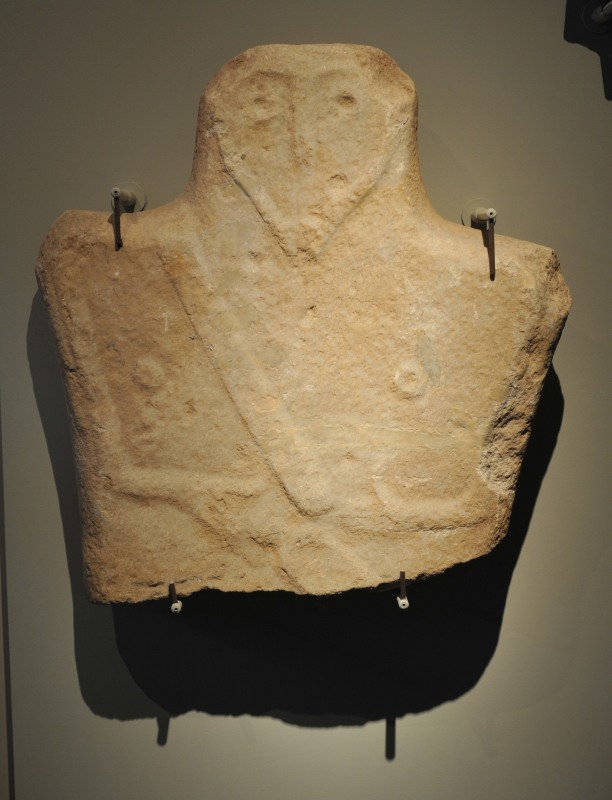
Samples of rock carvings

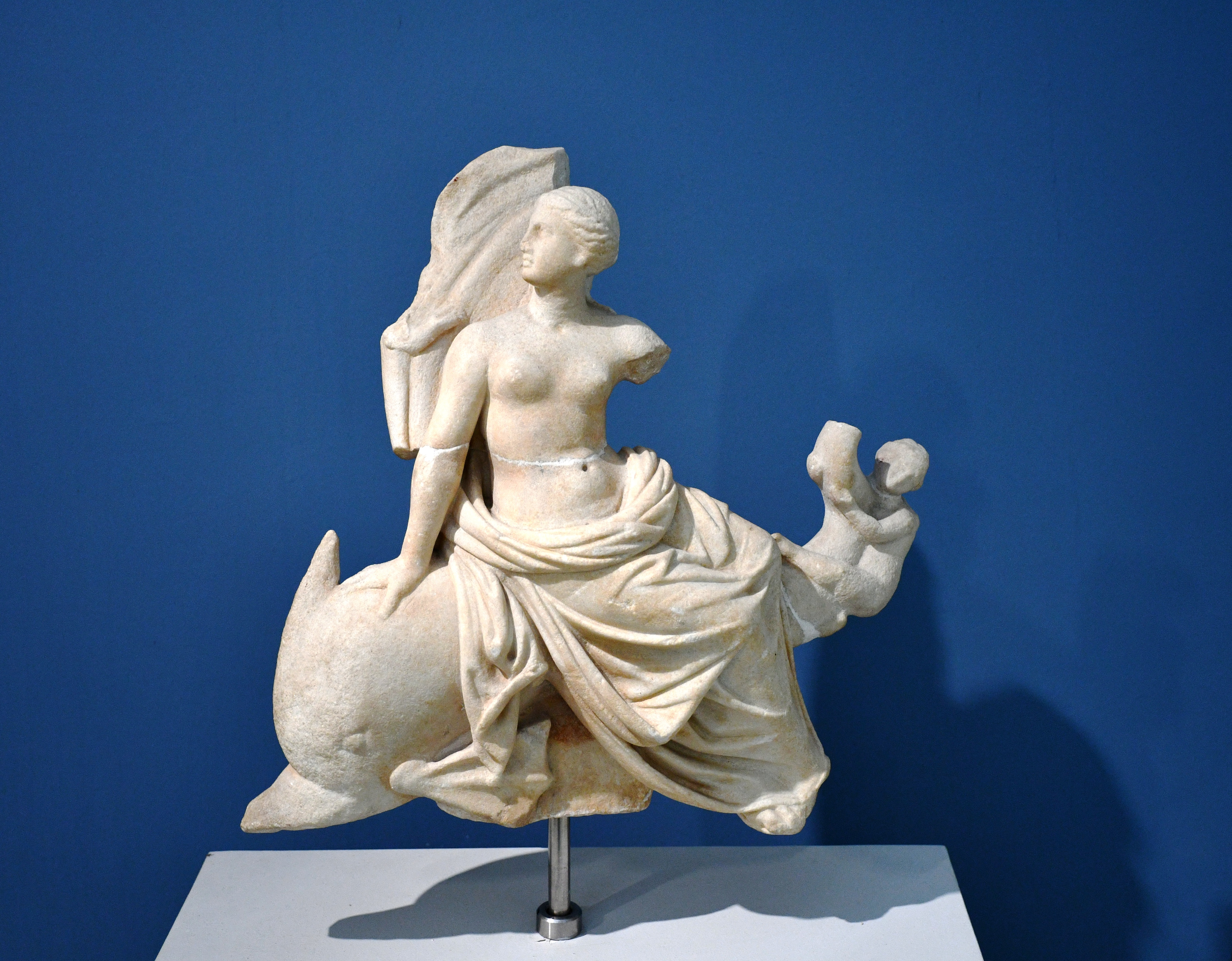
Statuette of Aphrodite on a dolphin

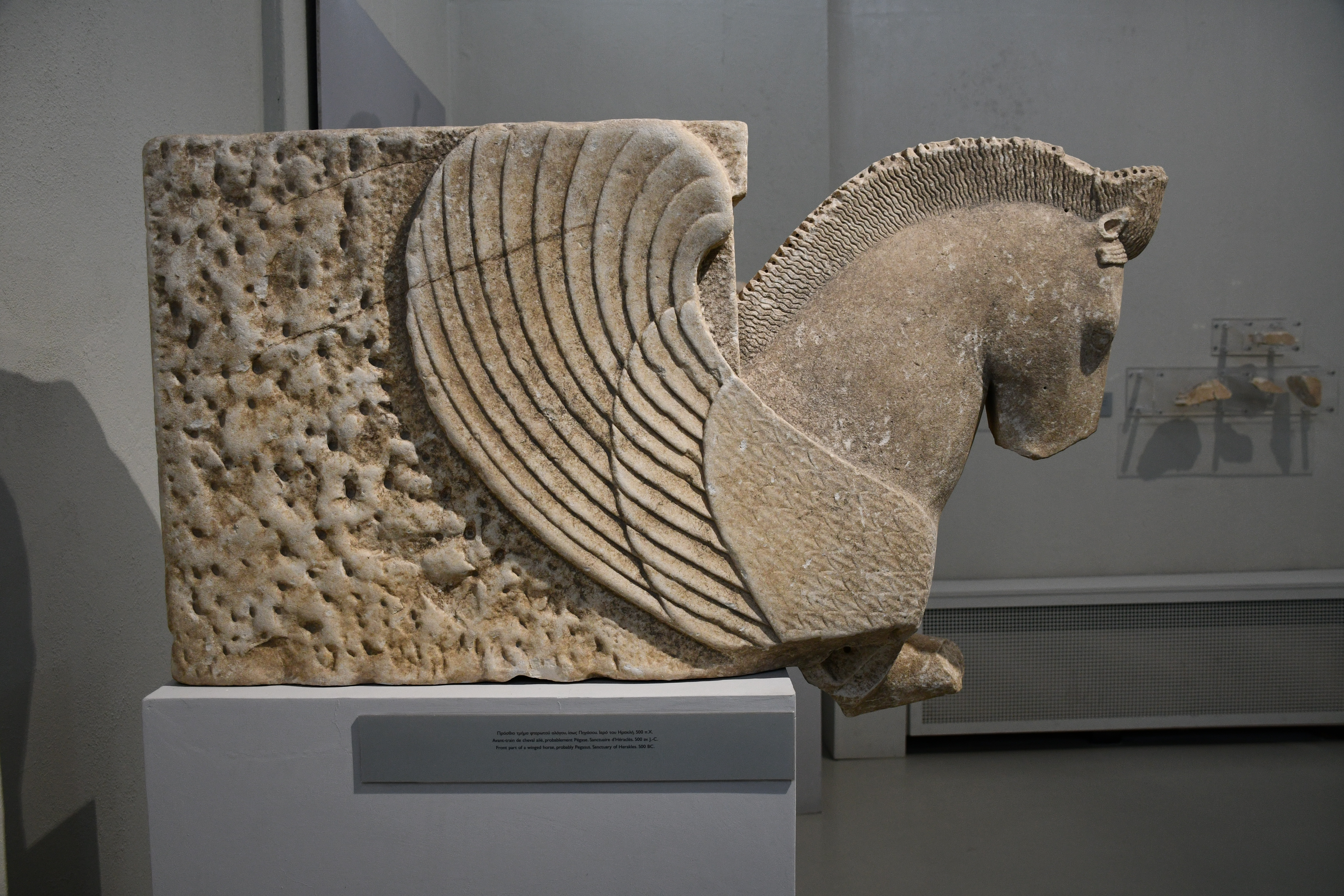
Front part of a winged horse, perhaps Pegasus, Sanctuary of Hercules (500 BC.)

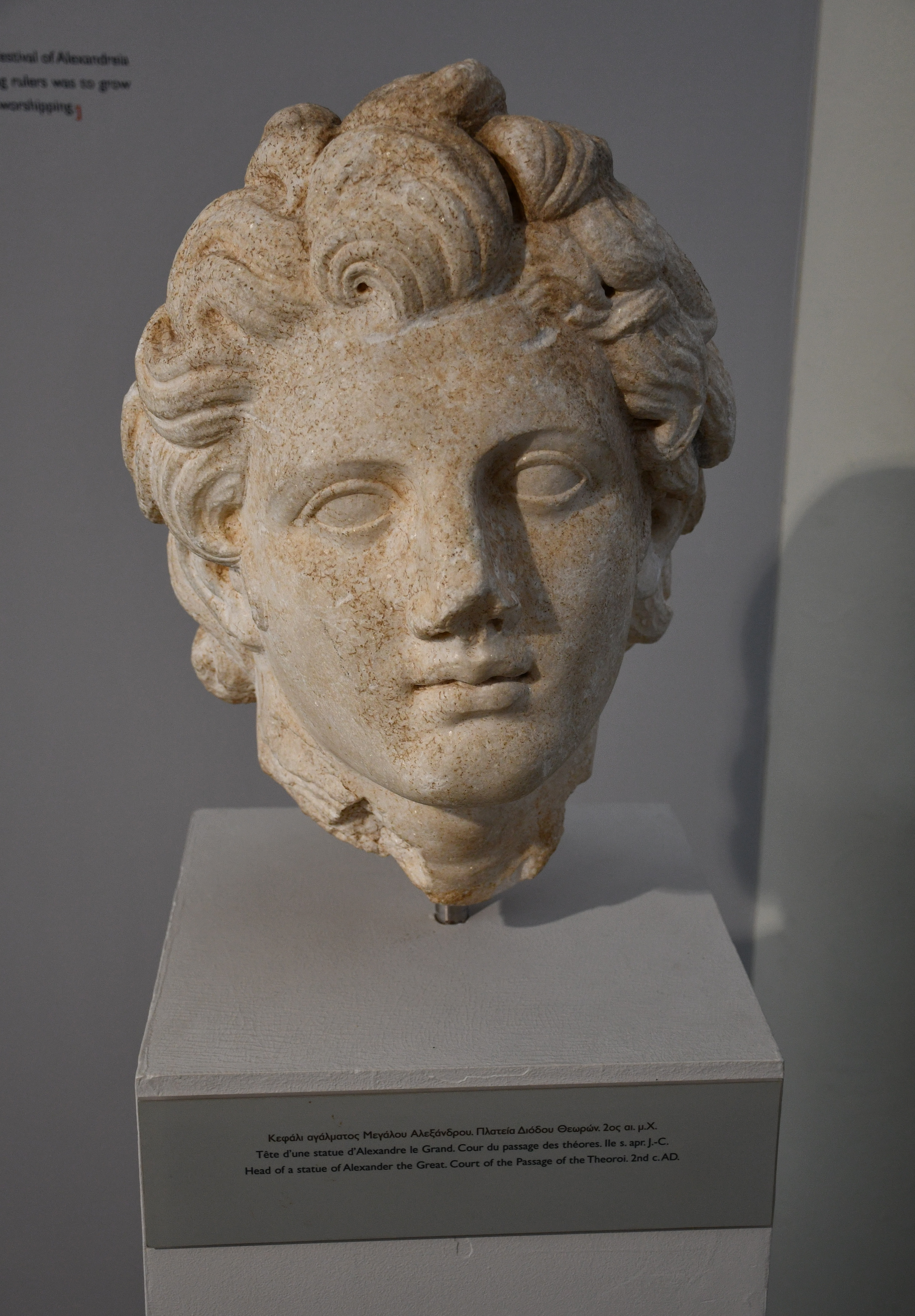
Head of a statue of Alexander the Great, Diodou Theoron Square (2nd century AD)

== Sources ==
- This article incorporates text from the corresponding article at the Museums of Macedonia website, commissioned by the Macedonian Heritage foundation, written by Vlasis Vlasidis, and published under a CC-BY-SA-3.0 license.
