= Church of the Acheiropoietos =

5th-century Byzantine church in Thessaloniki, Greece

- Panagia Theotokos
- [Παναγία] Ἀχειροποίητος
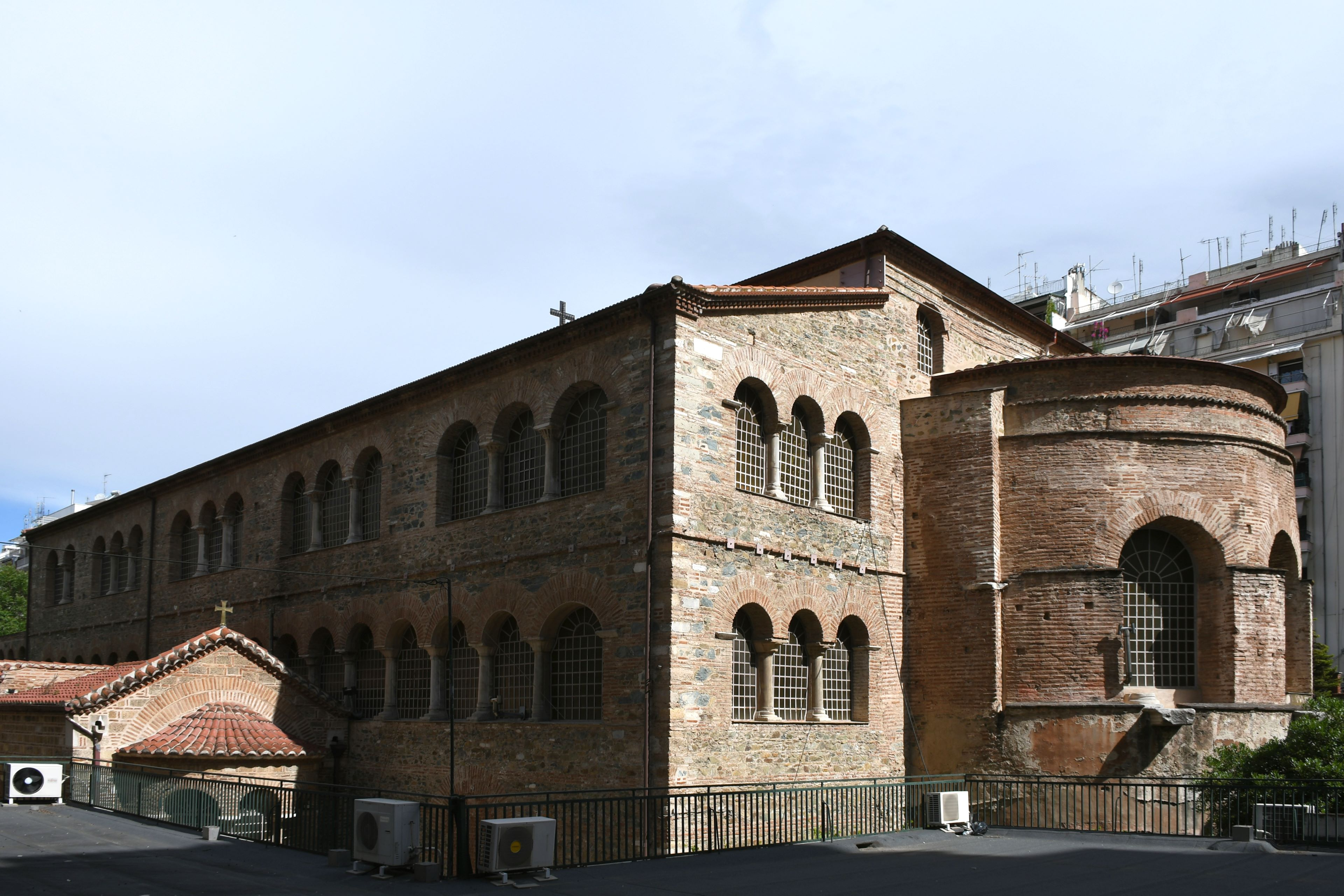
- The church in 2019

- Location of the church in Greece
- Church of the Acheiropoietos
- 40°38′5″N 22°56′52″E
- Location: Thessaloniki, Central Macedonia
- Country: Greece
- Denomination: Greek Orthodox

History
- Status: Church
- Dedication: Panagia

Architecture
- Functional status: Active
- Architectural type: Basilica
- Style: Byzantine
- Completed: 5th century

Specifications
- Length: 36.5 m (120 ft)
- Width: 28 m (92 ft)

Administration
- Province: Ecumenical Patriarchate of Constantinople
- Metropolis: Thessaloniki
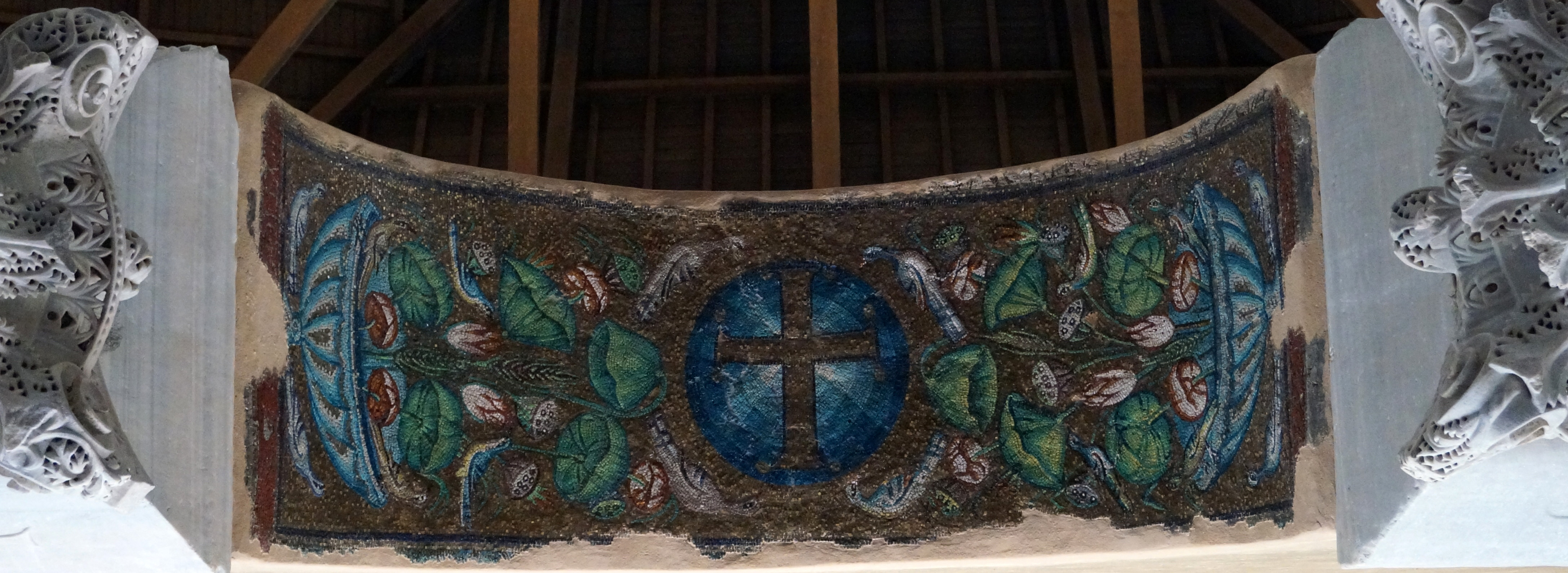
- Mosaic inside the church

UNESCO World Heritage Site
- Location: Thessaloniki, Central Macedonia
- Part of: Paleochristian and Byzantine monuments of Thessaloniki
- Criteria: Cultural: (i), (ii), (iv)
- Reference: 456-003
- Inscription: 1988 (12th Session)
- Area: 0.375 ha (0.93 acres)

The Church of the Acheiropoietos (Greek: [Παναγία] Ἀχειροποίητος) is a 5th-century Byzantine-era Greek Orthodox church, located in the city of Thessaloniki, Central Macedonia, in northern Greece. It is situated in the city's centre, at Agias Sofias street opposite Makedonomachon square. Because of its outstanding early Byzantine architecture, the church was inscribed on the UNESCO World Heritage List in 1988 along with other Paleochristian and Byzantine monuments of Thessaloniki.

== History and description ==
The Acheiropoietos has been dated from its bricks and mosaics to c. 450 – c. 470, making it perhaps the earliest of the city's surviving churches. It was modified in the 7th and again in the 14th–15th centuries. Known as the Panagia Theotokos in Byzantine times, it is dedicated to Mary. Its current name is first attested in 1320, presumably after a miraculous acheiropoietos ("not made by hands") icon of Panagia Hodegetria that was housed there. Byzantine sources also indicate that the cult of the city's patron saint, Saint Demetrius, was also practised there.

The building is a three-aisled basilica, that is 28 metres (92 ft) wide and 36.5 metres (120 ft) long, with a wooden roof. Its eastern end is a semicircular vault, while on the western side a narthex, flanked by towers, and traces of an exonarthex survive. The three aisles are separated by columns, while the two side aisles have galleries above them. At the eastern end of the northern side aisle, a middle Byzantine chapel dedicated to St. Irene is attached. On the northwestern corner of the basilica, the stairway leading to the galleries survives. The current entrance is through a triple-arched opening (tribelon) that connects the narthex with the main nave, while on the southern side there is a monumental entranceway, which probably connected the church with the city's Byzantine-era thoroughfare. Another small adjoining building on the south side has been identified as the church's baptistery. The modern roof is lower than the original, where the section above the central nave was elevated to allow light in.

The surviving parts of the church's rich original interior decoration include particularly fine 5th-century Ionian capitals from a Constantinopolitan workshop, the green Thessalian marble columns of the tribelon, the original Proconnesian marble pavement of the central nave, and fragments of 5th-century decorative mosaics. Fine but damaged early 13th-century frescoes depicting the Forty Martyrs of Sebaste adorn the southern side. Underneath the north aisle's current pavement, three layers of floor mosaics from an earlier Roman-era bath have been uncovered.

After Ottoman conquest of the city in 1430, the Acheiropoietos was the first church to be converted into a mosque, by Sultan Murad II himself. Throughout the Ottoman period, it remained the city's principal mosque under the name Eski Camii ("Old Mosque"). An inscription by Murad survives in the northern colonnade, on the eighth column from the east. In Ottoman Turkish, it reads Fetih Sultan Murad Khan - Şehr-i Selânik - 833; where 833 AH (1429/1430 CE) was the year the city fell under Turkish rule.

== Gallery ==
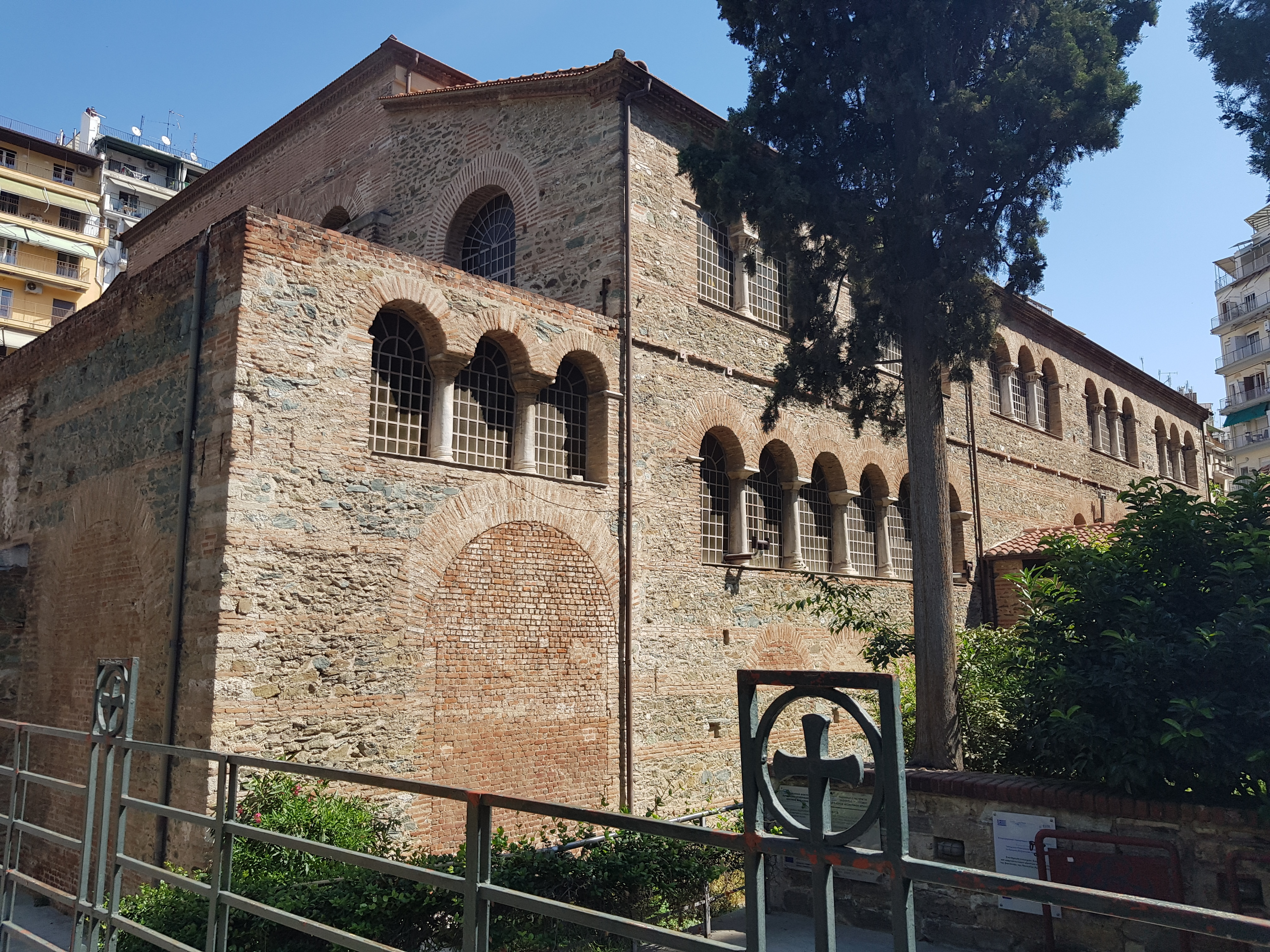
Backside view of the church

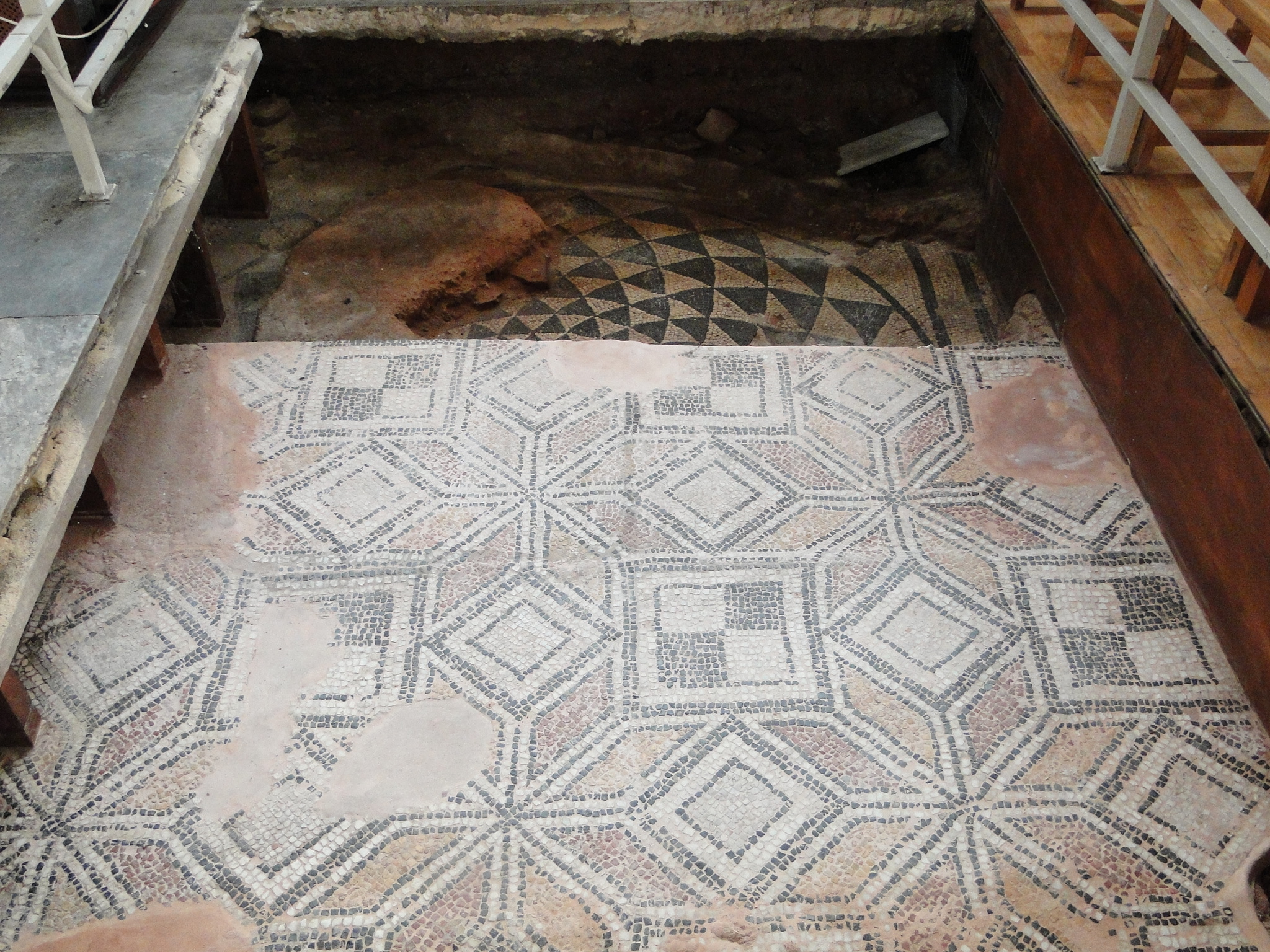
Roman era floor

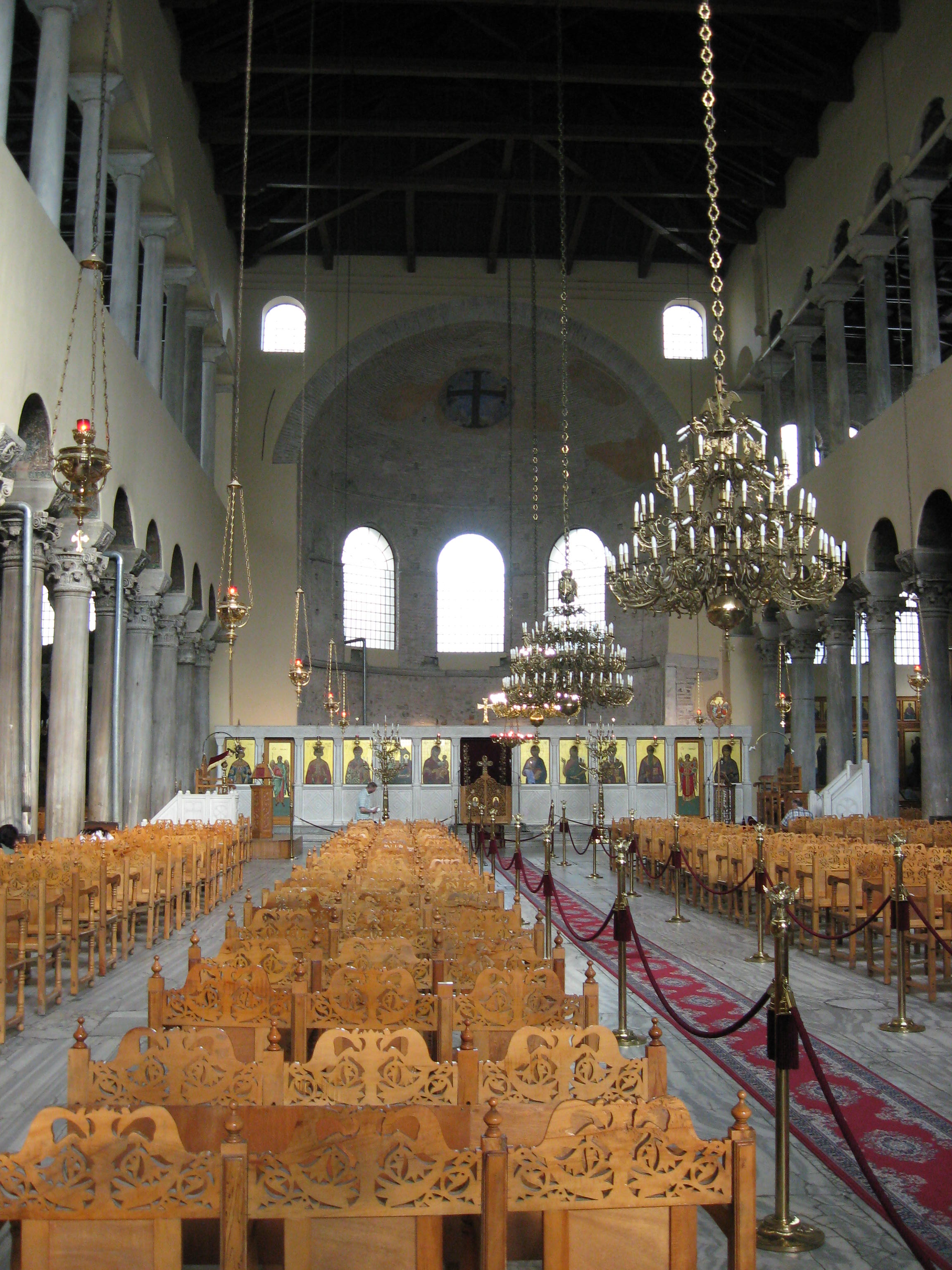
Interior

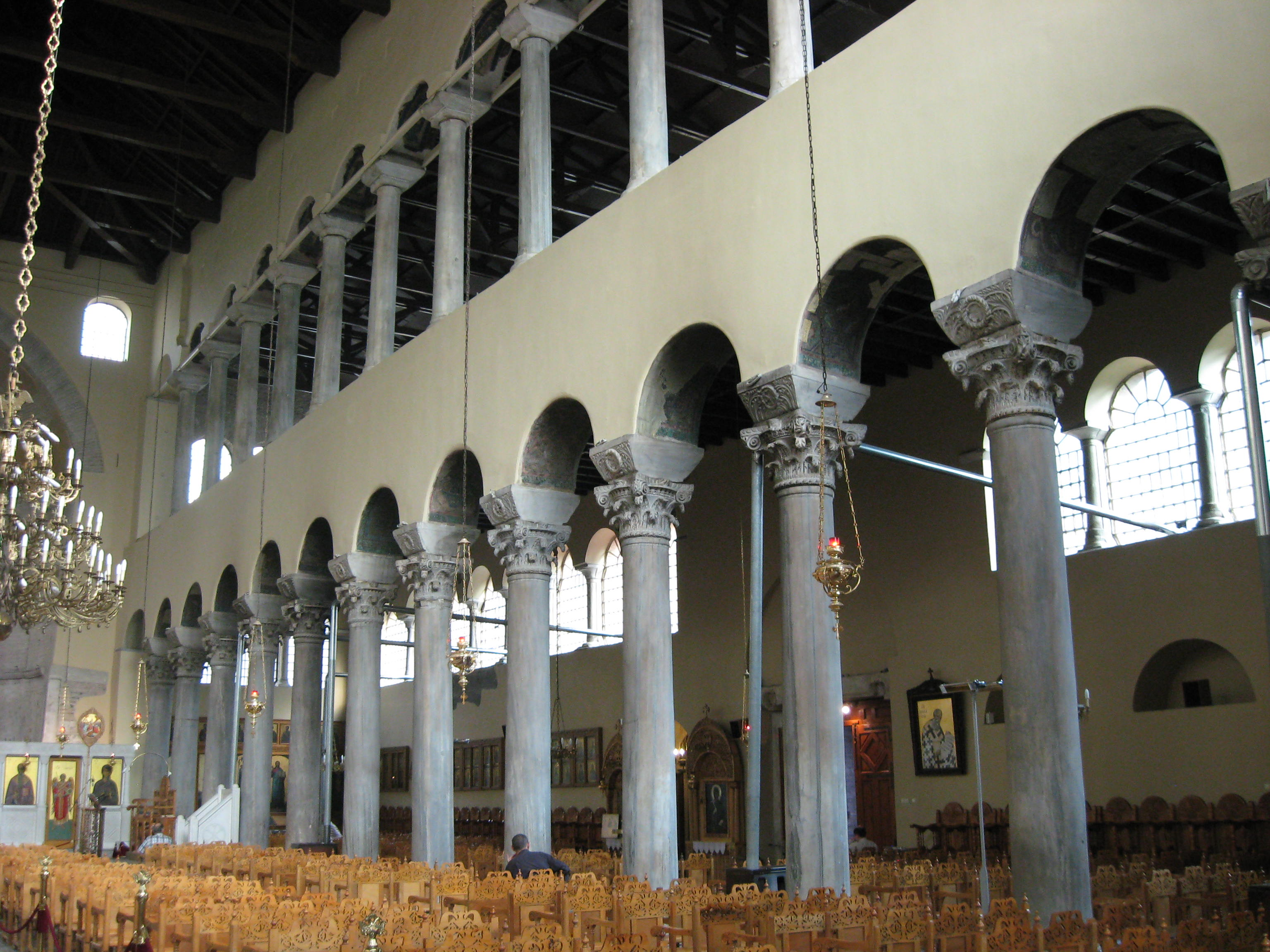
Interior

== See also ==
- Church of Greece
- List of Eastern Orthodox church buildings in Greece
- List of World Heritage Sites in Greece
