= Lissoughter =

Mountain in Galway, Ireland

- Cnoc Lios Uachtair
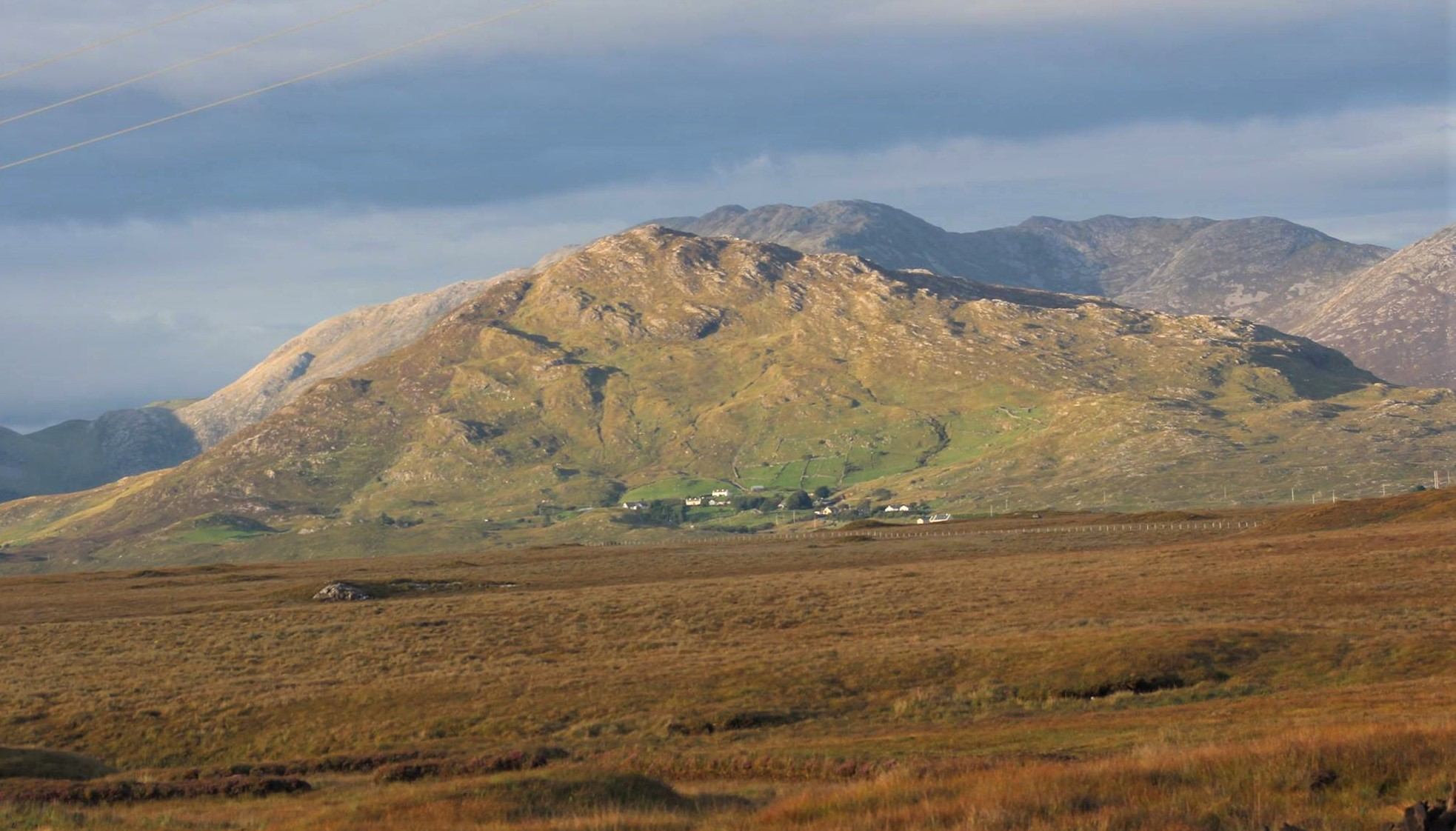
- Lissoughter from the southwest; the tallest peak behind it is Binn idir an da Log

Highest point
- Elevation: 401 m (1,316 ft)
- Prominence: 336 m (1,102 ft)
- Listing: Marilyn
- Coordinates: 53°29′01″N 9°43′07″W

Naming
- English translation: hill of the upper ringfort
- Language of name: Irish

Geography
- Location within island of Ireland
- Location: Recess, County Galway, Ireland
- Parent range: Twelve Bens-Maumturks
- OSI/OSNI grid: L8596849524
- Topo map: OSi Discovery 44

Geology
- Rock type(s): Pale quartzites, grits, graphitic top bedrock

Lissoughter or Lissoughter Hill (Irish: Cnoc Lios Uachtair, meaning 'hill of the upper ring-fort') is a prominent hill between the Twelve Bens and Maumturks mountain ranges, at the southern entrance to the Inagh Valley, in the Connemara National Park of County Galway, Ireland. With a height of 401 metres (1,316 ft), it does not qualify to be an Arderin or a Vandeleur-Lynam, however, its prominence of 336 metres (1,102 ft) ranks it as a Marilyn.

A quarry on Lissoughter's southern slopes (the Lissoughter-Derryclare quarry, named after the peak and the neighbouring Derryclare mountain), is a noted source of the green-coloured Connemara marble (sometimes called Connemara Lissoughter Marble). As an isolated standalone peak, it is less frequented by hill-walkers, however, it is regarded for its views of the two ranges and the southern boglands of Connemara.

== Gallery ==
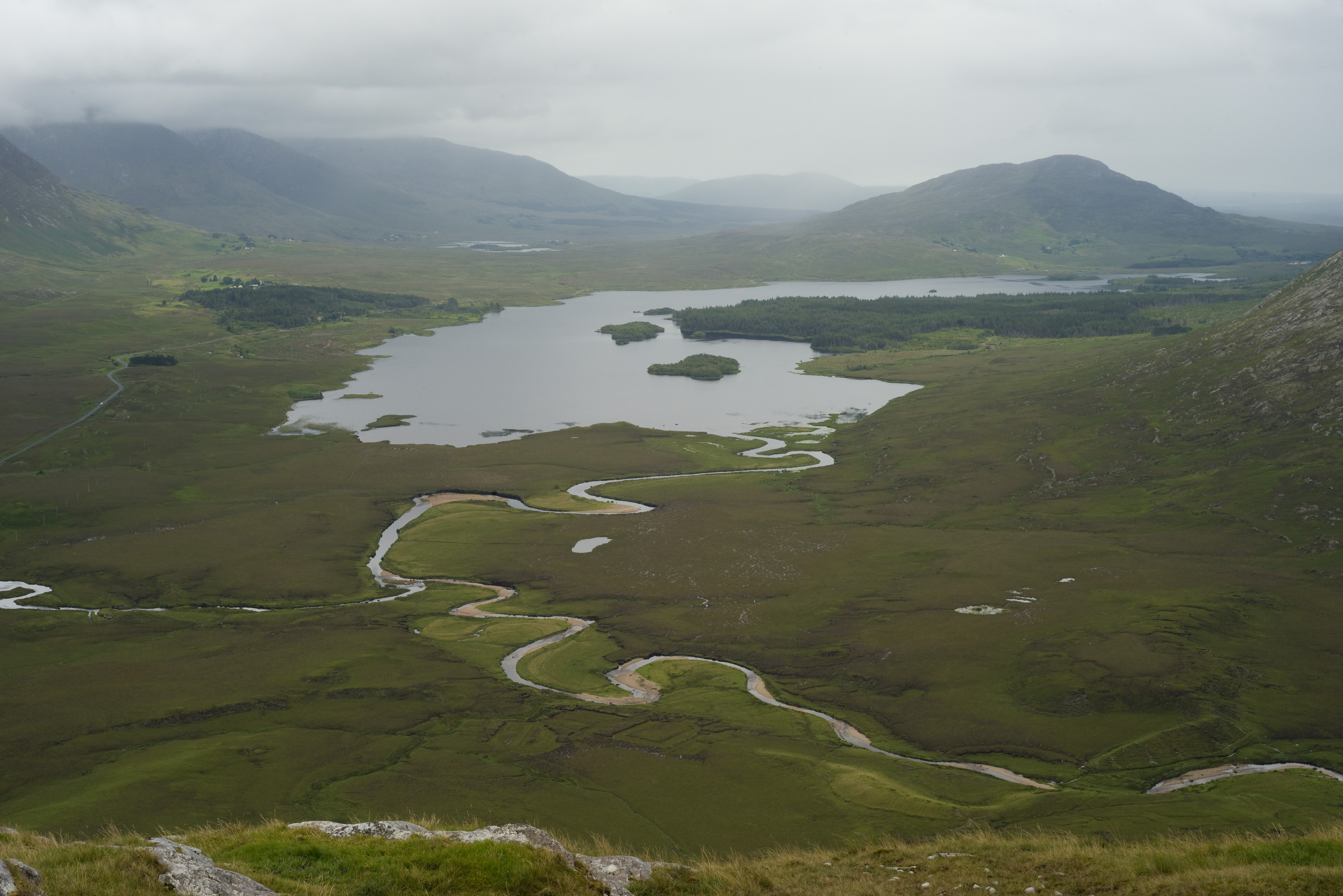
Lough Inagh and Lissoughter (back, right), viewed from Knockpasheemore

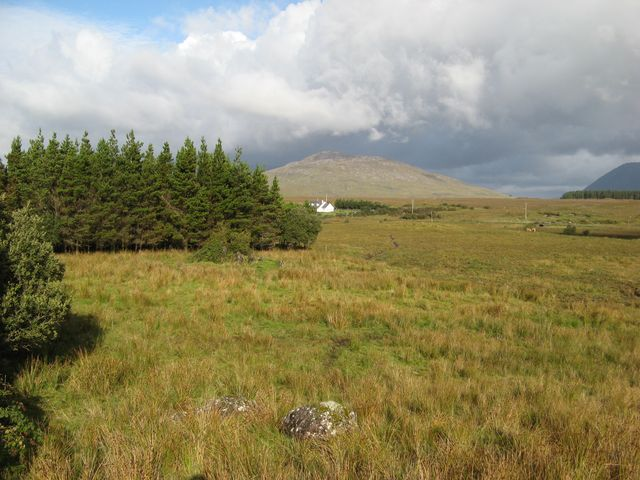
Lissoughter, viewed from forest in Recess, County Galway

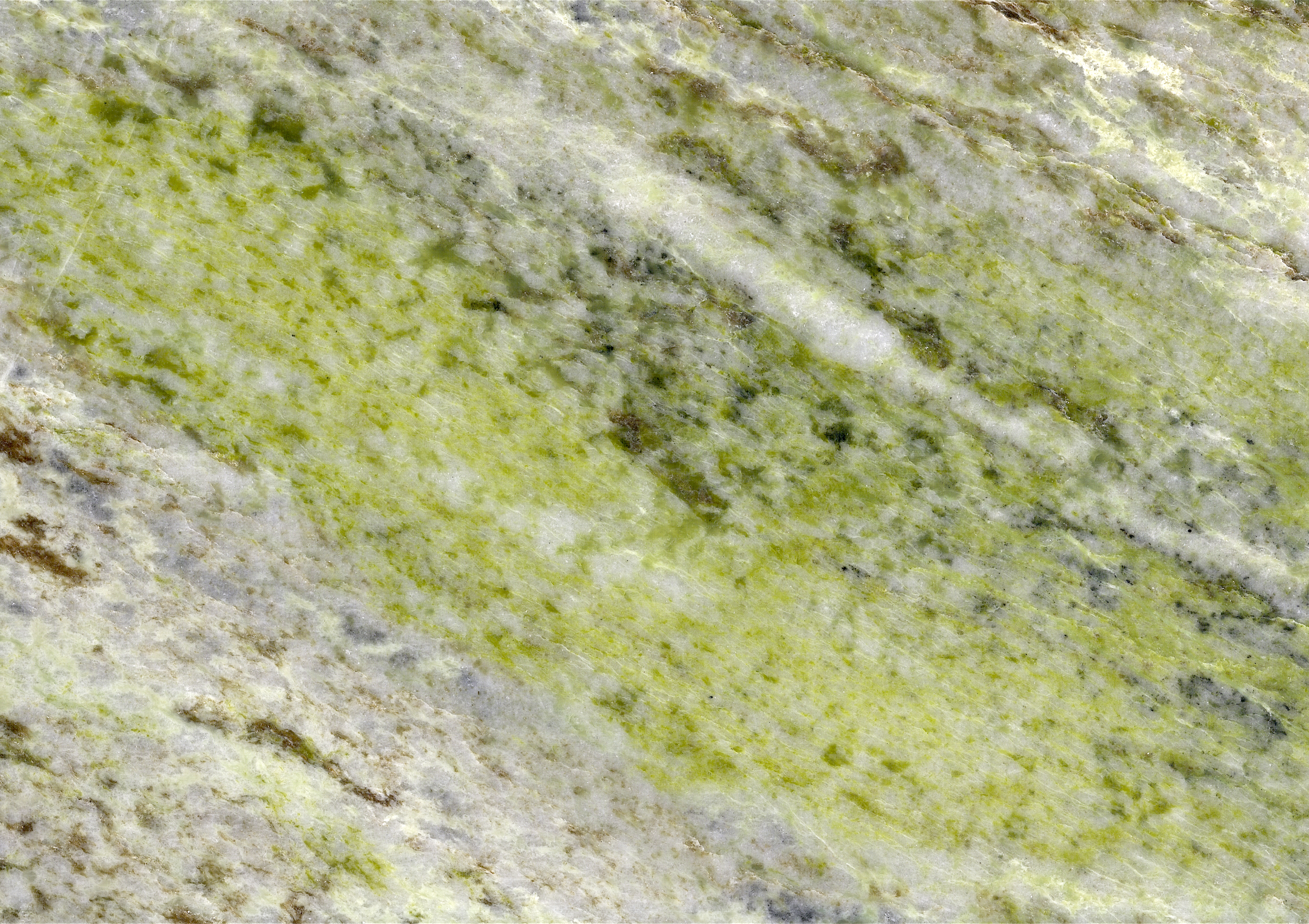
Connemara marble from the Lissoughter quarry.

== Bibliography ==
- MountainViews Online Database (Simon Stewart) (2013). A Guide to Ireland's Mountain Summits: The Vandeleur-Lynams & the Arderins. Collins Books. ISBN 978-1-84889-164-7.
- Tim Robinson (2007). Connemara: Listening to the Wind. Penguin. ISBN 978-1844880669.
- Dillion, Paddy (2001). Connemara: Collins Rambler's guide. Harper Collins. ISBN 978-0002201216.
- Dillion, Paddy (1993). The Mountains of Ireland: A Guide to Walking the Summits. Cicerone. ISBN 978-1852841102.

== See also ==
- Twelve Bens, major range in Connemara
- Maumturks, major range in Connemara
- List of Marilyns in the British Isles
