= Recess, County Galway =

Recess Sraith Salach
- Village
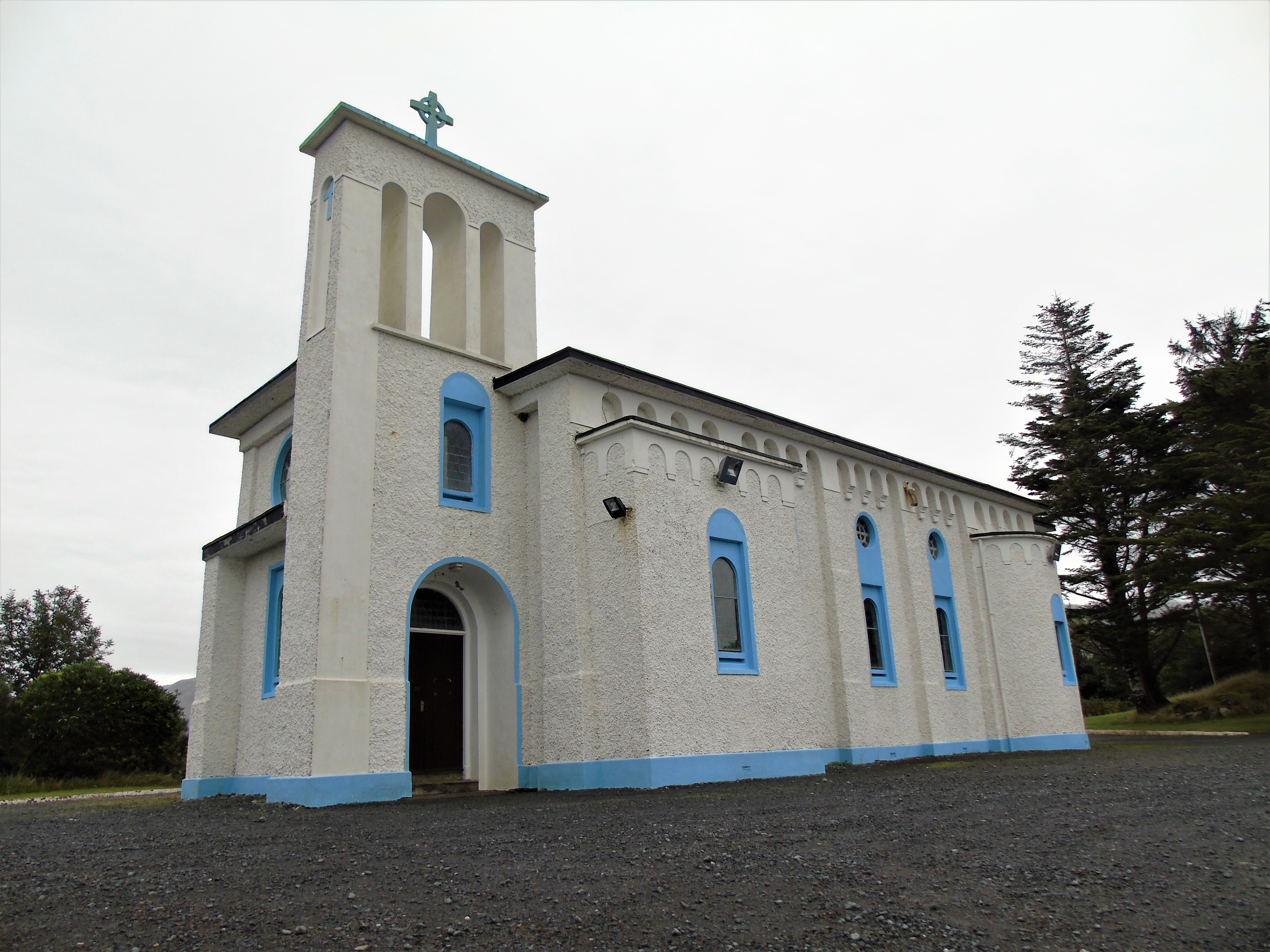
- St Patrick's Chapel, Recess

- Location in Ireland
- Coordinates: 53°28′01″N 9°44′17″W
- Country: Ireland
- Province: Connacht
- County: County Galway
- Elevation: 63 m (207 ft)
- Time zone: UTC+0 (WET)
  - Summer (DST): UTC-1 (IST (WEST))
- Irish Grid Reference: L853477

Recess, officially Sraith Salach (Irish for "river meadow of the willows"), is a village in County Galway, Ireland. It is within the Connemara Gaeltacht (Irish-speaking region), beside Glendollagh Lough, and near the foot of Lissoughter Hill. The N59 road passes through it.

== Transport ==
Recess railway station was on the Galway-Clifden line of the Midland Great Western Railway. The line opened on 1 July 1895 and was closed on 29 April 1935. The railway owned a hotel at Recess. During the Irish Civil War, on 13 October 1922, it was burned down by Republicans (together with nearby Glendalough House) to prevent the National Army from using them as billets.

== People ==
A notable former resident was Seán Lester, the last Secretary General of the League of Nations, who lived there following his retirement until his death in 1959; another was Pádraig MacKernan, a noted Irish diplomat who owned a home at the nearby Lough Athry.

== See also ==
- List of towns and villages in Ireland
