= Thasos (town) =

Thasos Θάσος
- Community
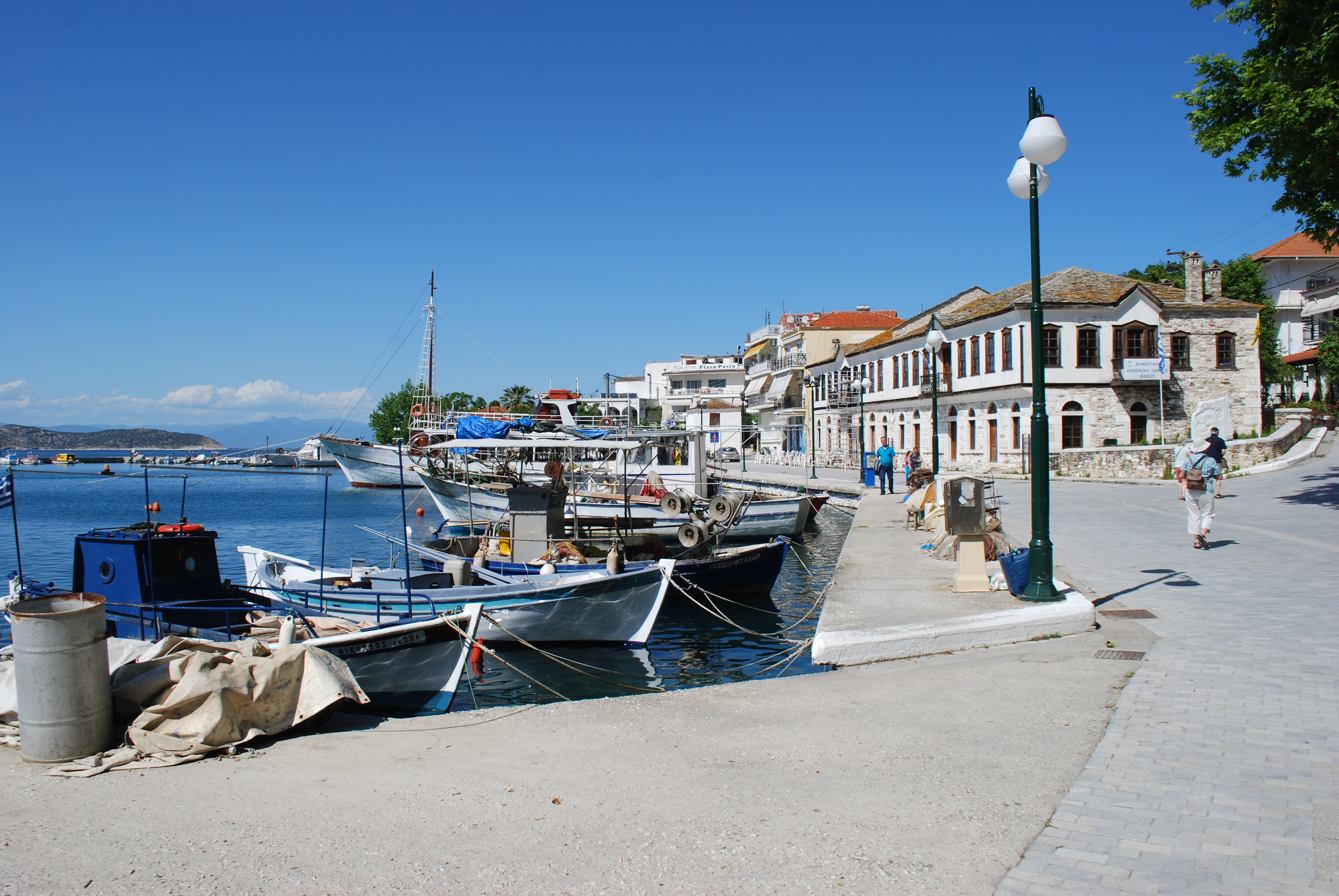
- Promenade

- Location within Greece
- Coordinates: 40°46.5′N 24°42.5′E
- Country: Greece
- Administrative region: East Macedonia and Thrace
- Regional unit: Thasos
- Municipality: Thasos
- Elevation: 5 m (16 ft)

Population (2021)
  - Community: 3,350
- Time zone: UTC+2 (EET)
  - Summer (DST): UTC+3 (EEST)
- Website: www.thassos.gr

Thasos (Greek: Θάσος, Thásos) is a town on the island of Thasos in northern Greece. It is the capital and main town of the island. The town is also called Limenas Thasou or for short just Limenas (Greek: Λιμένας Θάσου, Liménas Thásou, "Harbour of Thasos") to distinguish the town from the island on which it is situated. The town is located on the northeast corner of the island, approximately 17 nautical miles (31 km) south of Kavala.

== History ==
The current town was built west from the ancient town. In and around Thasos, there are many ruins dating from antiquity. Most of the finds from local archaeological sites are on display at the Archaeological Museum of Thasos in Thasos town.

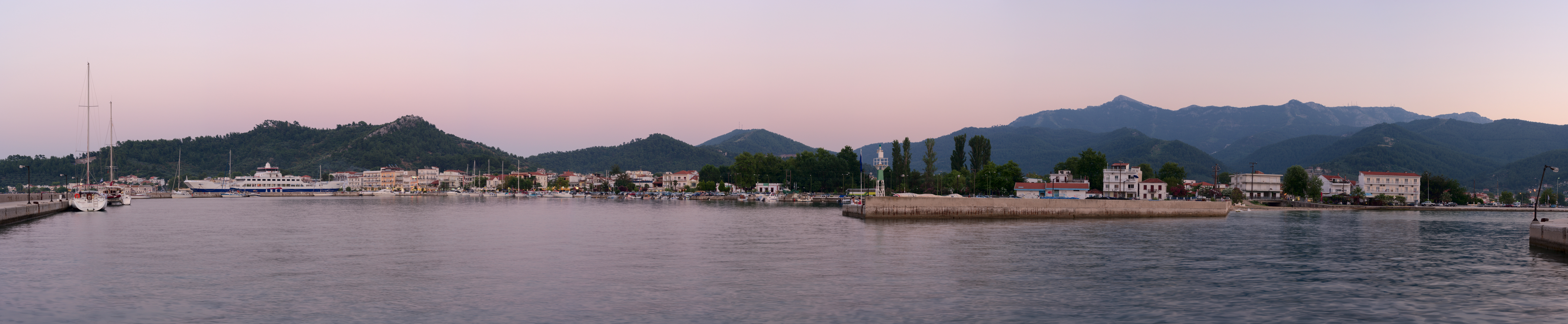
Harbour of Limenas
