= Folklore Museum =

The Folklore Museum is a generic title for a museum of social history, and less often of folklore in the mythic sense. There are many around the world.

== Greece ==
- Folklore Museum of the Aristotle Association
- Folklore Museum of Afytos
- Folklore Museum of Kastoria
- Folklore Museum of Komotini
- Folklore Museum of Limenaria
- Folklore Museum of Velventos
- Folklore Museum of Veroia

== India ==
- Folklore Museum (Mysuru)
- Loktak Folklore Museum

== Jordan ==
- Jordan Folklore Museum

== Malta ==
- Gran Castello Historic House, formerly the Folklore Museum
