= Kastro, Thasos =

Greek village

Coordinates: 40.6700°N 24.6556°E

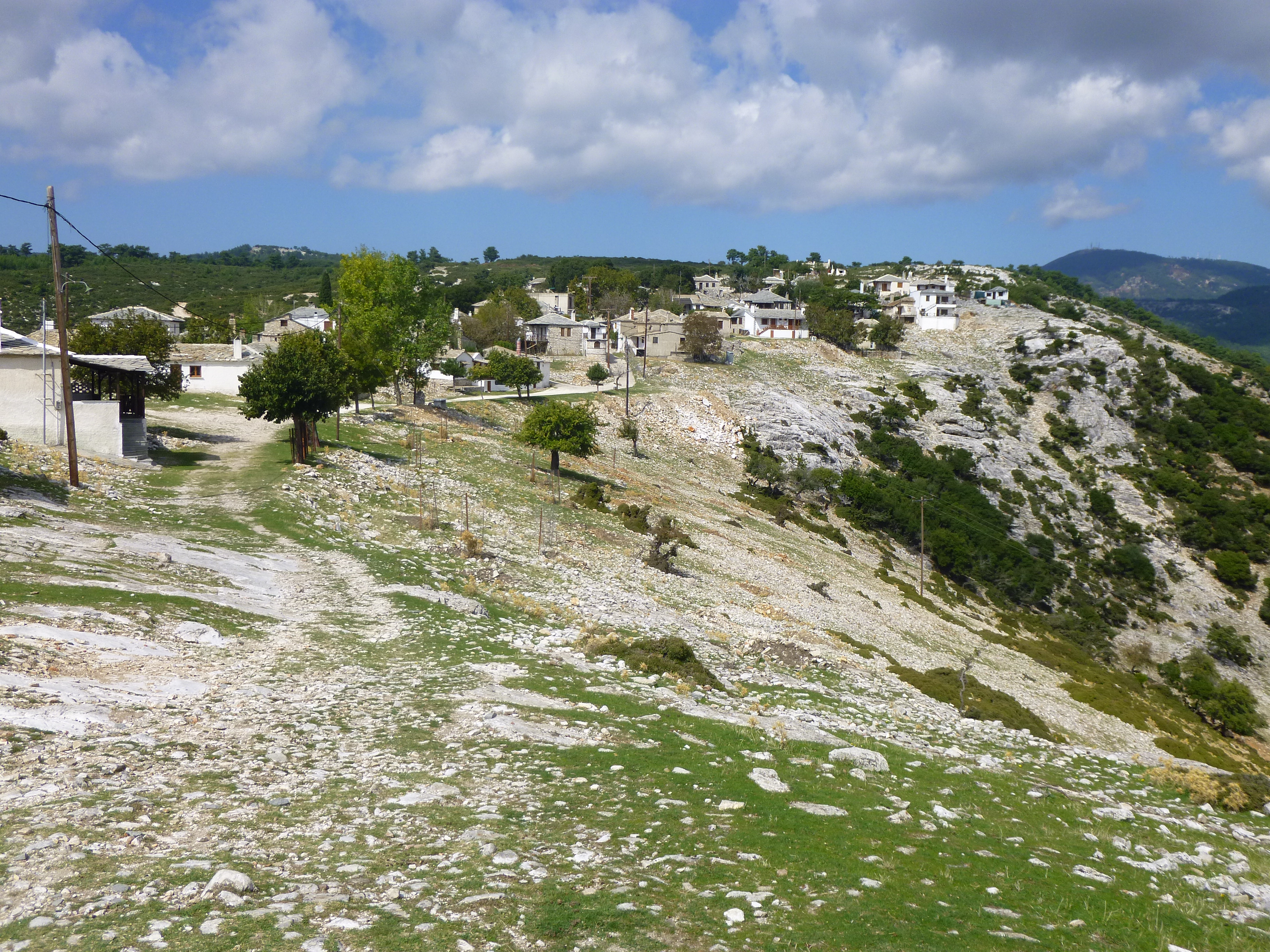
Kastro village seen from his citadel's remains

Kastro (Greek: Κάστρο) is a small village in the interior of the Greek island of Thasos. It is believed to be the oldest village on the island. The village name comes from the old castle that existed here to protect the inhabitants (Kastro means "castle"). The village is located in the centre of the island, at a height of 450–500 m above sea level. It can be reached from Limenaria on an asphalt road or from Theologos on a dirt road.

According to the 2011 census, the population of Kastro was 9. By 2018, it had declined to 1.

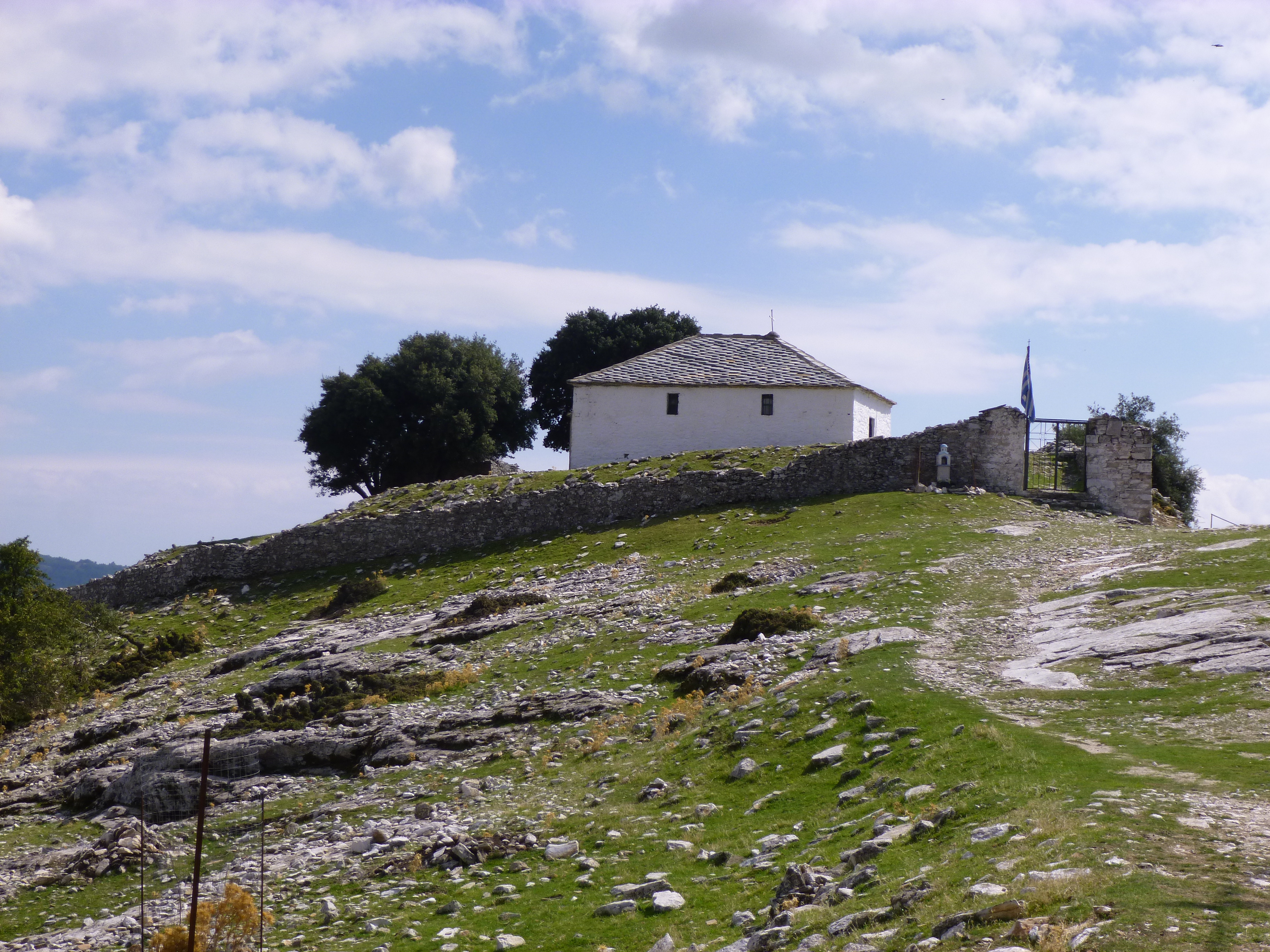
Ruins of the old citadel's wall

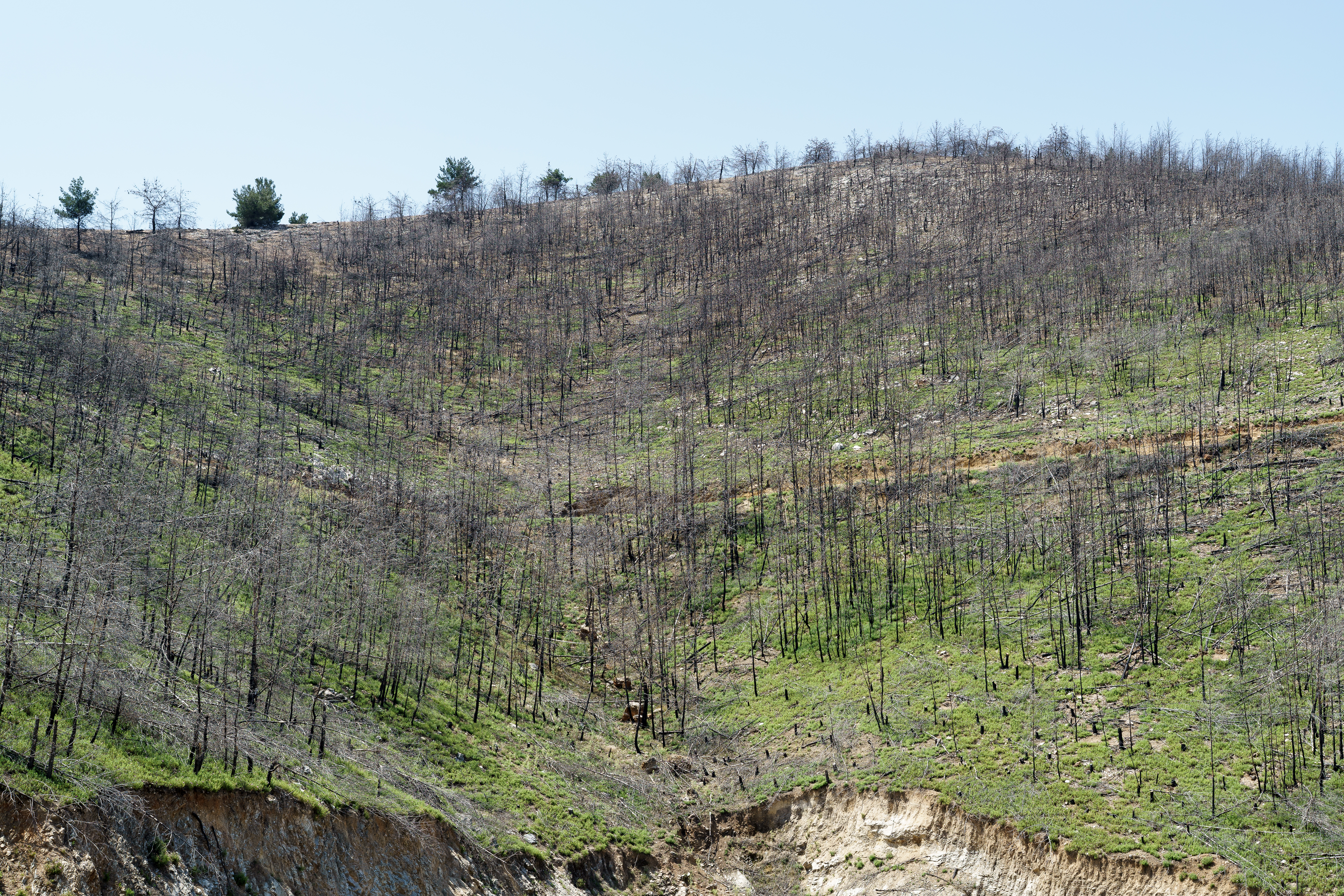
Burned forest near Kastro

== History ==
=== Prehistoric ===
The prehistoric settlement of Kastri is situated in the mountainous hinterland of Thasos, between the villages of Theologos and Potos.

The Late Neolithic II layers (phase Kastri Ib) have been excavated between 1969 and 1980. Many types of decorated pottery have been found, with similarities to Eastern Macedonia “Dimitra type” and the Eastern Balkans. Graphite-painted pottery occurs in large quantities. Pottery has been dated to 4681‑4493 BC Calibrated.

Similar pottery has also been found at Paradeisos (archaeological site) in the region of Eastern Macedonia and Thrace in Northern Greece.

=== Genoese fortress ===
The settlement was first mentioned in 1434 in connection with the establishment of a local fortress or citadel (acropolis) by Umberto Grimaldi, when Thasos was ruled by the Genoese Dorino I Gattilusio. The ruins of the citadel's wall can still be seen. Over the centuries, Kastro, like other mountain villages, was a refuge from pirates. After the fall of Constantinople in 1453 a large number of Greeks came to the island, and most settled in Theologos and Kastro. Under Ottoman administration, the place was known as Yenihisar (New Castle).

Because of its remote and inhospitable location it remained a poor settlement, and in 1856 had only 60 houses.

In the late 19th century, the island's inhabitants started to move from mountain villages to the coast, transforming temporary fishermen's settlements into villages. Inhabitants of Kastro moved to the villages of Kalyvia and Limenaria. A similar thing happened to most mountain villages: Kazaviti (Megalos/Mikros Prinos) has Prinos, Rachoni has Skala Rachoniou, Theologos has Potos, etc. Many names of coastal villages on the island start with "Skala" ("ladder" in Greek), referring to the connection between the mountain village and its coastal village.

== Buildings ==
Since the 1960s many of the buildings in the village have been rebuilt and restored.

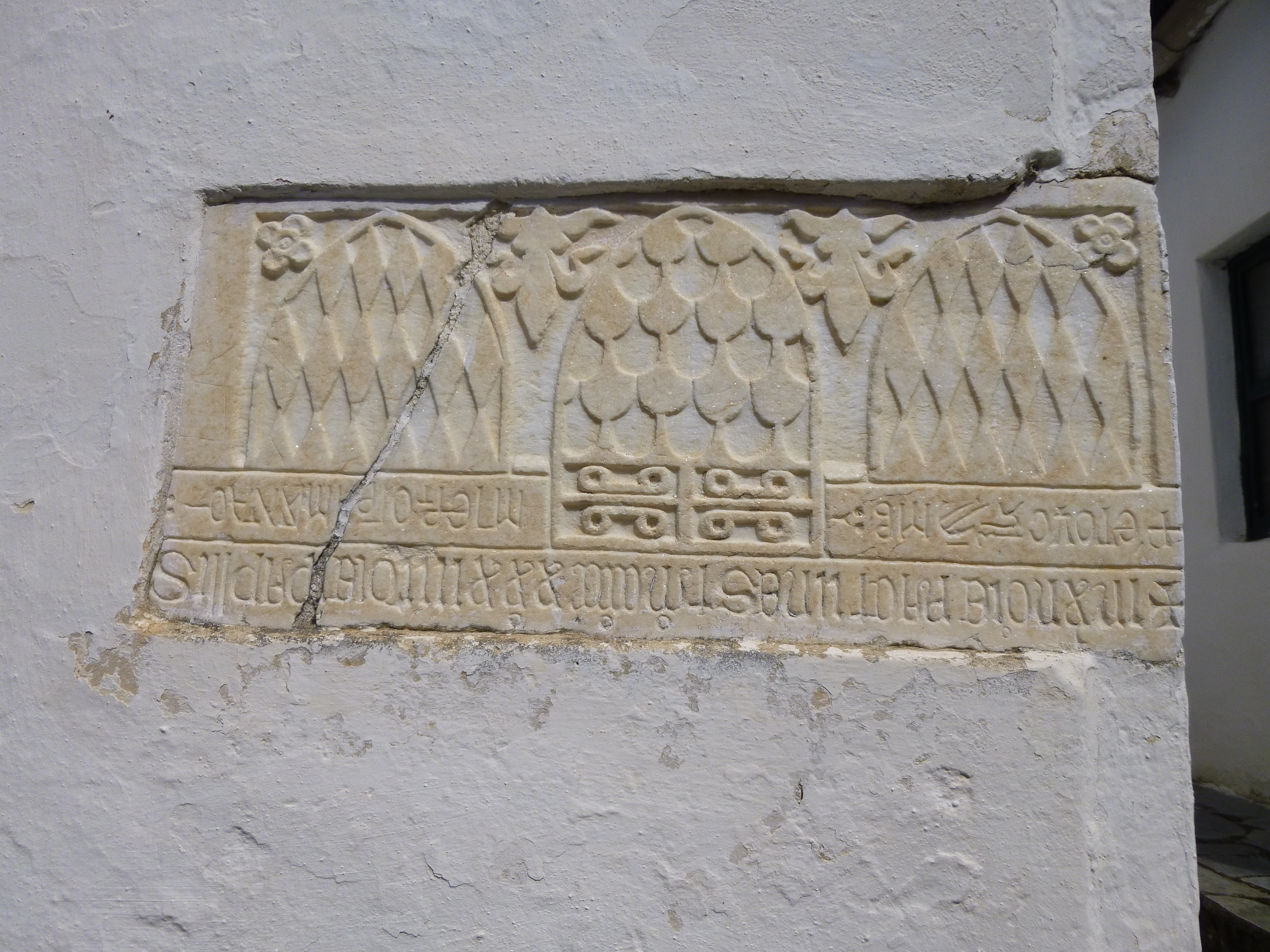
Gattilusio's blazon inserted upside down into one of the church's walls

The village has a small church dedicated to St Athanasius, which has the blazon of Gattilusio on one of the outside walls. The church was built in 1804, within forty days, with the help of all the inhabitants. The stones used to build the church came from the old castle's ruins. Gattilusio's blazon was added to the church's wall, but it was put upside down. In 1980, the church was declared a historical monument, being one of the oldest churches in Thasos.

Every 18 January the church continues to attract people to celebrate the memory of St Athanasius.

On the remains of the old citadel (acropolis) is the village's ossuary, still used to keep skeletal remains of the deceased inhabitants.
