= Pefkari =

Village in Thasos, Greece

Coordinates: 40.618°N 24.598°E

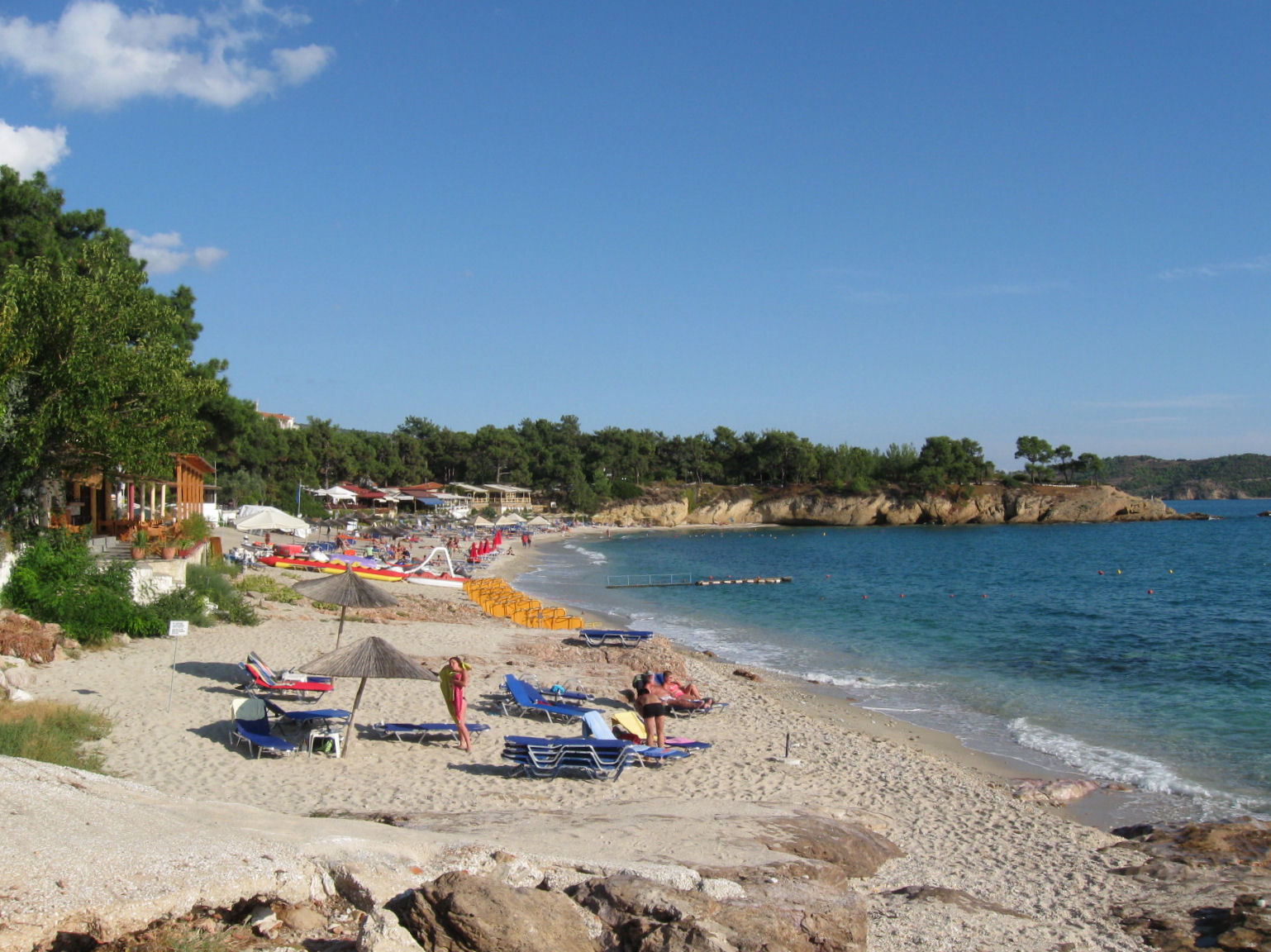
Pefkari in 2008

Pefkari (Greek: Πευκάρι) is a village on the island of Thasos, Greece. It is a popular tourist destination.

Its name means "little pine tree" in the local dialect. It lies on the southern coast of the island, between the villages of Potos and Limenaria.
