= Kalyvia, Thasos =

Village in Thasos, Greece

Coordinates: 40.6384°N 24.5731°E

Kalyvia (Greek: Καλύβια) is a village located in the southwest of Thasos island, approximately 1 km from Limenaria.

The name of the village comes from the Greek word καλύβα, meaning "hut", chosen due to the huts constructed by the Asia Minor refugees and inhabitants coming from Kastro at the beginning of the 20th century.

In 1903, the German company Speidel began exploiting the iron mines of Metallia (near Limenaria). During the mining period, the village experienced great prosperity and expanded considerably.
