= Paradeisos =

Paradeisos may refer to:

- Paradeisos (archaeological site), Late Neolithic site in Greece
- Paradise (2011 film) (Greek: Paradeisos), a Greek film
