= Afytos =

Village in Chalkidiki, Greece

Afytos Άφυτος
- Community
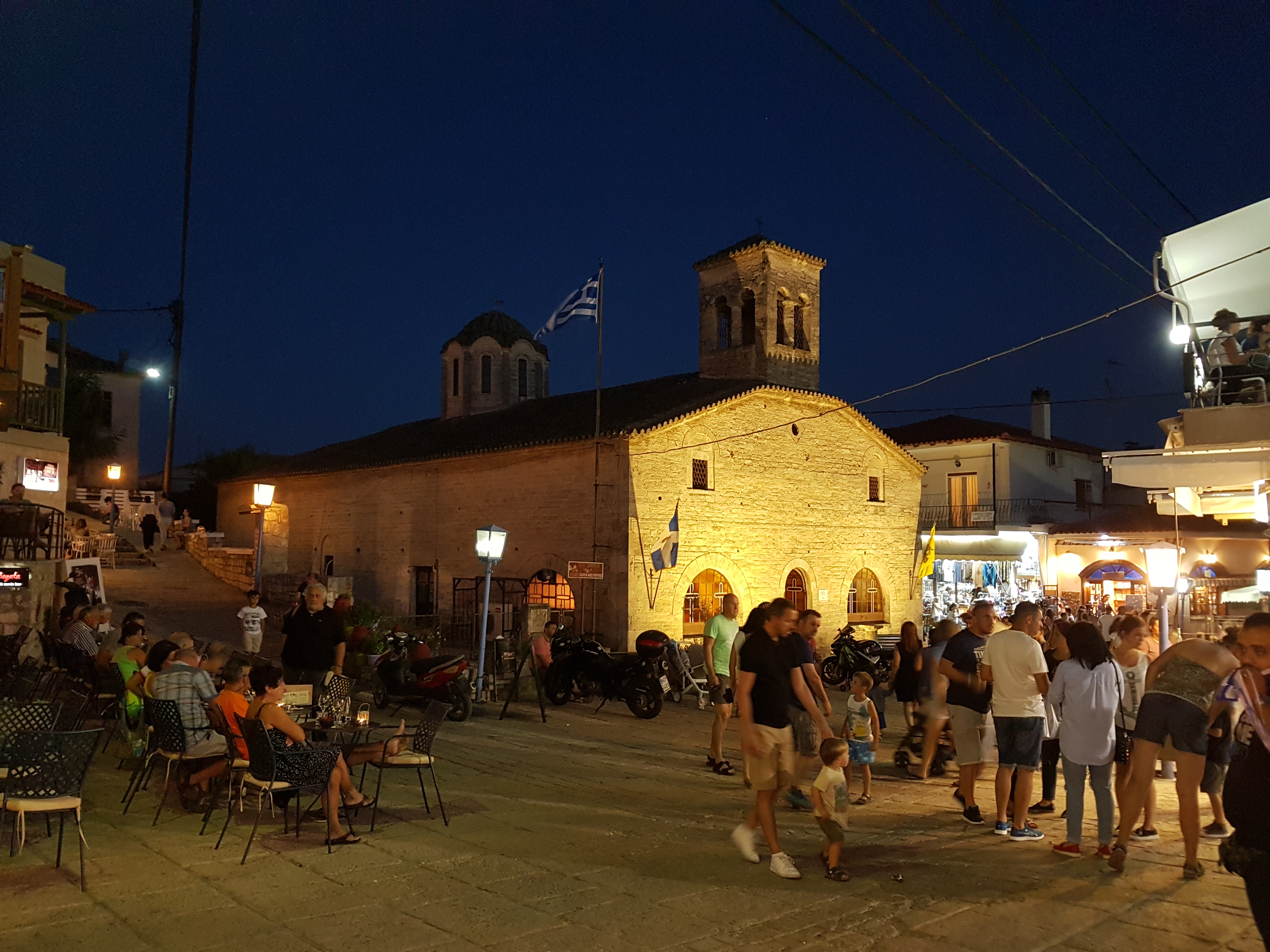
- St Demetrius church

- Location within Greece
- Coordinates: 40°06′00″N 23°26′06″E
- Country: Greece
- Administrative region: Central Macedonia
- Regional unit: Chalkidiki
- Municipality: Kassandra
- Municipal unit: Kassandra

Population (2021)
  - Community: 1,178
- Time zone: UTC+2 (EET)
  - Summer (DST): UTC+3 (EEST)

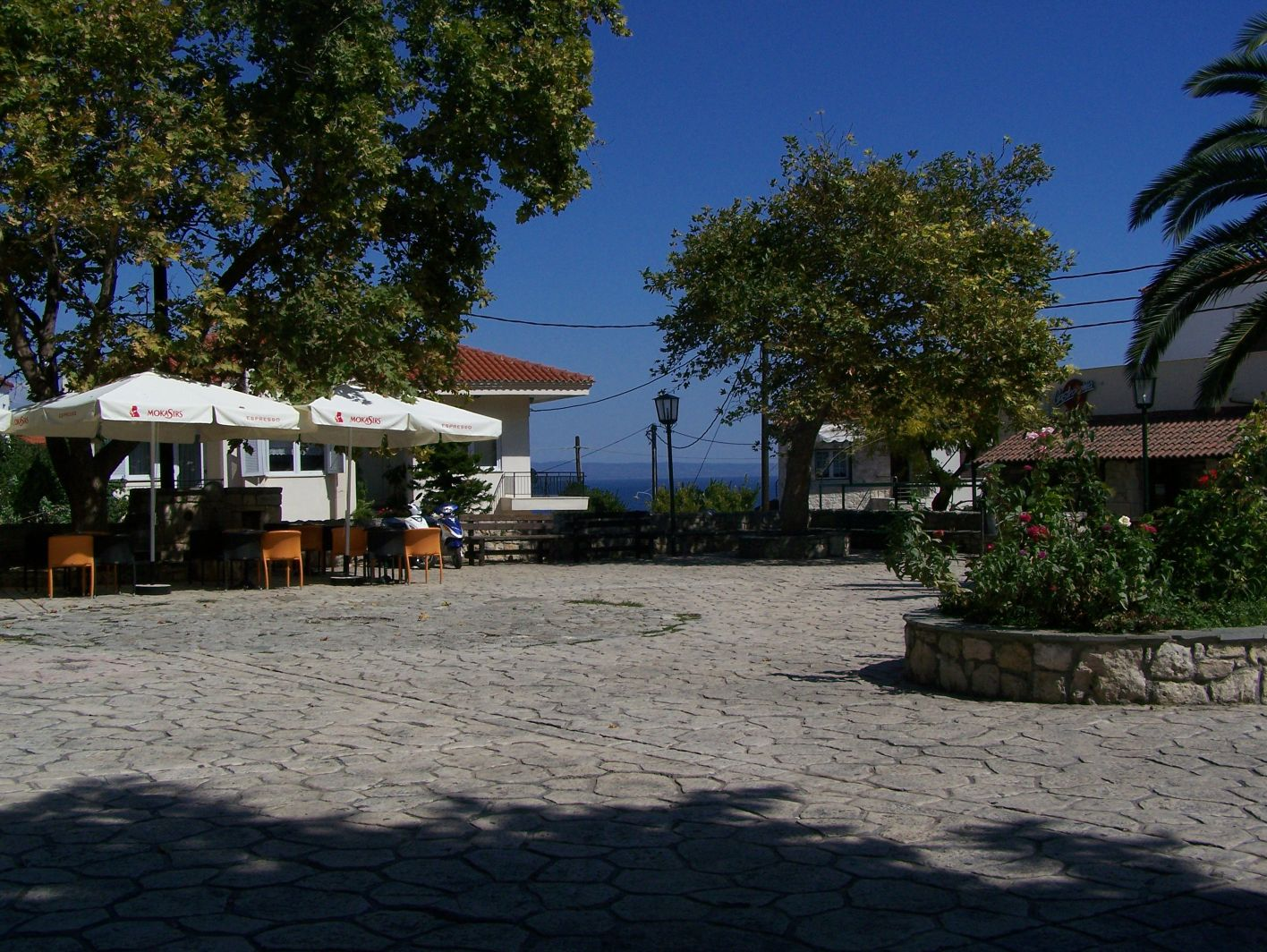
Central Afytos

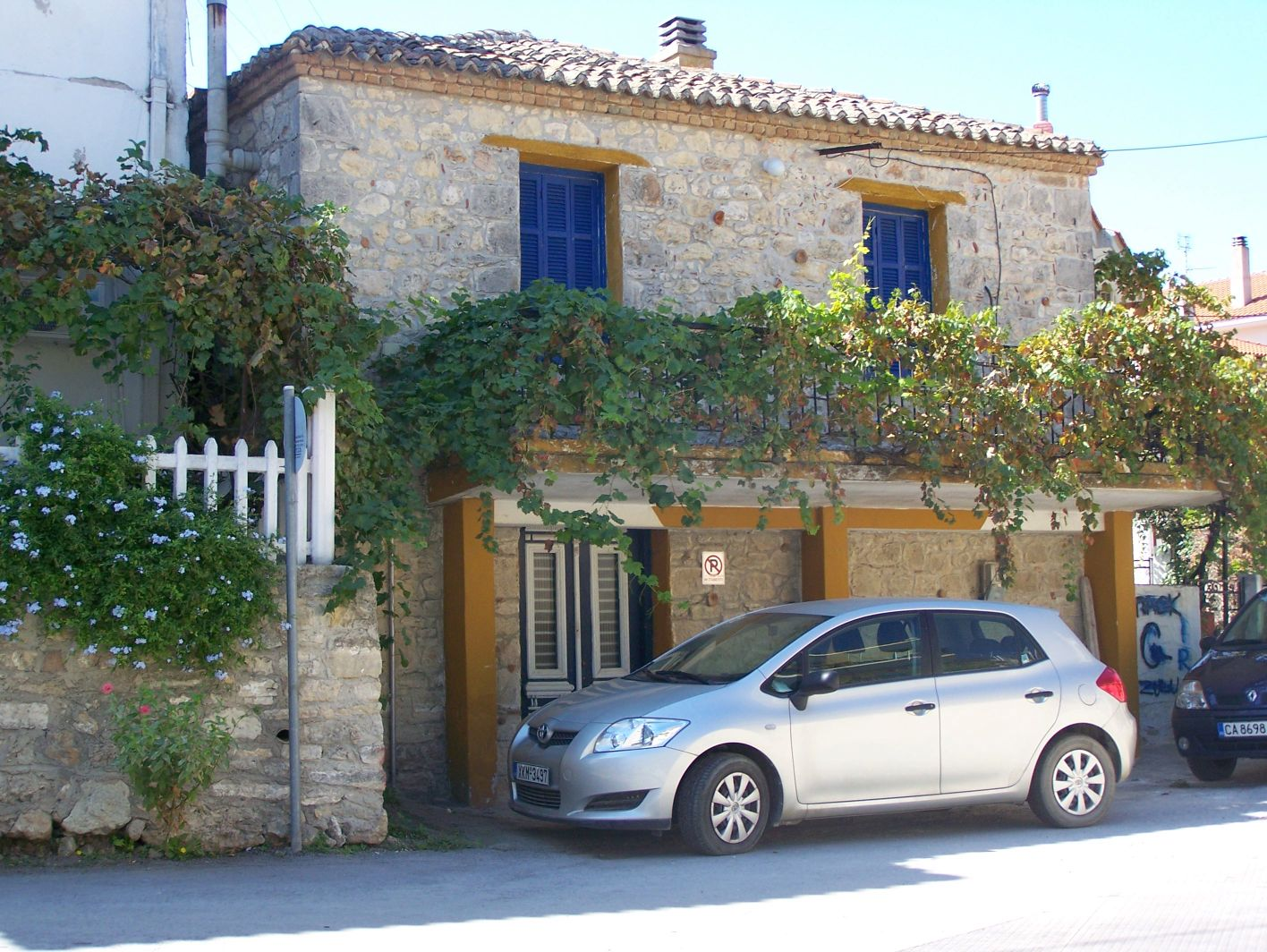
A house

Afytos (Greek: Άφυτος) is a village in Chalkidiki, northern Greece. It is part of the municipality Kassandra. It is situated on the northeastern coast of the Kassandra peninsula, 6 km northeast of Kassandreia, 31 km south of Polygyros and 73 km southeast of Thessaloniki. Its elevation is 50 m. The area around Afytos consists of farmlands in low hills. Its economy is based on agriculture and tourism. Its folklore museum was founded in 1980 by the folklore councillor Nikos Paralis. The town attracts tourists mainly from the surrounding region due to its beaches and local craft markets. The museum is located in the building of the Alevras family. Councils and clubs include the Folklore Friendship Council and Afytos Tradition.

== Population ==
Year	Population
1991	838
2001	1,227
2011	1,273
2021	1,178

Afytos is particularly known for its well-preserved traditional architecture, featuring stone-built houses, narrow streets, and scenic viewpoints overlooking the Toroneos Gulf. The village has maintained its historical character, with several restored buildings now used as guesthouses, cafes, and cultural spaces.

== History ==
Ancient Aphytis was an important town, belonging to Pallene. Its fleet participated in the Persian Wars. The town declined, and was not mentioned again until the 14th century. During the Greek War of Independence, many revolutionaries came from the village, including Triantafyllos Garoufallou, Georgios Panagiotou and Anastassios Kiriazis. Tourism rose after World War II.

== Sources ==
- Tourist Directory, Central and Western Macedonia, Explorer, 2003
