= Folklore Museum of Limenaria =

Limenaria's Folklore Museum

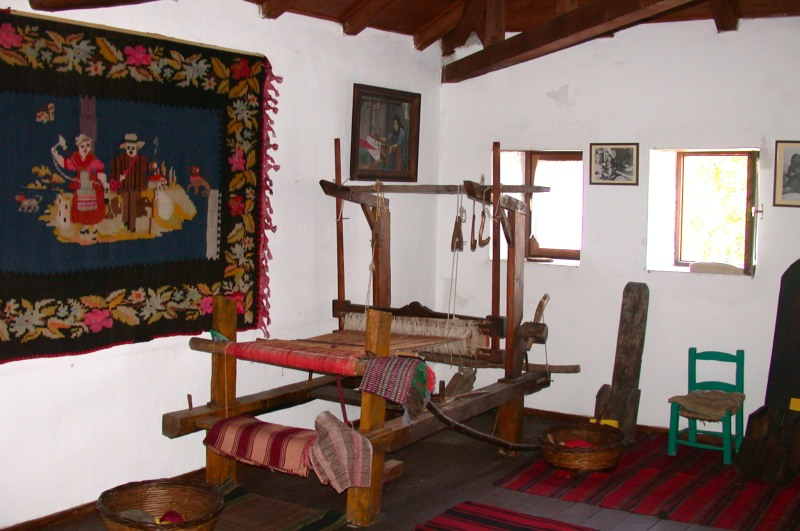
- The traditional loom

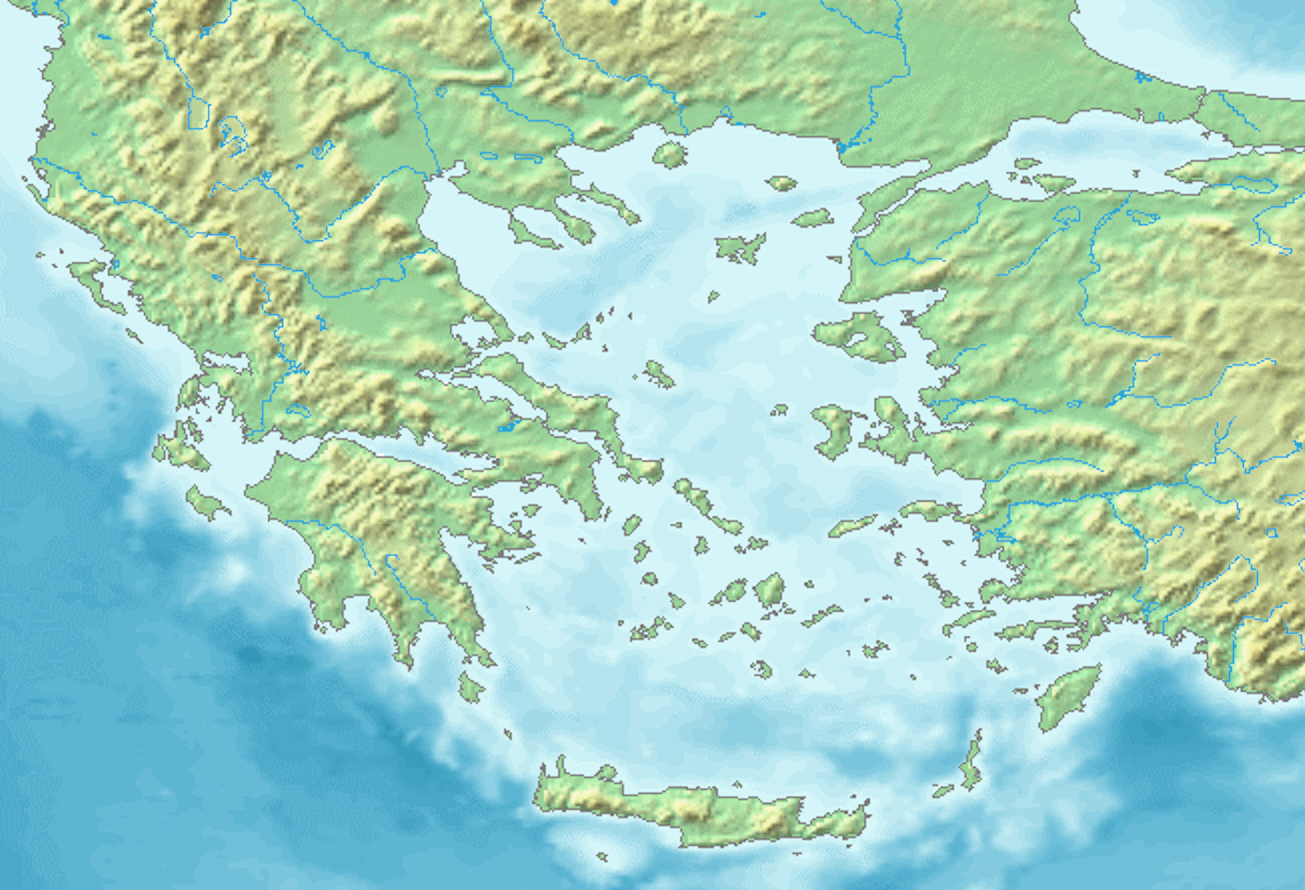
- Location within Aegean Sea Location within Greece
- Established: 1993
- Location: Limenaria, Thasos, Greece
- Coordinates: 40°37′31″N 24°34′53″E

The folklore museum in Limenaria, Thasos, a Greek island, was established in 1993 by To Kastro (The Castle), the Limenaria cultural association. It is housed in the former community office in the centre of the village. Limenaria is a village in the south of Thasos, 40 km from the main town, Limenas.

== Exposition ==
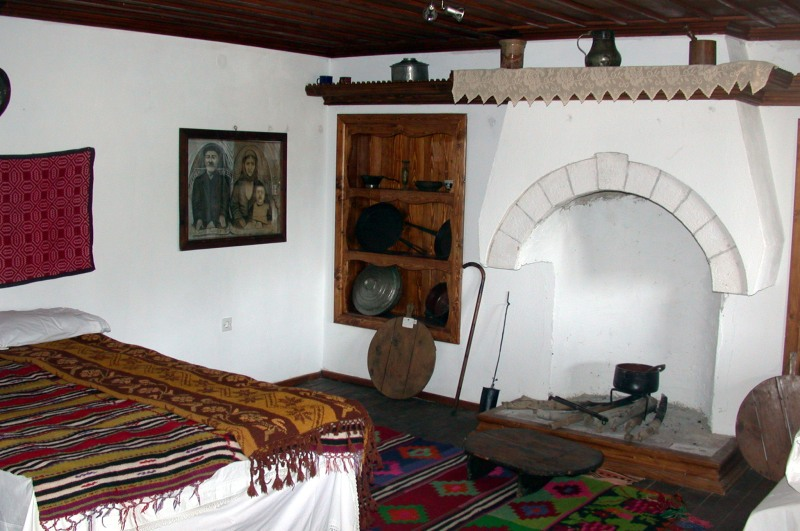
Couple's chamber with fireplace and bed

The purpose of the museum is to preserve and promote the local tradition. It therefore displays household artifacts and clothing (embroidery, woven fabrics, traditional costumes, stoves, a loom and its accoutrements, coffee-making equipment), tools of various trades (tailoring, barbering, woodcutting, bee-keeping, hunting, a shoemakers and a cobblers bench, tools for collecting and transporting resin, a raki still, tools for collecting olives), and tools from the time when the local mines opened. The museum also displays Mr Kyprianos Georgiadis‘ private collection of books and stationery.

== Sources ==
- This article incorporates text from the corresponding article at the Museums of Macedonia website, commissioned by the Macedonian Heritage foundation, written by Vlasis Vlasidis, and published under a CC-BY-SA-3.0 license.
