= Folklore Museum of Komotini =

Museum in Komotini, Greece

Coordinates: 41°6′57.5″N 25°24′17.5″E

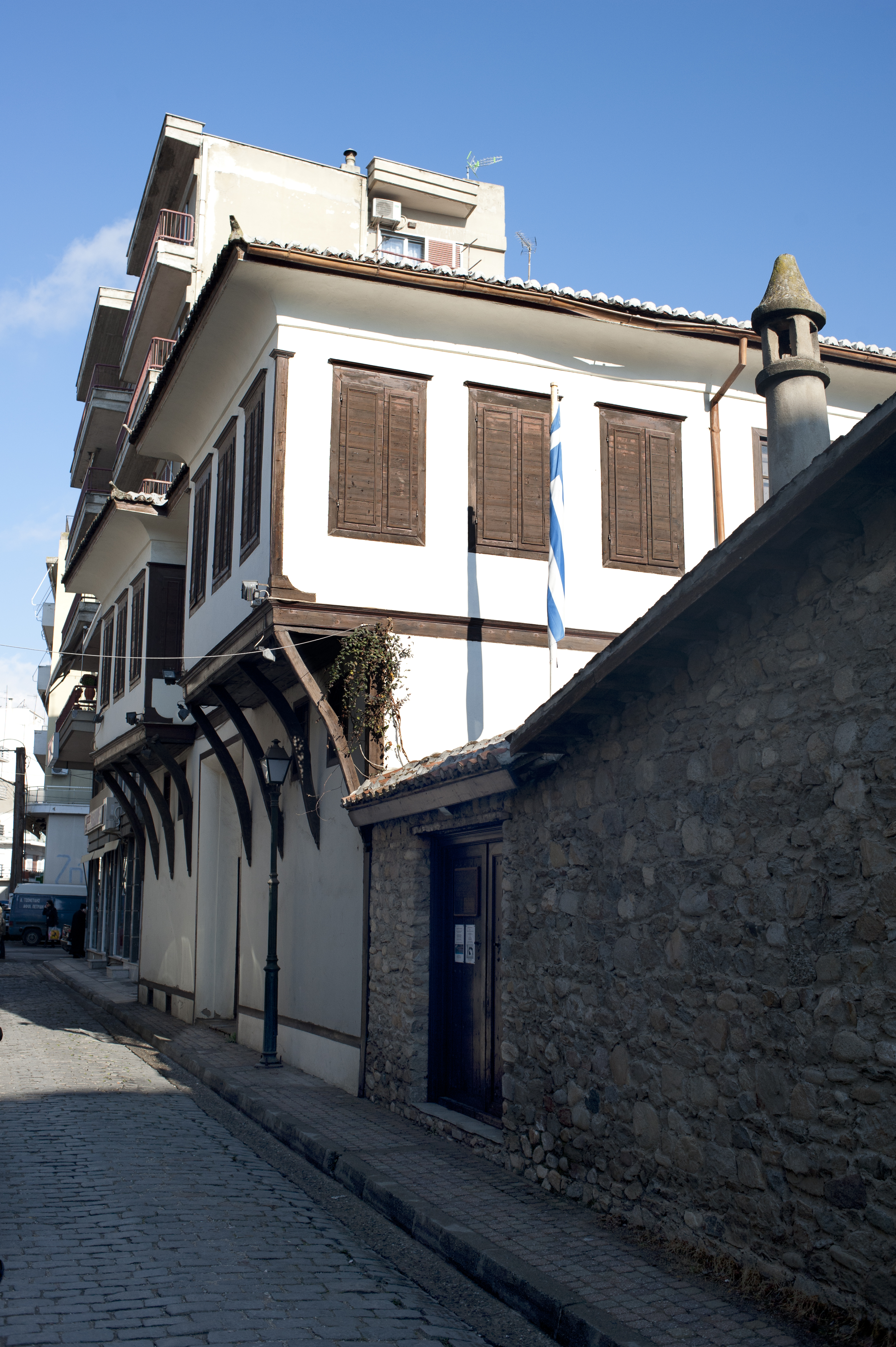
Folklore Museum Komotini

The Folklore Museum of Komotini (Greek: Λαογραφικό Μουσείο Κομοτηνής, Laografikó Mouseío Komotinís) is a museum in Komotini in Greece. It was founded in 1962 and since 1989, it is housed in the Peidis Mansion, itself a restored sample of local traditional architecture. The collection is displayed in the mansion's two floors, in the cellar and under a roofed part of the courtyard. It includes dresses, lace, handwork of various materials and tools of agricultural life and of other traditional professions. The collection also includes personal items of the Archbishop of Athens Chrysanthos, who was born in Komotini, as well as other icons and ecclesiastical items.
