= Folklore Museum of Afytos =

- Λαογραφικό Μουσείο Αφύτου
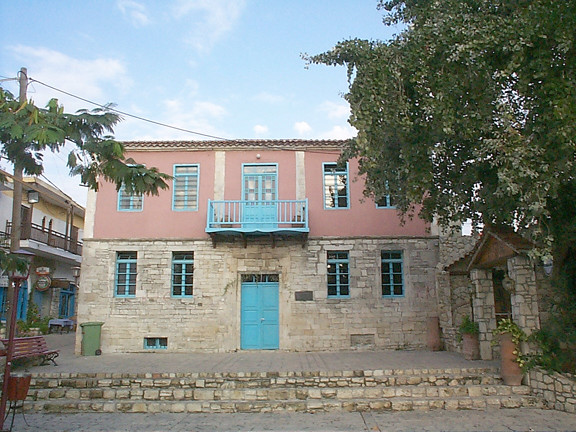
- Outside view
- Established: 1980s
- Location: Afytos, Greece
- Coordinates: 40.09988458851584°N 23.436934481999835°E
- Type: Art museum
- Founders: Nikos Paralis, Folklore Association of Chalkidiki

The Folklore Museum of Afytos is located in the seaside village of Afytos on the Kassandra peninsula of Chalkidiki, Central Macedonia, Greece.

== History ==
The museum was established in the 1980s by Nikos Paralis and the local Folklore Association using artifacts donated by the villagers. The museum was housed in a traditional listed building dating to 1889 in the centre of the village, which was donated by the Aletras family.

== Exhibits ==
The folklore collection includes domestic utensils, agricultural implements (for ploughing, sowing, reaping, harvesting), and pottery, which is a craft with a long tradition here. The folklore collection is accompanied by a collection of Karagiozis shadow-theatre puppets owned by the puppet-master Evgenios Spatharis.

== Gallery ==
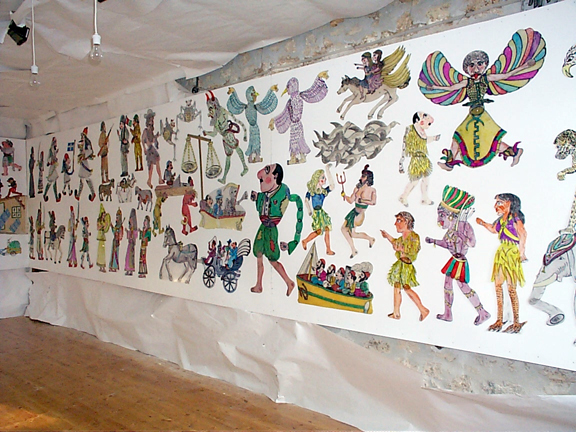
Spatharis Shadow Theatre Puppet Exhibition

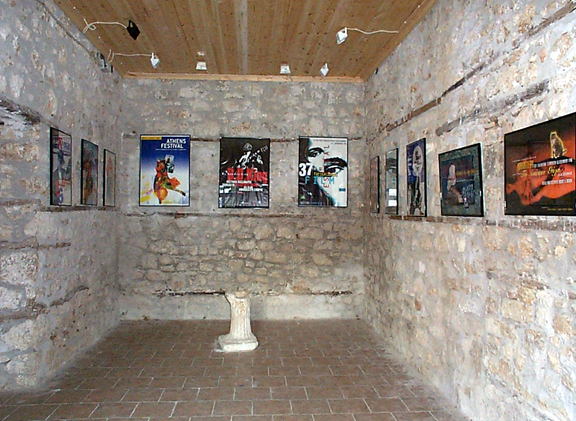
Arvanitis Photographic Exhibition 1st

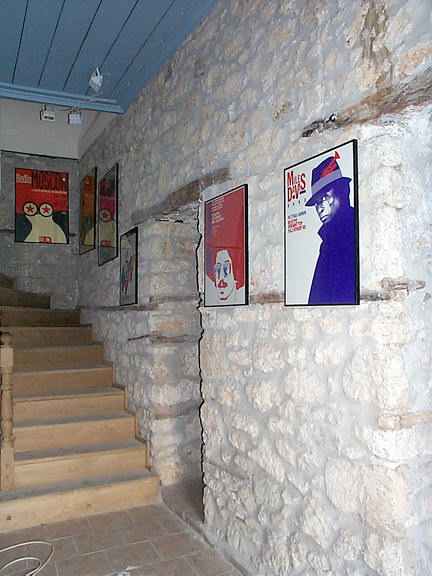
Arvanitis Photographic Exhibition 2nd
