= Folklore Museum of Kastoria =

- Λαογραφικό Μουσείο Καστοριάς
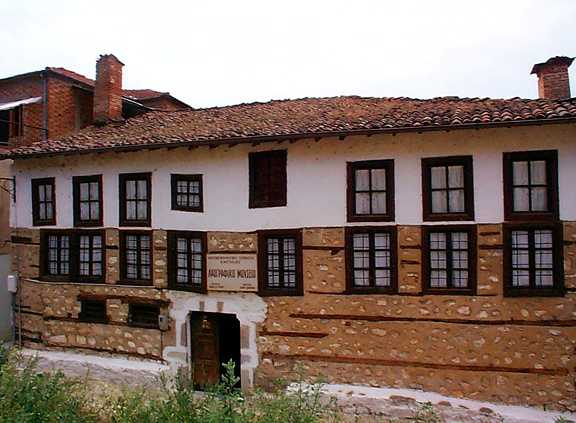
- Outside view
- Established: 1972
- Location: Kastoria, Macedonia, Greece
- Coordinates: 40.517210983824654°N 21.273412206840742°E
- Type: Art museum

The Folklore Museum of Kastoria (Greek: Λαογραφικό Μουσείο Καστοριάς) also known as Folklore Museum “Nerantzis-Aivazis” (Λαογραφικό Μουσείο “Νεράντζη–Αϊβάζη”), located in Kastoria, Macedonia, Greece, is housed in one of the city's oldest mansions, the Nerantzis-Aivazis residence near the lake, at 10 Kapetan Lazou Street. The museum has been operating since 1972, and is run by Harmony (a music and literary society). The two-storey premises were built between the 16th and 17th centuries, and survived in such good condition that the museum was able to open without restoration. All the original furniture is still present.

== Exhibits ==
On the ground floor, there are three cellars: the wine cellar contains the wine press, wine barrels and baskets for the grapes; another stored pickles, oil, olives, preserves, butter, and cheese, and the third contained cereals, pulses and flour. In the latter, pies and bread were made. Wood and coal for heating were also kept on the ground floor. In the courtyard are a well, a boat shelter and a kitchen.

There are two family living rooms on the first floor (one each for summer and winter), the former also used as a fur workshop. It has the first sewing machine for furs (which came from France in 1884). On the second floor are two bedrooms (one for husband and wife and the other for the children) and two sitting-rooms, one small and the other large (the main reception room, used on festivals and holidays). It contains a suite of furniture (with traditional places for the hosts, the metropolitan bishop and Turkish dignitaries); in the alcove are low tables for other guests. Above the bedrooms is a balcony, from which unmarried women could observe ceremonies and celebrations in the house. On this floor there is also a lavatory with a secret exit passageway, useful in emergencies.

== Gallery ==
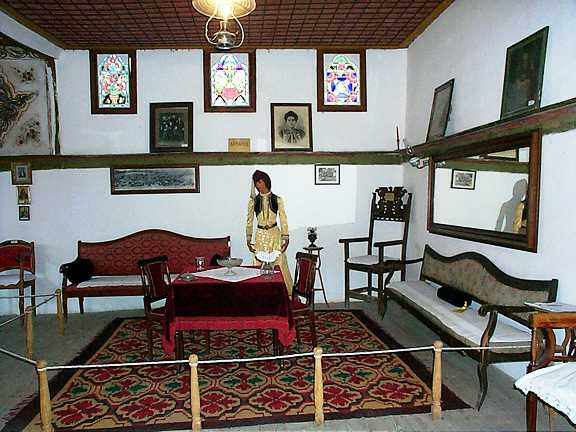
Main reception room

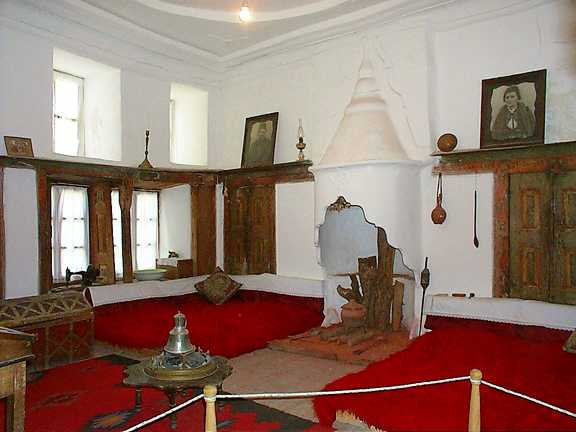
Main bedroom

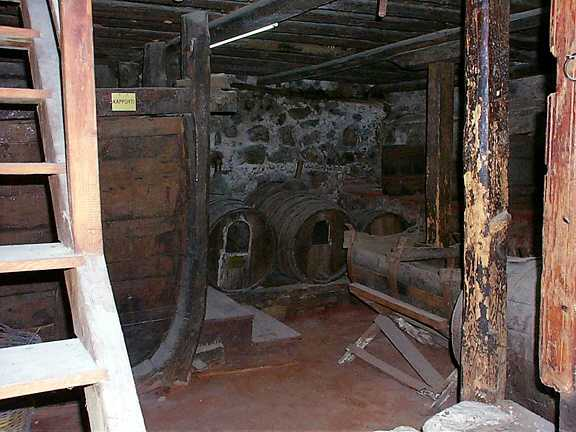
Wine cellar

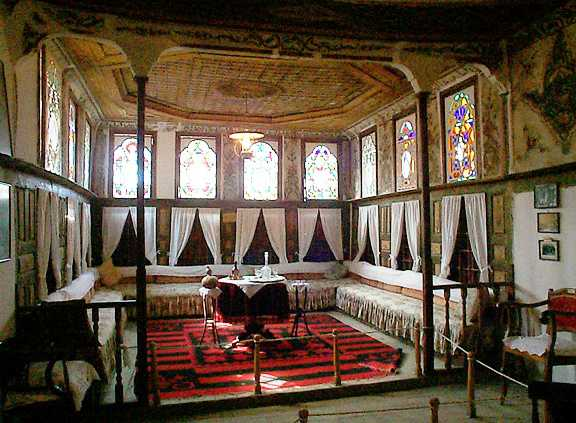
Kiosk

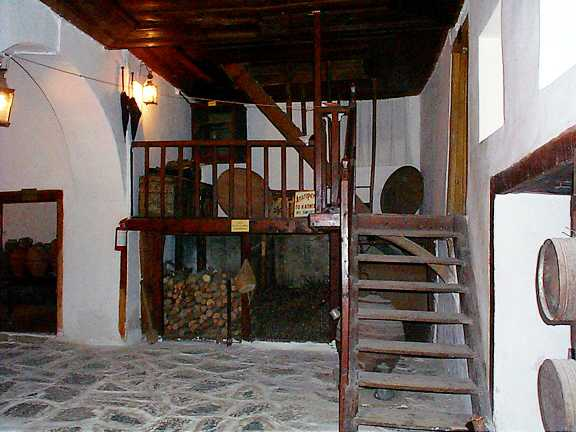
Ground floor
