= Potos, Thasos =

Potos Ποτός
- Settlement
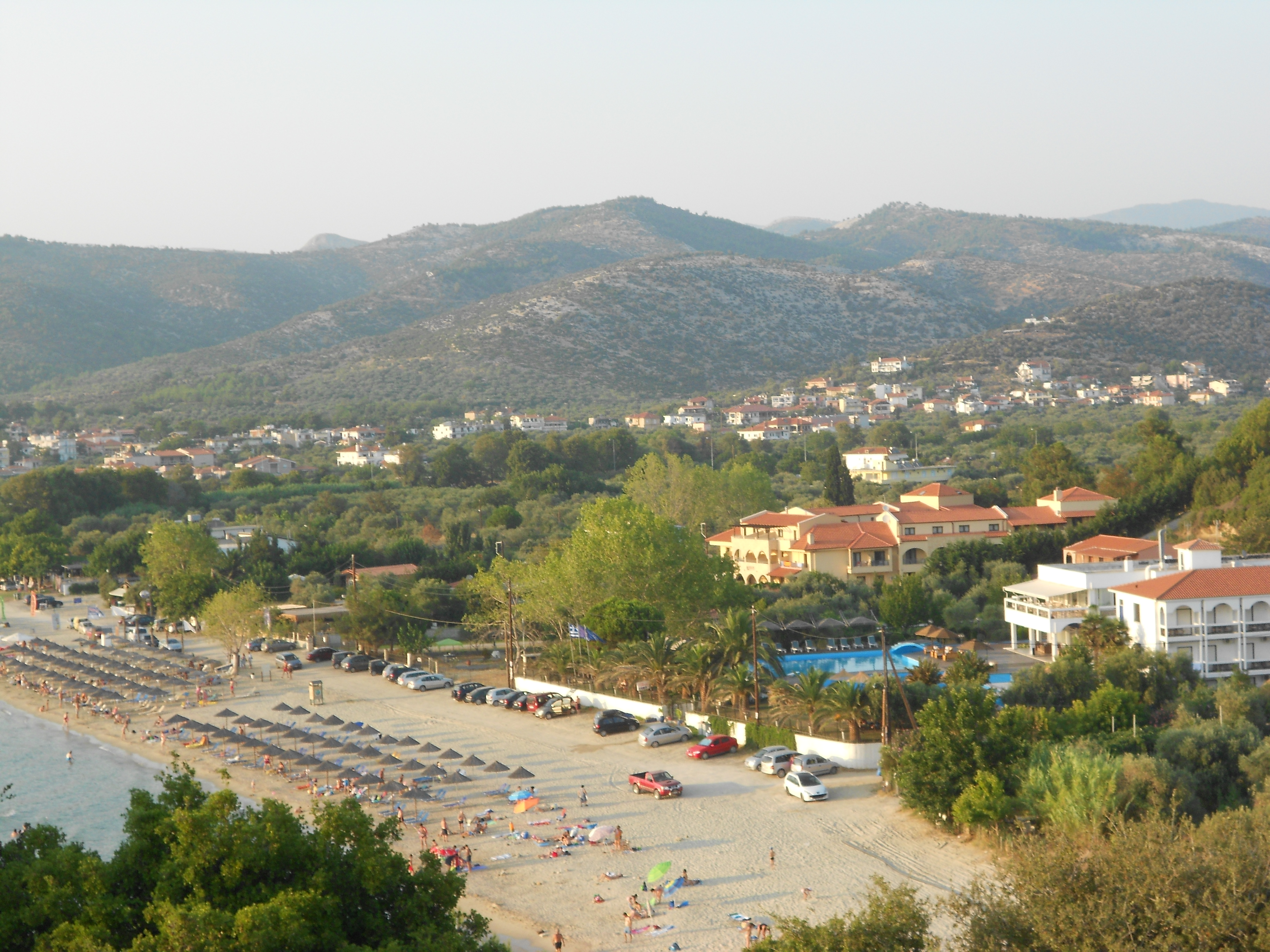
- Seafront in Potos

- Location within Greece
- Coordinates: 40°37′N 24°37′E
- Country: Greece
- Administrative region: East Macedonia and Thrace
- Regional unit: Thasos
- Municipality: Thasos
- Community: Theologos
- Elevation: 5 m (16 ft)

Population (2021)
  - Total: 788
- Time zone: UTC+2 (EET)
  - Summer (DST): UTC+3 (EEST)
- Website: www.thassos.gr

Potos (Greek: Ποτός) is a village on the island of Thasos in northern Greece. The village is located in the south of the island, on the coast of the Thracian Sea (the northernmost part of the Aegean Sea) with a population of 788 residents (as of 2021). The seaside village is a popular tourist resort in the July-August Summer season, where tourism provides a large proportion of the income, alongside fishing and marble exploitation.
