= Paradeisos (archaeological site) =

Location in Eastern Macedonia and Thrace

Coordinates: 41°03′57.6″N 24°45′16.6″E

Paradeisos (archaeological site) (Greece)

Paradeisos is an archaeological site located in the region of Eastern Macedonia and Thrace in Northern Greece, on a flat hilltop at the west bank of the river Nestos. The site is known today as 'Klisi Tepe', named after the ruins of a Byzantine church, and archaeological excavations were started by the Swedish Institute at Athens in 1975. To the north are the Rhodope Mountains, while to the south the river Nestos has created a large plain, that extends 30 km towards the Aegean Sea. The settlement was probably located closer to the coastline, which has since expanded. The Via Egnatia, the Roman road connecting Durrës and Constantinople have crossed the river Nestos here at least since Hellenistic times (possibly following an earlier road).

== History of excavations ==
The archaeologist Rainer Felsch first encountered the site in 1972 and noted surface finds indicating the presence of human activity from the Late Neolithic period to the Bronze Age. Swedish archaeologists Erik J. Holmberg and Pontus Hellström travelled through the area of Paradeisos searching of potential excavation sites in 1975. Holmberg and Hellström had a special interest in the Late Bronze Age and believed Paradeisos to be the most promising site for this research. Excavations were conducted on this site in 1976 between September and October. Five small trenches were opened during the campaign with finding of approximately 400 kg of pottery and several figurines from the late Neolithic period. Holmberg and Hellström's original focus were on the Bronze Age in the region. However, it soon became clear that the remains at Paradeisos was mostly from the Late Neolithic period.

== Description of the ancient remains ==
During the fieldwork the primary find category was graphite painted pottery from the Late Neolithic period. The pottery consisted mostly of decorated bowls, jars with handles and large plates. In terms of decoration only the graphite ware was well preserved enough to show visible forms of patterns, which included lines, chevron patterns and triangular shaped eyes.

Similar graphite painted pottery has also been found at Kastro, Thasos, also known as Kastri. Thasos is a Greek island in the northern Aegean Sea.

Figurines discovered were all from Late Neolithic layers. Four of the figurines depicted humans and three represented animals. Another three fragments of figurines could not be identified. The human faces found vary in shape from oval or conical to a flat head with pierced ears. The animal figurines depict what may be a bear or a dog. The finds from the excavation are currently being stored in the Archaeological Museum of Kavala.

== See also ==
- Swedish Institute at Athens

== Sources ==
- Hellström, P. (ed.) 1987. Paradeisos. A Late Neolithic settlement in Aegean Thrace (Medelhavsmuseet Memoir 7), Stockholm.
- Swedish Institute at Athens - Paradeisos, Thrace: https://www.sia.gr/en/articles.php?tid=364&page=1
