= Folklore Museum of Velventos =

- Λαογραφικό Μουσείο Βελβεντού
- Location within Greece
- Established: 29 May 2006
- Location: Velventos, Western Macedonia, Greece
- Coordinates: 40.2558°N 22.0706°E
- Type: Folk art museum

The Folklore Museum of Velventos (Greek: Λαογραφικό Μουσείο Βελβεντού) is a folk museum in Velventos, Western Macedonia. It is devoted to the folklore and domestic culture of the western Macedonia region of Greece in the recent pre-industrial past.

== Foundation ==
The museum was established in late May 2006, under the direction of the Department of Art History and Museology at the Aristotle University of Thessaloniki. (Note: Not to be confused with the Folklore Museum in Servia, founded in 1998, also in the municipality of Servia-Velvento.) It was installed in a 19th century, Macedonian-style manor called the Konstas Mansion.

The building was upgraded under the Leader+ community initiative, (Note: Leader+ is a program financed by the European Union that spent about E5 billion in 2000-2006 to help local rural players improve the long-term potential of their regions.) including internal structural changes, electrical installations, furniture and equipment. The project involved the cooperation of local stakeholders, scientists and donors.

== Exhibit ==
The folklore museum records pre-industrial life in rural Macedonia, in northern Greece. It is a small museum of 300 square metres (3,200 sq ft). Exhibits show occupations like spinning, weaving, sewing, tailoring, shoemaking, wood cutting and carpentry. Objects in the collection range in size from a pin to a cauldron, and include prized possessions such as a baptismal dress and mundane objects such as stone handmill.

The arrangement of objects represents a compromise between the need to display the museum objects and the need to represent a typical home of the time, where bread was baked and cloth was woven. The lighting deliberately creates a theatrical atmosphere, particularly in the rooms that present "realism". Other exhibits, such as "From Earth to Wine" and "From Earth to Bread" are lit more neutrally, giving more of an outdoors effect.

Guided tours give visitors information on local history, daily life in the area, traditional professions, tools and local costumes.
