= Theologos, Thasos =

Potamia Ποταμιά
- Community
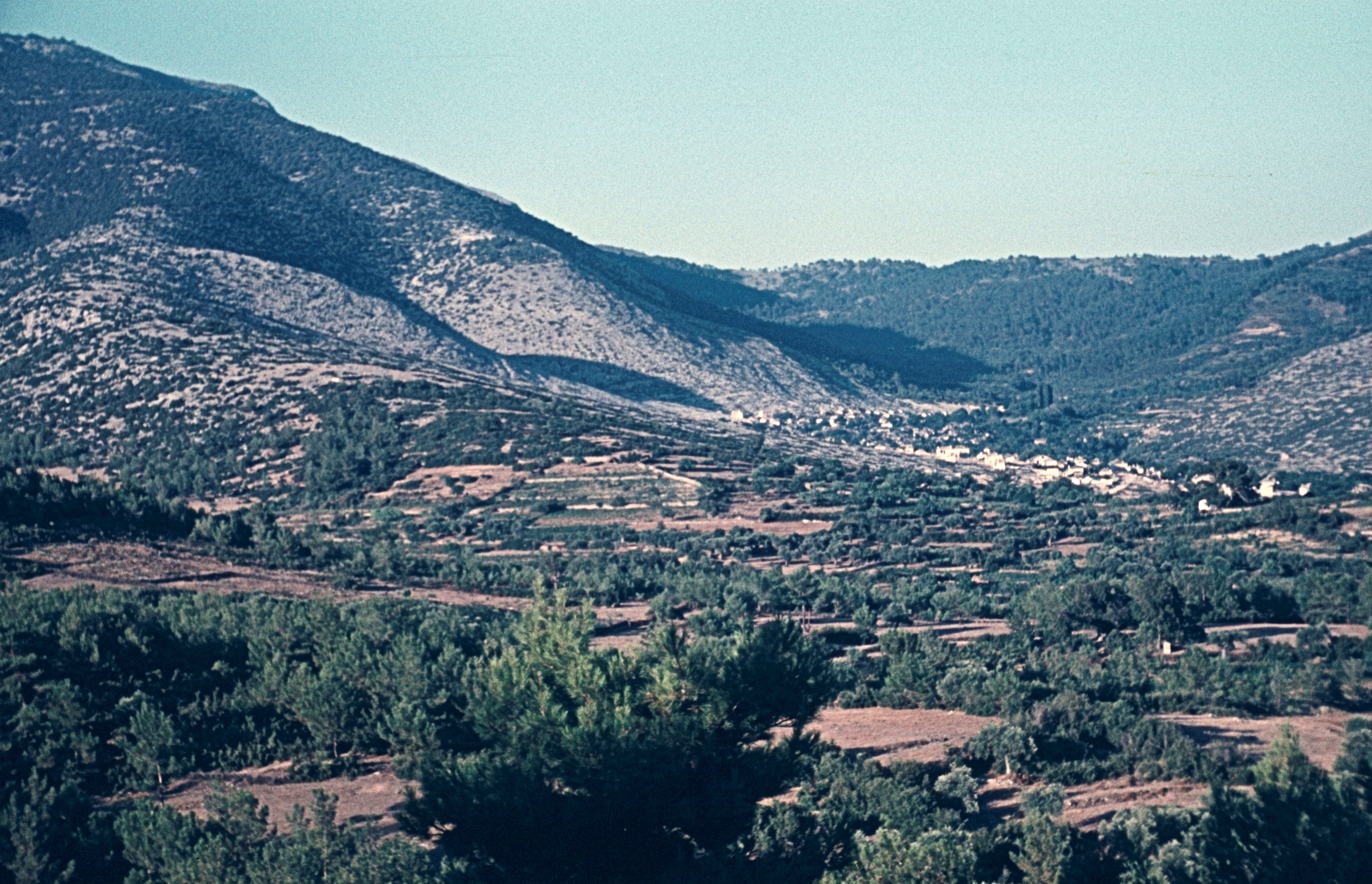
- Panorama of Theologos from 1957

- Location within Greece
- Coordinates: 40°39′36″N 24°41′29″E
- Country: Greece
- Administrative region: Eastern Macedonia and Thrace
- Regional unit: Thasos
- Municipality: Thasos

Population (2021)
  - Community: 1,548
- Time zone: UTC+2 (EET)
  - Summer (DST): UTC+3 (EEST)

Theologos (Greek: Θεολόγος) is a village and a community in the central part of the Greek island of Thasos. According to the 2021 census, it has 1,548 residents. It was the marketplace and administrative centre of the island during the Ottoman rule, from 1455 to 1902.

== History ==
In the Ottoman tahrir defter (number 75) of 1519, the settlement was recorded as a village with the name Tologo.
