= Limenaria =

Limenaria Λιμενάρια
- Community
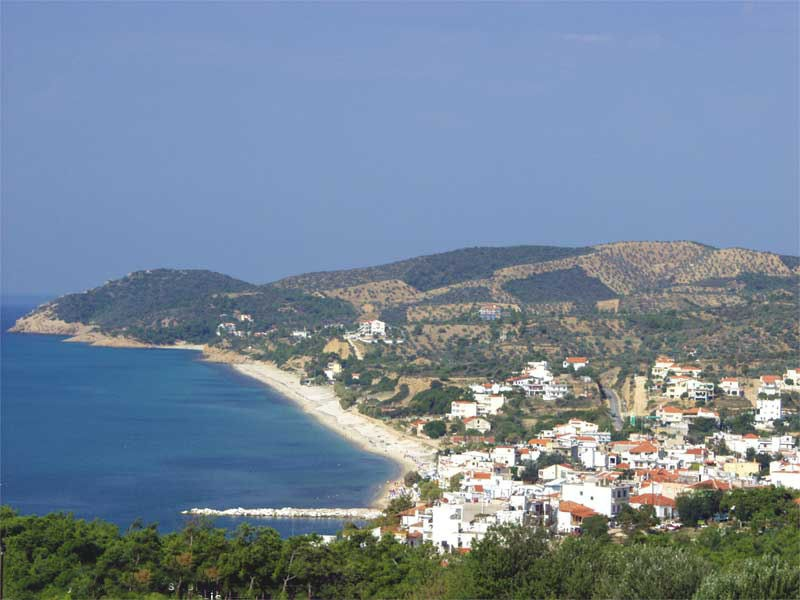
- Seafront in Limenaria

- Location within Greece
- Coordinates: 40°44′N 24°44′E
- Country: Greece
- Administrative region: East Macedonia and Thrace
- Regional unit: Thasos
- Municipality: Thasos
- Elevation: 1,108 m (3,635 ft)

Population (2021)
  - Community: 2,428
- Time zone: UTC+2 (EET)
  - Summer (DST): UTC+3 (EEST)
- Website: www.thassos.gr

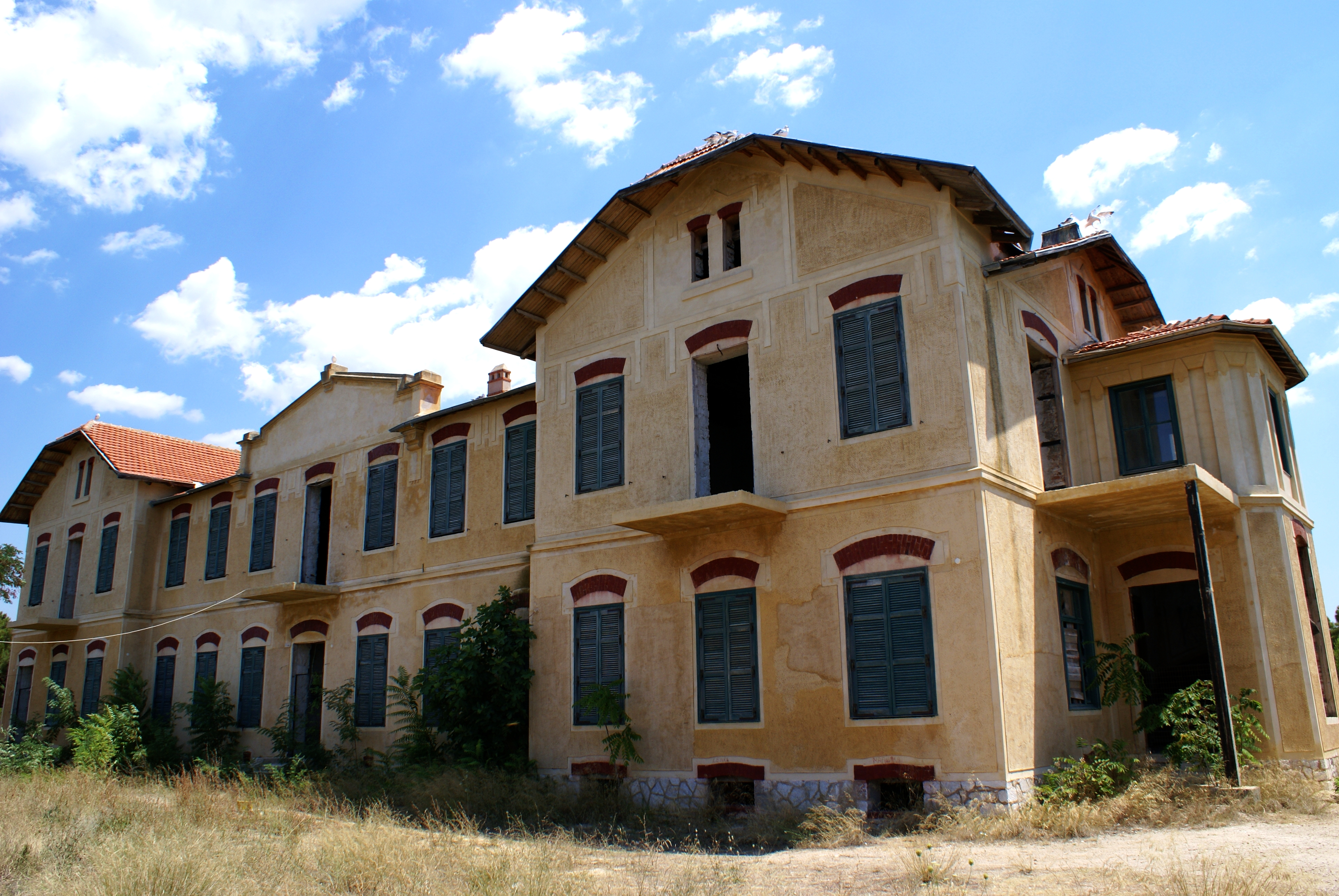
Old mansion

Limenaria (Greek: Λιμενάρια, meaning: covelets) is a village on the island of Thasos in northern Greece. The village numbers 2,428 residents (2021 census) and is the second largest settlement on the island of Thasos. The settlement is a popular tourist destination since the 1960s, with a 1.2 km long strand of beach (Stelakis Beach) and a number of smaller coves and pebbly beaches just to the west of the settlement next to the village of Trypiti (Τρυπητή), being the main tourist magnet for the locality. The village is also popular for tourists around the island for a visible view of the Holy Site of Mount Athos.
