= Wicklow Round =

Long distance hill running challenge in Ireland

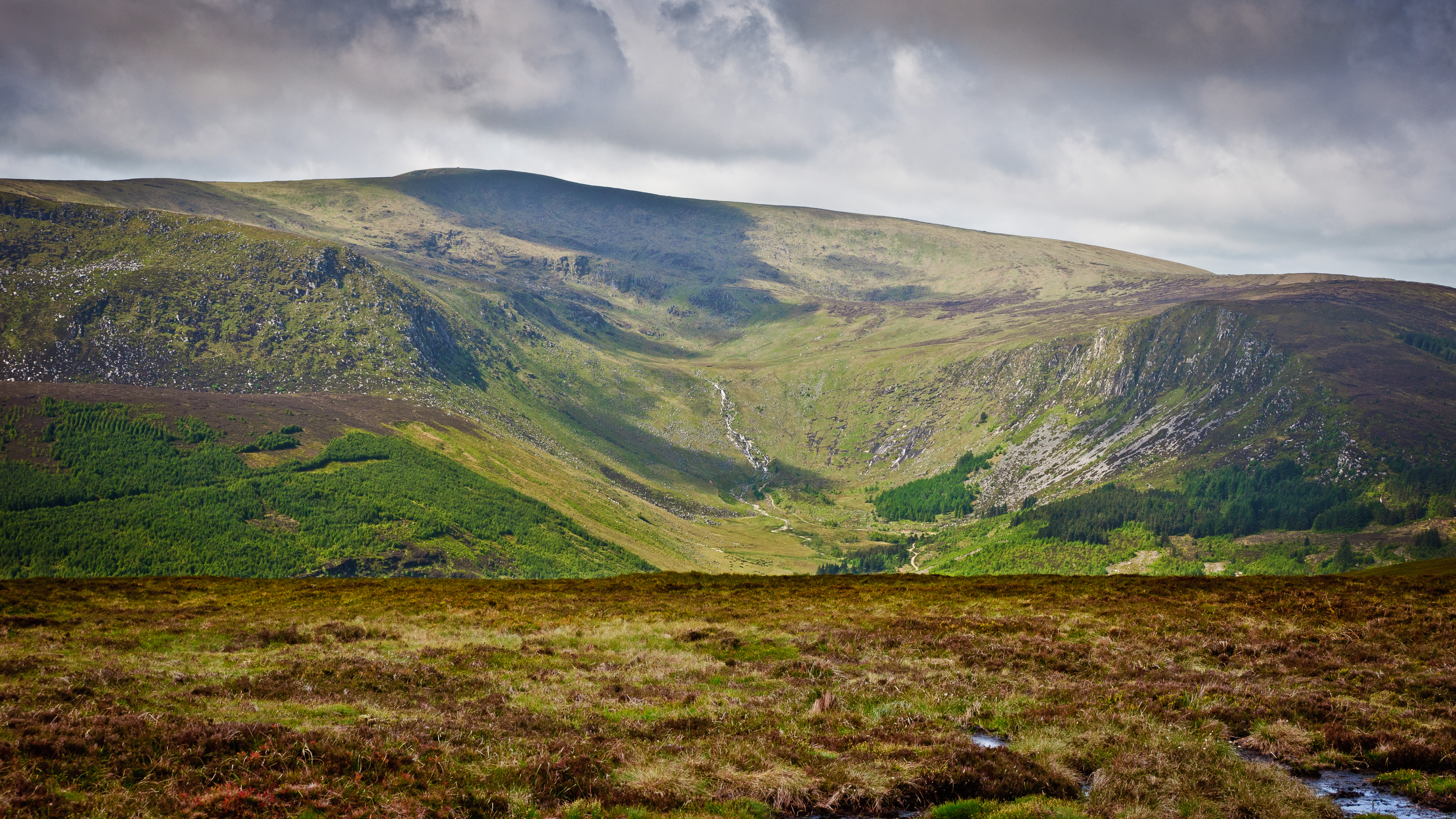
- Lugnaquilla, highest peak on the Round at 925 metres (3,035 ft); highest mountain in Leinster.
- Length: 100 kilometres (62 mi) depending on actual route
- Location: Wicklow Mountains, Ireland
- Established: 2008
- Trailheads: Fetherbed Track Junction
- Use: Hiking, Fell running
- Elevation change: circa 6,000 metres (19,685 ft) depending on actual route
- Highest point: Lugnaquilla at 925 metres (3,035 ft)
- Lowest point: Drumgroff at 50 metres (164 ft)
- Season: All year round
- Hazards: sinkholes amongst heather
- Surface: bogland, moorland, sheep paths, roads
- Website: IMRA

The Wicklow Round is a long-distance hill running challenge in the Wicklow Mountains in Ireland. The route follows a prescribed 100-kilometre circuit of 26 mountains, which must be completed in a fixed order, that total over 6,000 metres (20,000 ft) of elevation; there is some flexibility on route-choices between peaks. Rounds completed outside of a cut-off time of 24-hours are not generally recorded. Irish ultra-runner Joe Lalor is credited with the creation of the Round.

The first person to complete the Round was Moire O’Sullivan, in a time of 22:58:30 on 29 May 2008; O'Sullivan went on to write a book about her experience on the Round called Mud, Sweat, and Tears. Eoin Keith set a new record of 17:53:45 on 30 May 2009, which stood for nine years until it was beaten by U.S. runner, and Appalachian Trail record holder, Joe McConaughy, in a time of 17:09:44 on 6 May 2018. Several other runners have set records for the fastest Round. Between April and May 2019, the men's record was broken across three consecutive attempts, by Paddy O'Leary, Shane Lynch and Gavin Byrne. These attempts were featured in the short documentary film, "Coming Home - Ag Teacht Abhaile".

As of July 2019, the record is 15:04:30, set by Irish IAU Trail World Championships contestant, Gavin Byrne on 18 May 2019.

== Route ==
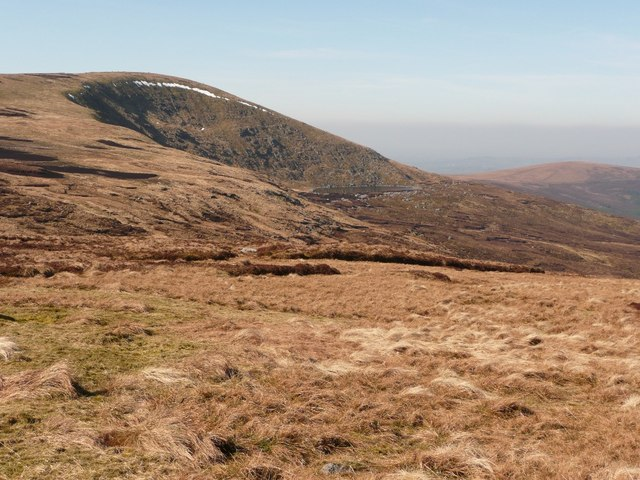
Mullaghcleevaun, 2nd-highest peak on the Round at 849 metres (2,785 ft); second highest mountain in Wicklow.

The 26 mountains of the Wicklow Round must be completed in the order as outlined below, as well as the check-point in the forest of Drumgoff.

Sequence	Goal (peak or check-point)
Start	Military Road – Featherbed Track junction
1	Kippure
2	Carrigvore
3	Gravale
4	Duff Hill
5	Mullaghcleevaun East Top
6	Mullaghcleevaun
7	Moanbane
8	Silsean
9	Oakwood
10	Table Mountain
11	Camenabologue
12	Lugnaquilla
13	Corrigasleggaun
14	Carrawaystick Mountain
Check-point	Drumgoff
15	Mullacor
16	Derrybawn
17	Camaderry
18	Tonelagee
19	Scarr
20	Knocknacloghoge
21	Luggala
22	Djouce
23	War Hill
24	Tonduff (also called Tonduff North)
25	Prince William's Seat
26	Knocknagun
End	Military Road – Featherbed Track junction

== Completions ==
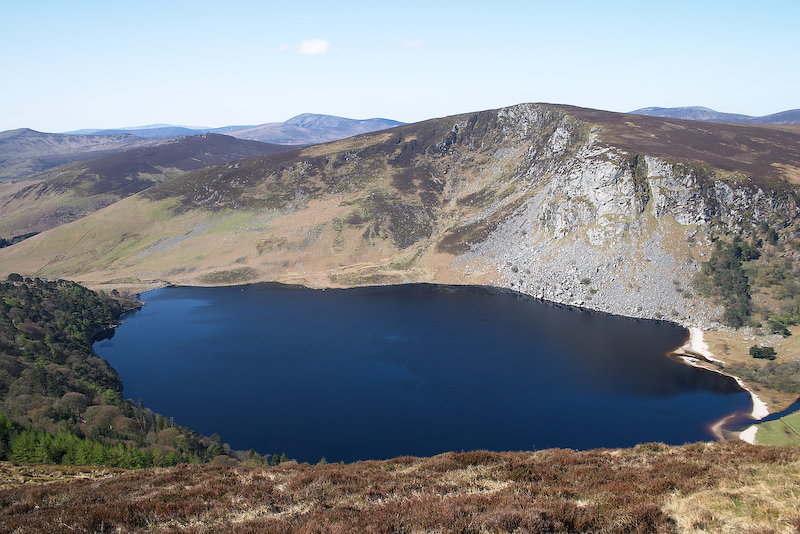
Summit of Luggala above Lough Tay; neighbouring summit of Knocknacloghoge is behind (left)

The Irish Mountain Running Association (IMRA) record the following sub-24 hour completions of the Wicklow Round:

Men's record holder (most recent record is the current record holder)
Women's record holder (most recent record is the current record holder)

Name	Date	Time
Moire O Sullivan	29 May 2009	22:58:30
Eoin Keith	30 May 2009	17:53:45
Paul Mahon	5 June 2009	19:39:25
Paul Nolan	5 June 2009	19:39:25
Jason Reid	5 June 2009	19:39:25
Adrian Tucker	25 June 2009	22:18:45
Greg Byrne	2 June 2012	20:56:00
Billy Reed	2 June 2012	20:56:00
Finbar McGurren	2 June 2012	20:56:00
Richard Nunan	8 June 2013	21:57:02
Jeff Fitzsimons	8 June 2013	21:57:02
Zoran Skrba	8 June 2013	21:57:02
Gareth Little	9 June 2013	23:39:36
Laurence Colleran	30 May 2015	20:45:00
Liam Vines	30 May 2015	20:45:00
Paul Morrissey	14 June 2015	23:47:32
Andreas Kusch	14 June 2015	23:47:32
Pol O'Murchu	21 June 2015	23:25:03
Mike Jordan	4 July 2015	23:21:00
Sam Scriven	4 July 2015	23:21:00
Brian O'Meara	4 July 2015	23:21:00
Kevin Shannon	4 August 2015	21:59:36
Mark Shannon	4 August 2015	21:59:36
Paul O'Callaghan	28 May 2016	21:25:00
Adrian Hennessy	6 June 2016	19:36:00
John Ryan Preston	19 June 2016	21:06:00
Liam Vines	11 December 2016	22:56:00
Karina Jonina	6 May 2017	22:37:43
Joseph McConaughy	6 May 2018	17:09:44
Paul Keville	23 June 2018	22:59:00
Warren Swords	22 July 2018	23:13:45
Brian Kitson	22 July 2018	23:13:45
Paul O'Callaghan	21 December 2018	23:38:00
Paddy O'Leary	13 April 2019	16:27:20
Shane Lynch	21 April 2019	16:23:32
Gavin Byrne	18 May 2019	15:04:30
John Murray	2 June 2019	22:05:23
John Murray	3 August 2019	23:41:08
Daniela Lubiscakova	24 July 2020	23:14:26
Philip O'Connell	24 July 2020	23:14:26

== Books & Films & Podcasts ==
- Moire O'Sullivan (July 2011). Mud, Sweat and Tears: An Irish Woman's Journey of Self-Discovery Paperback. ISBN 978-0615505152.
- Dooster Film (July 2019). Coming Home - Ag Teacht Abhaile. Award-winning documentary film.
- Running Gingerly Podcast: The Wicklow Round - Irelands great unsung mountain round

== See also ==
- Denis Rankin Round
- Lists of mountains in Ireland
- Wicklow Mountains
- Wicklow Way
