= Carrigvore =

Mountain in County Wicklow, Ireland

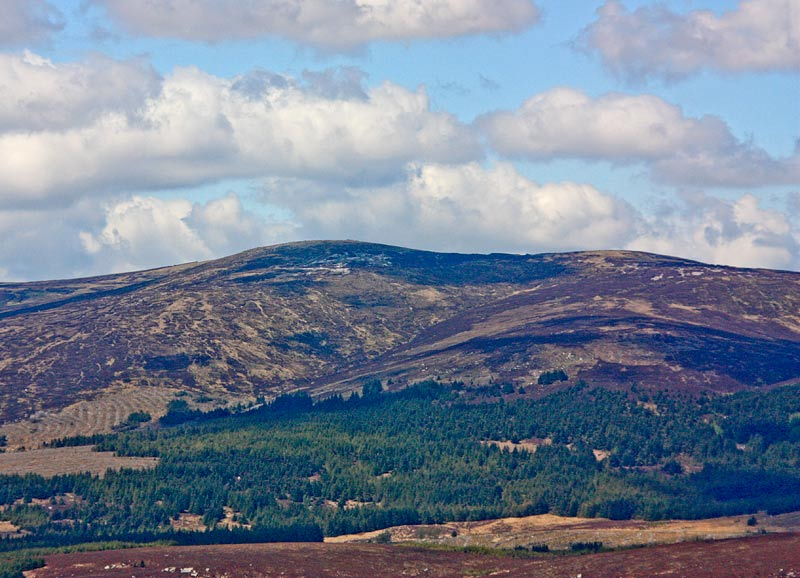
- Gravale (highest) with Carrigvore (right) from SE

Highest point
- Elevation: 682 m (2,238 ft)
- Prominence: 67 m (220 ft)
- Listing: Hewitt, Arderin, Simm, Vandeleur-Lynam
- Coordinates: 53.130277°N 6.323459°W

Naming
- Native name: Carraig Mhór
- English translation: big rock

Geography
- Location within island of Ireland
- Location: County Wicklow, Ireland
- Parent range: Wicklow Mountains
- OSI/OSNI grid: O122101
- Topo map: OSi Discovery 56

Geology
- Mountain type: Granite with microcline phenocrysts

Climbing
- Easiest route: from the Sally Gap, or along the R115

Carrigvore (Irish: Carraig Mhór, meaning 'big rock') at 682 metres (2,238 ft), is the 111th–highest peak in Ireland on the Arderin scale, and the 134th–highest peak on the Vandeleur-Lynam scale. Carrigvore is in the middle section of the Wicklow Mountains, in Ireland, and is part of a large north-east to south-west "boggy ridge" that runs from the Sally Gap to Carrigvore, and then on to Gravale 718 metres (2,356 ft); after a col, the ridge continues south-westwards to meet Duff Hill 720 metres (2,360 ft), which is part of the larger massif of Mullaghcleevaun 849 metres (2,785 ft).

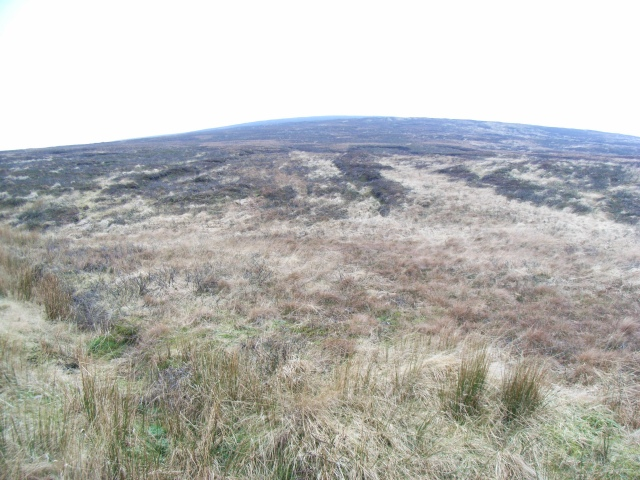
View to summit from the Sally Gap

== See also ==
- Wicklow Way
- Wicklow Mountains
- Lists of mountains in Ireland
- List of mountains of the British Isles by height
- List of Hewitt mountains in England, Wales and Ireland
