= Tonelagee =

Mountain in County Wicklow, Ireland

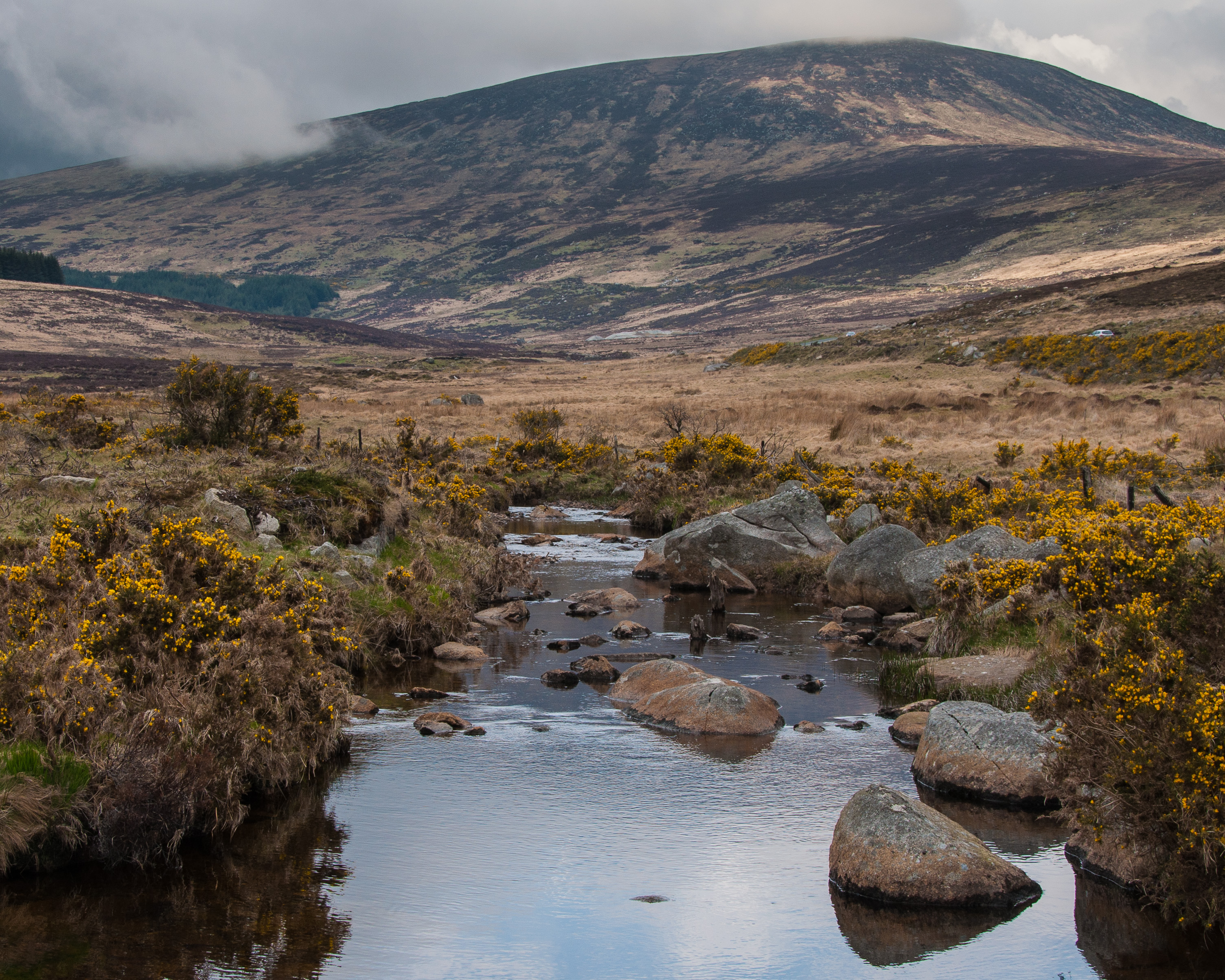
- Tonelagee from the Glendasan River

Highest point
- Elevation: 817 m (2,680 ft)
- Prominence: 202 m (663 ft)
- Isolation: 5.43 km (3.37 mi)
- Listing: 100 Highest Irish Mountains, Marilyn, Hewitt, Arderin, Simm, Vandeleur-Lynam
- Coordinates: 53.053606°N 6.382171°W

Naming
- Native name: Tóin le Gaoith
- English translation: backside to the wind

Geography
- Location within island of Ireland
- Location: County Wicklow, Ireland
- Parent range: Wicklow Mountains
- OSI/OSNI grid: O0850301589
- Topo map: OSi Discovery 56

Geology
- Mountain type: Adamellite with microcline phenocrysts

Climbing
- Easiest route: From a car park at the top of nearby Glenmacnas Waterfall (on the Sally Gap side) where there are routes to the summit on either side of the lake and stream.

Tonelagee (Irish: Tóin le Gaoith, meaning 'backside to the wind'), is at 817 metres (2,680 ft), is the 25th–highest peak in Ireland on the Arderin scale, and the 33rd–highest peak on the Vandeleur-Lynam scale. Tonelagee is situated in the central sector of the Wicklow Mountains range, and sits on the main "central spine" of the range that runs from Kippure in the north, to Lugnaquillia in the south; and in particular, the continuous "central boggy ridge" that runs from the Sally Gap in the north, via Mullaghcleevaun, to Tonelagee. Tonelagee is the third highest peak in Wicklow after Lugnaquilla and Mullaghcleevaun.

To the north is the subsidiary summit of Stoney Top 714 metres (2,343 ft), and to the east is another subsidiary summit of Tonelagee NE Top 668 metres (2,192 ft); between these three summits is the deep "heart-shaped" corrie lake of Lough Ouler.

== Namings ==
Irish academic Paul Tempan, notes Tonelagee is sometimes spelled Tonelegee and its Irish name of Tóin le Gaoith appears in several Irish placenames, such as Tandragee in County Antrim, however, it was not clear what they had in common regarding the wind. In addition, Tempan found no particular evidence of any other Irish language names behind Stoney Top except to note that there was a cross-inscribed standing stone between Stoney Top and the summit of Tonelagee.

== Geography ==
Tonelagee is the third highest peak in the Wicklow Mountains, and is situated in southern-end of the central section of the range. Tonelagee sits on the main "central spine" of the whole Wicklow Mountains range that runs from Kippure in the north, to Lugnaquillia in the south, and in particular, Tonelagee is the southern terminus of the continuous "central boggy ridge" that runs from the Sally Gap in the north, via Mullaghcleevaun, to Tonelagee.

Tonelagee's prominence of 202 metres (663 ft), qualifies it as a Marilyn, and also ranks it as the 15th-highest mountain in Ireland on the MountainViews Online Database, 100 Highest Irish Mountains, where the minimum prominence threshold is 100 metres. Tonelagee's main "boggy massif" includes the northern subsidiary summit of Stoney Top 714 metres (2,343 ft), which has a prominence of 19 metres (62 ft) that qualifies it as Vandeleur-Lynam; while its second major eastern subsidiary summit of Tonelagee NE Top 668 metres (2,192 ft), has a prominence of 23 metres (75 ft) also qualifying it as Vandeleur-Lynam.

Tonelagee's massif includes a long south-easterly spur with the summits of (in order of proximity): Tonlagee South-East Top 546 metres (1,791 ft), Brockagh Mountain North-West Top 548 metres (1,798 ft), Brockagh Mountain 557 metres (1,827 ft), and Brockagh Mountain SE Top 470 metres (1,540 ft).

One of Tonelagee's most distinctive features is its deep north-eastern corrie, which contains the "heart-shaped" natural lake of Lough Ouler at 596 metres (1,955 ft) (not as high as Wicklow's highest natural lake of Cleevaun Lough at 686 metres (2,251 ft), on Mullaghcleevaun).

== Hill walking ==
A common route to the summit of Tonelagee is from the east via an 8-kilometre 3–4 hour "loop walk" which starts from a large car-park just above Glenmacnass Waterfall just off the R115 road (also called the Old Military Road). The route crosses the Glenmacnass River to reach Tonelagee's north-east corrie and Lough Ouler, from where it then summits via the northern edge of the corrie rim to the summit of Tonelagee (passing the mica-shist "standing stone" along the way); the descent is via Tonelagee NE Top and then directly down to the shoulder to the Glenmacnass Waterfall car park.

A shorter even more direct route is from the Wicklow Gap on the R756 road to the west, climbing the 6-kilometre 2–3 hour route directly up the shoulder of Tonelagee and then retracing back to the car; this route is rarely offered in guidebooks as it leaves out Lough Ouler and Tonelagee's subsidiary summits.

== Bibliography ==
- Fairbairn, Helen (2014). Dublin & Wicklow: A Walking Guide. Collins Press. ISBN 978-1848892019.
- Fairbairn, Helen (2014). Ireland's Best Walks: A Walking Guide. Collins Press. ISBN 978-1848892118.
- MountainViews Online Database (Simon Stewart) (2013). A Guide to Ireland's Mountain Summits: The Vandeleur-Lynams & the Arderins. Collins Books. ISBN 978-1-84889-164-7.
- Dillion, Paddy (1993). The Mountains of Ireland: A Guide to Walking the Summits. Cicerone. ISBN 978-1852841102.

== Gallery ==
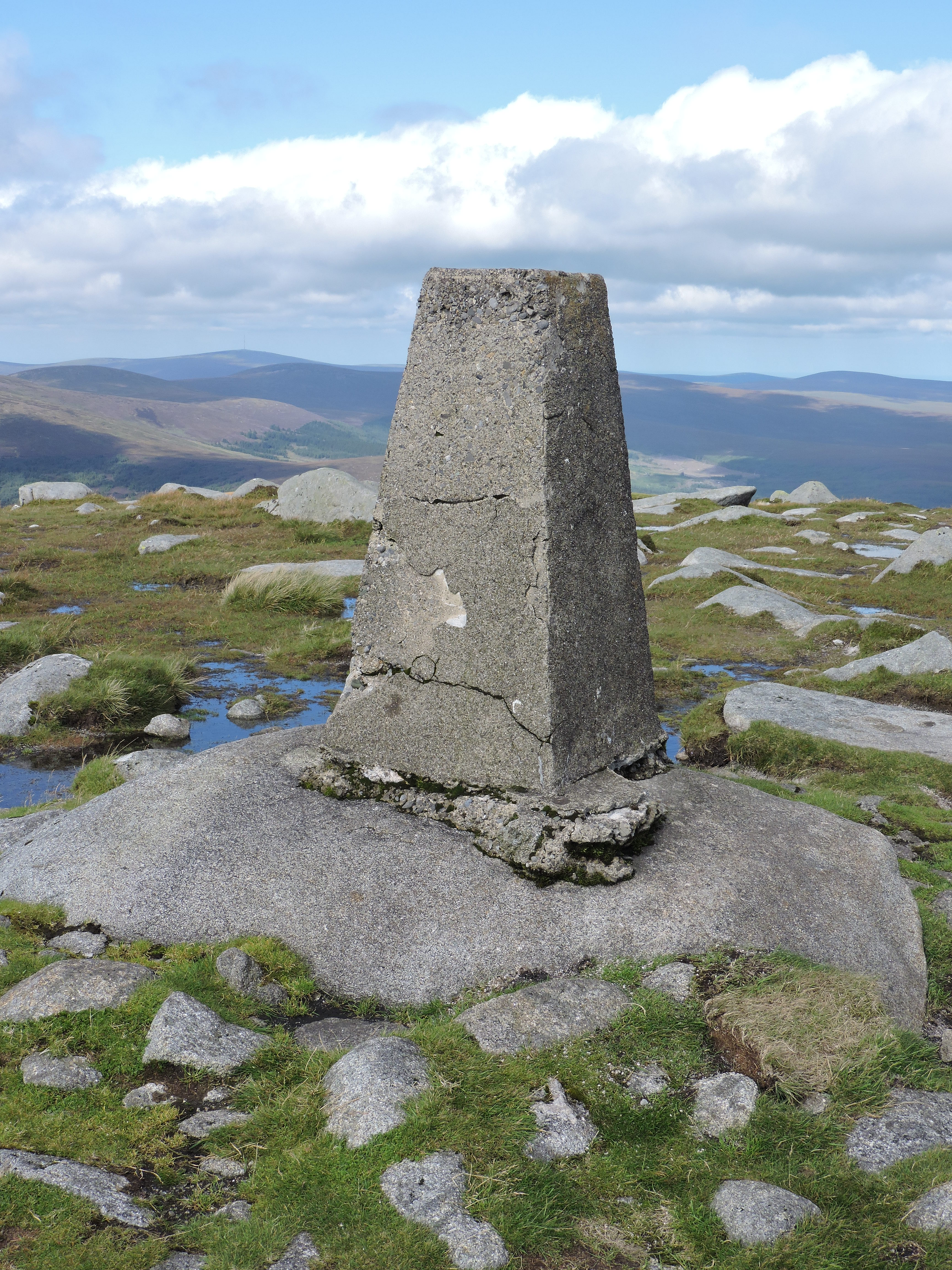
Summit pillar

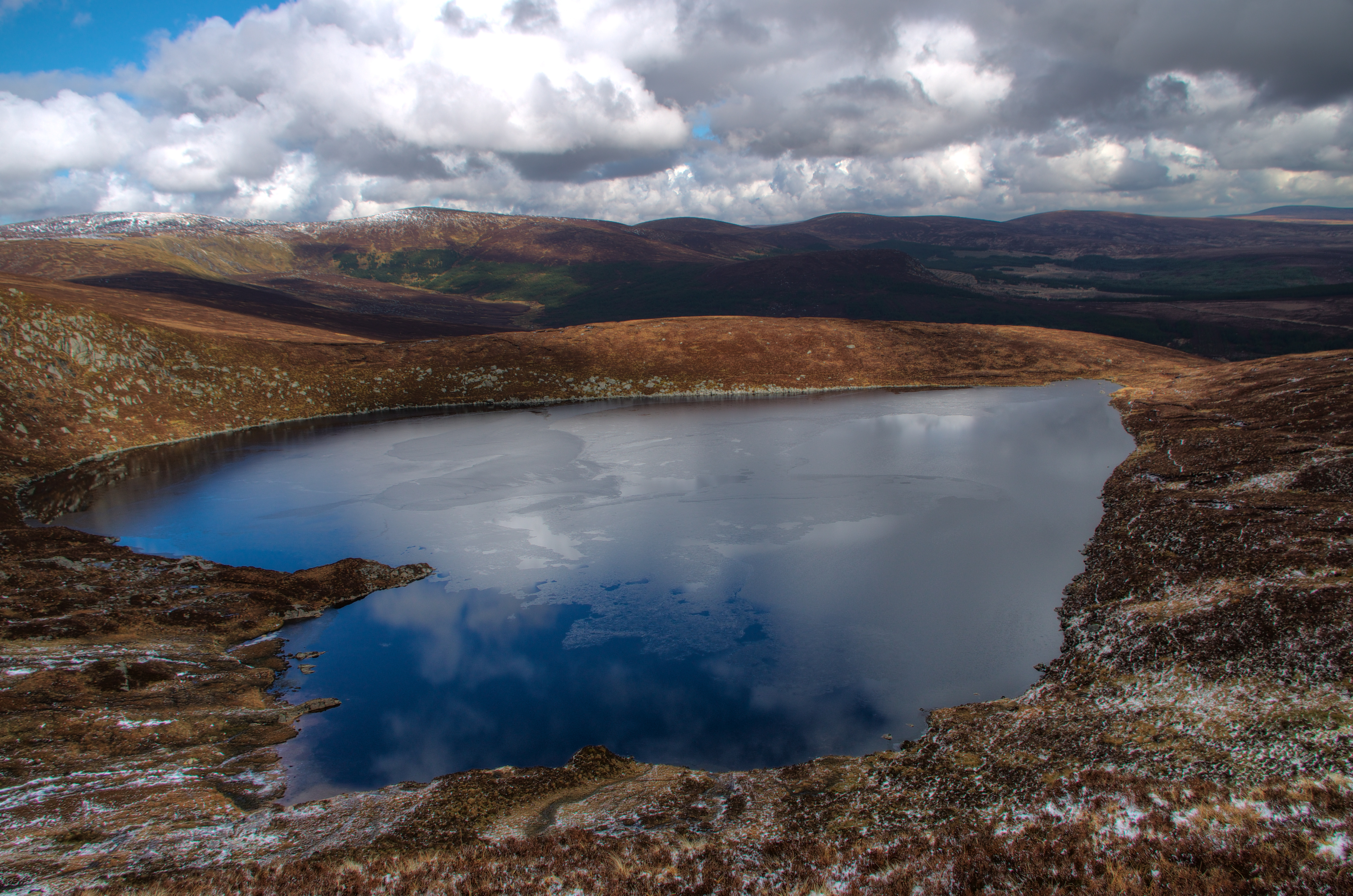
Heart-shaped Lough Ouler

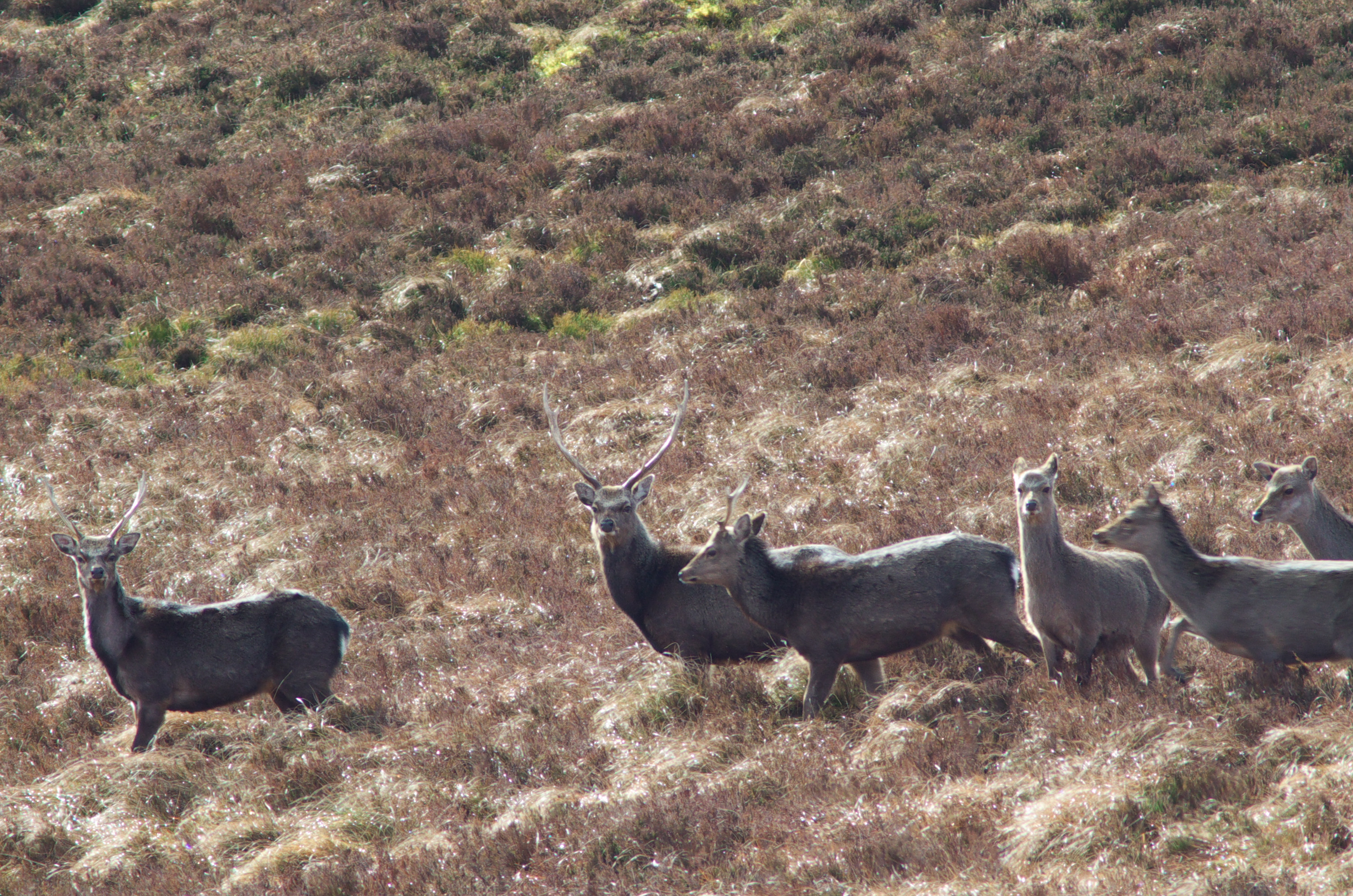
Deer on Tonelagee

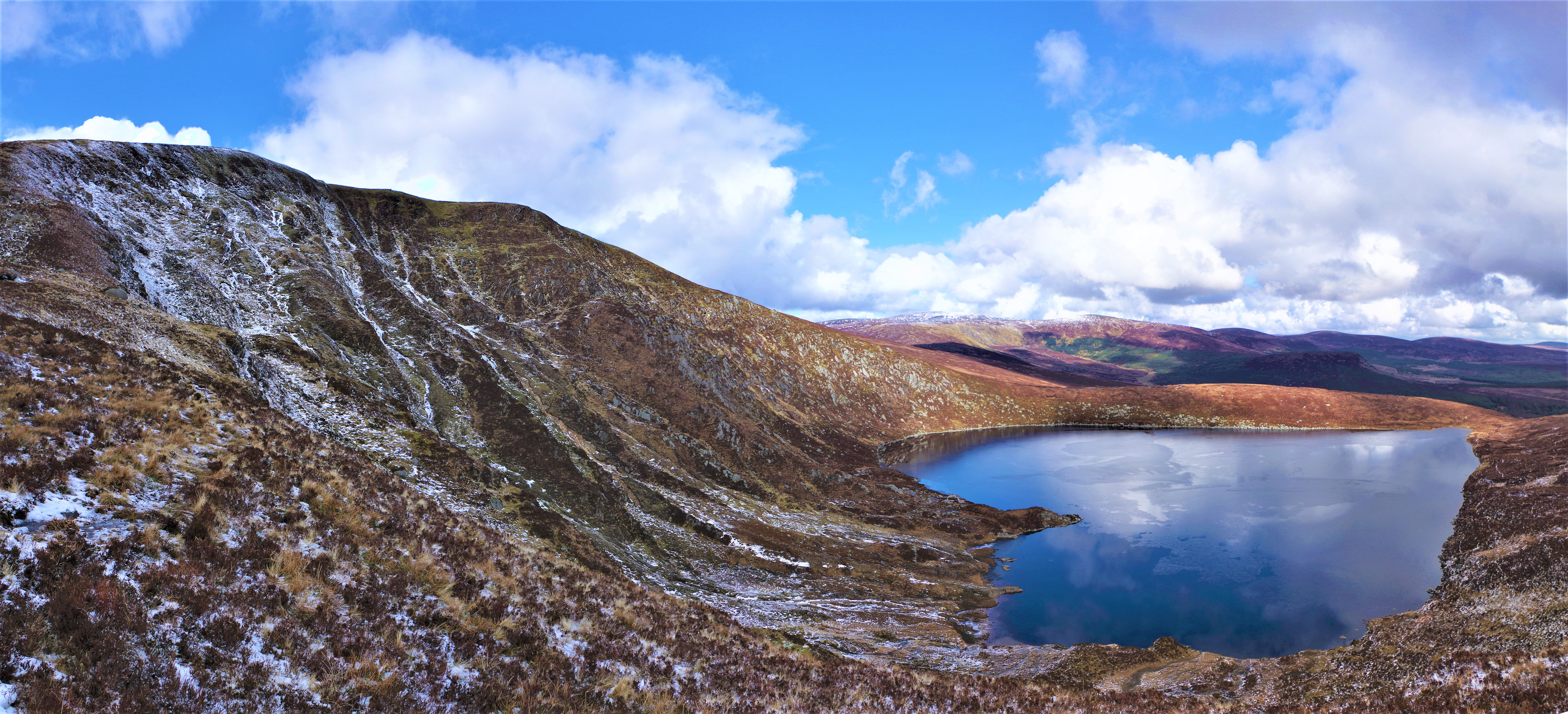
North-east corrie and Lough Ouler

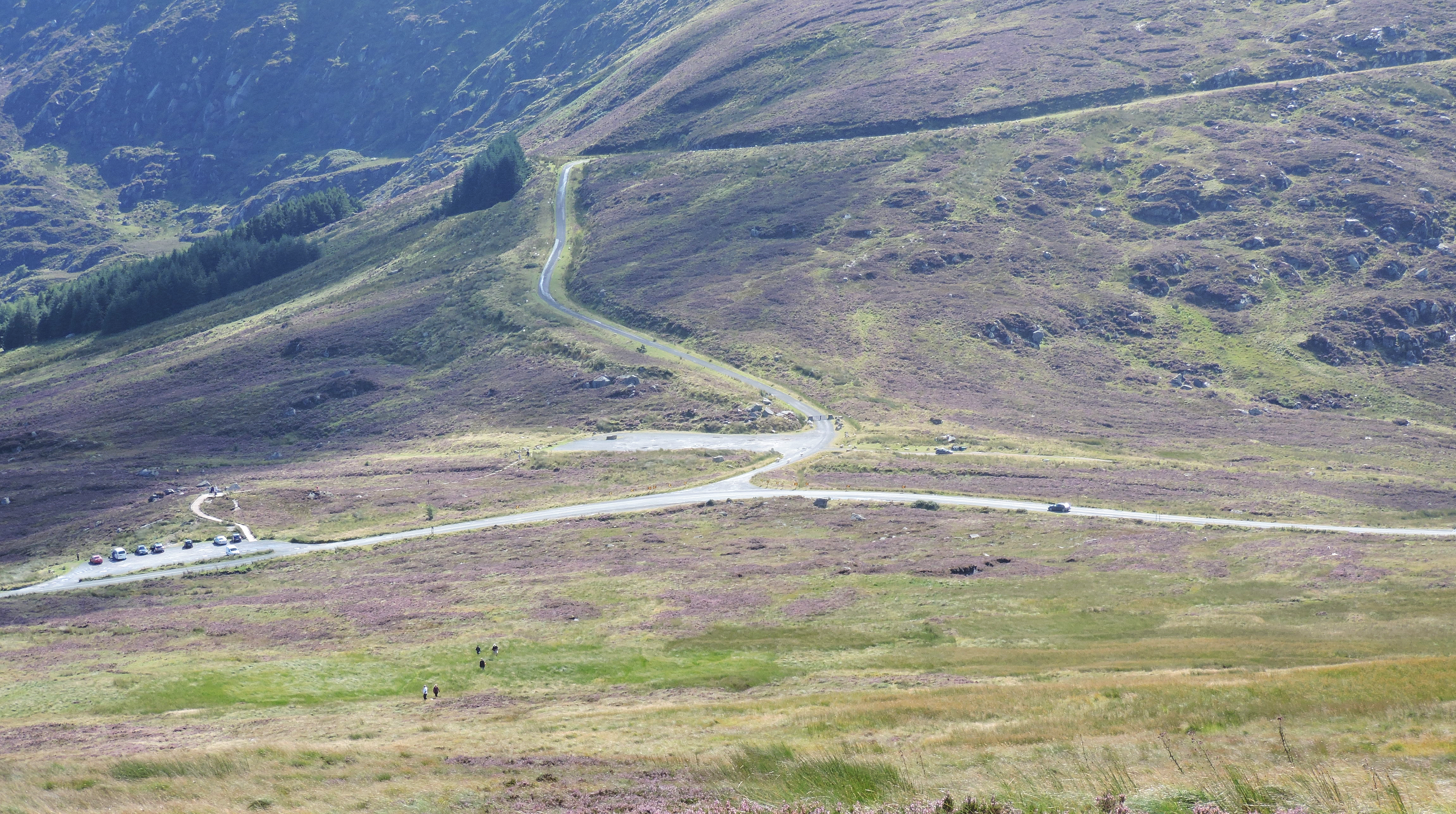
Wicklow Gap on slopes of Tonelagee

== See also ==
- Wicklow Way
- Wicklow Round
- Wicklow Mountains
- Lists of mountains in Ireland
- List of mountains of the British Isles by height
- List of Marilyns in the British Isles
- List of Hewitt mountains in England, Wales and Ireland
