= Mullaghcleevaun =

Mountain in Wicklow, Ireland

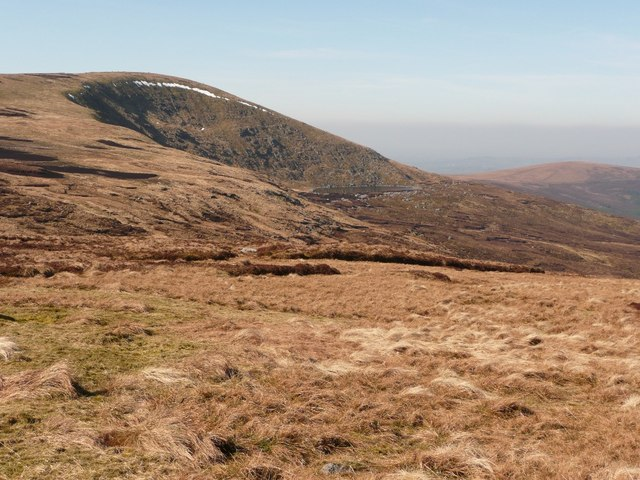
- Summit and northern corrie of Lough Cleevaun

Highest point
- Elevation: 849 m (2,785 ft)
- Prominence: 374 m (1,227 ft)
- Listing: 100 Highest Irish Mountains, Hewitt, Marilyn, Arderin, Simm, Vandeleur-Lynam
- Coordinates: 53.103626°N 6.406724°W

Naming
- Native name: Mullach Cliabháin (Irish)
- English translation: 'summit of the cradle/basket'
- Pronunciation: Irish: [ˈmˠʊl̪ˠəx ˈclʲiəwaːnʲ]

Geography
- Location within island of Ireland
- Location: Wicklow, Ireland
- Parent range: Wicklow Mountains
- OSI/OSNI grid: O0676307049
- Topo map: OSi Discovery 56

Geology
- Rock type: Granite with microcline phenocrysts

Mullaghcleevaun (Irish: Mullach Cliabháin, meaning 'summit of the cradle/basket') at 849 metres (2,785 ft), is the 15th–highest peak in Ireland on the Arderin scale, and the 20th–highest peak on the Vandeleur-Lynam scale. Mullaghcleevaun is in the central sector of the Wicklow Mountains range, in Wicklow, Ireland; it is the 2nd highest peak in Wicklow after Lugnaquilla. Mullaghcleevaun lies on the main "central spine" of the whole range that runs from Kippure in the north, to Lugnaquillia in the south; and in particular, it lies on the continuous "central boggy ridge" that runs from the Sally Gap to Tonelagee.

To the east of the main summit of Mullaghcleevaun is Mullaghcleevaun East Top 790 metres (2,590 ft). Below the summit of Mullaghcleevaun lies the corrie lake of Cleevaun Lough, Wicklow's highest natural lake at 686 metres (2,251 ft).

== Naming ==
According to Irish academic Paul Tempan, Patrick Weston Joyce notes that Mullaghcleevaun was named after a "cradle-like depression near the top, presumably the one occupied by Cleevaun Lough".

== Geography ==
Mullaghcleevaun is the 2nd highest peak in the Wicklow Mountains, and is situated in the central sector of the whole range, on the western edge overlooking the Poulaphouca Reservoir (also called the "Blessington Lakes").

Mullaghcleevan's prominence of 374 metres (1,227 ft), makes it the 8th-highest mountain in Ireland on the MountainViews Online Database, 100 Highest Irish Mountains, where the minimum prominence threshold is 100 metres. Mullaghcleevaun's flat summit is visible from other peaks in the range, and its massif also includes the subsidiary summit of Mullaghcleevaun East Top 790 metres (2,590 ft), whose prominence of 40 metres (130 ft) qualifies it as Hewitt. To the south-east of Mullaghcleevaun East Top is the summit of Carrigshouk 573 metres (1,880 ft), whose prominence of 31 metres (102 ft) qualifies it as an Arderin. Further away on Mullaghcleevaun's larger massif is Duff Hill 720 metres (2,360 ft), which lies to the north.

Mullaghcleevaun's most distinctive feature is its deep northern corrie, which contains Wicklow's highest natural lake, Lough Cleevaun 686 metres (2,251 ft).

Mullaghcleevaun's southeastern slopes are the source of the Glenmacnass River which flows down the Glenmacnass Waterfall into the Glenmacnass Valley and on to Laragh.

== Hill walking ==
A common route to the summit of Mullaghcleevaun is from the south via an 8.5-kilometre 3-4 hour walk which starts from a small car-park in the forest below Carraigshouk 572 metres (1,877 ft) (the car-park is known locally as "The Oasis") just off the R115 road (also called the Old Military Road). This southerly route ascends to Mullaghcleevaun East Top and then to the summit of Mullaghcleevaun, before retracing to the car-park.

A similar distance route can be done from the north starting at the car-park at Ballynultagh Gap (O044108), which lies between Black Hill and Sorrel Hill).

A longer undertaking is the complete north-east to south-west "boggy ridge" that runs from the Sally Gap to Carrigvore 682 metres (2,238 ft), and then on to Gravale 718 metres (2,356 ft), and then after a col, the ridge continues south-westwards to meet Duff Hill 720 metres (2,360 ft), and then on to Mullaghcleevaun East Top and Mullaghcleevaun itself. Getting from the Sally Gap to Mullaghcleevan is itself an 8.5-kilometre 3-4 hour walk, which some hill walkers avoid having to completely retrace back to the Sally Gap, and thus completing a 7-hour walk, by instead using two cars.

== Gallery ==
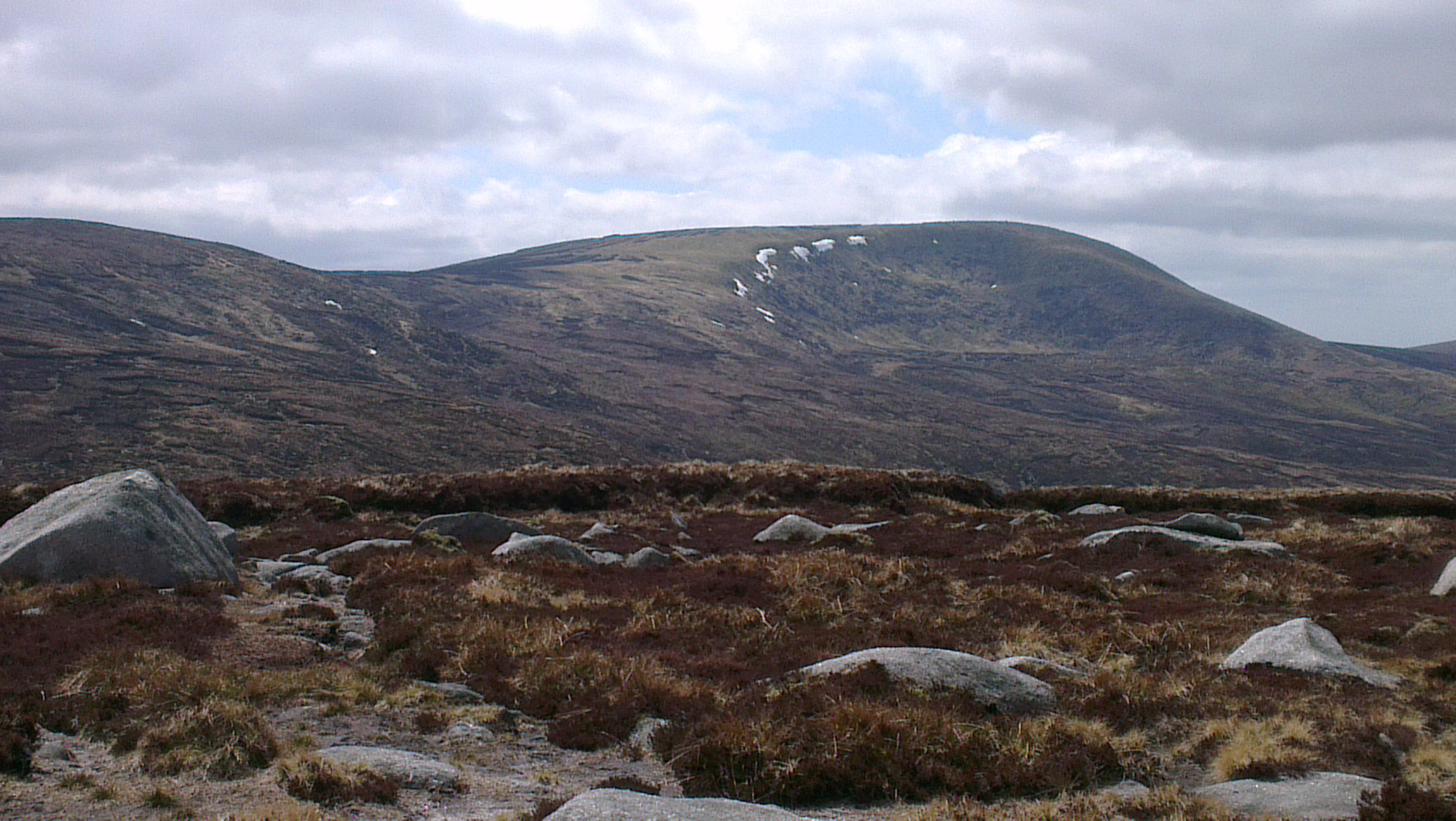
Northern corrie

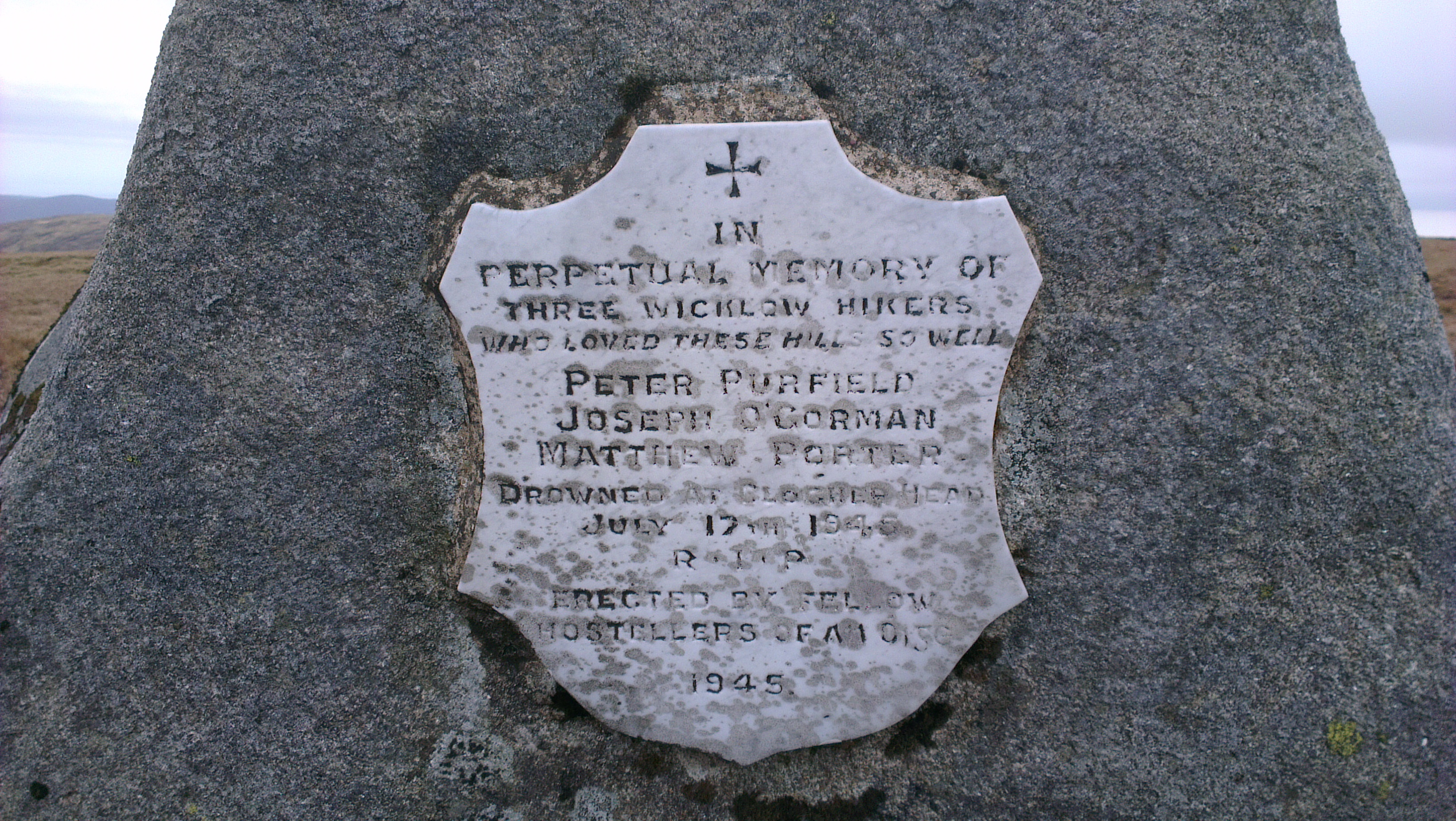
An Oige memorial plaque

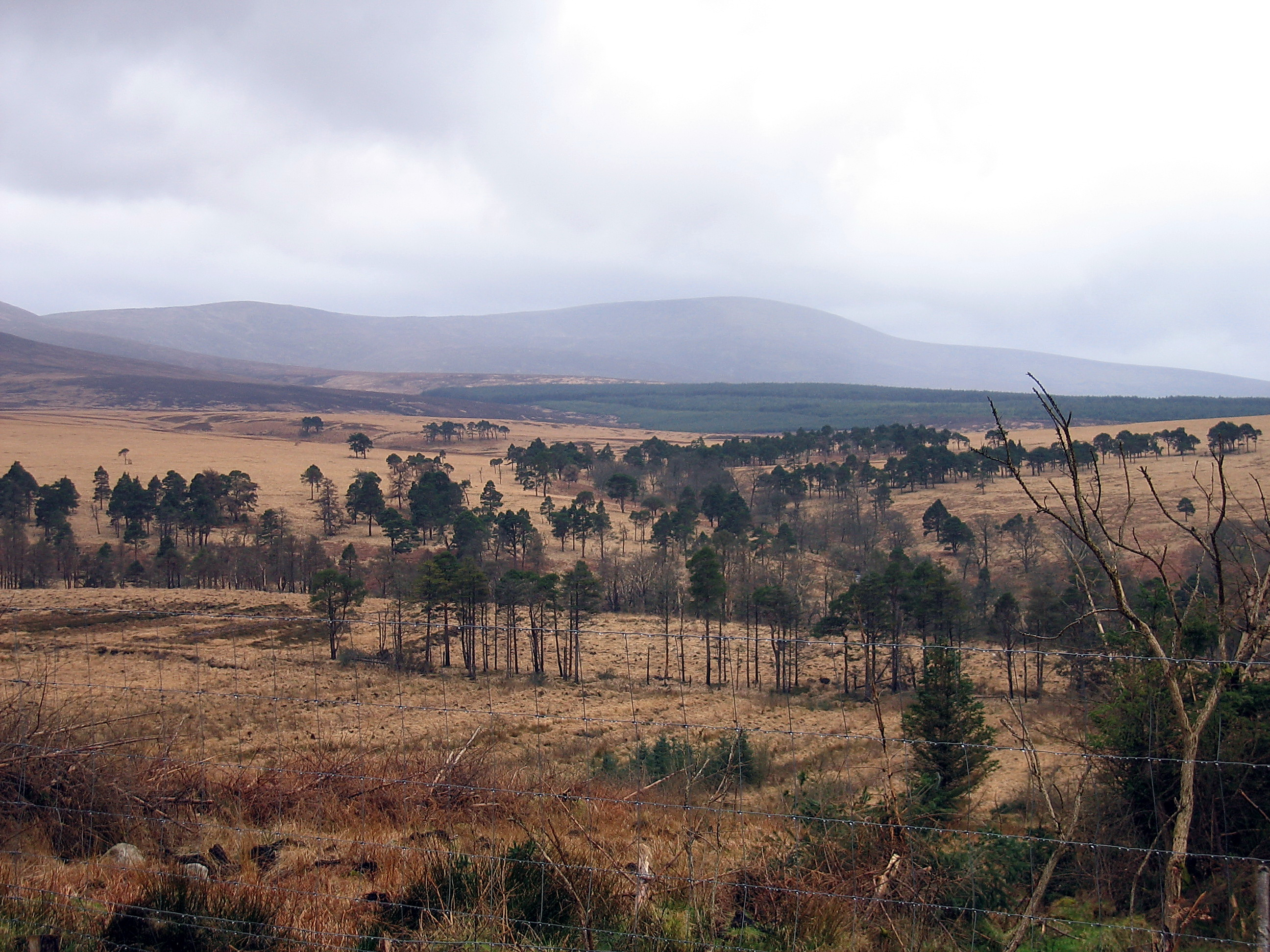
From the R759

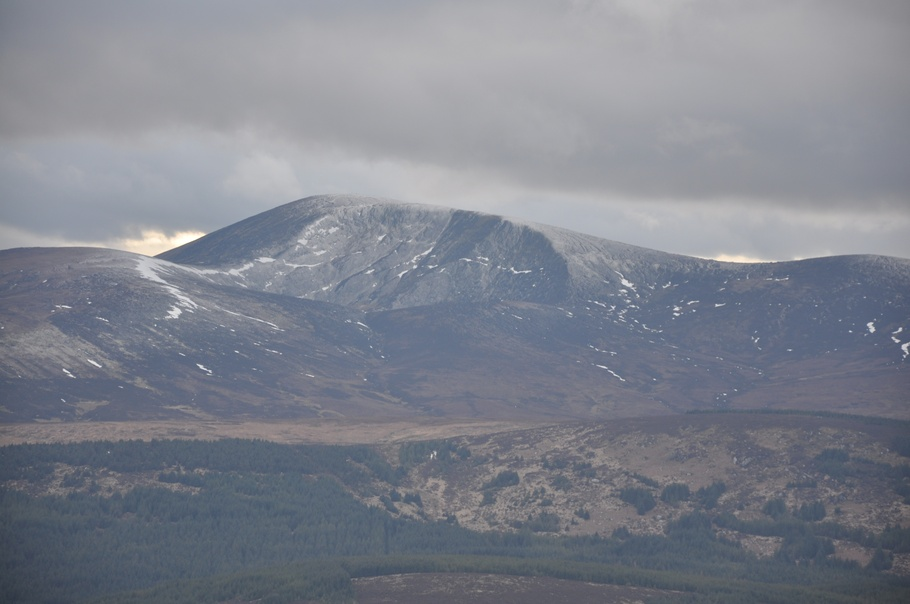
Northern corrie, winter

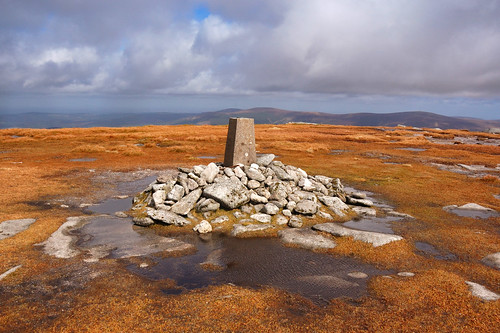
Summit cairn

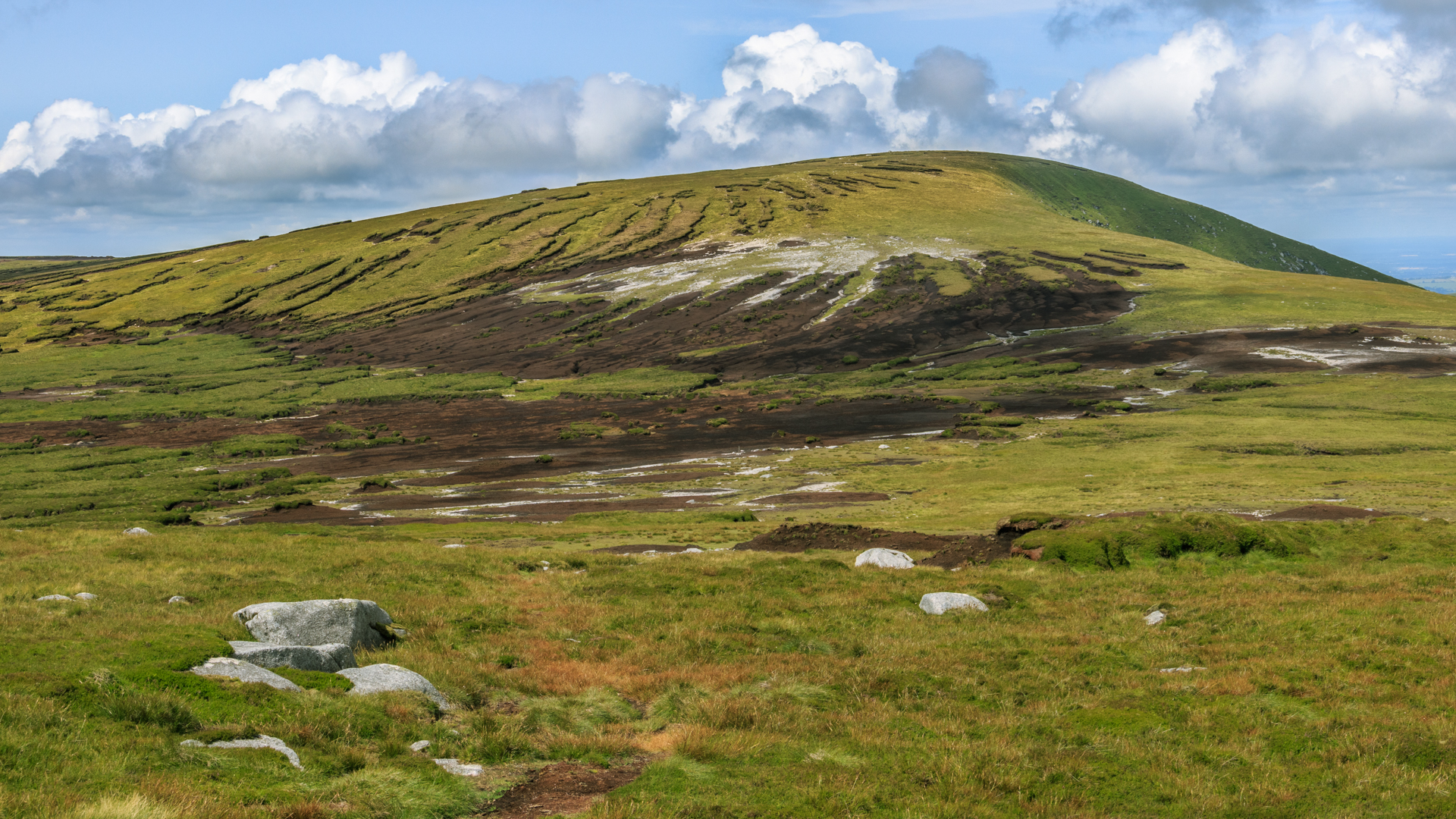
View from the East

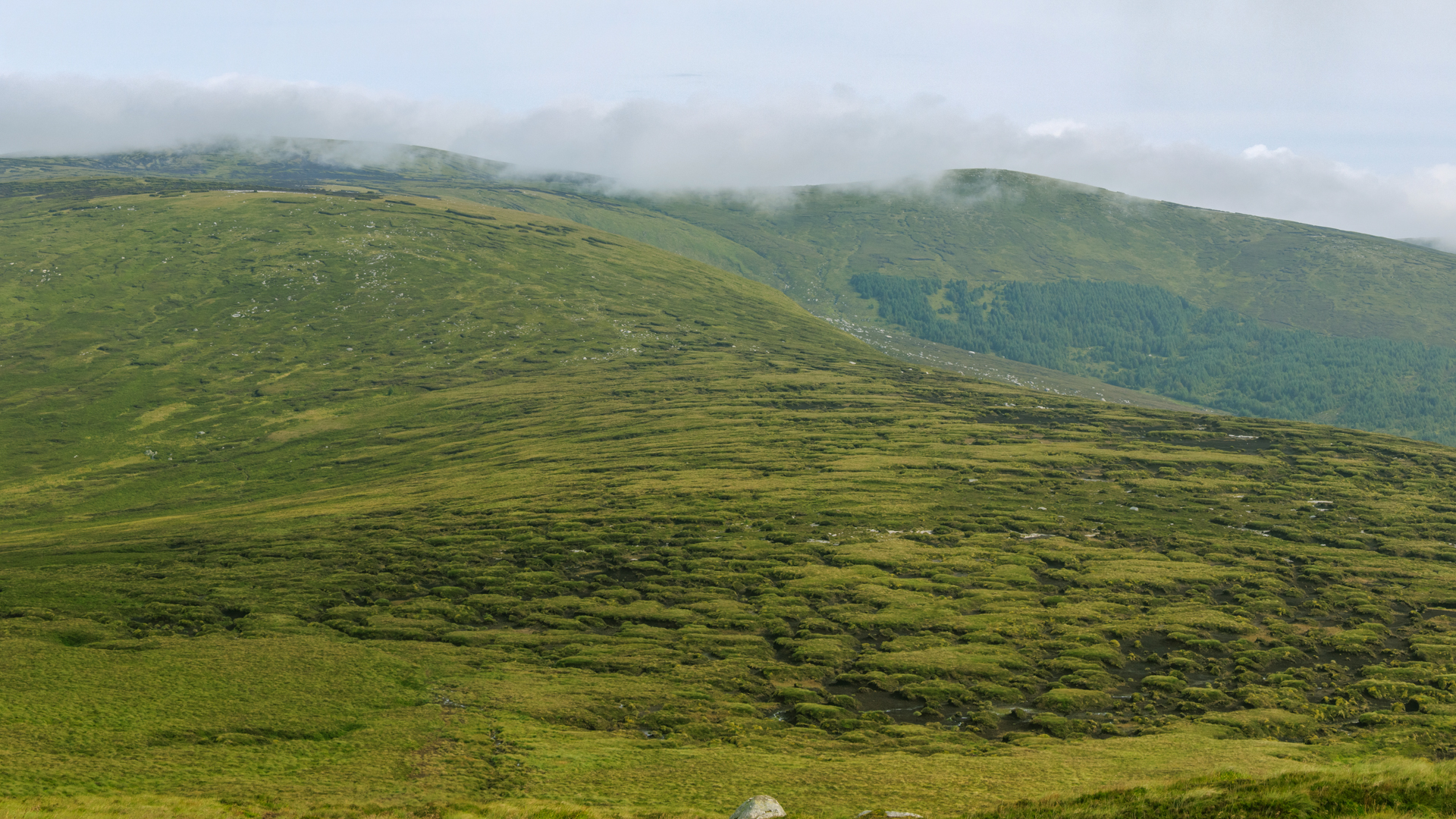
View from the south of Mullaghcleevaun

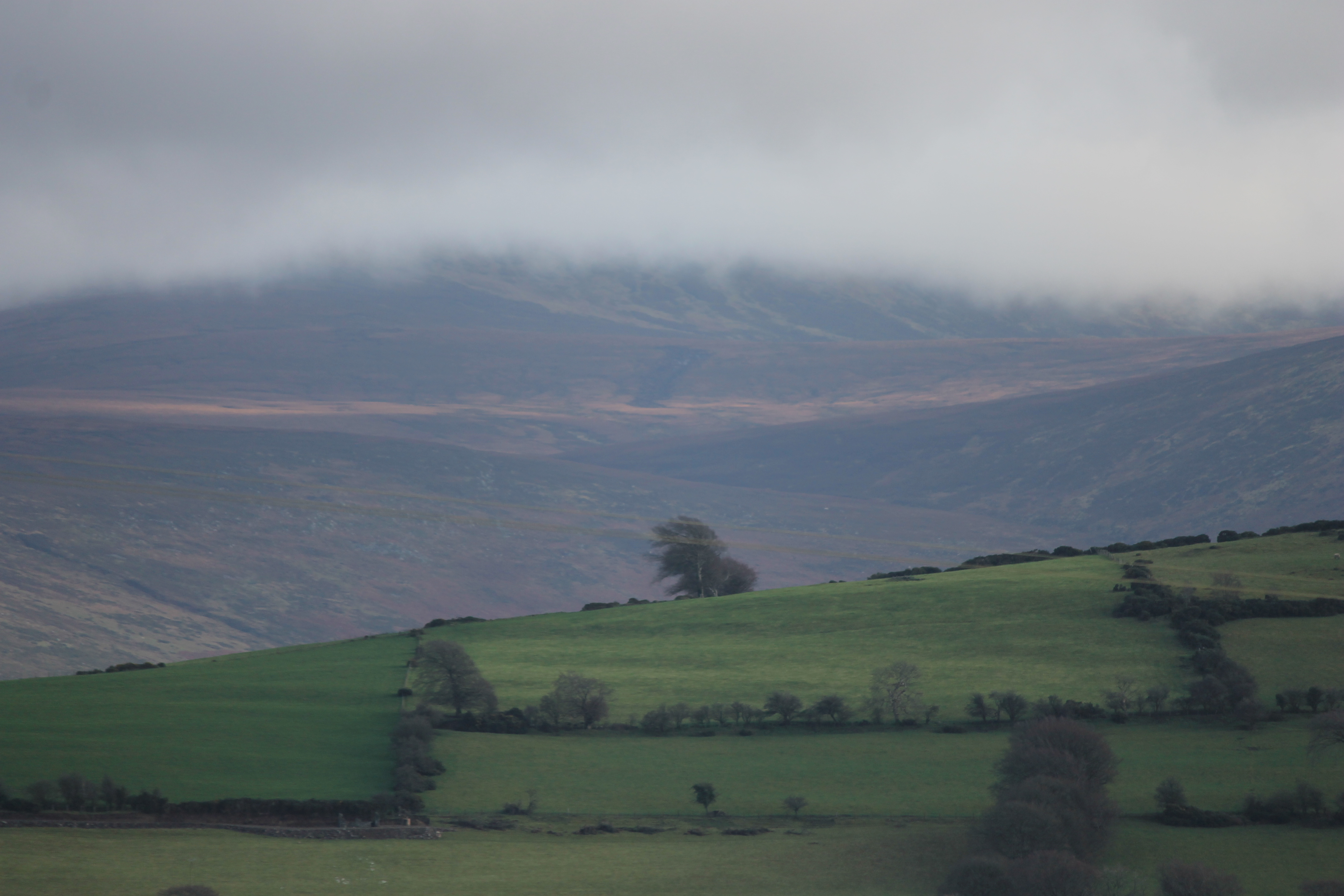
Slopes of Mullaghcleevaun in mist as viewed from the northwest

== Bibliography ==
- Fairbairn, Helen (2014). Ireland's Best Walks: A Walking Guide. Collins Press. ISBN 978-1848892118.
- Fairbairn, Helen (2014). Dublin & Wicklow: A Walking Guide. Collins Press. ISBN 978-1848892019.
- MountainViews Online Database (Simon Stewart) (2013). A Guide to Ireland's Mountain Summits: The Vandeleur-Lynams & the Arderins. Collins Books. ISBN 978-1-84889-164-7.
- Dillion, Paddy (1993). The Mountains of Ireland: A Guide to Walking the Summits. Cicerone. ISBN 978-1852841102.

== See also ==
- Wicklow Way
- Wicklow Round
- Wicklow Mountains
- Lists of mountains in Ireland
- List of mountains of the British Isles by height
- List of Marilyns in the British Isles
- List of Hewitt mountains in England, Wales and Ireland
