= Gravale =

Mountain in County Wicklow, Ireland

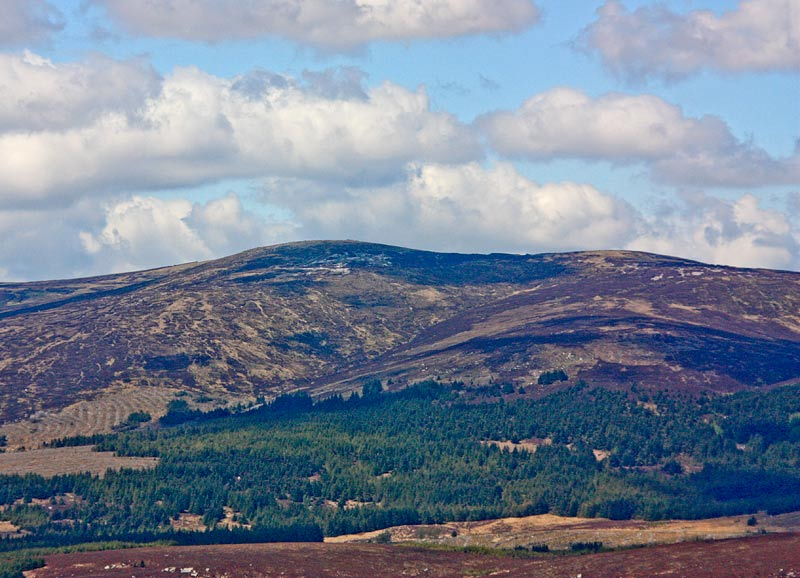
- Gravale (highest) with Carrigvore (right) from SE

Highest point
- Elevation: 718 m (2,356 ft)
- Prominence: 123 m (404 ft)
- Listing: 100 Highest Irish Mountains, Hewitt, Arderin, Simm, Vandeleur-Lynam
- Coordinates: 53°07′N 6°21′W

Naming
- Native name: Droibhéal
- English translation: difficult passage

Geography
- Location within island of Ireland
- Location: County Wicklow, Ireland
- Parent range: Wicklow Mountains
- OSI/OSNI grid: O1049009420
- Topo map: OSi Discovery 56

Geology
- Mountain type: Granite with microcline phenocrysts

Climbing
- Easiest route: from the Sally Gap, or along the R115

Gravale (Irish: Droibhéal, meaning 'difficult passage') at 718 metres (2,356 ft), is the 79th–highest peak in Ireland on the Arderin scale, and the 98th–highest peak on the Vandeleur-Lynam scale. Gravale is in the middle sector of the Wicklow Mountains range, in County Wicklow, Ireland. Gravale sits on a north-east to south-west "boggy ridge" that forms the "central spine" of the whole range, which runs from the Sally Gap, to Carrigvore 682 metres (2,238 ft), to Gravale, and after a col to Duff Hill 720 metres (2,360 ft), which is part of the larger massif of Mullaghcleevaun 849 metres (2,785 ft).

Gravale's prominence of 123 metres (404 ft), does not quality it as a Marilyn, but does rank it the 45th-highest mountain in Ireland on the MountainViews Online Database, 100 Highest Irish Mountains, where the minimum prominence threshold for inclusion on the list is 100 metres.

== Naming ==
According to Irish academic Paul Tempan, the historian Eoin MacNeill, writing in the Journal of the Royal Society of Antiquaries of Ireland (JRSAI), thought that the Irish name "Drobeóil", as listed in the Metrical Dinsenchas, had survived the mountain name "Gravale". Tempan also notes that historical maps of the estates in which Gravale lies suggest that the col between Gravale and Duff Hill was known as "Lavarna" or "Lavarnia", from the Irish "Leath-Bhearna", meaning "half-gap", and that this was likely a difficult trail from the Blessington lakes area to Lough Dan.

== Bibliography ==
- Fairbairn, Helen (2014). Ireland's Best Walks: A Walking Guide. Collins Press. ISBN 978-1848892118.
- Fairbairn, Helen (2014). Dublin & Wicklow: A Walking Guide. Collins Press. ISBN 978-1848892019.
- MountainViews Online Database (Simon Stewart) (2013). A Guide to Ireland's Mountain Summits: The Vandeleur-Lynams & the Arderins. Collins Books. ISBN 978-1-84889-164-7.
- Dillion, Paddy (1993). The Mountains of Ireland: A Guide to Walking the Summits. Cicerone. ISBN 978-1852841102.

== See also ==
- Wicklow Way
- Wicklow Mountains
- Lists of mountains in Ireland
- List of mountains of the British Isles by height
- List of Hewitt mountains in England, Wales and Ireland
