= Wicklow Mountains =

Mountain range in Ireland

- Cuala; Dublin Mountains
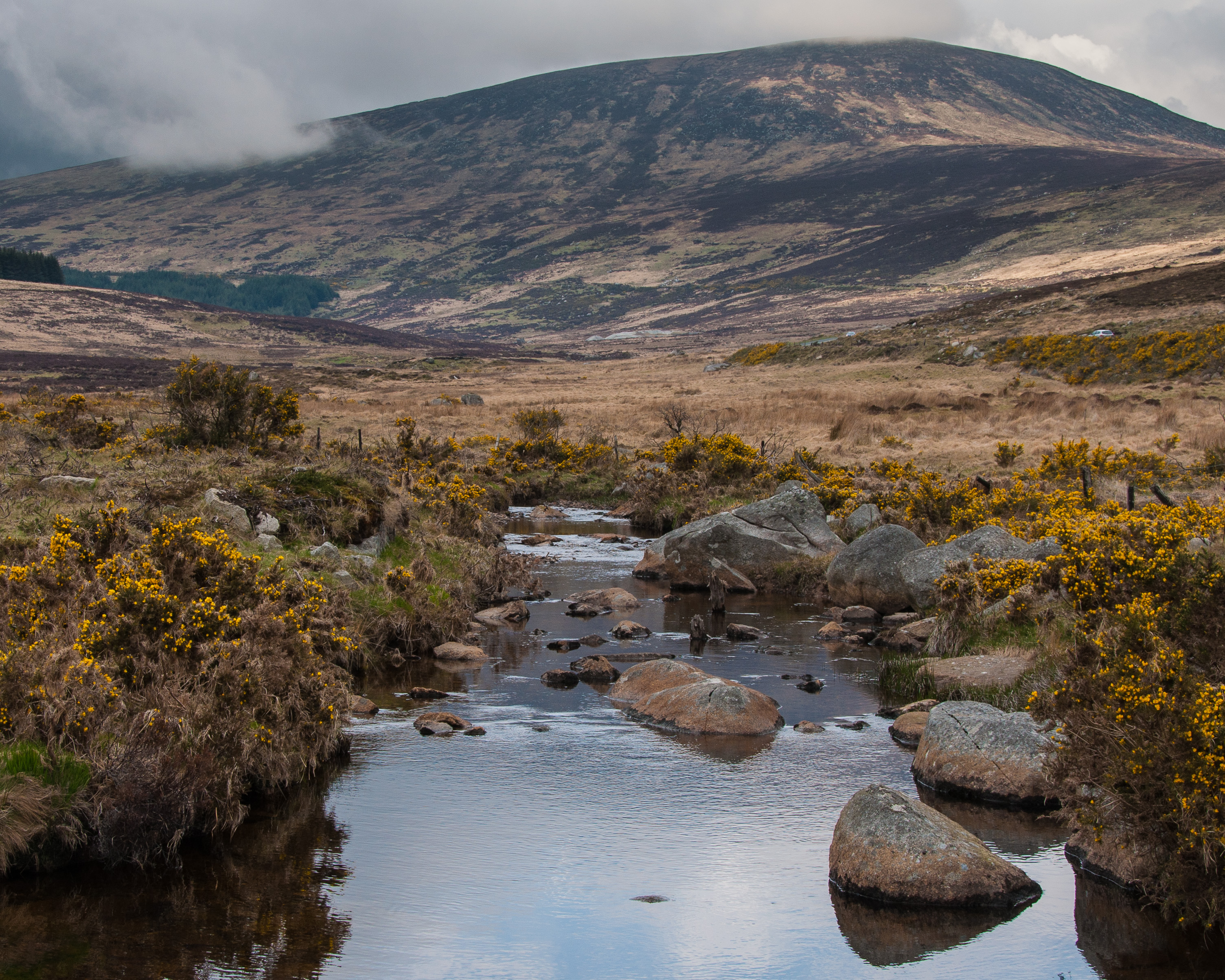
- Tonelagee mountain seen from Glendasan, Wicklow Mountains

Highest point
- Peak: Lugnaquilla
- Elevation: 925 m (3,035 ft)
- Coordinates: 52°57′57″N 6°27′46″W

Naming
- Native name: Sléibhte Chill Mhantáin (Irish)

Geography
- Country: Ireland
- Province: Leinster
- Counties: Wicklow; Dublin; Wexford; Carlow
- Range coordinates: 53°04′52″N 6°23′24″W
- Parent range: Leinster Chain
- Borders on: Blackstairs Mountains

Geology
- Orogeny: Caledonian
- Rock age(s): Cambrian to Devonian, Pleistocene
- Rock types: Granite; mica; schist; quartzite

The Wicklow Mountains (Irish: Sléibhte Chill Mhantáin, archaic: Cualu) form the largest continuous upland area in Ireland. They occupy the whole centre of County Wicklow and stretch outside its borders into the counties of Dublin, Wexford and Carlow. Where the mountains extend into County Dublin, they are known locally as the Dublin Mountains (Sléibhte Bhaile Átha Cliath). The highest peak is Lugnaquilla at 925 metres (3,035 feet).

The mountains are primarily composed of granite surrounded by an envelope of mica-schist and much older rocks such as quartzite. They were pushed up during the Caledonian orogeny at the start of the Devonian period and form part of the Leinster Chain, the largest continuous area of granite in Ireland and Britain. The mountains owe much of their present topography to the effects of the last ice age, which deepened the glens and created corrie and ribbon lakes. Copper and lead have been the main metals mined in the mountains and a brief gold rush occurred in the 18th century. Several major river systems have their source in the mountains, such as the Liffey, Dargle, Slaney and Avoca rivers. Powerscourt Waterfall is the second tallest in Ireland at 121 metres (397 feet). A number of these rivers have been harnessed to create reservoirs for drinking water for Dublin and its surroundings.

The Wicklow Mountains experience a temperate oceanic climate with mild, damp summers and cool, wet winters. The dominant habitat of the uplands consists of blanket bog, heath and upland grassland. The uplands support a number of bird species, including merlin and peregrine falcon. The valleys are a mixture of coniferous and deciduous woodland.

The mountains have been inhabited since Neolithic times and a number of typical monuments, in particular a series of passage tombs, survive to the present day. The monastery at Glendalough, founded in the late 6th century by Saint Kevin, was an important centre of the Early Church in Ireland. Following the Norman invasion in the 12th century, the Wicklow Mountains became a stronghold and hiding place for Irish clans opposed to English rule. The O'Byrne and O'Toole families carried out a campaign of harassment against the settlers for almost five centuries. Later the mountains harboured rebels during the 1798 Rising. Rebel activity died out after the construction of the Wicklow Military Road at the start of the 19th century and the mountains began to attract tourists to the ruins at Glendalough and to admire the mountain scenery.

The Wicklow Mountains continue to be a major attraction for tourism and recreation. The entire upland area is designated as a Special Area of Conservation and as a Special Protection Area under European Union law. The Wicklow Mountains National Park was established in 1991 to conserve the local biodiversity and landscape.

== Name ==
The Wicklow Mountains take their name from County Wicklow which in turn takes its name from Wicklow town. The origin of the name is from the Old Norse Wykynglo or Wykinlo. The Irish name for Wicklow, Cill Mhantáin, means "Church of Mantan", named after an apostle of Saint Patrick. Wicklow was not established as a county until 1606; before that it had been part of County Dublin. During the medieval period, prior to the establishment of County Wicklow, the English administration in Dublin referred to the region as the Leinster Mountains.

An early name for the whole area of the Wicklow Mountains was Cualu, later Cuala. The Irish name for Great Sugar Loaf mountain is Ó Cualann ("lump of Cuala"). There are also historic names for various territories in the mountains held by local clans: the north part of Wicklow and south Dublin was known as Cualann or Fir Chualann ("men of Cuala"), anglicised 'Fercullen', while the Glen of Imaal takes its name from the territory of Uí Máil. A sept of the O'Byrne family called the Gaval Rannall possessed the area around Glenmalure, known as Gaval-Rannall or Ranelagh.

The mountains were also formerly known as Sliabh Ruadh or the Red Mountains.

== Topography ==
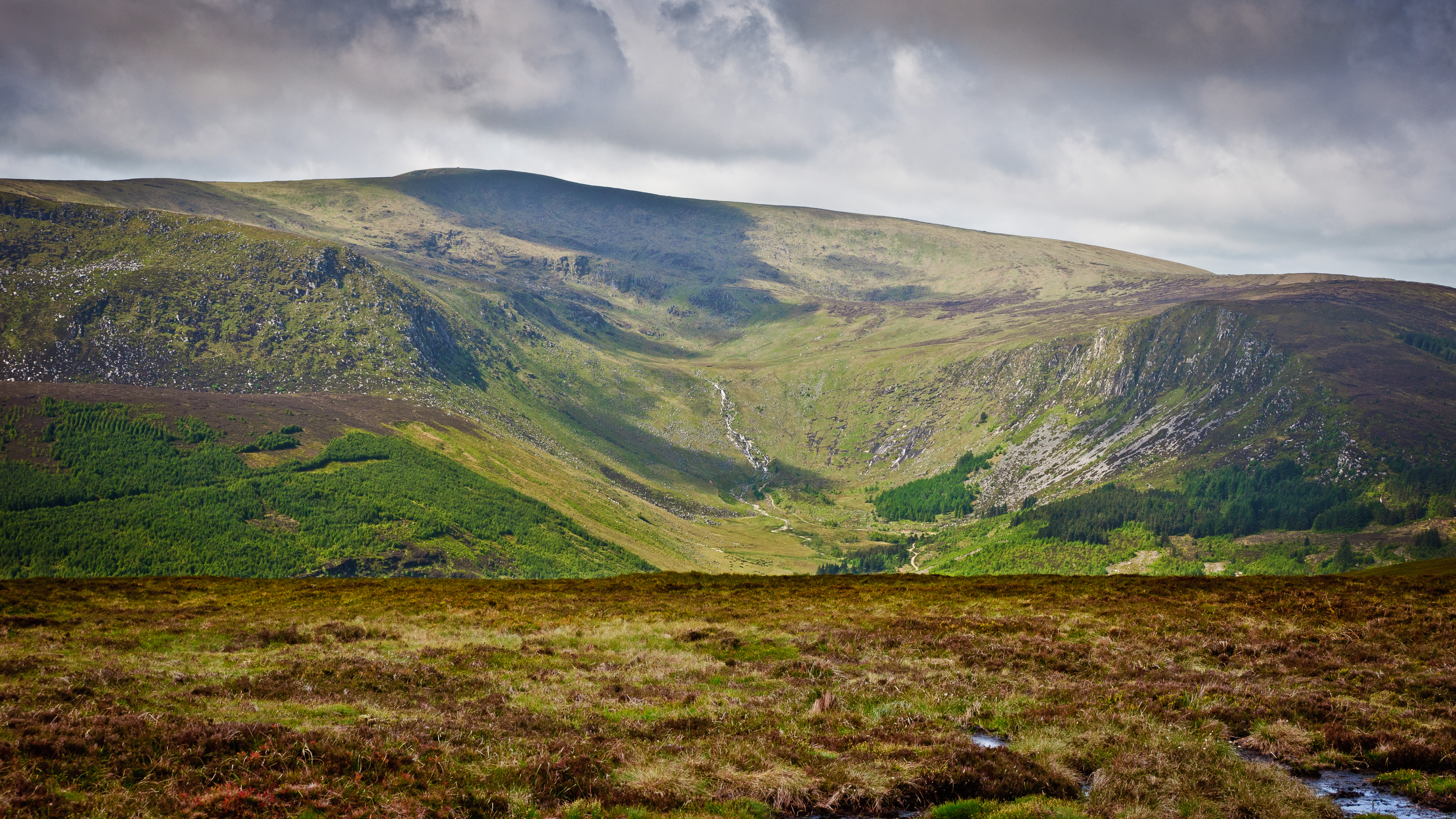
Lugnaquilla, Wicklow's highest mountain

The Wicklow Mountains are the largest area of continuous high ground in Ireland, having an unbroken area of over 500 km^{2} (190 sq mi) above 300 metres (980 ft). They occupy the centre of County Wicklow and extend into Counties Dublin, Carlow and Wexford. The general direction of the mountain ranges is from north-east to south-west. They are formed into several distinct groups: that of Kippure in the north, on the boundary of Dublin and Wicklow; Djouce, Tonelagee, Camaderry and Lugnaquilla in the centre; Church Mountain and Keadeen Mountain in the west; and Croghan Kinsella to the south. To the east, separated from the rest of the range by the Vartry Plateau, is the group comprising the Great Sugar Loaf, Little Sugar Loaf and Bray Head.

Lugnaquilla is the highest peak in the Wicklow Mountains at 925 metres (3,035 feet) and the 13th highest in Ireland. It is also the highest peak in Leinster and is the only Irish Munro to be found outside of Munster. Kippure stands at 757 metres (2,484 feet). There are a total of 39 peaks over 600 metres (2,000 feet) in the Wicklow Mountains. There are only three passes through the mountains under 600 metres (2,000 feet) with the Sally Gap (498 metres (1,634 feet)) and the Wicklow Gap (478 metres (1,567 feet)) being the highest road passes in the country.

== Geology ==
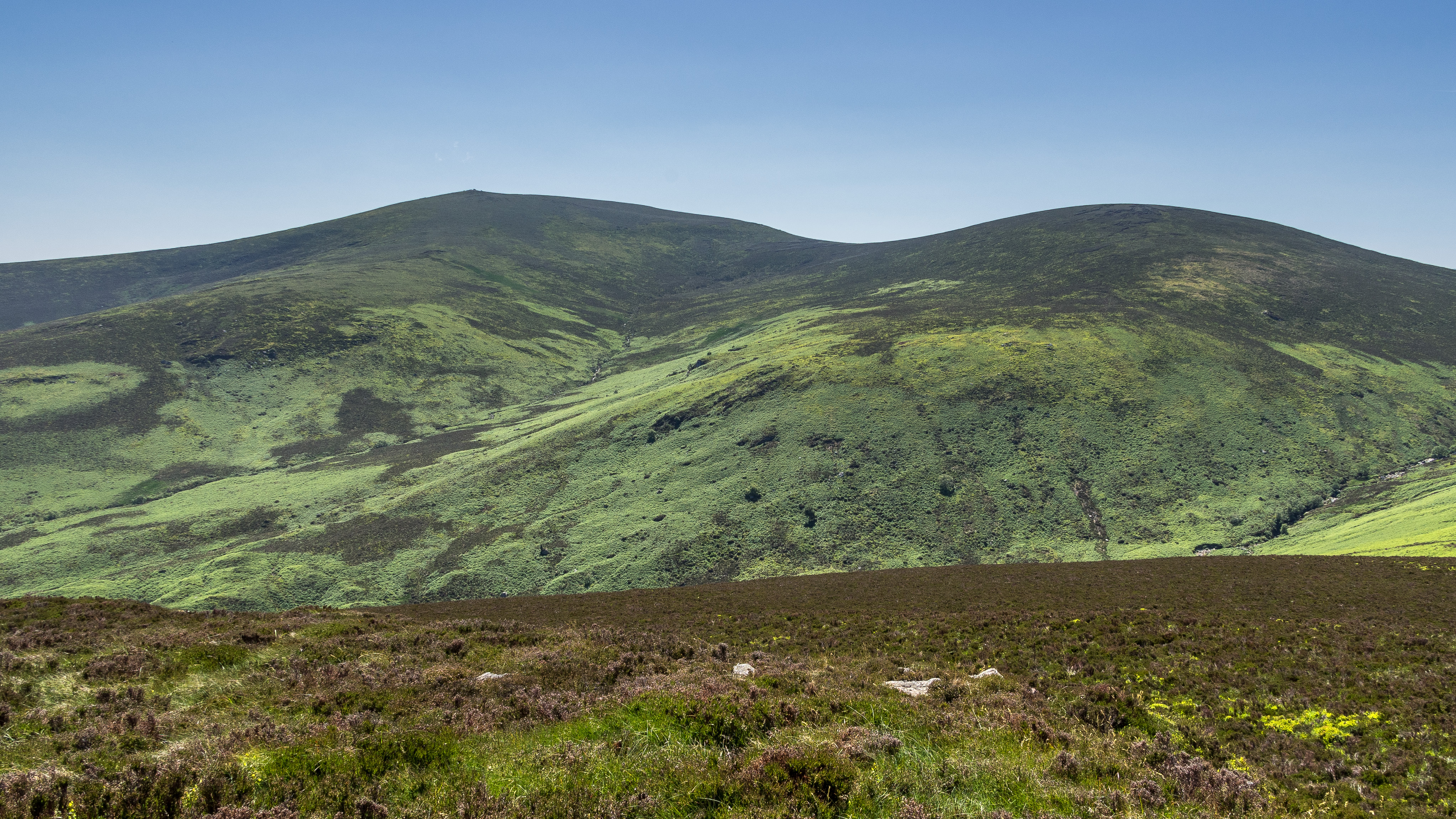
The pointed mica-schist summit of Djouce (left) contrasts with the rounded granite summit of War Hill (right)

The Wicklow Mountains are primarily composed of granite surrounded by an envelope of mica-schist and much older rocks such as quartzite. The oldest rocks are the quartzites of the Bray Group that include Bray Head and the Little Sugar Loaf and Great Sugar Loaf mountains. These metamorphosed from sandstone deposited in the deep waters of the primeval Iapetus Ocean during the Cambrian period (542–488 million years ago). Layers of sediment continued to form slates and shales along the ocean floor mixed with volcanic rock pushed up as Iapetus began to shrink by the process of subduction during the Ordovician period (488–443 million years ago). These rocks now underlie the uplifted peneplain of the Vartry Plateau between the Bray Group and the main range.

The Iapetus Ocean closed up completely at the end of the Silurian period (443–415 million years ago) and the Wicklow Mountains were uplifted during the main phase of the Caledonian orogeny at the start of the Devonian period (415–358 million years ago) when the continents of Baltica and Laurentia collided. The collision pushed up a large batholith of granite, known as the Leinster Chain: this is the largest continuous area of granite in Ireland and Britain and runs from the coast at Dún Laoghaire in County Dublin to New Ross in County Wexford and includes the Wicklow and Blackstairs Mountains. The heat generated by the collision metamorphosed the slates and shales surrounding the granite into schists which formed an aureole (shell) around the granite. The process of erosion has removed much of the surrounding schist from the mountain tops, exposing the underlying granite. Some remnants of the schist roof remain on some of the mountain tops, most notably Lugnaquilla. The round granite-topped peaks contrast with the sharper schist peaks: for example, War Hill (granite) and Djouce (schist).

The twin corrie lakes of Lough Bray on the eastern face of Kippure

The last major geological event to shape the Wicklow Mountains was the Quaternary glaciation during the Pleistocene epoch (2.6 million to 11,700 years ago). The ice deepened and moulded the valleys into the U-shape that characterises the Wicklow Glens, such as Glendalough and Glenmacnass. As the ice melted, small glaciers were left in corries where moraines now dam lakes such as at Loughs Bray and Nahanagan. Corries without lakes also occur, such as the North Prison and South Prison of Lugnaquilla. Escaping meltwater cut narrow rocky gorges at several locations including the Glen of the Downs, the Devil's Glen and The Scalp. Ribbon lakes, such as Lough Dan and the lakes of Glendalough, also formed.

=== Mining and quarrying ===
The zone of collision between the continental plates that led to the formation of the Wicklow Mountains also led to mineralisation and the formation of Ireland's most significant metalliferous belt. The most important mining sites have been at Avoca and Glendalough. Mining has taken place at Avoca since at least the Bronze Age (c. 2,500–600 BCE). Iron ore extraction took place between the 12th and 17th centuries before being replaced by lead mining up to the mid-18th century. The principal activity from 1720 to the closure of the last mine in 1982 was copper extraction. Sulphur has also been extracted at certain times and, in smaller quantities, gold, silver and zinc. Lead mining has been the principal activity in the Glendalough valley and its neighbouring valleys of Glendasan and Glenmalure. Lead was first discovered in Glendasan in the early 19th century and the lead veins were later followed through Camaderry mountain to Glendalough. Mining on a smaller scale took place in Glenmalure. Ore from these mines was shipped to Ballycorus for processing. The last mine closed in 1957.

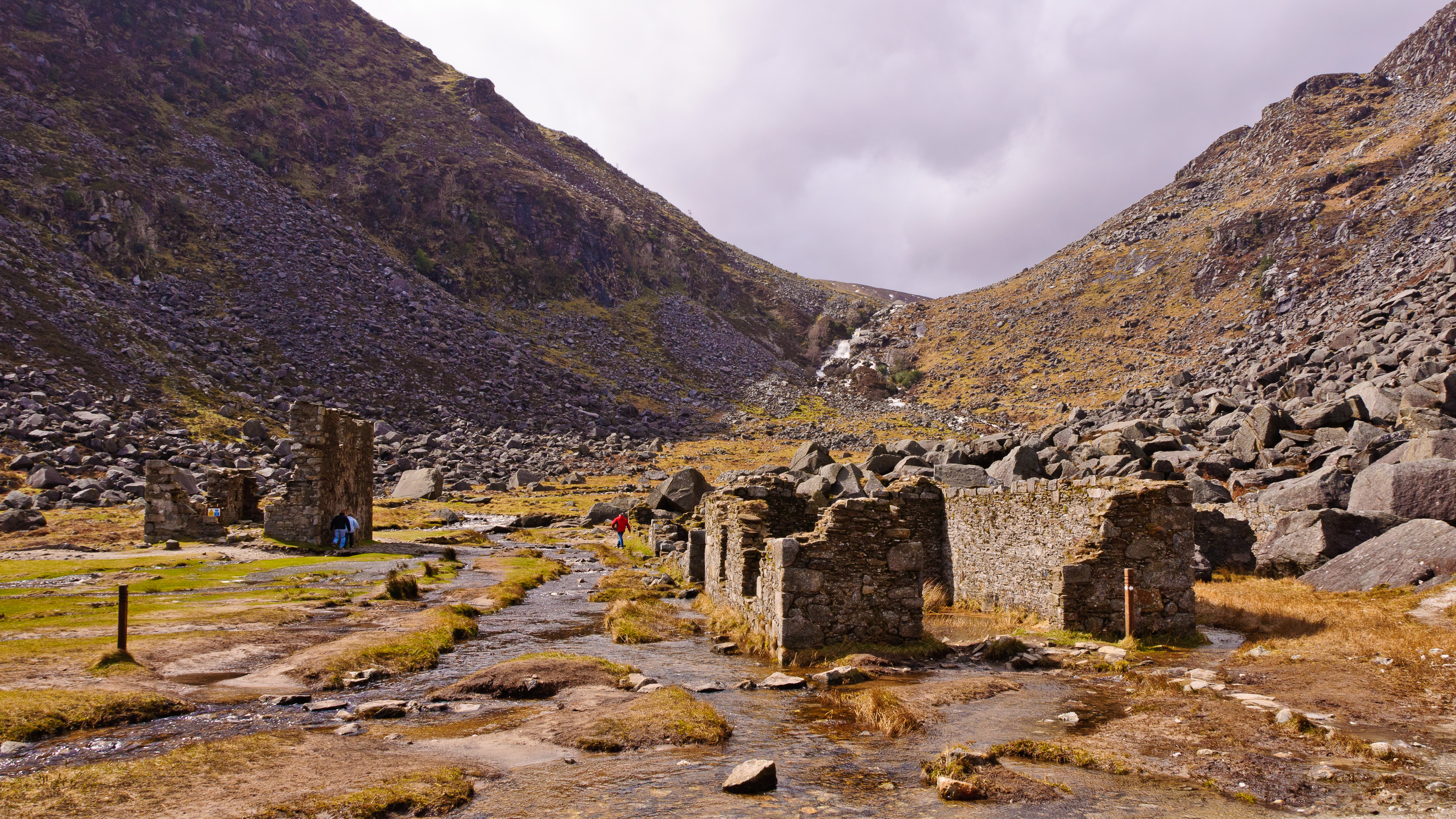
Miners' village in Glendalough

In 1795, workers felling timber discovered gold near the Aughatinavought River, a tributary of the River Aughrim (since renamed the Goldmines River), that rises on the slopes of Croghan Kinsella mountain. During the subsequent gold rush in Wicklow, some 80 kilograms (2,600 troy ounces) of gold was recovered from the river by local prospectors, including a single nugget weighing 682 g (21 7/8 ozt), the largest lump of gold ever discovered in Ireland and Britain. The mine workings were subsequently seized by the British government who extracted a further 300 kg (9,600 ozt) of gold. Various attempts have been made to locate the motherlode on Croghan Kinsella but to no avail.

Granite from the Wicklow Mountains has been used as a material for many buildings in Wicklow, Dublin city and beyond. According to Wyse Jackson and Caulfield, granite was reportedly first quarried in west Wicklow in the early 1700s "from several openings at Baltyboys near Blessington, and from 1740 in more significant volumes at Woodend and Threecastles nearby and then from Golden Hill quarry" near the village of Manor Kilbride. In 1720, Trinity College Dublin accounts show that one John Bawnan was paid £11-10s-7d for "Blessington Stones delivered for work on the new kitchen" there.

From 1824, the quarries at Ballyknockan provided material for buildings such as the Bank of Ireland on College Green in Dublin, Dún Laoghaire lighthouse and Liverpool Cathedral until they closed in the late 20th century. Similarly, quarries at Glencullen and Barnacullia in the "Dublin Mountains" provided stone for such buildings as the G. P. O. on O'Connell Street and the Industry and Commerce building on Kildare Street in Dublin. Barnacullia, on the slopes of Three Rock Mountain, supplied paving stones to Dublin Corporation, and the quarry at Dalkey supplied granite for Dún Laoghaire Harbour and the Thames Embankment in London.

== Hydrology ==
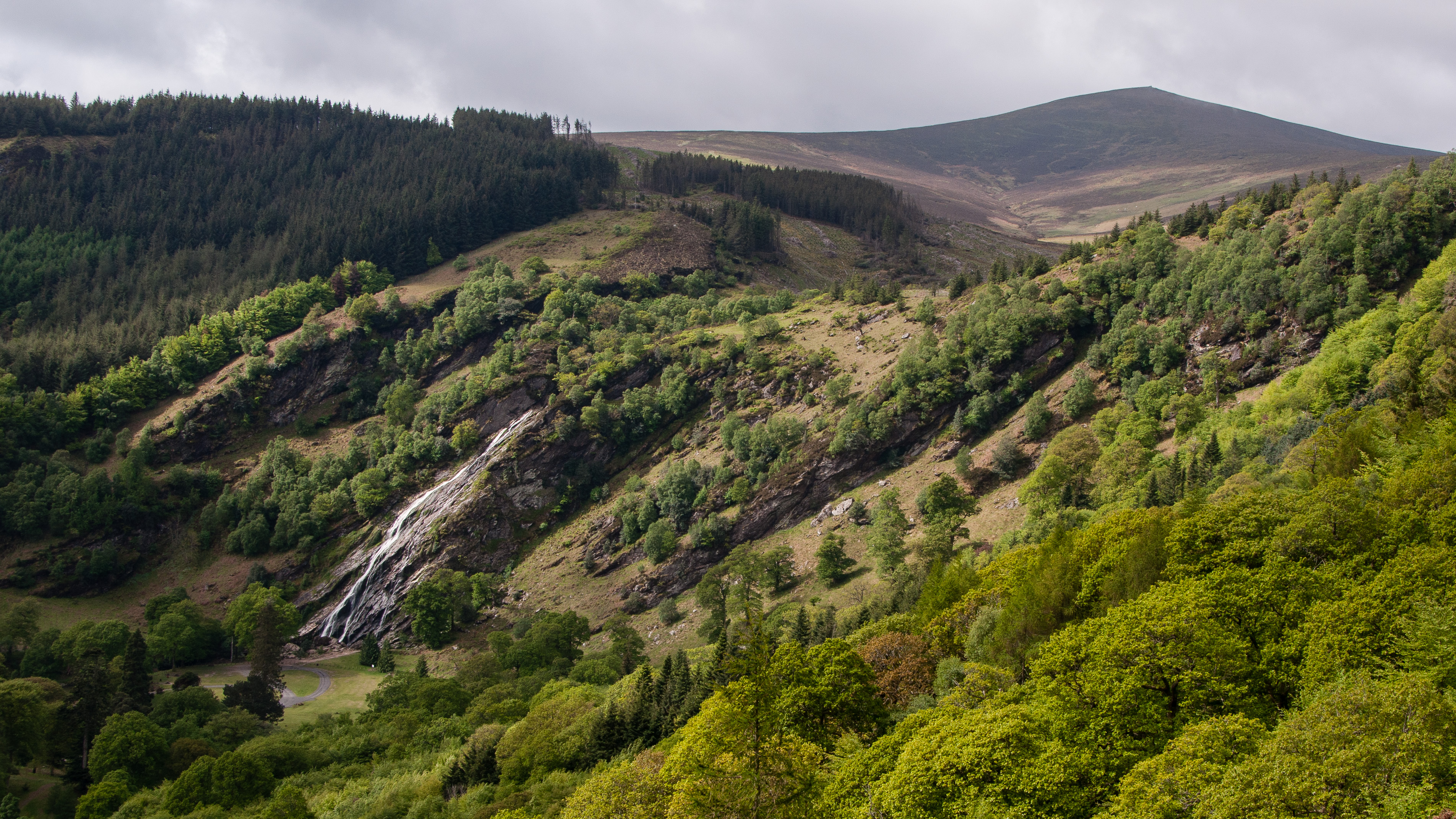
The River Dargle falls as Powerscourt Waterfall, the second tallest waterfall in Ireland

The Wicklow Mountains are the source of several major river systems. Since the thin blanket bog peats cannot hold great quantities of water, many of these rivers exhibit a flashy hydrography, filling rapidly after heavy rain.

The River Liffey rises between the mountains of Kippure and Tonduff at Liffey Head Bog. One of the major tributaries of the Liffey, the River Dodder, rises nearby on slopes on Kippure. The King's River rises on Mullaghcleevaun and joins the Liffey near Blessington.

The River Vartry rises on the slopes of Djouce mountain. Nearby, the River Dargle rises between Tonduff and War Hill, falling as the Powerscourt Waterfall, Ireland's second tallest waterfall at 121 metres (397 feet), over a cliff formed by a glacier at the contact point between the granite and mica-schist of the Wicklow Mountains. The waterfalls at the heads of the valleys of Glendalough, Glenmacnass and Glendasan also occur approximately at the schist-granite junctions, as does the Carrawaystick waterfall in Glenmalure.

The River Slaney rises in the North Prison of Lugnaquilla mountain and winds through the Glen of Imaal where it is joined by the Leoh, Knickeen and Little Slaney. Another of its tributaries, the River Derreen, rises on Lugnaquilla's southern side.

Each of the main branches of the River Avoca—the Avonmore, the Avonbeg and the Aughrim rivers—have their origins in smaller tributaries, many of which rise in the Wicklow Mountains. The Glenealo, Glendasan and Annamoe rivers meet to form the Avonmore near Laragh. The Annamoe rises near Sally Gap and is joined by Cloghoge Brook between Lough Tay and Lough Dan and by the River Inchavore in Lough Dan. The Avonbeg rises on Table Mountain and the Three Lakes. The Avonmore and Avonbeg rivers join to form the River Avoca at the Meeting of the Waters in the Vale of Avoca, celebrated in the song The Meeting of the Waters by Thomas Moore. The Avoca is joined by the River Aughrim at Woodenbridge, sometimes referred to as the "Second Meeting of the Waters". The Aughrim is formed at the junction of the Derry Water and the River Ow, the latter of which rises on Lugnaquilla.

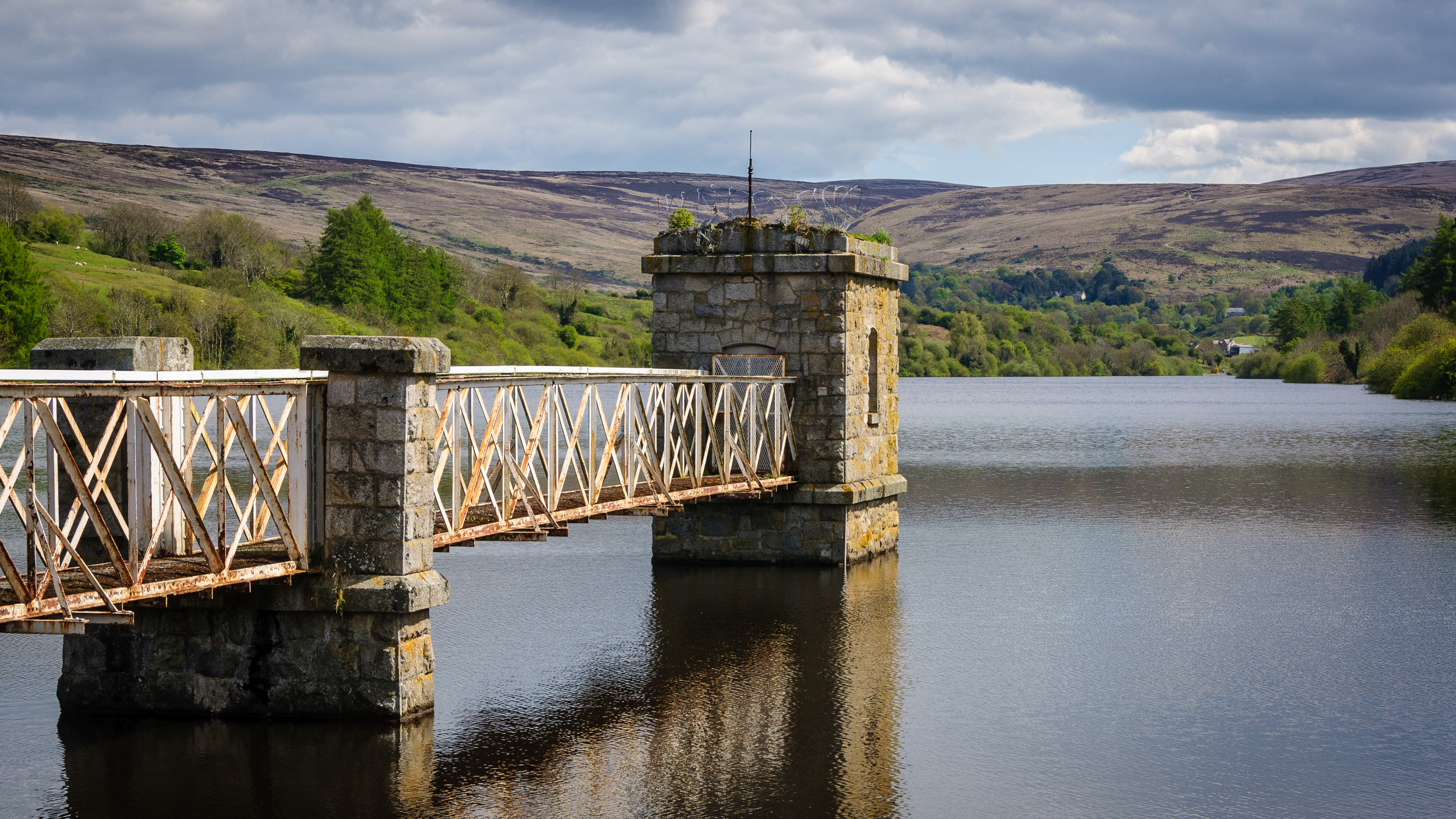
The Bohernabreena Upper Reservoir in the Glenasmole valley

=== Reservoirs ===
Several of these rivers have been dammed to create reservoirs to provide drinking water for the residents of Dublin and its environs. The first of these was the River Vartry, dammed to create the Vartry Reservoir near Roundwood in the 1860s. A second dam was added in 1924 to increase capacity. The River Dodder feeds the two Bohernabreena reservoirs in the northern foothills of the Wicklow Mountains at Glenasmole in County Dublin, which were constructed between 1883 and 1887 to supply water to the townland of Rathmines. The Poulaphouca Reservoir, on the River Liffey near Blessington, was constructed between 1938 and 1940. There are also two hydroelectricity plants at Poulaphouca, constructed during the 1940s. A pumped-storage hydroelectricity plant was constructed at Turlough Hill between 1968 and 1974. Water is pumped up from Lough Nanahangan, a natural corrie lake, into an artificial reservoir on Tomaneena mountain and released at times of peak electricity demand.

== Climate ==
In common with the rest of Ireland, the Wicklow Mountains experience a temperate oceanic climate with mild, damp summers and cool, wet winters. Annual rainfall reaches 2,000 mm (79 inches) on the highest mountains with the more westerly peaks getting the most rainfall. For example, Djouce mountain, in the east, receives approximately 1,630 mm (64 inches), whereas Duff Hill, in the west, receives approximately 1,950 mm (77 inches) a year. June and July are generally the driest months and there is an average of four hours of sunshine a day over the entire year. Snow cover in winter can reach an average of 50 days a year on the highest peaks. Strong winds are an important factor in peat erosion on the summits.

== Habitat ==
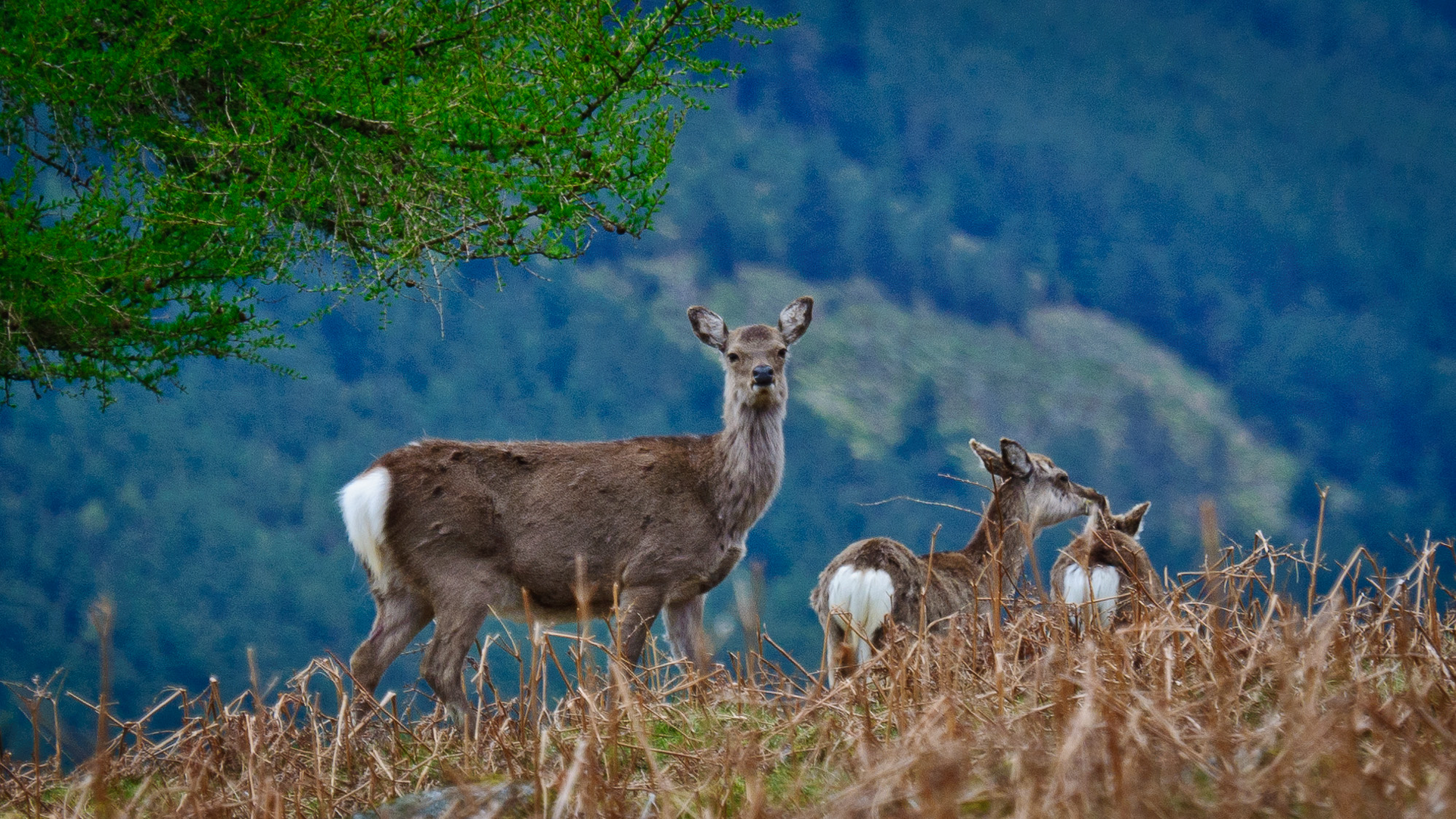
Deer on the slopes of Camaderry Mountain

The primary habitat of the uplands consists of heath and bog. The mountain blanket bogs formed around 4,000 years ago as a result of a combination of climate change and human activity. Prior to this, the mountains were cloaked with pine forest. A change in the climate to wetter and milder weather left the ground waterlogged and leached nutrients from the soil, leading to the formation of peat. Mountain blanket bog is found in areas above 200 metres (660 feet) in altitude and where there are more than 175 days rainfall a year. The most important builders of peat are the Sphagnum bog mosses. Carnivorous plants such as sundews and butterworts are specific to boglands and bog asphodel and bog cotton are also common. Bog water is important for the reproduction of dragonflies and damselflies and the Wicklow mountain bogs also support insects such as pond skaters, whirligig beetles, water boatmen and midges as well as the common frog and the viviparous lizard. Wading birds such as snipes, curlews and golden plover feed in the waterlogged bogland.

Due to drainage of water from the bogs as a result of human activity, most of Wicklow's peat has dried out too much for Sphagnum mosses to grow and moorland and heath vegetation has taken over. Active peat building is still occurring at some sites, most notably the Liffey Head Bog. Common heather (or ling) and bell heather are the most common moorland plants along with bilberry (or fraughan, as it is known in Ireland), bog cotton, deergrass and purple moor grass. Bird species found on the Wicklow moorland include red grouse, meadow pipit and skylark. Birds of prey found in the uplands include kestrels, hen harriers, merlins and peregrine falcons. The latter of these are protected species. The uplands are used for sheep grazing and so the moorland is periodically burned to keep the growth of heather in check and encourage growth of grasses.

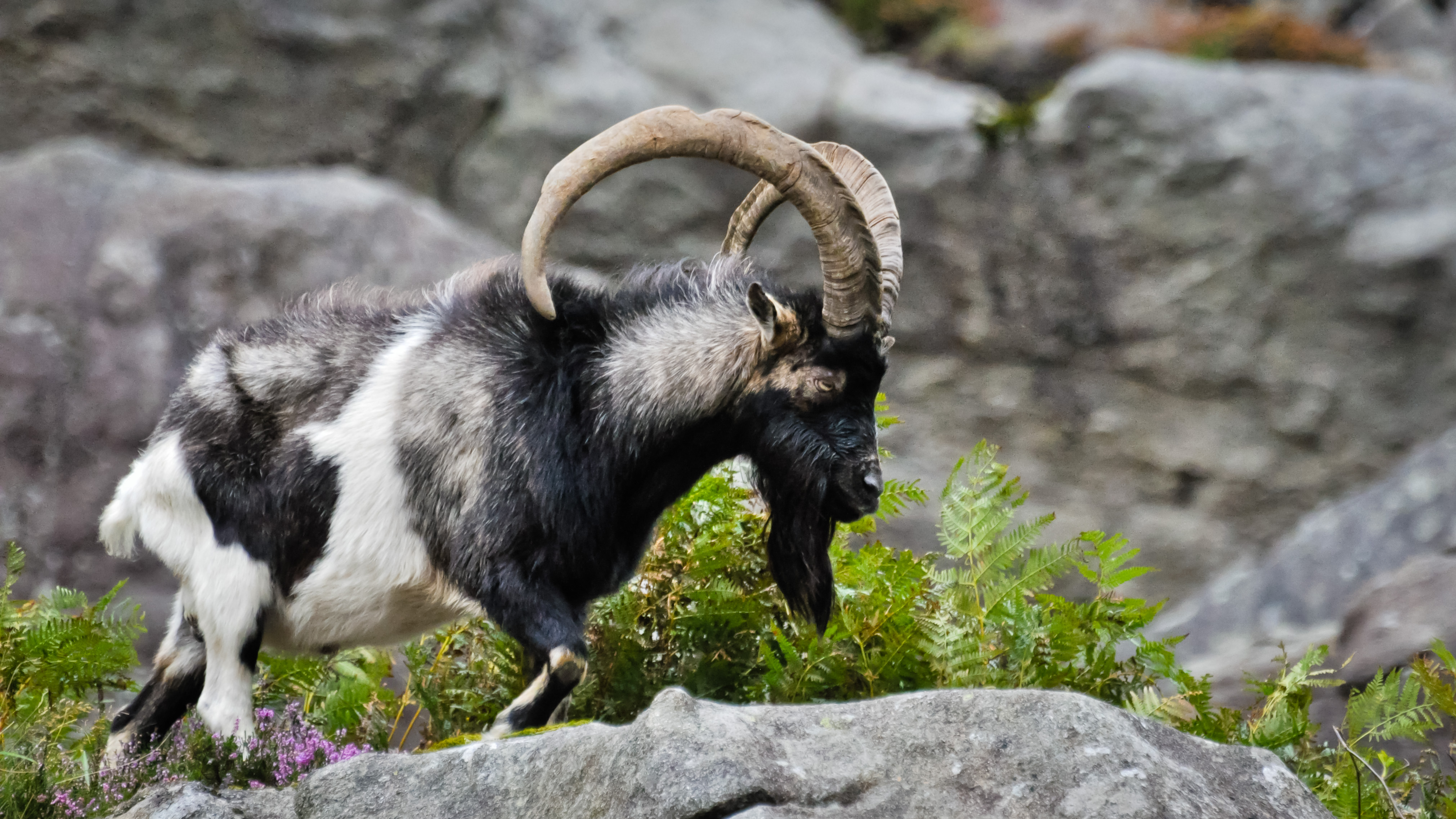
Feral goat in the Glenealo valley

Red deer, once native to Wicklow but hunted to extinction, were reintroduced on the Powerscourt Estate in the 18th century. Japanese sika deer were also imported by the Powerscourt Estate and have interbred with the red deer. All deer found in the Wicklow Mountains are descended from the Powerscourt herd and are either sika deer or hybrid red-sika deer. Other mammals occurring include feral goats, mountain hares, badgers, stoats, otters, red squirrels, grey squirrels and bats. The Irish elk is an extinct species of deer that lived in the Wicklow Mountains c. 11,000 years ago, remains of which were discovered in great quantities in Ballybetagh Bog near Glencullen. Wolves were also once native to the mountains but were hunted to extinction in Ireland: the last wolf in Wicklow was killed at Glendalough in 1710.

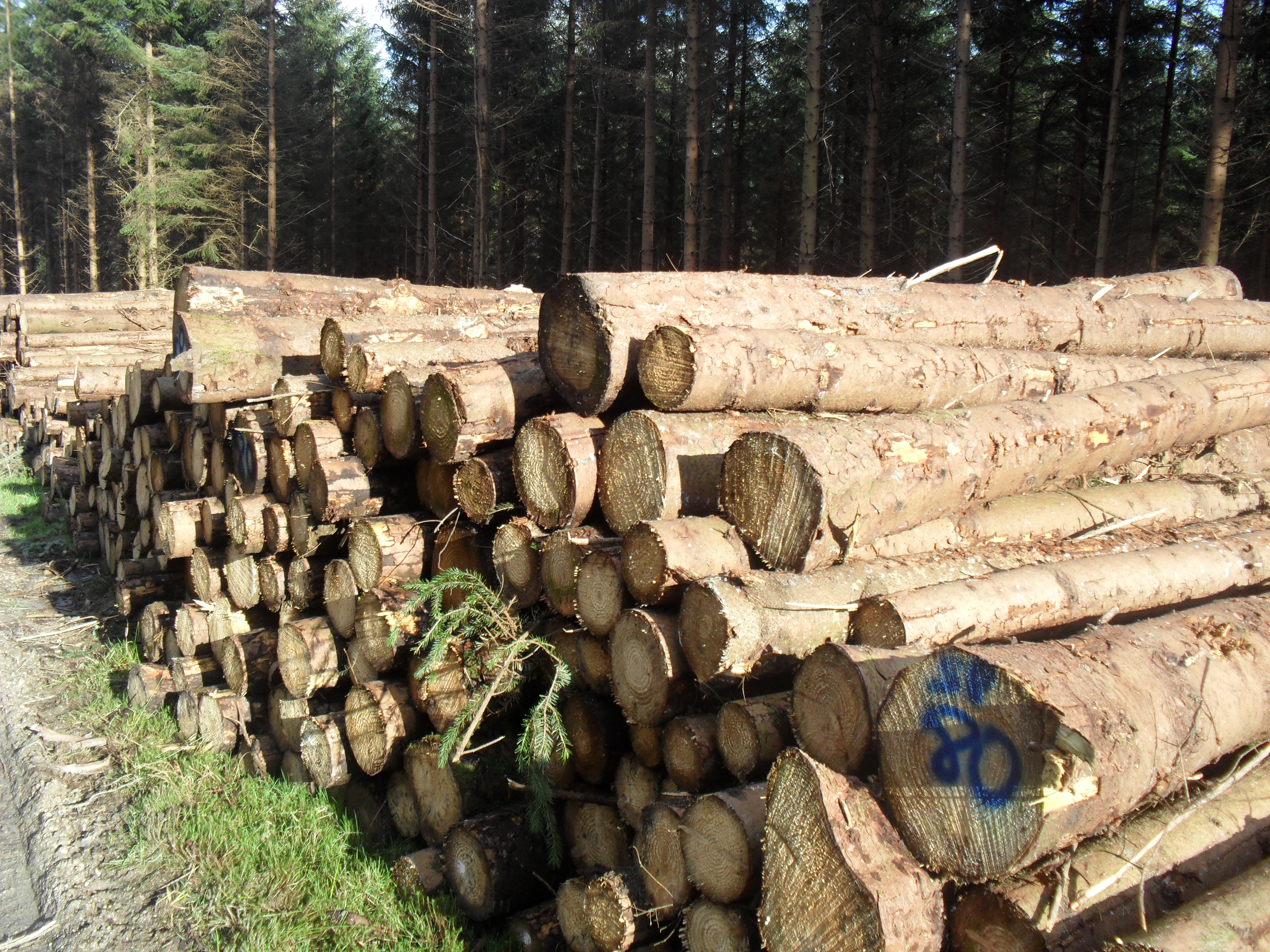
Pile of cut trees in the Wicklow Mountains

Widespread clearance of forest began in the Bronze Age and continued up until the early 20th century. Afforestation programmes began in the 1920s and accelerated in the 1950s with the widespread planting of conifer forest, especially in upland moorland areas previously considered unsuitable for planting. The dominant tree is the sitka spruce, accounting for 58% of forest plantations, with lodgepole pine, Norway spruce, Scots pine, larch and Douglas fir also planted. Biodiversity is low in the conifer plantations because they are not native tree species. Broadleaf plantations are rare, accounting for less than 10% of forest.

The young rivers in the upper glens are spawning grounds for salmon and brown trout. Arctic char, isolated in the Wicklow lakes following the end of the last ice age, have been recorded in Lough Dan and the lakes of Glendalough but are now believed extinct. A programme to reintroduce them into the Upper Lake at Glendalough commenced in 2009.

== History ==
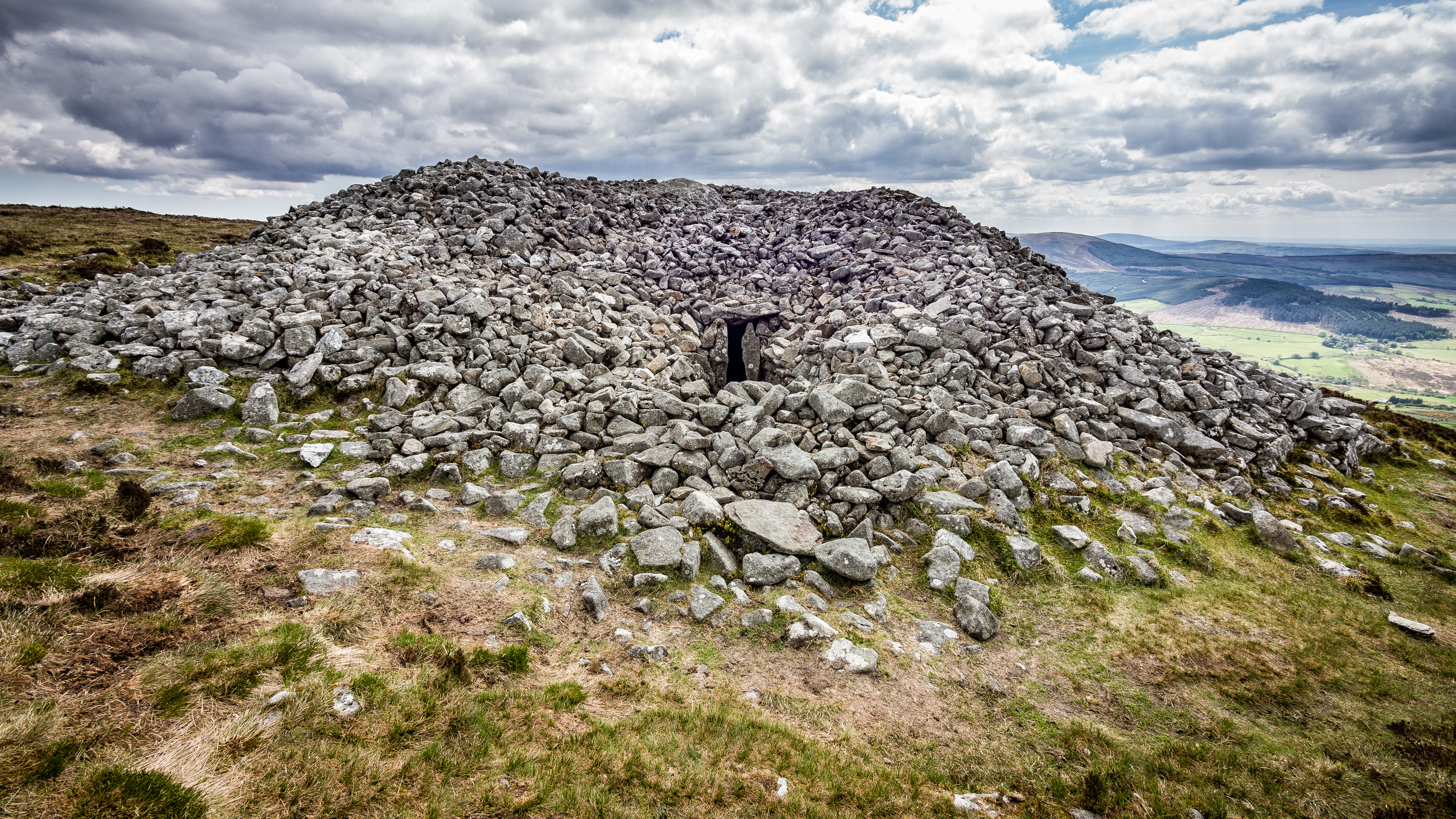
The Neolithic passage tomb on the summit of Seefin Mountain

The earliest evidence of human activity in the interior of Wicklow dates to around 4,300 BCE. Passage tombs, from the Neolithic period, are the earliest and most prominent feature of prehistoric Irish civilisation in the Wicklow Mountains. These tombs sit on many of the western and northern summits between Saggart in Dublin and Baltinglass in Wicklow, such as at Seefin and Seefingan. Archaeologist Geraldine Stout has suggested they had a territorial marking function, much like modern-day border posts. Other prehistoric monuments to be found in the uplands include stone circles, standing stones and rock art. The presence of standing stones at altitudes suggests they may have served route-marking purposes. The largest complex of hill forts in Ireland is to be found on the hills near Baltinglass.

The earliest known tribes to have controlled the Wicklow Mountains include the Dál Messin Corb, the Uí Mail, the Uí Theig and the Uí Briúin. One member of the Dál Messin Corb was Saint Kevin, who founded the monastery at Glendalough in the latter part of the 6th century. Kevin travelled to Glendalough from Hollywood, crossing the mountains via the Wicklow Gap. By the 8th century, Glendalough had grown into a substantial settlement of 500–1,000 people and an important site of learning and pilgrimage. Monasteries were often attacked, especially at times of disease or famine, and Glendalough's wealth made it a frequent target for both local tribes and, later, Norse invaders. The monastery declined in importance after the arrival of the Normans in the 12th century and its subsequent annexation to the Archdiocese of Dublin. It was burned by the English in 1398, although settlement there continued until the end of the 16th century. There are also important early Irish church sites in the Dublin foothills of the Wicklow Mountains at Rathmichael and Tully.

In 1170, during the Norman invasion of Ireland, Strongbow and Dermot MacMurrough successfully laid siege to Dublin by following a high route through the Wicklow Mountains, avoiding the defences along the normal route to the west of the mountains. The Norman invasion displaced two important Gaelic clans from Kildare, the O'Byrnes and the O'Tooles, who moved into the Wicklow Mountains, the O'Byrnes in the east and the O'Tooles in the west. From their mountain strongholds both families conducted a persistent campaign of harassment against the invaders and the Wicklow Mountains became known as the terra guerre ("land of war"), as opposed to the terra pacis ("land of peace") of the settled lowlands.

The valley of Glenmalure provided an almost unassailable refuge for the clans and English forces suffered heavy defeats there, first in 1274 and again in 1580 in the Battle of Glenmalure. The latter defeat was at the hands of Fiach McHugh O'Byrne, who led many attacks against the English and assisted in the escapes of many of the hostages held by the English to guarantee the loyalty of the Irish clans. One such hostage was Red Hugh O'Donnell, who escaped from Dublin Castle on the night of 6 January 1592 in the company of Art O'Neill. The two men crossed the mountains in blizzard conditions, making for Fiach McHugh O'Byrne's stronghold at Glenmalure. Art O'Neill died from exposure during the journey and Red Hugh had several toes amputated due to frostbite. A cross and a plaque to the north of Conavalla mountain mark the place where Art O'Neill perished and an annual walk named the Art O'Neill Challenge is now held following in the two men's footsteps. The O'Byrnes' and O'Tooles' dominance finally came to an end with the Act of Succession of 1652 when their land was confiscated by the English Commonwealth.

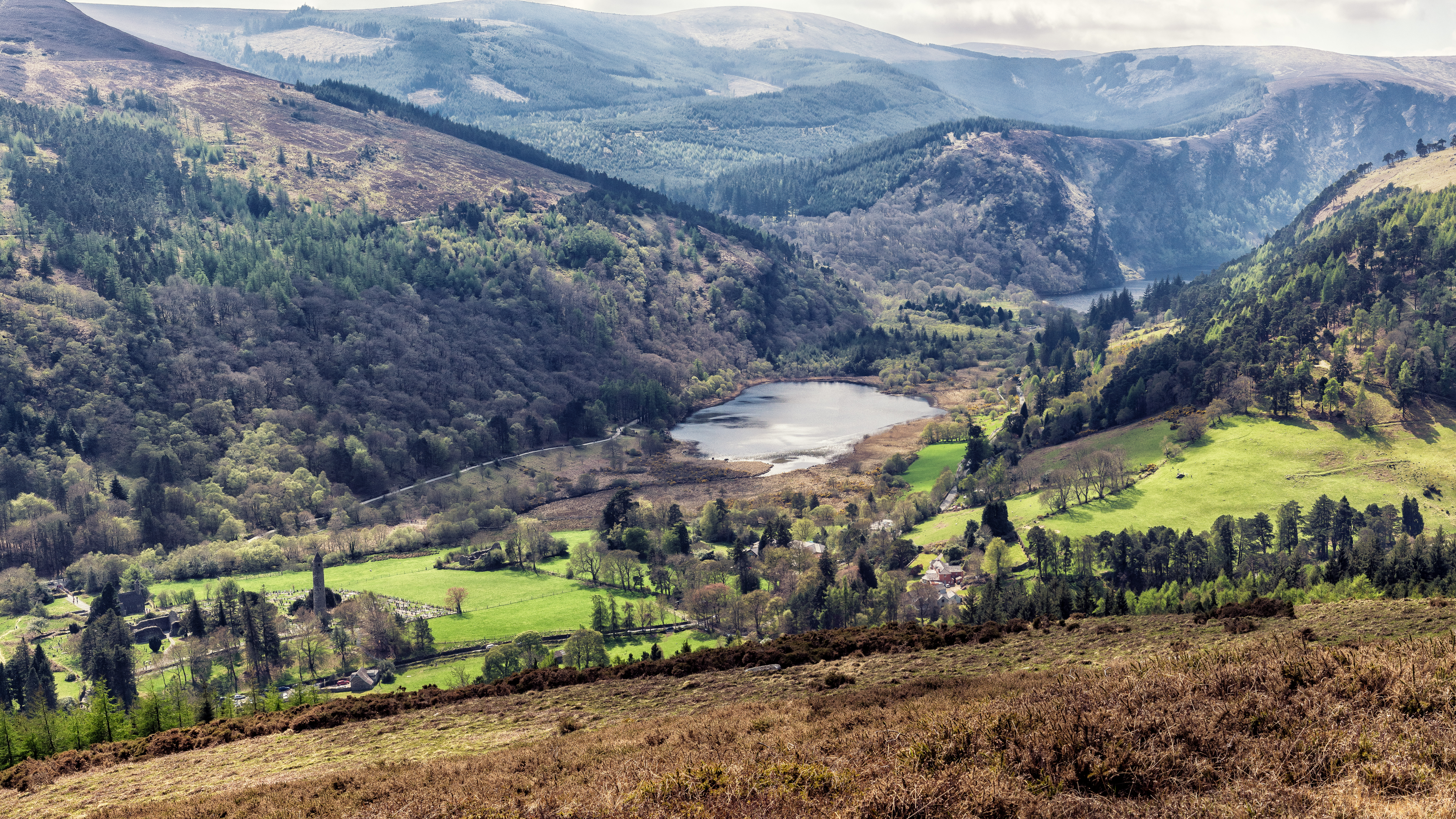
Glendalough Valley, showing the Monastic City, the Lower Lake and the Upper Lake

A prolonged period of peace reigned in the Wicklow Mountains from the end of the Cromwellian period until the Irish Rebellion of 1798. Although the main rebellion was quickly defeated, Irish rebels once again used the Wicklow Mountains as a hiding place and stronghold to attack the English for many years afterwards. Among their number was Michael Dwyer, a native of the Wicklow Mountains, born in the townland of Camara in the Glen of Imaal, and General Joseph Holt. Both men eventually surrendered and were transported to Australia. Determined to prevent any future rebel activity, a military road through the mountains, similar to those built in the Scottish Highlands to quell the Jacobite risings, was proposed by the British government to enable troops to be deployed quickly into the region. The Wicklow Military Road was constructed between 1800 and 1809 and runs from Rathfarnham, County Dublin to Aghavannagh, County Wicklow via Glencree, the Sally Gap and Laragh. A series of army barracks and police stations were built along the route, although they were little used and soon fell into disrepair as the Wicklow Mountains soon ceased to be a centre of rebel activity after the road was completed.

The census of 1841 recorded a population of 13,000 in the Wicklow uplands out of 126,143 persons in the county as a whole. Following the Great Famine, the census of 1891 showed that the population of County Wicklow had declined to 62,136 with the proportionate fall in the uplands regions even greater as the populace deserted the marginal lands.

The construction of the railways in the 19th century led to the development of tourism in the Wicklow Mountains. Visitors were taken by horse-drawn transport into the mountains from the railway station at Rathdrum. Glendalough quickly established itself as the most popular tourist destination and a train service there was considered in 1897 but the proposals came to nothing. The tourism potential of the Military Road was spotted soon after its completion and G. N. Wright's Tours in Ireland (1822) is one of the earliest guides to the sights along the route.

== Present day ==
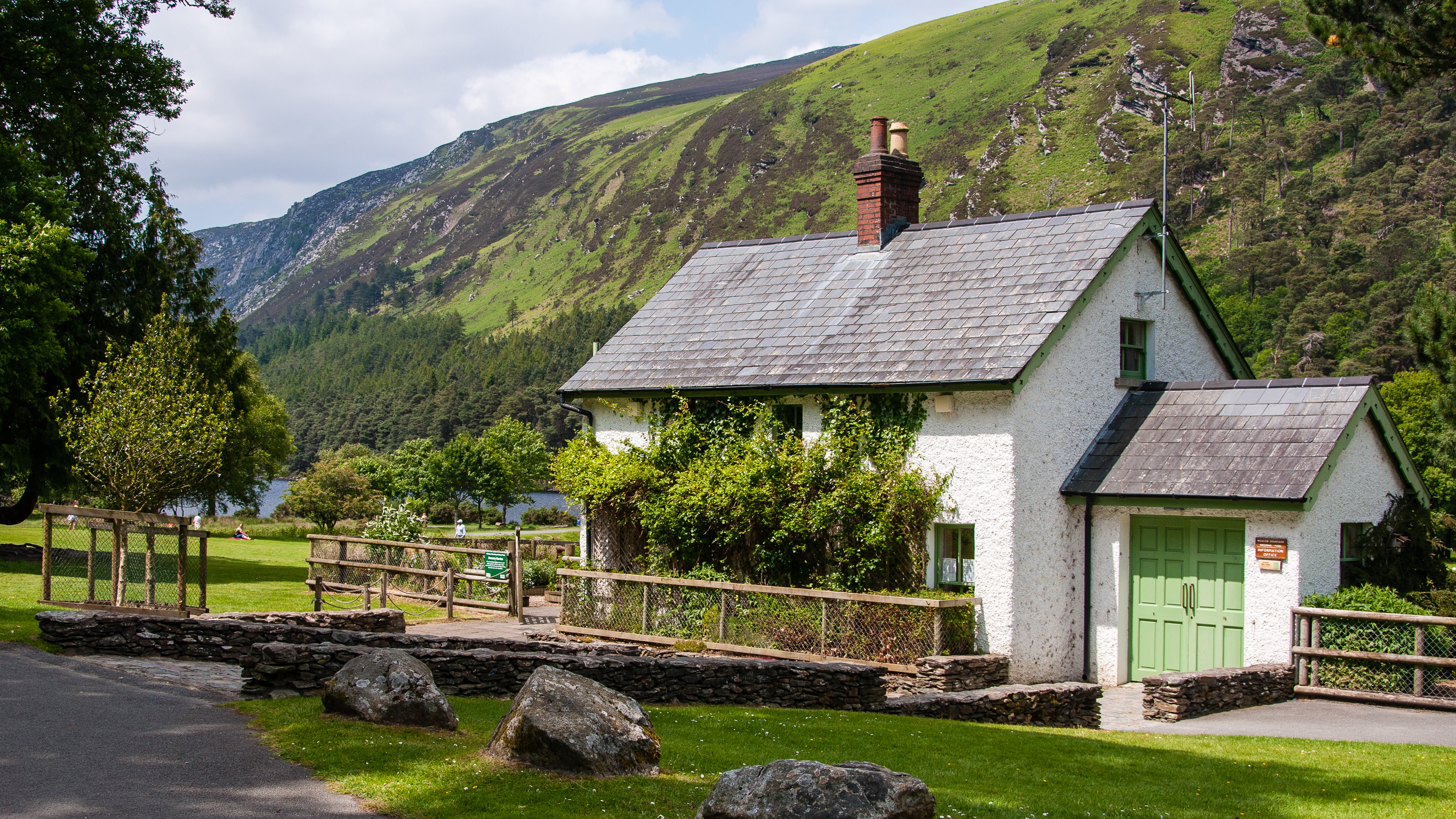
The Wicklow Mountains National Park information office in Glendalough

The principal farming activity in the uplands is sheep grazing, using mainly the Wicklow Cheviot breed. Land is also used for forestry and turf cutting. Tourism and recreation are also major activities in the uplands. Glendalough remains the most popular destination, receiving around one million visitors each year. Recreational activities in the mountains include walking, rock climbing, winter climbing, fishing and cycling. Hillwalking in the Wicklow Mountains was first popularised by J. B. Malone through a weekly column he wrote in the Evening Herald newspaper. Malone was later instrumental in the creation of the Wicklow Way, Ireland's first National Waymarked Trail, which opened in 1980 and crosses the Wicklow Mountains. The Wicklow Way has been joined by the Dublin Mountains Way and the Saint Kevin's Way pilgrim path, both of which also traverse parts of the mountains.

On foot of concerns about environmental degradation and undesirable development of the Wicklow Uplands, the Government announced the creation of the Wicklow Mountains National Park in 1990 to conserve the area's biodiversity and landscape. The park was officially established in 1991 and now encompasses an area of over 20,000 hectares (200 square kilometres; 77 square miles). In addition, the Wicklow Mountains (including areas outside the National Park) are classed as a Special Area of Conservation under the EU Habitats Directive and as a Special Protection Area under the EU Birds Directive.

The Dublin foothills of the Wicklow Mountains are managed by the Dublin Mountains Partnership (DMP), a group established in May 2008 with the aim of improving the recreational experience of users of the Dublin Mountains. Its members include representatives of state agencies, local authorities and recreational users. The DMP has restored paths and developed walking trails, orienteering courses and a mountain biking course.

== See also ==
- Wicklow Round
- Wicklow Way
- Lists of mountains in Ireland
- List of mountains of the British Isles by height
- List of Marilyns in the British Isles
- List of Hewitt mountains in England, Wales and Ireland
