= Duff Hill =

Mountain in County Wicklow, Ireland

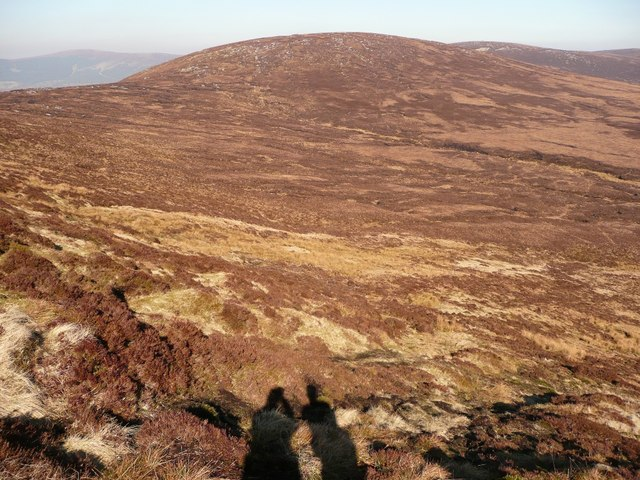
- Summit viewed from the south

Highest point
- Elevation: 720 m (2,360 ft)
- Prominence: 65 m (213 ft)
- Listing: Hewitt, Arderin, Simm, Vandeleur-Lynam
- Coordinates: 53°07′N 6°22′W

Naming
- Native name: Cnoc Dubh
- English translation: black hill

Geography
- Location within island of Ireland
- Location: County Wicklow, Ireland
- Parent range: Wicklow Mountains
- OSI/OSNI grid: O093082
- Topo map: OSi Discovery 56

Geology
- Mountain type: Granite with microcline phenocrysts

Duff Hill (Irish: An Cnoc Dubh, meaning 'black hill') at 720 metres (2,360 ft), is the 78th-highest peak in Ireland on the Arderin scale, and the 97th-highest peak on the Vandeleur-Lynam scale. Duff Hill is in the middle section of the Wicklow Mountains, in County Wicklow, and is part of the large massif of Mullaghcleevaun 849 metres (2,785 ft), which lies to its south. Gravale, which is 718 metres (2,356 ft) tall, lies to its immediate north.

== Bibliography ==
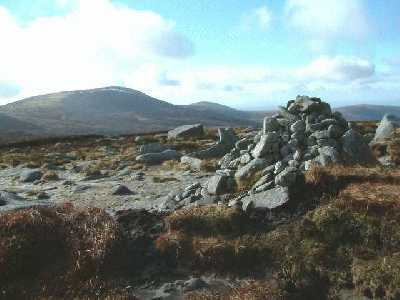
Summit cairn with the north face of Mullaghcleevaun in background

- Fairbairn, Helen (2014). Ireland's Best Walks: A Walking Guide. Collins Press. ISBN 978-1848892118.
- Fairbairn, Helen (2014). Dublin & Wicklow: A Walking Guide. Collins Press. ISBN 978-1848892019.
- MountainViews Online Database (Simon Stewart) (2013). A Guide to Ireland's Mountain Summits: The Vandeleur-Lynams & the Arderins. Collins Books. ISBN 978-1-84889-164-7.
- Dillion, Paddy (1993). The Mountains of Ireland: A Guide to Walking the Summits. Cicerone. ISBN 978-1852841102.

== See also ==
- Wicklow Way
- Wicklow Mountains
- Lists of mountains in Ireland
- List of mountains of the British Isles by height
- List of Hewitt mountains in England, Wales and Ireland
