= Kippure =

Mountain in Dublin, Ireland

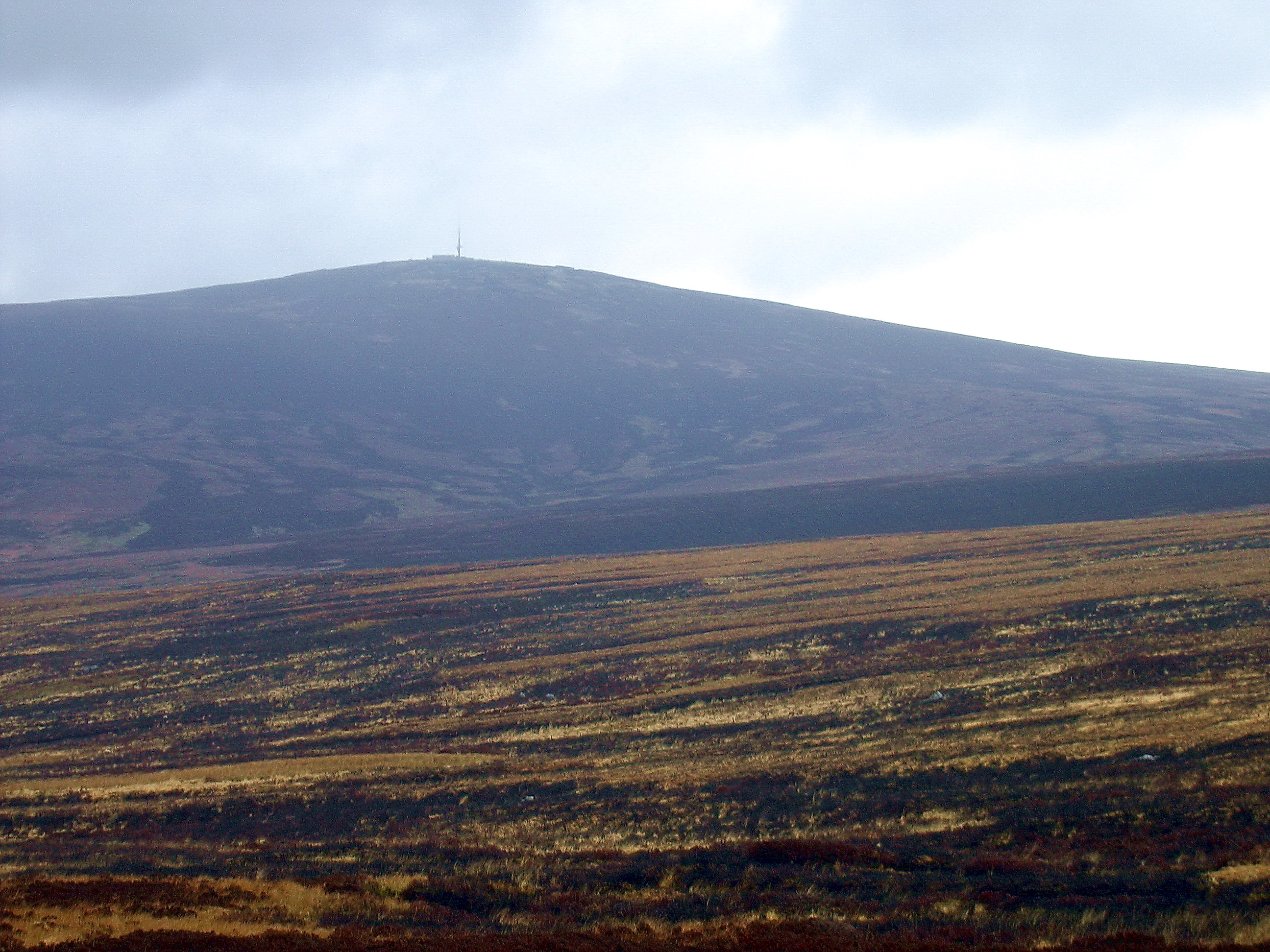
- Kippure, southern slopes with the transmission mast visible on the summit

Highest point
- Elevation: 757 m (2,484 ft)
- Prominence: 262 m (860 ft)
- Listing: County Top (Dublin), 100 Highest Irish Mountains, Marilyn, Hewitt, Arderin, Simm, Vandeleur-Lynam
- Coordinates: 53.178°N 6.332°W

Naming
- Native name: Cipiúr
- English translation: Kippure

Geography
- Location within island of Ireland
- Location: Counties Wicklow & South Dublin, Ireland
- Parent range: Wicklow Mountains
- OSI/OSNI grid: O1158215455
- Topo map: OSi Discovery 56

Geology
- Mountain type: Pale grey fine to coarse-grained granite

Climbing
- Easiest route: Eastern path from the R115 Road (the "Military Road")

Kippure (/kɪˈpjʊər/; Irish: Cipiúr) at 757 metres (2,484 ft), is the 56th-highest peak in Ireland on the Arderin scale, and the 72nd-highest peak on the Vandeleur-Lynam scale. Kippure is situated in the far northern sector of the Wicklow Mountains, where it lies on the border of counties Dublin and Wicklow in Ireland. Kippure is the County Top for Dublin, and its height and positioning over Dublin city have made its summit an important site for transmission masts, which are highly visible from a distance. Kippure's slopes feed into the Liffey Head Bog which forms the source of the River Liffey. The summit can be easily accessed from the east via a path that lies off the R115 (also called the "Military Road") road along the route to the Sally Gap.

== Naming ==
According to Irish academic Paul Tempan, "Kippure" is simply a "transliteration of a pronunciation collected locally, but without any clear meaning". Tempan notes that it resembles the Irish language term "ciop" (meaning stump) and "iúr" (meaning yew), however "stump of the yew" would be "Ciop Iúir". While it is unlikely that yew trees could have ever grown on an exposed mountain such as Kippure, Tempan notes that there is a connection with a similar name in the lower valley, where the association with yew trees could have come.

== Geography ==
Kippure's large massif sits at the head of two major valleys: the valley of Glencree (part of County Wicklow) to the east, which it forms with Tonduff 642 metres (2,106 ft), Maulin 570 metres (1,870 ft), and Prince William's Seat 555 metres (1,821 ft); and the valley of Glenasmole (part of Dublin) to the north, which is forms with Seefingan 724 metres (2,375 ft), and Corrig Mountain 617 metres (2,024 ft).

To the south of Kippure is the high mountain pass of the Sally Gap at 503 metres (1,650 ft), and the long winding "central spine" of the Wicklow Mountains as the range runs to Mullaghcleevaun 849 metres (2,785 ft), and then on to Tonelagee 817 metres (2,680 ft), and finally to the terminus at Lugnaquilla 925 metres (3,035 ft) in the south, County Wicklow and Leinster's highest mountain.

Kippure has two corrie lakes on its north-east flank, Lough Bray Upper and Lough Bray Lower. The slopes of Kippure hold the sources of several rivers, including tributaries that feed the River Liffey from the Liffey Head Bog on the western slopes of Tonduff, and tributaries that feed the River Dodder.

Kippure's prominence of 262 metres (860 ft) qualifies it as a Marilyn, and it also ranks it as the 32nd-highest mountain in Ireland on the MountainViews Online Database, 100 Highest Irish Mountains, where the minimum prominence threshold is 100 metres (330 ft).

On very clear days, Kippure can be seen from Wales.

== Transmission site ==
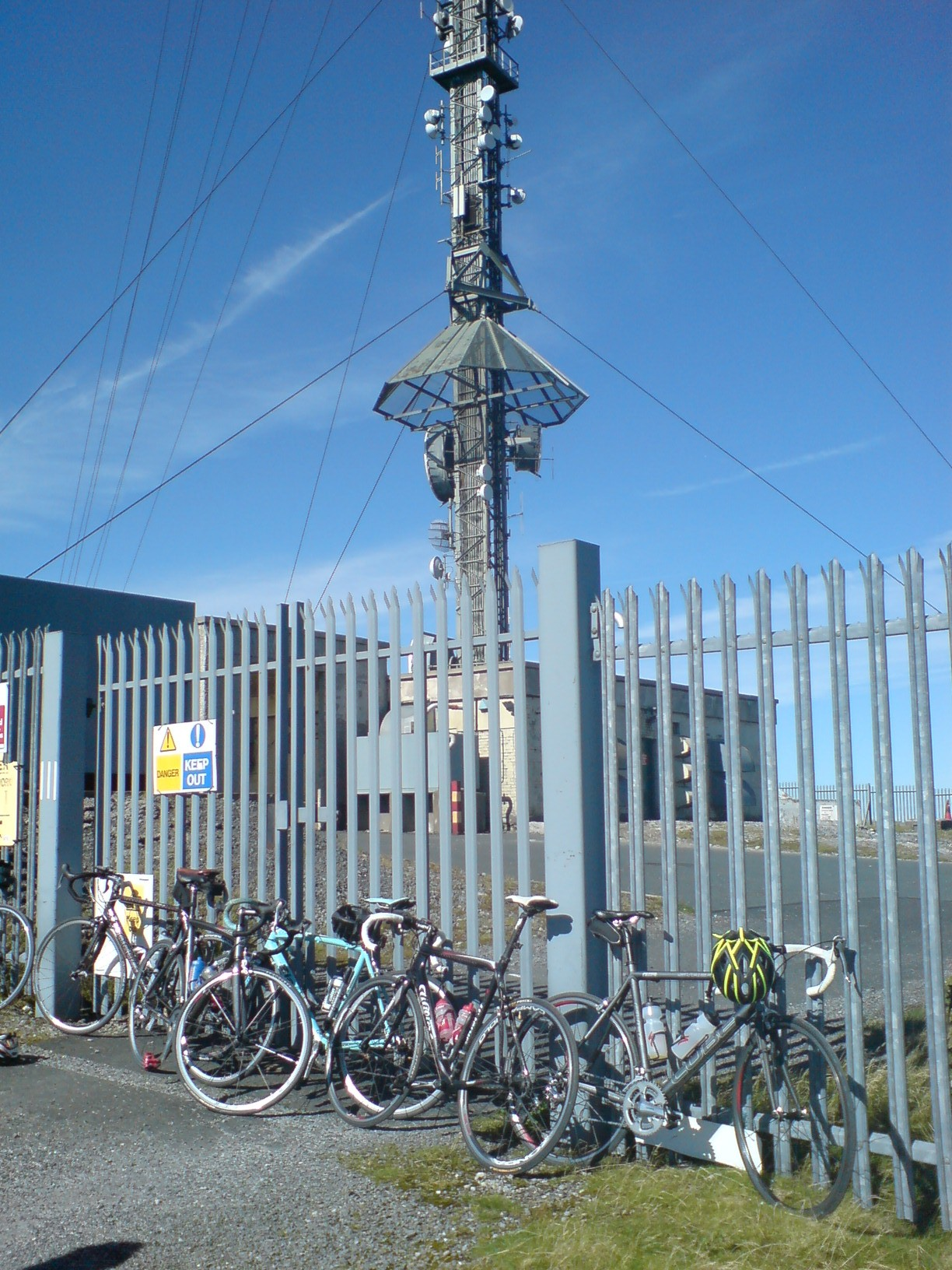
Transmitter mast on the summit

At the summit of Kippure stands a 127m (417') television and radio transmitter mast. This is the oldest television transmission site in Ireland and was initially selected as a potential VHF FM radio transmitter site during the course of a Radio Éireann survey in the mid-1950s. The Irish Board of Works built an access road to the site in 1959, and the transmitter installation work was then started by the British company Pye Ltd. By the summer of 1961 the mast was erected and test transmissions followed, consisting of slide views of Ireland, a test-card, and the music of Count John McCormack.

Telefís Éireann began with transmission from Kippure on 31 December 1961 using the British 405-line TV standard on VHF Band III channel 7, to be followed by a 625-line service on channel H in the summer of 1962. Kippure was the first of the original five main Telefís Éireann transmitters to come into service, the others being, Truskmore (1962), Mount Leinster (1963), Maghera (1963), and Mullaghanish (1963).

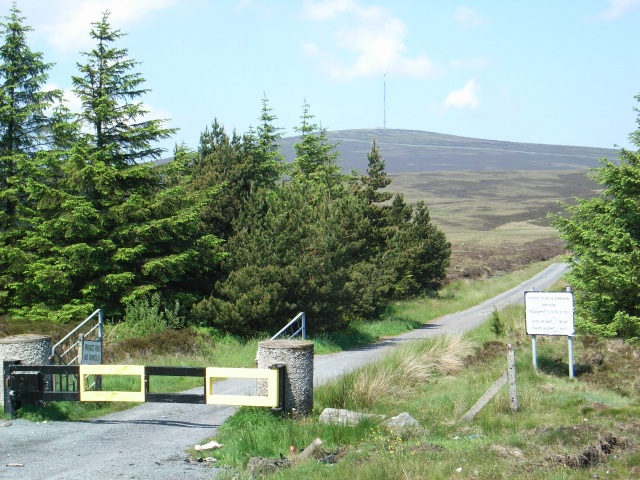
Entrance gate

VHF FM transmission of RTÉ Radio (the former Radio Éireann) commenced in 1966, with stereo broadcasting beginning in 1969.

405-line transmission from Kippure ceased in 1978 with the arrival of RTÉ 2, however, Kippure did not transmit RTÉ 2 until much later. Initially on Channel J at low power later moving to Channel H with RTÉ 1 moving to Channel E.

Kippure's importance in radio and television transmission has diminished since the late 1970s with the opening of three new UHF transmitter sites at Three Rock in County Dún Laoghaire–Rathdown, Clermont Carn in County Louth, and Cairn Hill in County Longford, which provide better reception in most areas previously served only by Kippure. Today the Irish DTT service, Saorview, the national FM radio stations, and some commercial radio stations are broadcast from the site.

== Current transmissions ==
=== Digital television ===
Frequency	UHF	kW	Multiplex	Pol
578 MHz	34	125	Saorview 1	H
586 MHz	35	125	Saorview 2	H

=== FM radio ===
Frequency	kW	Service	Notes
89.1 MHz	50	RTÉ Radio 1	Shared with RnaG before 1985
91.3 MHz	50	RTÉ 2fm	95.3 MHz before 1985
93.5 MHz	50	RTÉ Raidió na Gaeltachta	89.1 MHz before 1985
98.7 MHz	50	RTÉ lyric fm	Since 1999
100.9 MHz	50	Today FM	Since 1997

=== Kippure relay transmitters ===
DTT Relay	County	Mux 1	Mux 2	kW	Pol
Laragh	Wicklow	47	44	0.025	H
Rathnew	Wicklow	22	25	0.5	V

== Bibliography ==
- Fairbairn, Helen (2014). Dublin & Wicklow: A Walking Guide. Collins Press. ISBN 978-1848892019.
- Fairbairn, Helen (2014). Ireland's Best Walks: A Walking Guide. Collins Press. ISBN 978-1848892118.
- MountainViews Online Database (Simon Stewart) (2013). A Guide to Ireland's Mountain Summits: The Vandeleur-Lynams & the Arderins. Collins Books. ISBN 978-1-84889-164-7.
- Dillion, Paddy (1993). The Mountains of Ireland: A Guide to Walking the Summits. Cicerone. ISBN 978-1852841102.

== Gallery ==
Lough Bray Lower and Upper

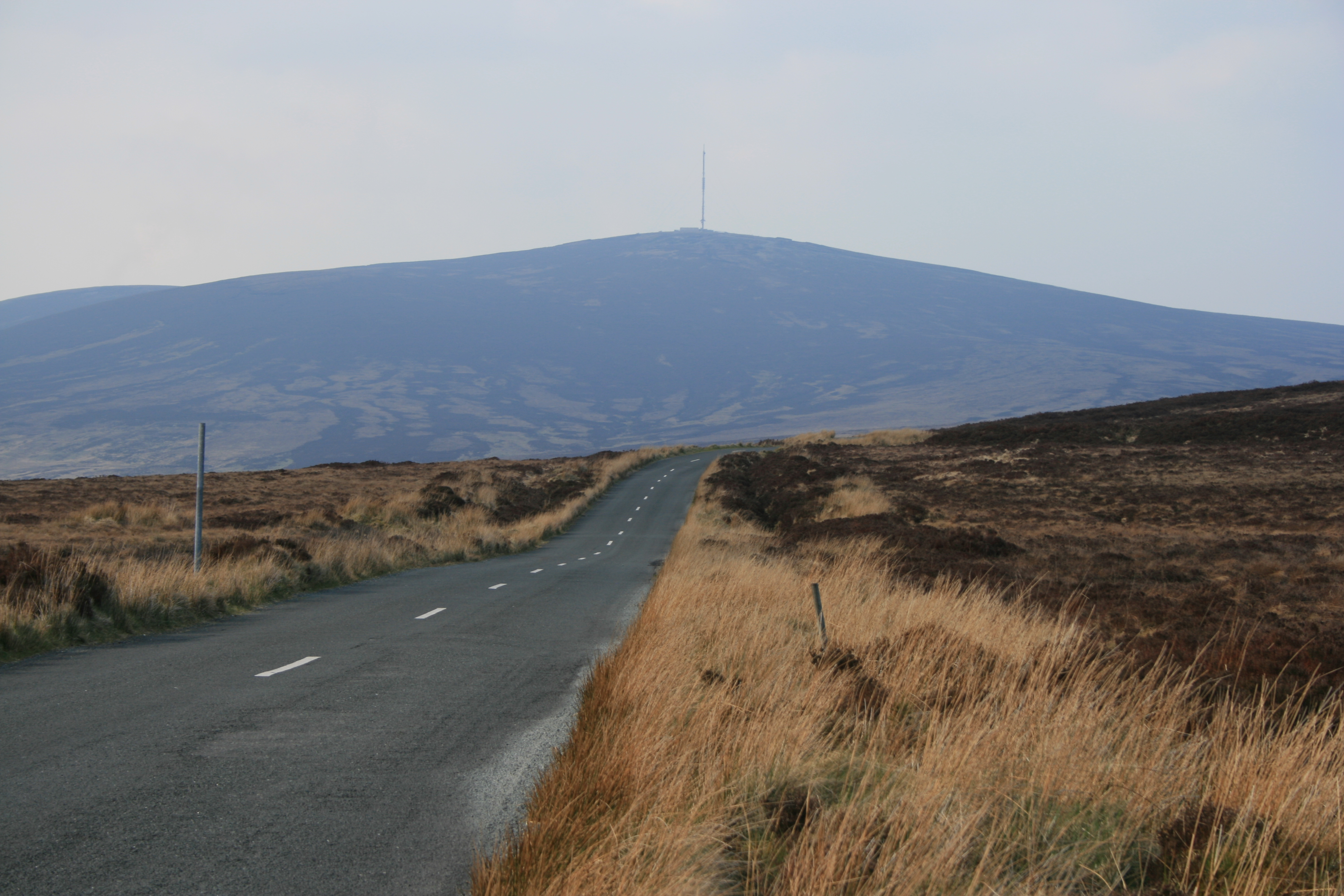
From the Sally Gap

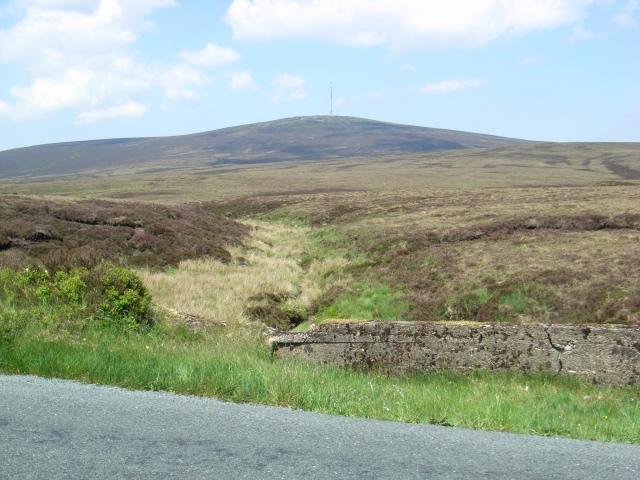
River Liffey tributary

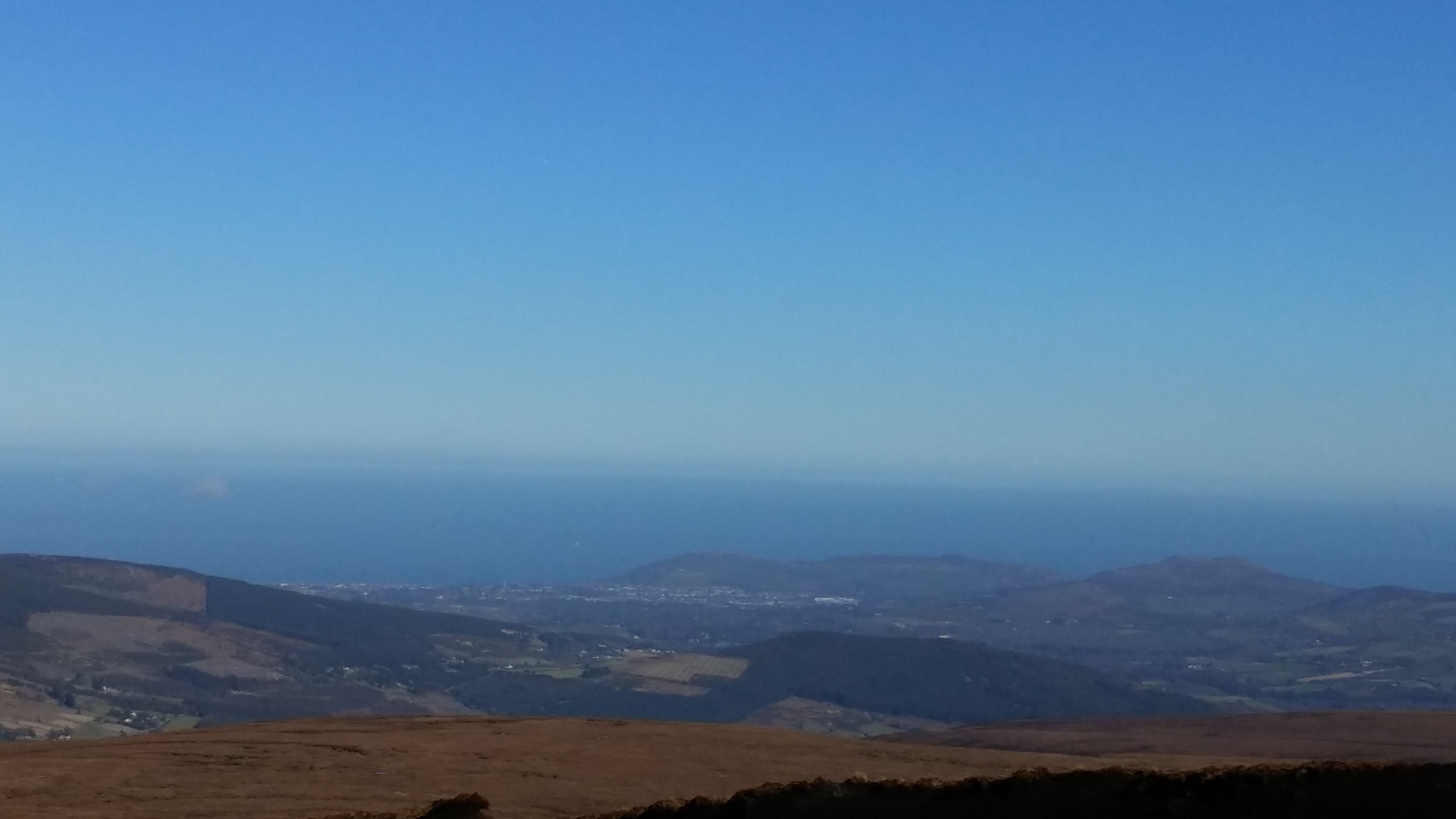
View east from the summit

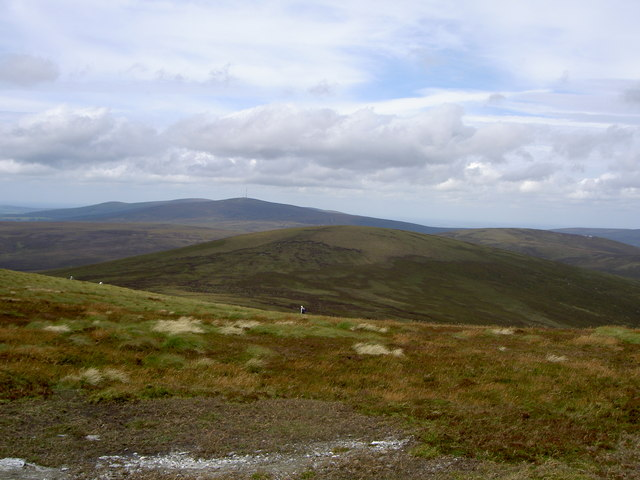
Killpure and War Hill from Djouce

== See also ==
- Wicklow Way
- Wicklow Round
- Wicklow Mountains
- Lists of mountains in Ireland
- List of mountains of the British Isles by height
- List of tallest structures in Ireland
- List of Marilyns in the British Isles
- List of Hewitt mountains in England, Wales and Ireland
