= Crone Woods =

Forest in Wicklow, Ireland

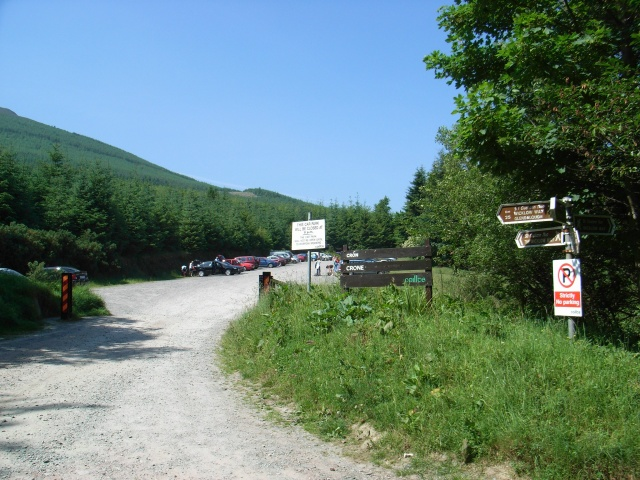
- Entrance car park

- Location within island of Ireland
- Interactive map of Crone Woods

Geography
- Location: County Wicklow, Leinster, Ireland
- OS grid: O1920 1417
- Coordinates: 53.16096225°N 6.226272243361938°W
- Elevation: 185 m (607 ft)

Administration
- Authority: Coillte

Crone Woods, also Crone Forest, is located in the northeastern section of the Wicklow Mountains, just below the summit of Maulin 570 metres (1,870 ft), in County Wicklow, Ireland. Crone Woods have an extensive network of forest trails and hikes which can be accessed from the village of Enniskerry.

== Description ==
The woods were once part of the Powerscourt Estate with records from the 13th-century showing the area was set aside as a royal hunting ground. Use of the woods for cover during the 1798 Rebellion led to the creation of the military road through northern Wicklow Mountains with several barracks to open up the region. The forest is owned and operated by Coillte, the Irish state forestry agency.

Trails in the wood include several to 'Ride Rock', from which there are views down into Powerscourt Waterfall. Other trails lead to the summit of Maulin.

Crone Woods is an access point to the Wicklow Way, the oldest long-distance trail in the Republic of Ireland, which extends for 131 kilometres (81 mi) from its starting point in Marlay Park in South Dublin to Clonegal Village in County Carlow. The wood is also used by hill-walkers completing the 16-kilometre loop of Maulin, Tonduff 642 metres (2,106 ft), War Hill 686 metres (2,251 ft) and Djouce 725 metres (2,379 ft), which is sometimes called the 'Circuit of Glensoulan'.

== Gallery ==
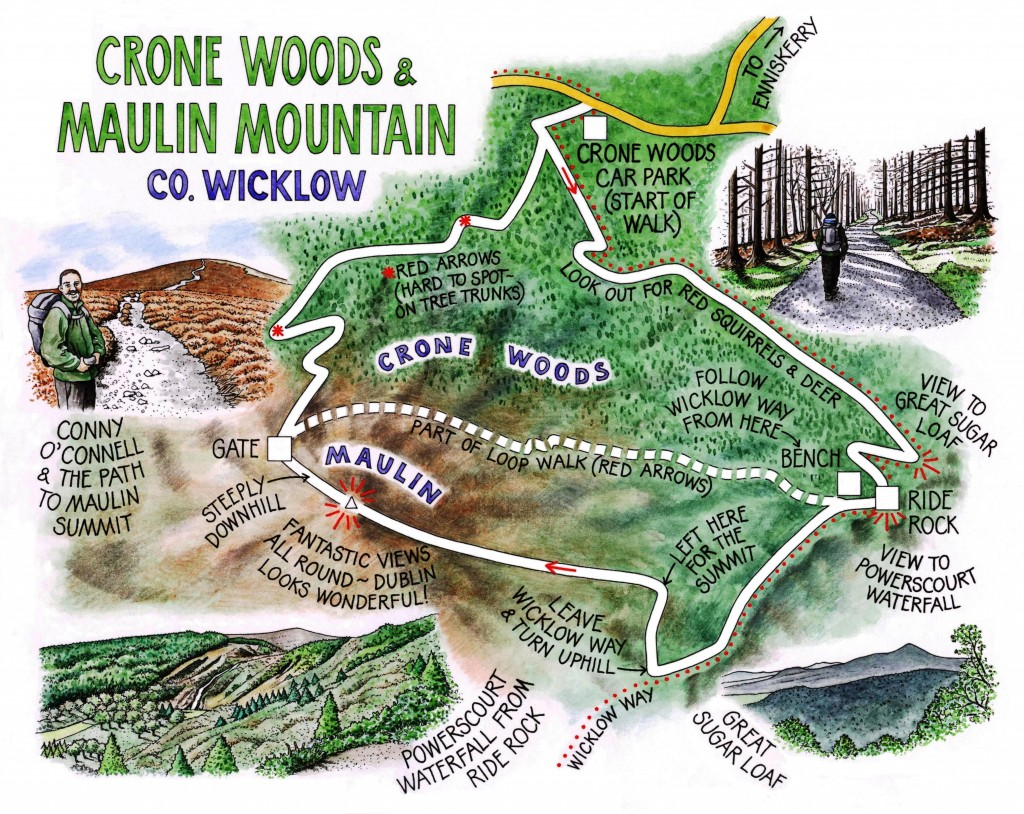
Crone Wood trails

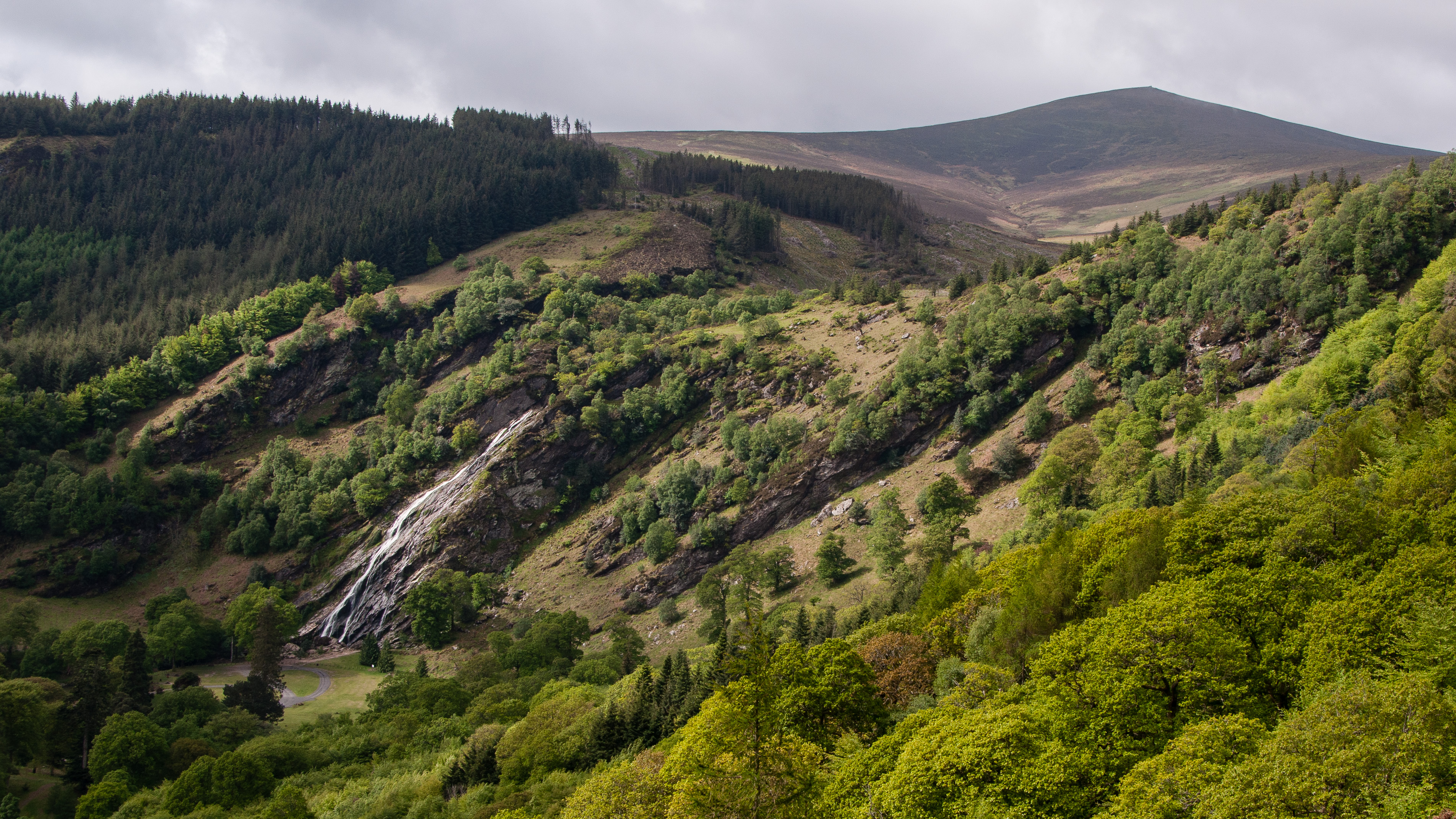
Powerscourt Waterfall and Crone Woods

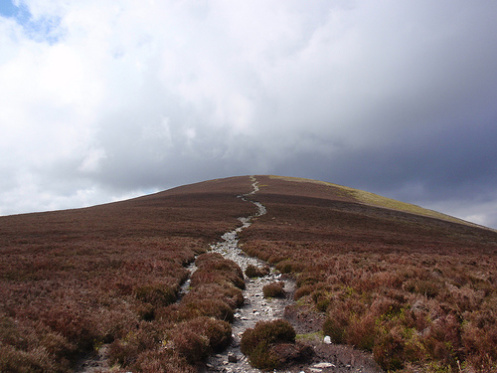
Final path to Maulin from Crone Woods

== See also ==
- List of forests in Ireland
- Lists of long-distance trails in the Republic of Ireland
