= Powerscourt Waterfall =

Ireland's highest waterfall, Wicklow

- Eas Chonaill
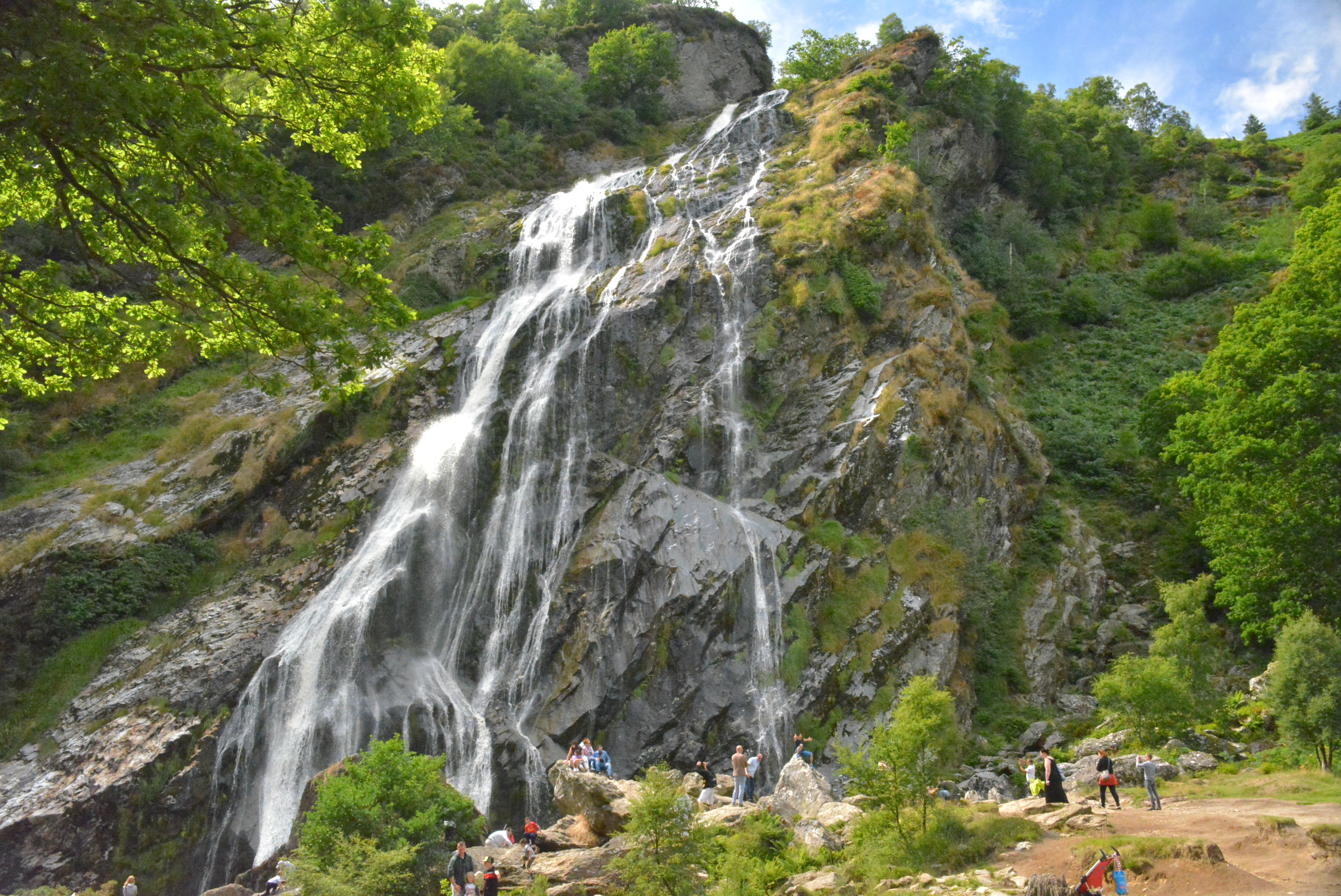
- The waterfall in August 2013
- Interactive map of Powerscourt Waterfall
- Location: Powerscourt Estate, Ireland
- Coordinates: 53.146°N 06.211°W
- Type: Horsetail-fan
- Total height: 121 metres (397 ft)
- Number of drops: Cascade waterfall
- Watercourse: River Dargle
- World height ranking: 687

Powerscourt Waterfall (Irish: Eas Chonaill) is the second highest waterfall in Ireland at 121 metres (397 ft) high, it is located at the base of Glensoulan on the River Dargle near Enniskerry, County Wicklow.

Powerscourt is overlooked by the peaks of Djouce (725 metres (2,379 ft)) and Maulin (570 metres (1,870 ft)), and flows continuously all year in a horsetail-fan pattern. The waterfall is part of the Powerscourt Estate, with tickets for the public available 363 days a year.

== Geography ==
Powerscourt Waterfall, known in Irish as Eas Chonaill, lies at the base of the Glensoulan valley, a hanging valley, through which the River Dargle flows from its source on the southern slopes of Tonduff mountain, eventually falling into the steep corrie in which the waterfall lies.

Several mountains surround the upper section of the Glensoulan valley in a "horseshoe-shape", being: Maulin 570 metres (1,870 ft), Tonduff 642 metres (2,106 ft), War Hill 686 metres (2,251 ft), and Djouce 725 metres (2,379 ft). The waterfall is bounded by Crone Woods on its northern section.

== Geology ==
Geological Survey of Ireland (GSI) regard the waterfalls an "important site for both the glacial feature and for the geological influence of the rocks themselves on the formation of the waterfall"; and describe the Powerscourt corrie, in which the waterfall sits, as "a fine example of glacial erosion, where accumulated ice has scoured out a deep basin, with a waterfall flowing down the steep backwall".

The Powerscourt waterfall flows over Irish Ribband Group schists, which sit in a metamorphic aureole of Leinster granite. The cleavage (or schistosity) dips steeply outwards, paralleling the sides of the granite pluton, which forms the surface over which the water cascades; however, the GSI note the contact between schist and granite is some distance upstream of the waterfall.

Both boulders of schist (a silvery-sheen appearance), and of granite (a speckled crystalline appearance), can be seen in the pools at the base of the waterfall.

== Access ==
The waterfall is part of the Powerscourt Estate, who grant paid-access to the public through a separate visitor entrance (6 miles from the main estate entrance) during set times. At the base of the waterfall are visitor facilities, car parking, picnic and barbecue area, and various concessions. As of 2026, an adult ticket to access the waterfall costs €8.

The waterfall can also be viewed from Ride Rock in Crone Woods, which also offers trails to the summit of Maulin. A 7-kilometre 3-hour hill-walking route known as the Maulin Circuit, takes in Crone Woods, Maulin and the Powerscourt waterfall.

== Notable events ==
In August 1821, during the visit of King George IV to Ireland, Richard Wingfield, 5th Viscount Powerscourt dammed the waterfall so he could release a torrent while the two stood on the bridge below the falls. For reasons unknown, the king did not leave the banquet at Powerscourt House to view the waterfall, which was fortunate as, when the water was finally released, the bridge was washed away.

A number of fatal accidents have taken place at Powerscourt Waterfall.

== Filming location ==
The following films and television shows have been filmed in part at the waterfall:

- Excalibur (1981)
- Willow (1988)
- Vikings (2013–2020)
- Cocaine Bear (2023)

== Gallery ==
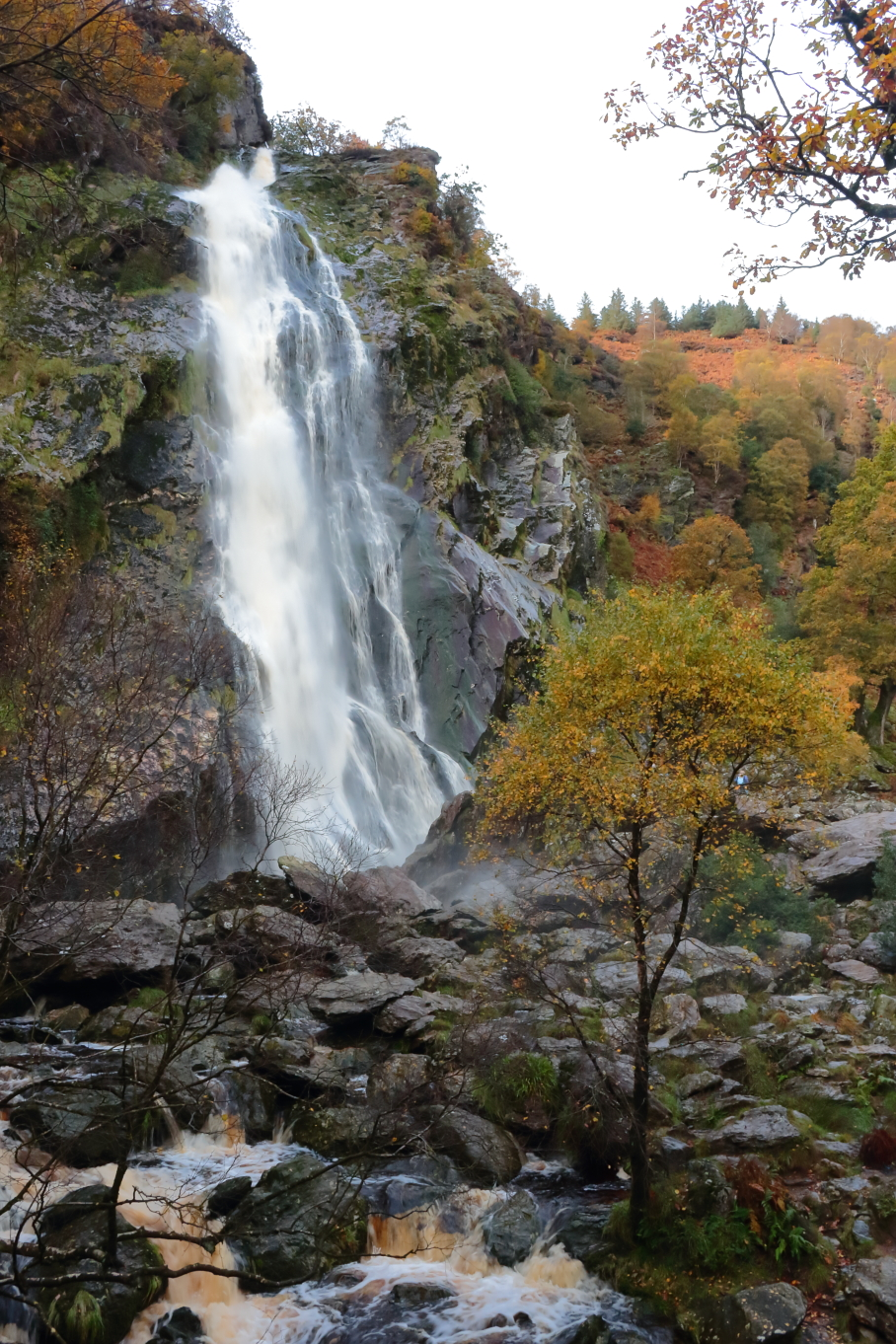
Waterfall in autumn

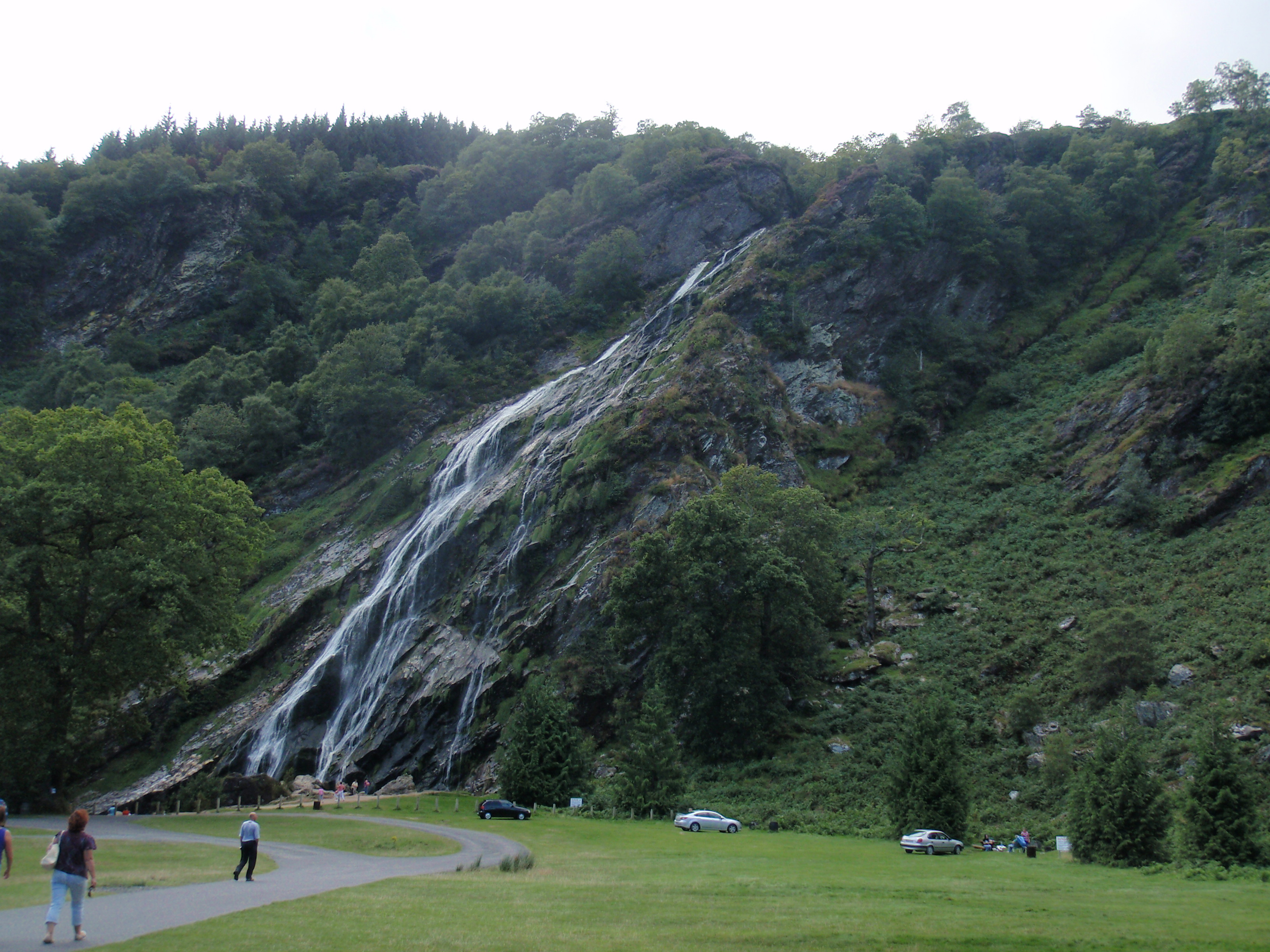
Waterfall and visitor picnic area

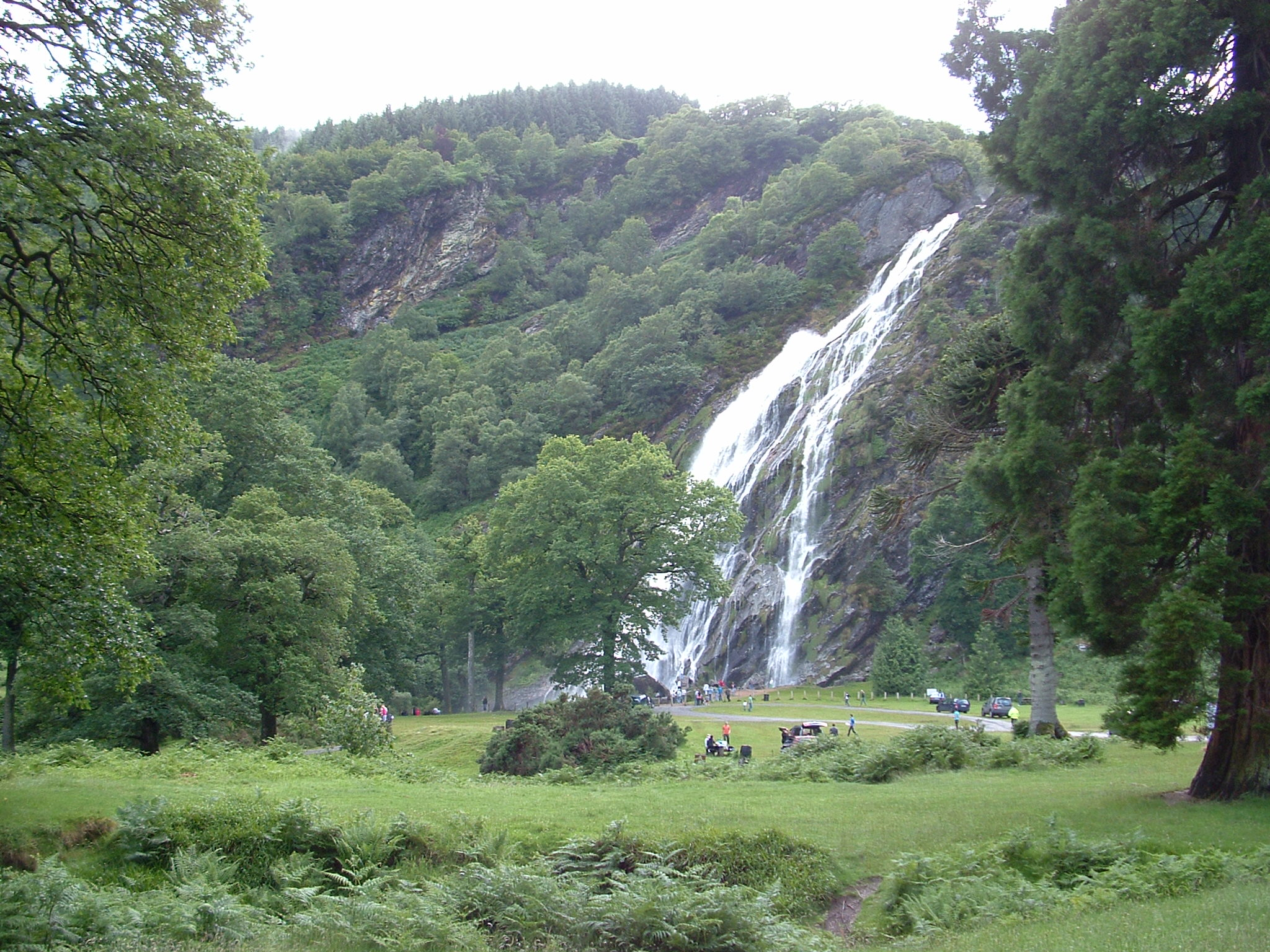
The waterfall in July 2008

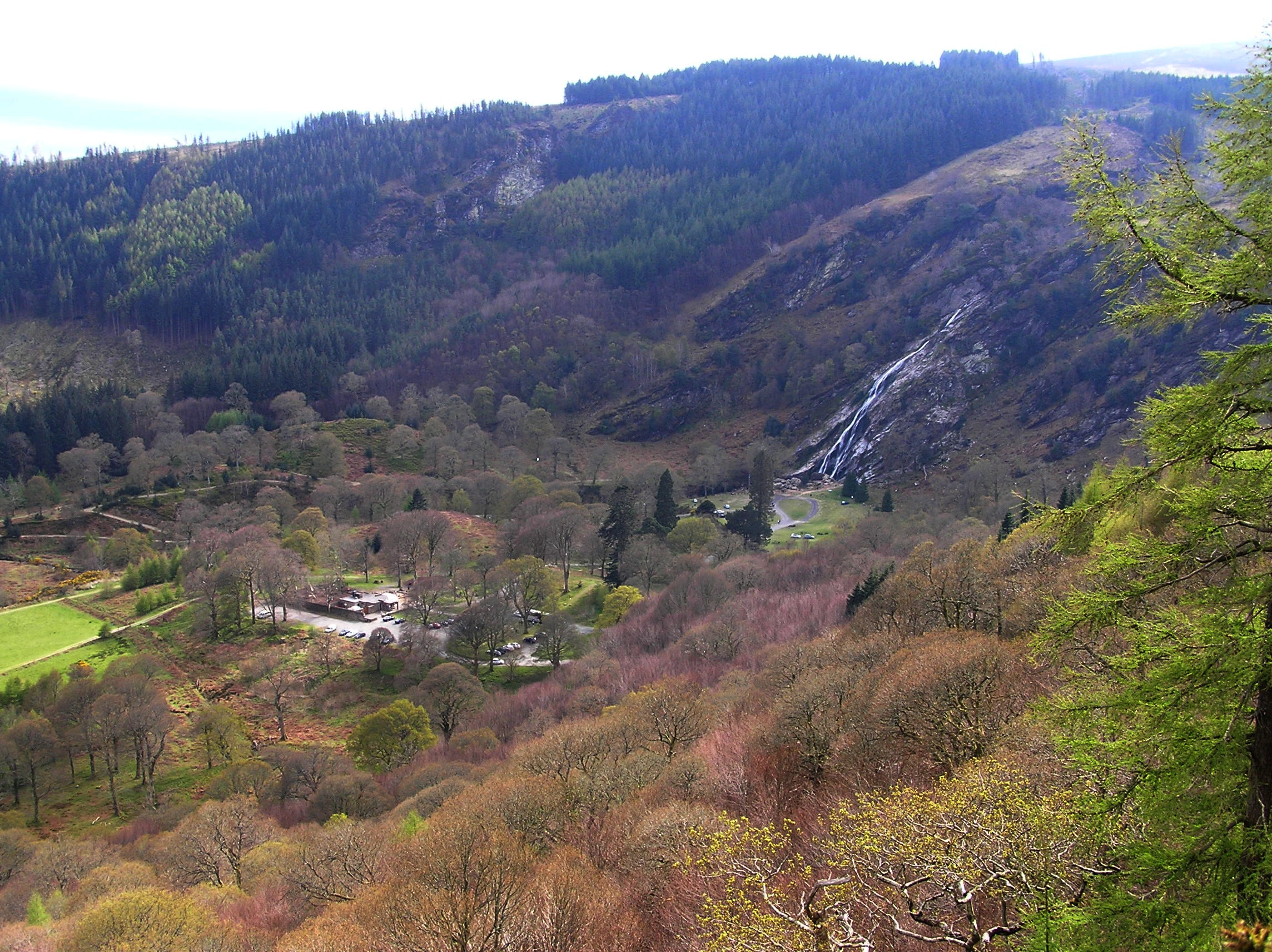
From Crone Woods on slopes of Maulin

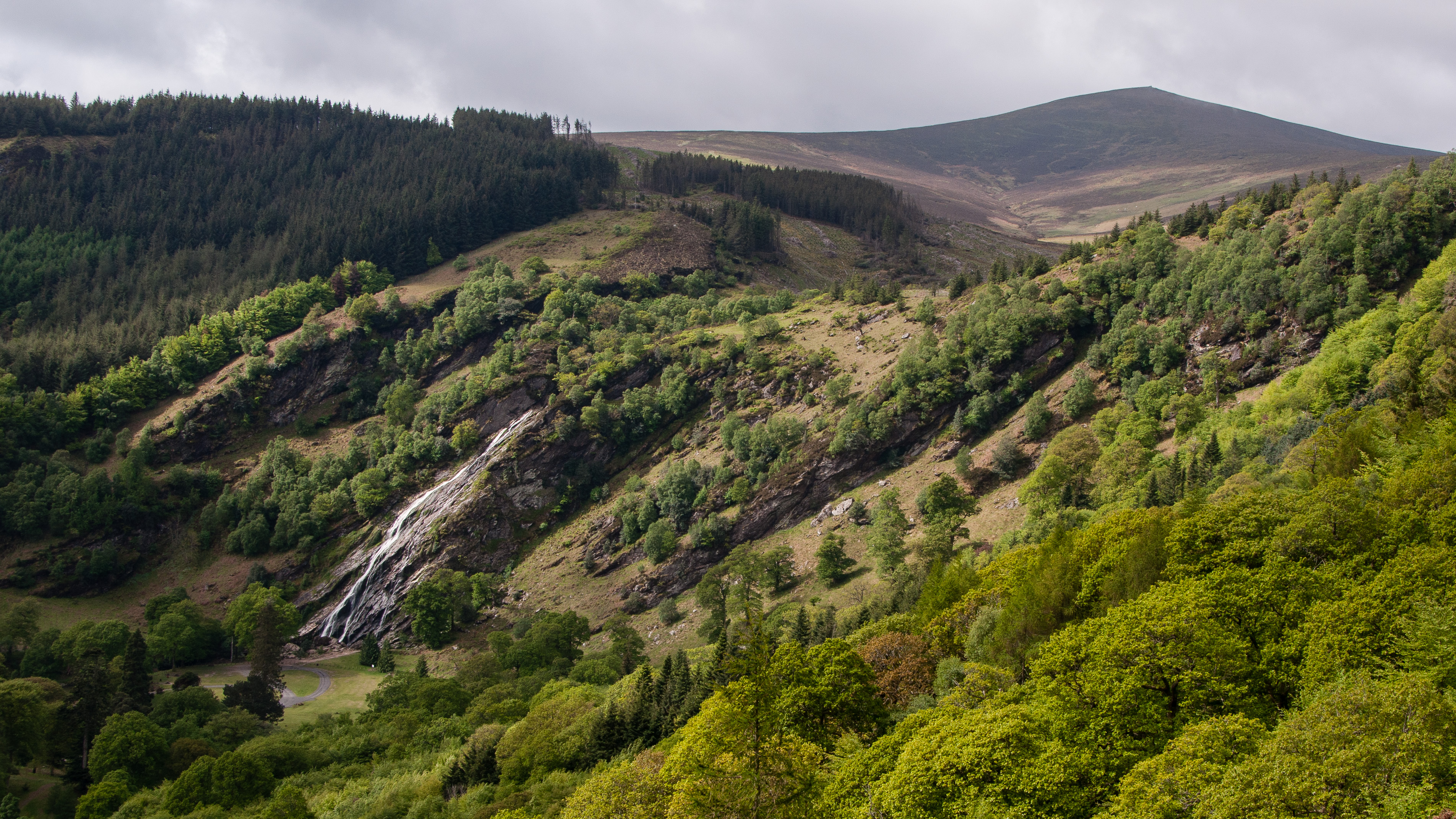
Glensoulan Valley and Djouce behind

== See also ==
- List of waterfalls
- Powerscourt Estate
- Glenmacnass Waterfall
- Torc Waterfall
- Sruth in Aghaidh an Aird, Ireland's highest waterfall
