= War Hill =

Mountain in County Wicklow, Ireland

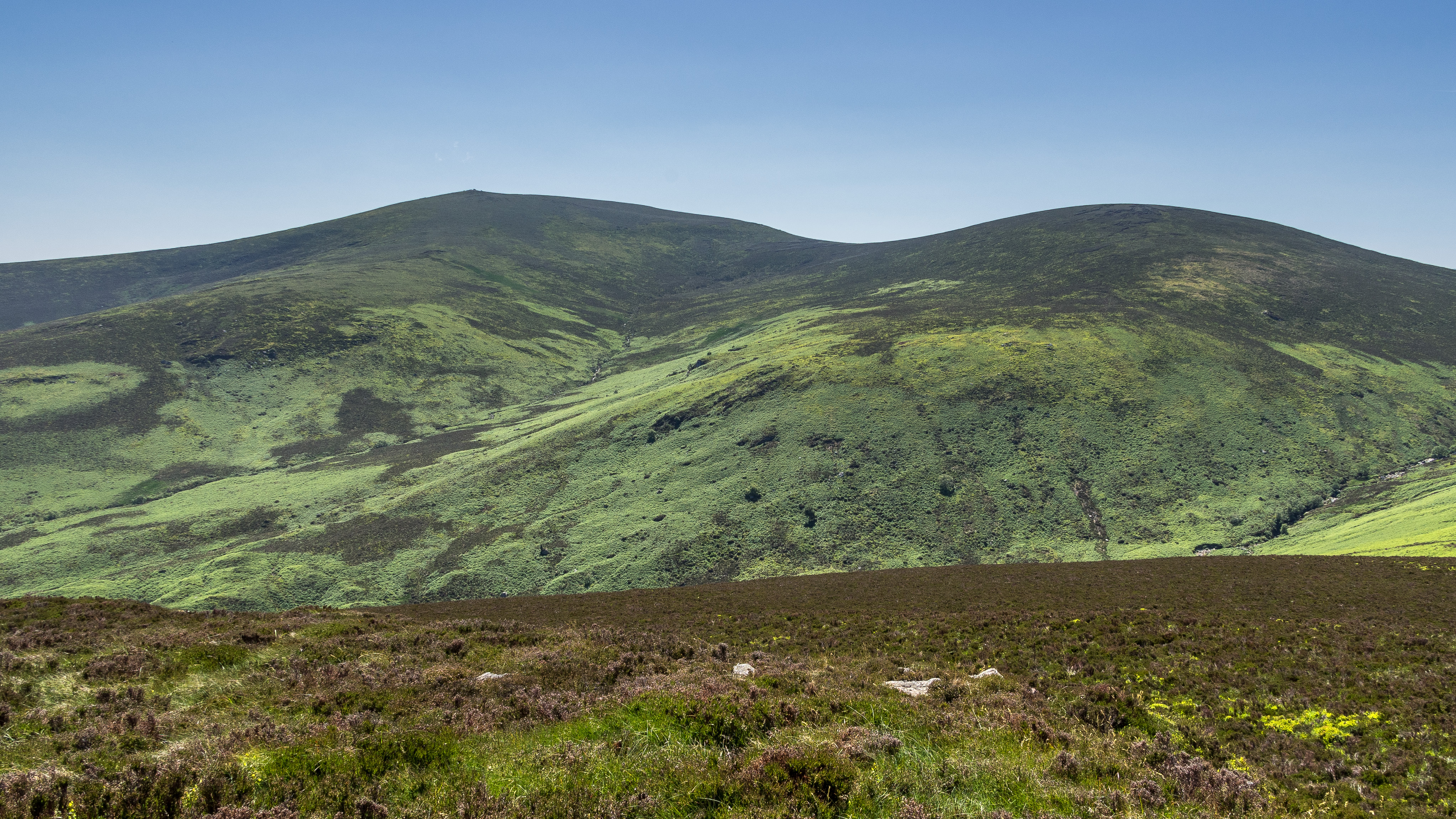
- War Hill (r) and Djouce (l), as seen looking southwards from the summit of Maulin

Highest point
- Elevation: 686 m (2,251 ft)
- Prominence: 71 m (233 ft)
- Listing: Hewitt, Arderin, Simm, Vandeleur-Lynam
- Coordinates: 53°08′N 6°15′W

Naming
- Native name: Cnoc an Bhairr
- English translation: Hill of the summit

Geography
- Location within island of Ireland
- Location: County Wicklow, Ireland
- Parent range: Wicklow Mountains
- OSI/OSNI grid: O1689511338
- Topo map: OSi Discovery 56

Geology
- Mountain type: Granite with microcline phenocrysts Bedrock

Climbing
- Easiest route: via Djouce Mountain

War Hill (Irish: Cnoc an Bhairr, meaning 'Hill of the summit') at 686 metres (2,251 ft), is the 106th–highest peak in Ireland on the Arderin scale, and the 129th–highest peak on the Vandeleur-Lynam scale. War Hill is in the far northeastern section of the Wicklow Mountains, in County Wicklow, Ireland. Due to its remote setting, it is usually only accessed as part of a larger hill-walking route taking in other neighbouring peaks such as Djouce or Maulin. One of the few distinguishing landmarks in the area is the Coffin Stone that lies in the saddle between War Hill and Djouce, whose origin is uncertain.

== Naming ==
According to Irish academic Paul Tempan, the proposed Irish name for War Hill, whilst possible, is not backed up by any Irish attestations. In particular, Bhairr (or Barr) is the Irish term for "top" and usually features as the first word in many Irish language names of mountains – E.g. Baurtregaum (from Irish: Barr Trí gCom; meaning "top of the three hollows"). However Wall Hill is not a "top", but is overshadowed by its taller neighbour, Djouce 725 metres (2,379 ft).

Tempan tentatively suggests that a possible alternative is that there never was an Irish language name and that the source name is the English name, War Hill. Tempan quotes a letter from 1838 by Irish antiquarian Eugene O'Curry, recording that: "In the Townland of Lackandarragh, in the Powerscourt Parish they shew a place called the Churchyard, but it does not retain the least vestige of either a church or churchyard. Some say that it was the place of sepulture of persons killed in a battle fought between the English troops and the O’Tooles some three hundred years ago. This battle was fought on War Hill, immediately overhanging this Churchyard, on the opposite side of the river".

== Geography ==
War Hill sits on the northern shoulder of its taller neighbour Djouce. Wall Hill looks down into the Glensoulan Valley, through which the River Dargle flows eastwards into Powerscourt Waterfall, the highest waterfall in Ireland; northwards across the valley of the River Dargle lies Tonduff and Maulin.

Irish hill-walking author, J.B. Malone once described War Hill as lying in a "bog desert".

== Hill walking ==
Because of its remote setting, War Hill is usually only climbed as part of a "loop route" taking in other neighboring mountains.

A popular route is a 15-kilometre circuit that starts at the Ballinastoe Wood car-park to climb the boarded mountain path to White Hill and then to the base of the summit of Djouce 725 metres (2,379 ft). However, instead of summiting Djouce, the boardwalk path is followed eastwards to the cliffs above the Powerscourt Waterfalls. Finally, the loop is closed by walking back up to War Hill via the southern side of the Glensoulan Valley and then onto the summit of Djouce itself. The route then follows back to Ballinastoe Wood via the boardwalk and White Hill.

Another popular variation of this "loop route" is to start in the Crone Woods car-park, and complete a 16-kilometre loop of Maulin 570 metres (1,870 ft), Tonduff 642 metres (2,106 ft), War Hill, and Djouce, and then returning to Crone Woods car-park; this circuit is sometimes called the Circuit of Glensoulan.

== Coffin stone ==
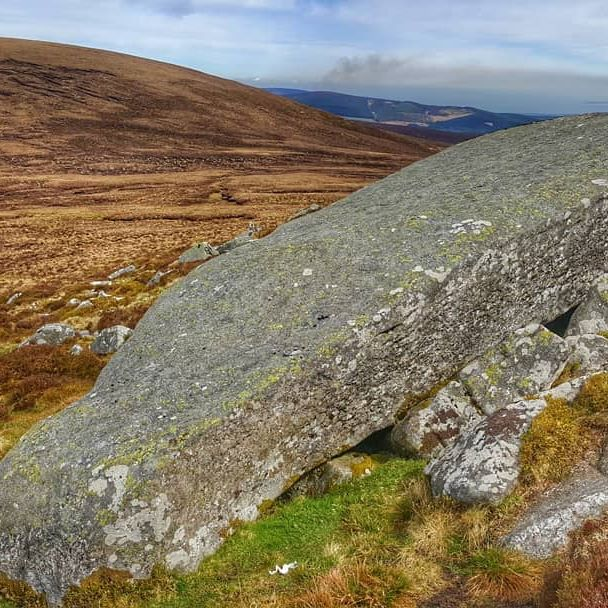
Coffin Stone with War Hill behind

In the saddle between War Hill and Djouce lies a cluster of boulders known as the Coffin Stone at O178104. Records from Irish Mountaineering Club note that according to J.B. Malone, these stones were the only natural rock-feature recorded on the old "O.S. Sheet 16, half-inch-to-the-mile map" of Dublin and Wicklow mountains. The large 5-metre collapsed boulder is speculated as being an ancient Irish megalithic portal tomb, or possibly, a glacial erratic.

== Bibliography ==
- Fairbairn, Helen (2014). Dublin & Wicklow: A Walking Guide. Collins Press. ISBN 978-1848892019.
- Fairbairn, Helen (2014). Ireland's Best Walks: A Walking Guide. Collins Press. ISBN 978-1848892118.
- MountainViews Online Database (Simon Stewart) (2013). A Guide to Ireland's Mountain Summits: The Vandeleur-Lynams & the Arderins. Collins Books. ISBN 978-1-84889-164-7.
- Dillion, Paddy (1993). The Mountains of Ireland: A Guide to Walking the Summits. Cicerone. ISBN 978-1852841102.

== See also ==
- Wicklow Way
- Wicklow Mountains
- Lists of mountains in Ireland
- List of mountains of the British Isles by height
- List of Hewitt mountains in England, Wales and Ireland
