= Glenasmole =

Mountain valley near Dublin, Ireland

Glenasmole Gleann an Smóil
- Valley
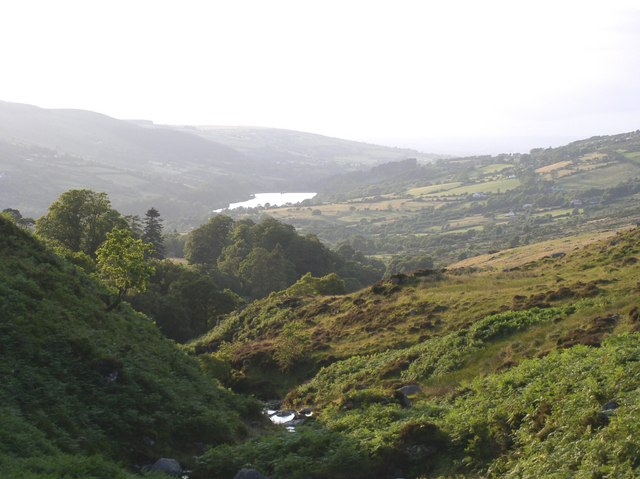
- The valley looking north along the River Dodder, the Bohernabreena Reservoir can be seen in the distance
- Interactive map of Glenasmole
- Coordinates: 53.23301°N 6.35627°W
- Location: County Dublin, Ireland
- Range: Dublin Mountains
- Part of: Wicklow Mountains
- Highest elevation: 757 m (2,484 ft) (Kippure)

Glenasmole (Irish: Gleann an Smóil) is a valley in the Dublin Mountains in the south of County Dublin, Ireland.

The valley itself is around 200 m (660 ft) in elevation and is surrounded by mountains exceeding 600 m (2,000 ft) in elevation. Kippure, at 757 m (2,484 ft), is the highest mountain along the valley ridge and is also the highest point in County Dublin. The River Dodder rises at Kippure and flows through the valley, reaching the sea at Dublin Bay. The Glenasmole Valley is an EU-designated Special Area of Conservation.

The Dodder feeds the two reservoirs at the centre of the valley, known as the Bohernabreena Reservoirs (Irish: Taiscumar Bóthar na Bruíne). The reservoirs, constructed between 1883 and 1887, supply 18.2 million litres of water per day. Despite being within South Dublin's local authority area, the reservoirs and accompanying waterworks are owned and operated by Dublin City Council.

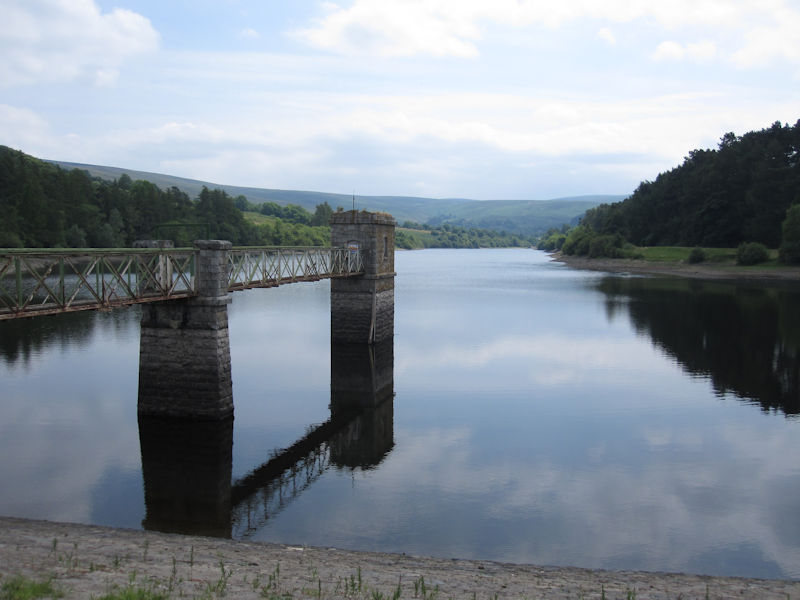
Bohernabreena Reservoir, 2018

The area around the valley is rural in nature and has a population of 415 according to the 2016 Census. There are no nucleated villages in the valley as most dwellings are one-off houses. The small area encompassing the valley covers 30 square kilometres (7,413 acres), giving it a population density of 14.9 people per square km, making it the most sparsely populated region in County Dublin.

== Archaeology ==
Rosaleen Dwyer, Heritage Officer of South Dublin County Council, explained in a 2015 talk the significance of an archaeological site at Piperstown on the east slopes of the valley:

Another one of the upland sites is Piperstown (..) Really when you look at it, it's not the sort of thing that jumps out at you as being visible archaeology, y'know, if you walked over that ground without really paying much attention, you wouldn't be aware that you were walking over a very, very important archaeological site. It's a very significant archaeological complex dating to the late Neolithic and features include seven huts and eight burial cairns, but as I say, you need interpretation to understand what you're looking at.

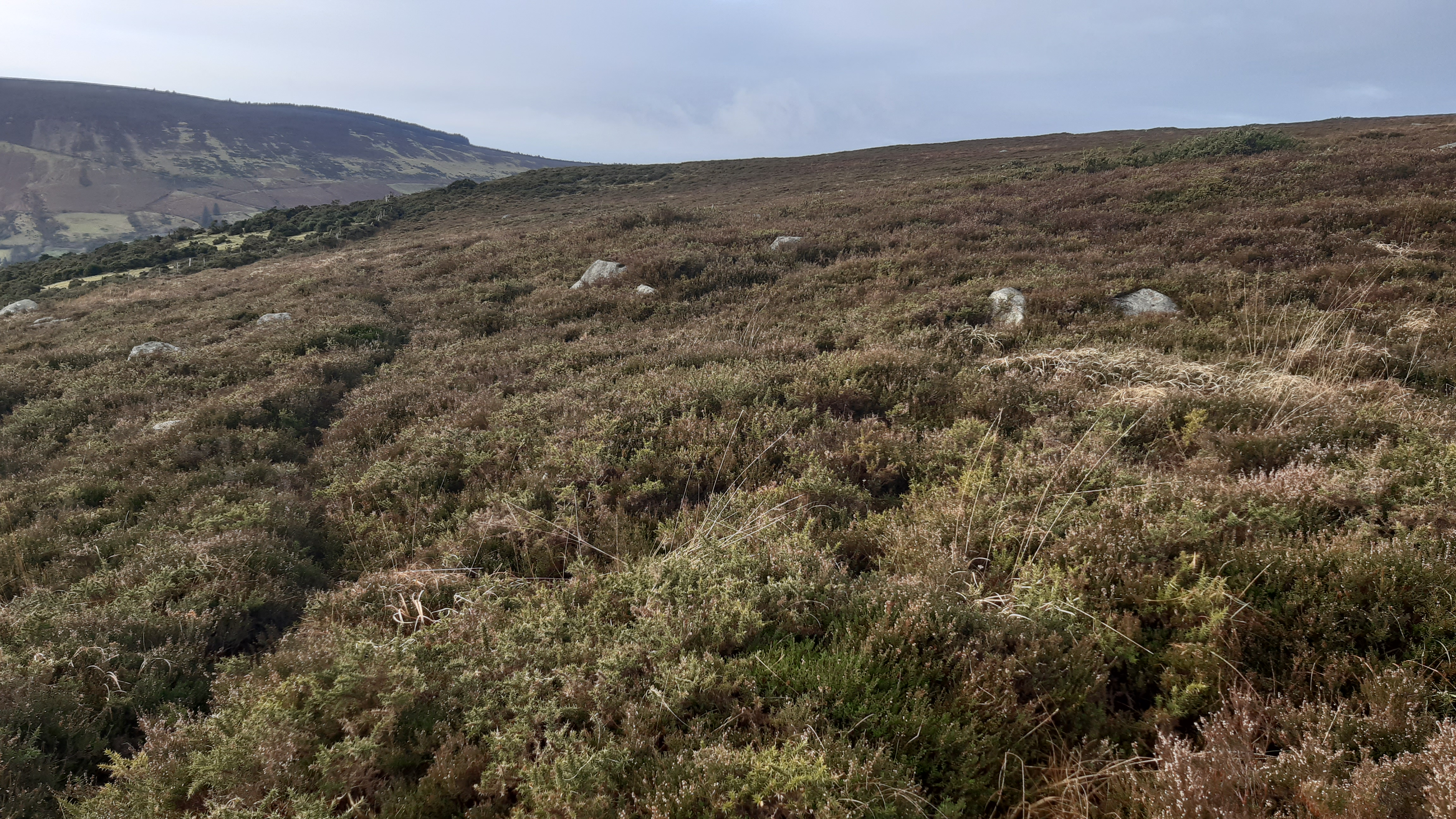
Rocks amongst the heather at Piperstown in 2026

The academic Michael Fewer wrote in 2007 of Piperstown Hill (a low eminence), on the southern slopes of which "no less than fifteen prehistoric sites were exposed some years ago when a severe heather fire stripped all herbage off the hill." Eight of the sites were identified as burial cairns, and the remaining seven as habitation sites - the majority of which dating from the Neolithic or about 5,000 years ago. Most of the remains of timber found at the sites were oak, which would have filled the valleys in the area at the time, along with pine and birch.

According to academic Peter Quinn, the sites at Piperstown differ from all other sites in the area in that it comprises both habitation sites and burial places of people who probably belonged to one community and one period. Because of this, it is "almost unique" amongst Irish prehistoric sites.

== Sources ==
- Fewer, Michael (2007). The Wicklow Military Road: History and Topography. Dublin: Ashfield Press. ISBN 978-1-901658-66-8.
- Quinn, Peter (2015). Bohernabreena. Dublin: The History Press Ireland. ISBN 978-1-84588-887-9.
