= Maulin =

Mountain in County Wicklow, Ireland

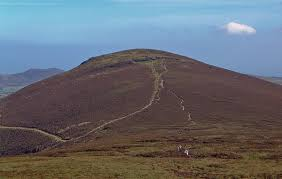
- Maulin summit viewed from Tonduff

Highest point
- Elevation: 570 m (1,870 ft)
- Prominence: 70 m (230 ft)
- Listing: Arderin
- Coordinates: 53°09′22″N 6°13′50″W

Naming
- Native name: Málainn (Irish)
- English translation: 'High/sloping ground'
- Pronunciation: Irish: [ˈmˠaːlˠən̠ʲ]

Geography
- Location within island of Ireland
- Location: County Wicklow, Ireland
- Parent range: Wicklow Mountains
- OSI/OSNI grid: O184131
- Topo map: OSi Discovery 56

Geology
- Mountain type(s): Dark blue-grey slate, phyllite & schist

Climbing
- Easiest route: from Crone Woods

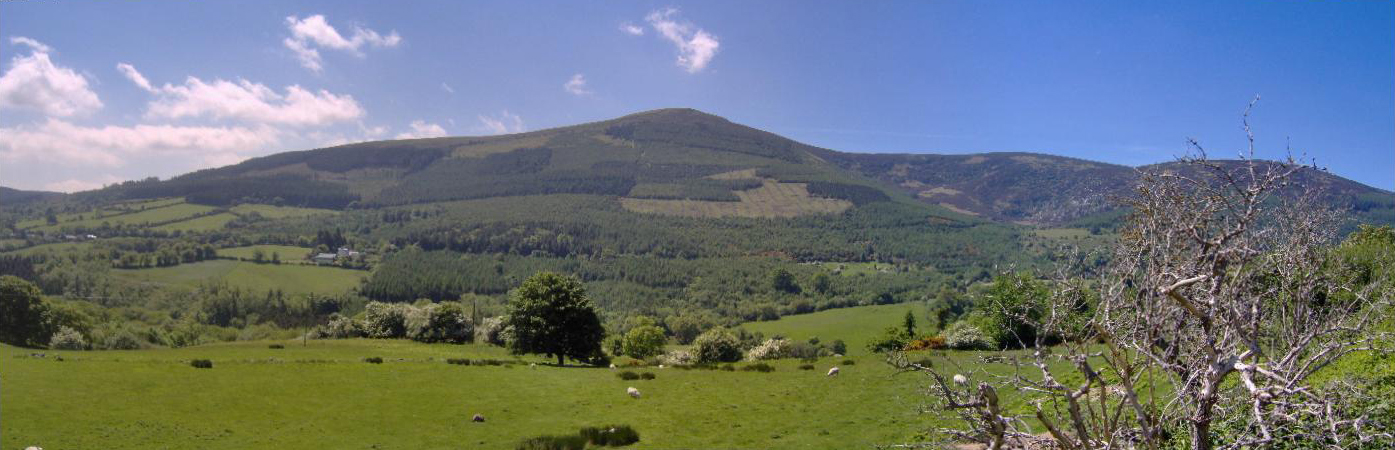
Maulin from the north

Maulin (Irish: Málainn, meaning 'High/sloping ground'), at 570 metres (1,870 ft), is the 272nd–highest peak in Ireland on the Arderin scale, however, being below 600 m it does not rank on the Vandeleur-Lynam or Hewitt scales. Maulin is in the far northeastern section of the Wicklow Mountains, at the mouth of Glensoulan Valley; Powerscourt Waterfall lies at its base.

Maulin is accessed from the trails through Crone Woods, a Sitka spruce plantation on its northern slopes; Maulin is also accessible just off the main Wicklow Way. Maulin is often climbed as part of a "loop route" called the Circuit of Glensoulan which starts at Crone Woods car-park, and complete a 16-kilometre loop of Maulin, Tonduff 642 metres (2,106 ft), War Hill 686 metres (2,251 ft), and Djouce 725 metres (2,379 ft), and then returning to Crone Woods car-park.

The Knockree An Óige youth hostel is located at the base of Maulin in Lackandarragh near the village of Enniskerry.

== Bibliography ==
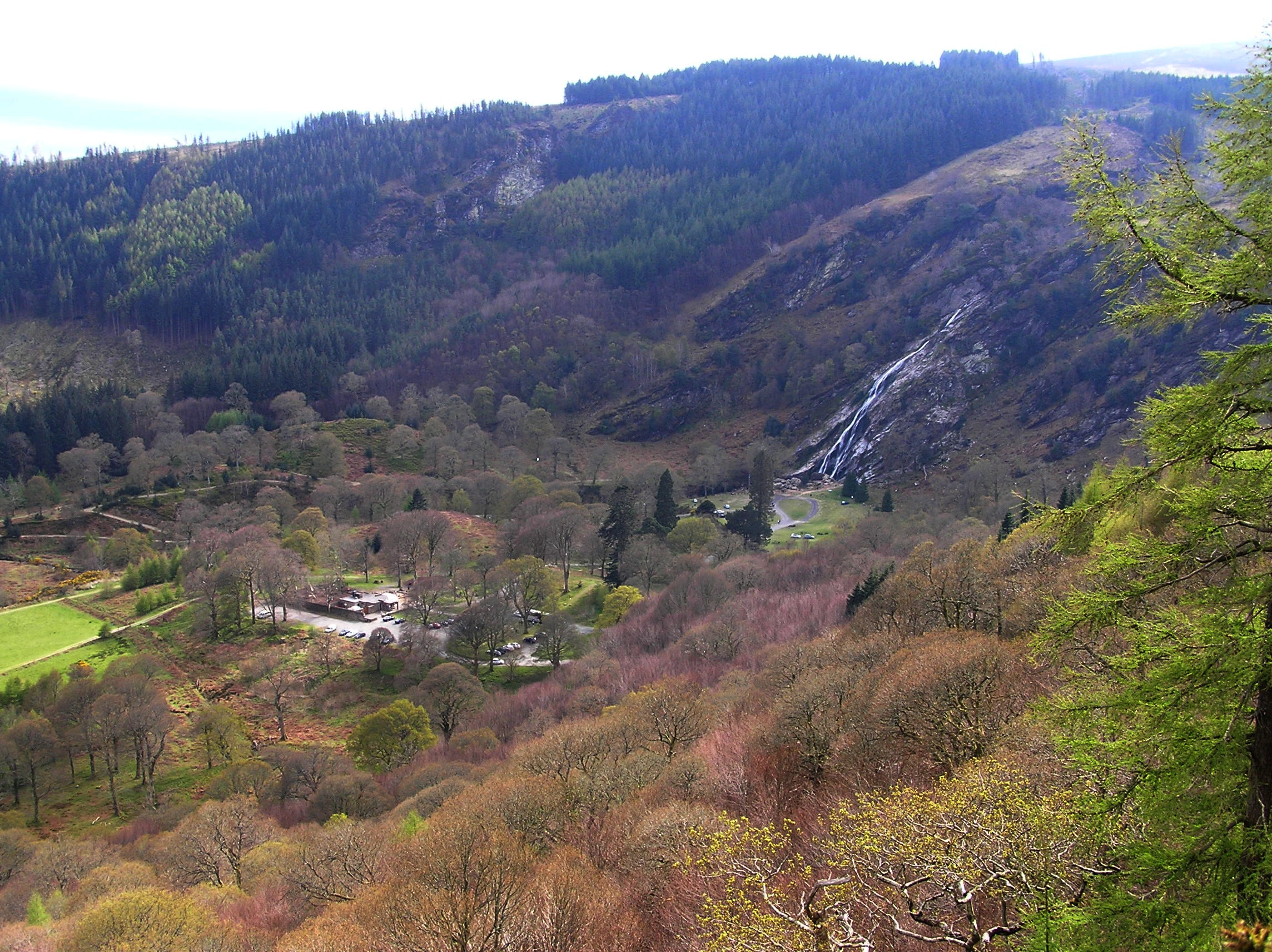
Powerscourt Waterfall seen from slopes of Maulin

- Fairbairn, Helen (2014). Dublin & Wicklow: A Walking Guide. Collins Press. ISBN 978-1848892019.
- MountainViews Online Database (Simon Stewart) (2013). A Guide to Ireland's Mountain Summits: The Vandeleur-Lynams & the Arderins. Collins Books. ISBN 978-1-84889-164-7.
- Dillion, Paddy (1993). The Mountains of Ireland: A Guide to Walking the Summits. Cicerone. ISBN 978-1852841102.

== See also ==
- Wicklow Way
- Wicklow Mountains
- Lists of mountains in Ireland
- List of mountains of the British Isles by height
- List of Hewitt mountains in England, Wales and Ireland
