= Djouce =

Mountain in Wicklow, Ireland

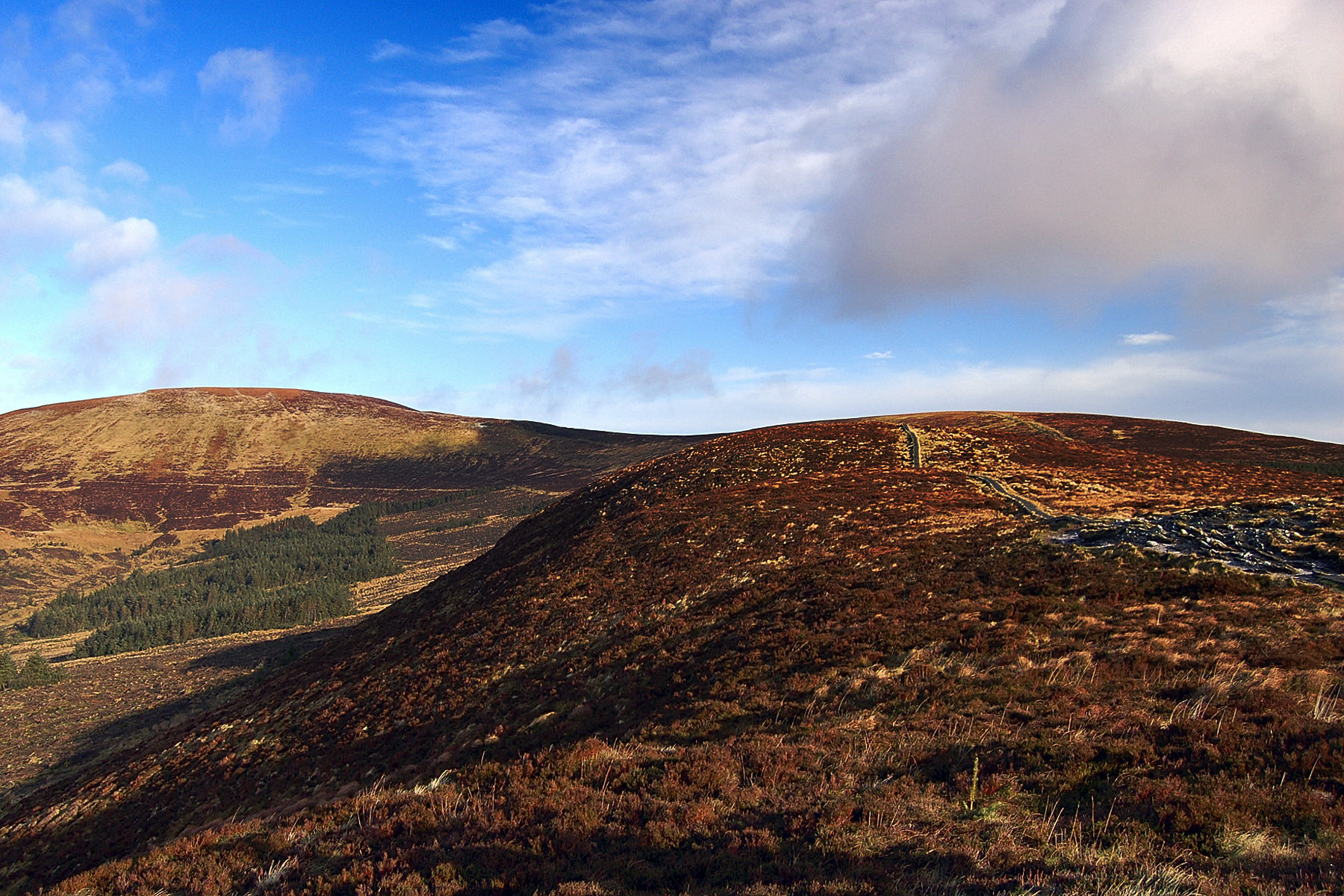
- Djouce (l) and White Hill (r). Note Djouce's boardwalk path on White Hill

Highest point
- Elevation: 725 m (2,379 ft)
- Prominence: 200 m (660 ft)
- Listing: 100 Highest Irish Mountains, Marilyn, Hewitt, Arderin, Simm, Vandeleur-Lynam
- Coordinates: 53°07′51″N 6°14′26″W

Naming
- Native name: Dioghais (Irish)
- English translation: 'Fortified height'
- Pronunciation: English: /ˈdʒaʊs/ JOWSS; Irish: [ˈdʲəuʃ]

Geography
- Location within island of Ireland
- Location: County Wicklow, Ireland
- Parent range: Wicklow Mountains
- OSI/OSNI grid: O1785810360
- Topo map: OSi Discovery 56

Geology
- Mountain type(s): Dark blue-grey slate, phyllite & schist Bedrock

Climbing
- Easiest route: Wicklow Way, from the south (via White Hill / J.B. Malone memorial), or east (via Maulin), on the boarded mountain path

Djouce (Irish: Dioghais, meaning 'fortified height') at 725 metres (2,379 ft), is the 74th–highest peak in Ireland on the Arderin scale, and the 91st–highest peak on the Vandeleur-Lynam scale. Djouce is situated in the northeastern section of the Wicklow Mountains, and dominates the views of the Wicklow Mountains from Roundwood to Newtownmountkennedy. Djouce is one of a few Irish mountains for which the Irish Office of Public Works (OPW) maintain a boarded mountain trail, using railway sleepers, from its base to a point close to its summit; making the mountain even more accessible to the public, but while also protecting the underlying bog and soil from human erosion. Djouce is popular with hill walkers, and it lies along the 131-kilometre Wicklow Way; on its southern slopes at a scenic viewpoint is the J.B. Malone memorial stone, dedicated to the creator of the Wicklow Way.

== Naming ==
According to Irish academic Paul Tempan, Djouce is sometimes referred to Dowse in historical sources. Tempan notes that the old Irish word for "dígas" is high or lofty, but that while a "Sliab Digsa" is mentioned in the Metrical Dindshenchas, the second word is interpreted as a woman's name; potentially showing the meaning of "dígas" was unclear even at the time of the Metrical Dindshenchas (12th-century). The OSI Map uses the term Djouce Mountain.

== Geography ==
The River Dargle rises on the northern flank of the mountain, close to the source of the River Liffey in the Featherbeds; they rise either side of the catchment boundary, the Liffey flowing west and the Dargle flowing east. Powerscourt Waterfall, one of the highest waterfall in Ireland, lies on its eastern slope.

Djouce overlooks to the west the highlands around the Sally Gap; to the east the Roundwood / Calary Bog plateau. It also overlooks the corrie lake of Lough Tay to the southwest. It is bounded to the west by the R115; to the south by the R759 and to the west by the R755.

Its southern and eastern flanks are heavily forested, up to and above the 2,000 feet contour, mainly with Sitka spruce plantations. As these trees are clear-felled (when they mature), a policy of the reinstatement of native tree species is being pursued, either through planting or natural regeneration.

Djouce's southern shoulder is called White Hill 630 metres (2,070 ft), and to the north of Djouce, across a small saddle is War Hill 686 metres (2,251 ft)

Djouce's prominence of 200 metres (660 ft) qualifies it as a Marilyn, and it also ranks it as the 42nd-highest mountain in Ireland on the MountainViews Online Database, 100 Highest Irish Mountains, where the minimum prominence threshold is 100 metres.

== Hill walking ==
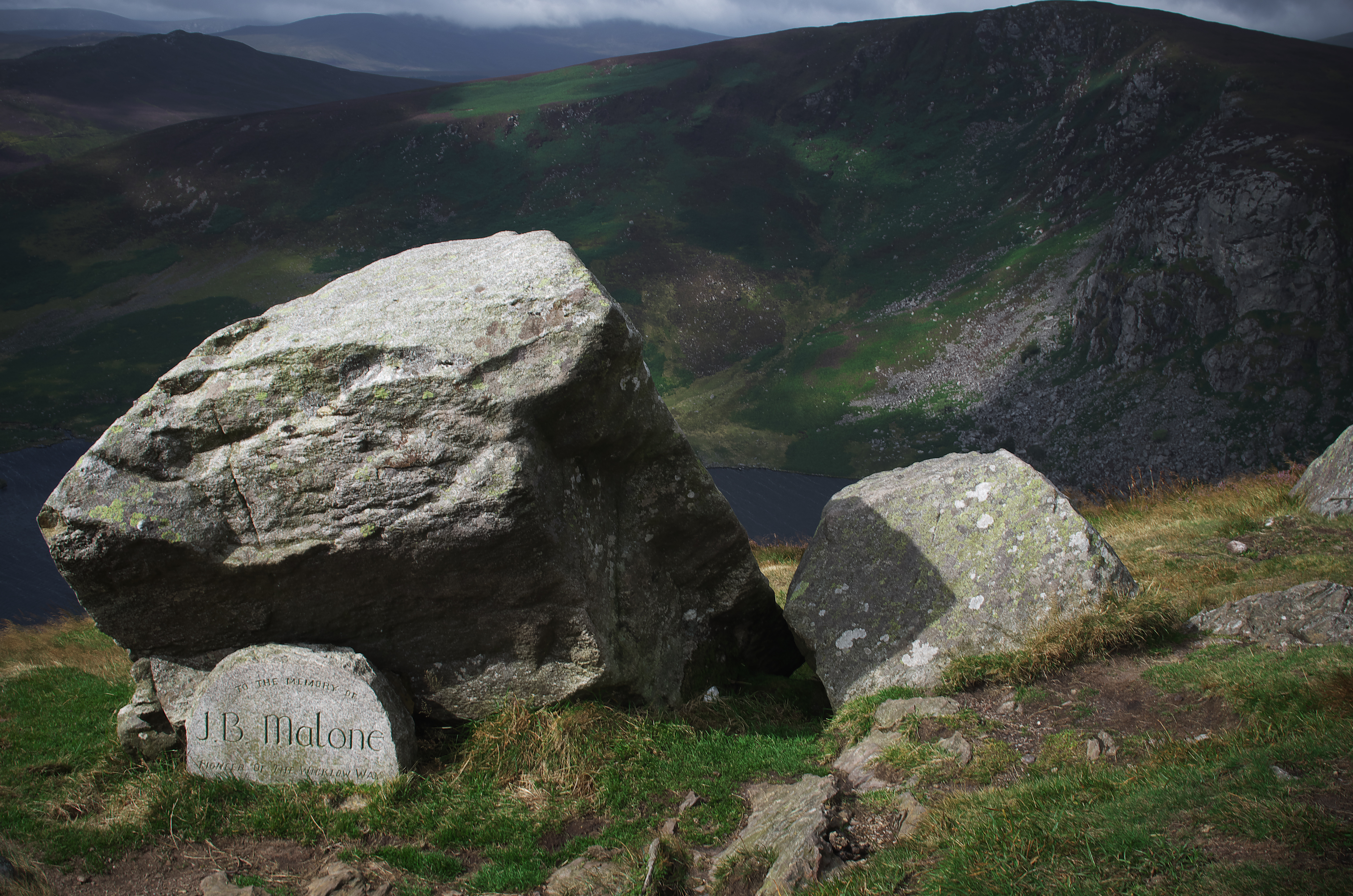
J.B. Malone memorial stone on Djouce

Djouce is a popular destination for hillwalkers due to its accessibility and views offered. (Note: The MountainViews database of Irish climbs, noted that Djouce as the fourth most logged summit in 2015 after Carrauntoohil, Lugnaquilla and Slieve Donard.)

The main route to the summit of Djouce is via the Boardwalk path that was created by the OPW in 1997–1999 using old railway sleepers, and since upgraded, to protect the ground and bog from human erosion. This route starts from the Ballinastoe Wood car-park, or the adjacent J.B. Malone car-park (off the R759 road). The first objective is the scenic point at the J.B. Malone memorial stone which overlooks Lough Tay with views across to Luggala (or Fancy Mountain). The boarded path then rises up to White Hill, before taking a ninety-degree turn northwards to the summit slopes of Djouce. At this point, the boarded path takes another ninety-degree turn eastwards along the Wicklow way (following this path leads to Powerscourt Waterfall and Enniskerry, alternative starting points for Djouce), however, climbers on Djouce leave the boardwalk to take a stone and gravel path to the summit. The route from the car-park and back is 7-kilometres and can be completed without special hiking shoes and requires minimal navigational skills (due to the existence of the paths throughout the route).

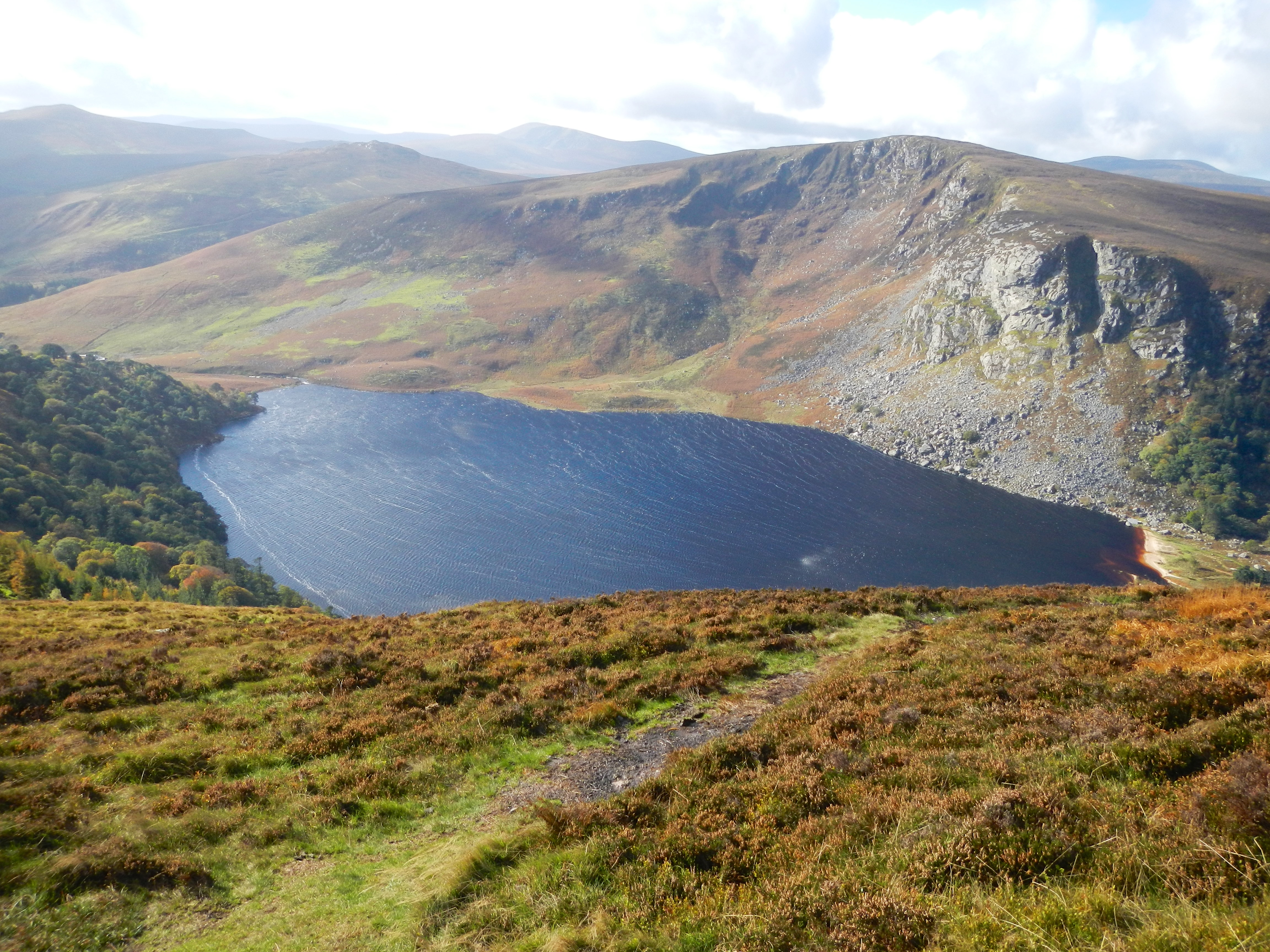
View into Lough Tay and Luggala from the J.B. Malone stone

Alternative versions aim to create a "loop route" by avoiding the direct return to the boarded path on the descent of Djouce, and instead, walking over the bogland to get to forest paths in Ballinastoe Wood that return to the car-parks; other routes expand on this "loop route" by also taking in War Hill 686 metres (2,251 ft) to the north of Djouce to create a longer 15-kilometre "loop-route".

=== Teresa Wall vs NPWS (2016) ===
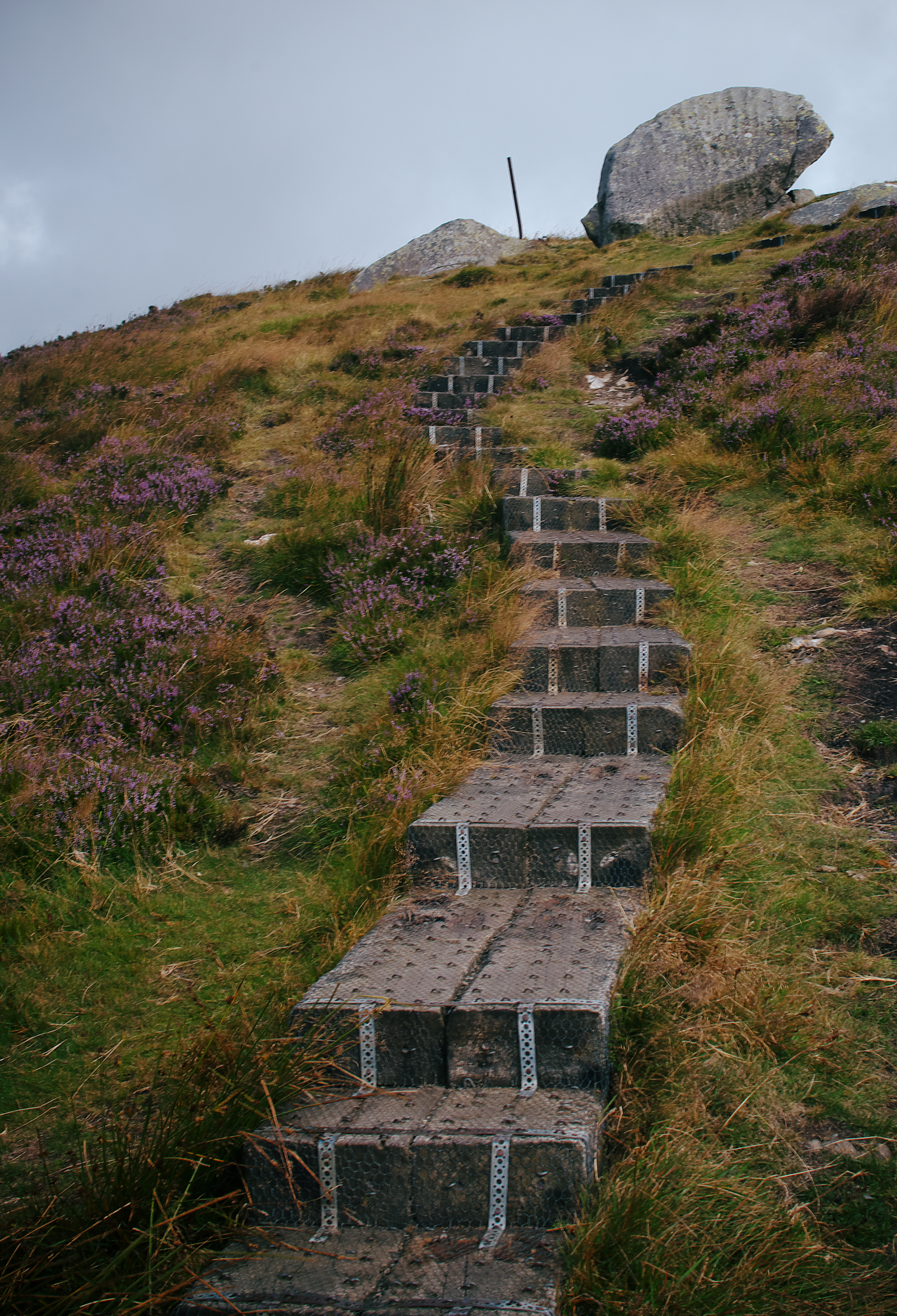
Boardwalk leading up to the J.B. Malone memorial stone

The future of boarded mountain paths and trails in Ireland was put in doubt when a climber, Teresa Wall, successfully sued the National Parks and Wildlife Service (NPWS) in the Circuit Court for Euro 40,000 in 2016 for an injury sustained in on the Djouce boarded walk (she required seven stitches after tripping on the boardwalk and cutting her knee near the J.B. Malone memorial stone); however, her award was overturned in February 2017 following a High Court appeal by the NPWS, which rejected her arguments that a "trip hazard" is the same whatever the location.

== 1946 Air crash ==
On 12 August 1946, a Junkers Ju 52/3m, carrying a group of 21 girl guides on a French government-funded trip to meet Irish girl guides, crashed into the upper south-western slopes of Djouce mountain in very poor weather. The crash completely ripped the engines from the plane, and thus the fuselage did not catch fire; all of the 27 passengers on board survived the crash, although some had severe injuries.

== Bibliography ==
=== Climbing ===
- Fairbairn, Helen (2014). Dublin & Wicklow: A Walking Guide. Collins Press. ISBN 978-1848892019.
- Fairbairn, Helen (2014). Ireland's Best Walks: A Walking Guide. Collins Press. ISBN 978-1848892118.
- MountainViews Online Database (Simon Stewart) (2013). A Guide to Ireland's Mountain Summits: The Vandeleur-Lynams & the Arderins. Collins Books. ISBN 978-1-84889-164-7.
- Dillion, Paddy (1993). The Mountains of Ireland: A Guide to Walking the Summits. Cicerone. ISBN 978-1852841102.

=== Other ===
- Suzanne Barnes (2005). When Our Plane Hit the Mountain: A True Story. New Island. ISBN 978-1904301738.

== Gallery ==
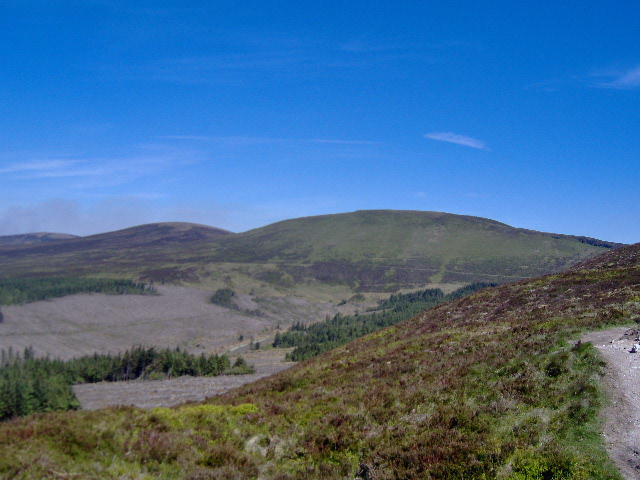
Western slopes

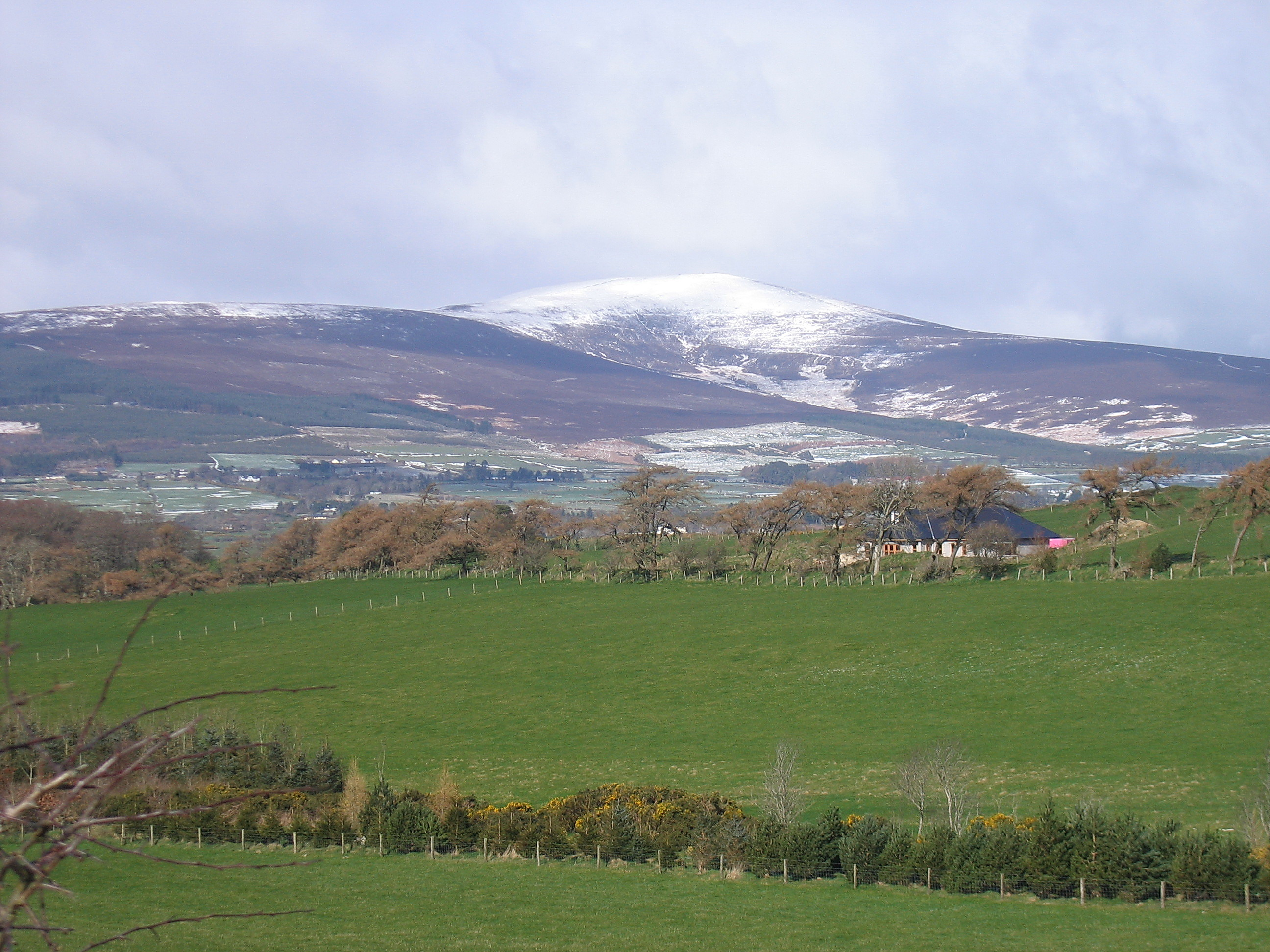
Djouce from southeast

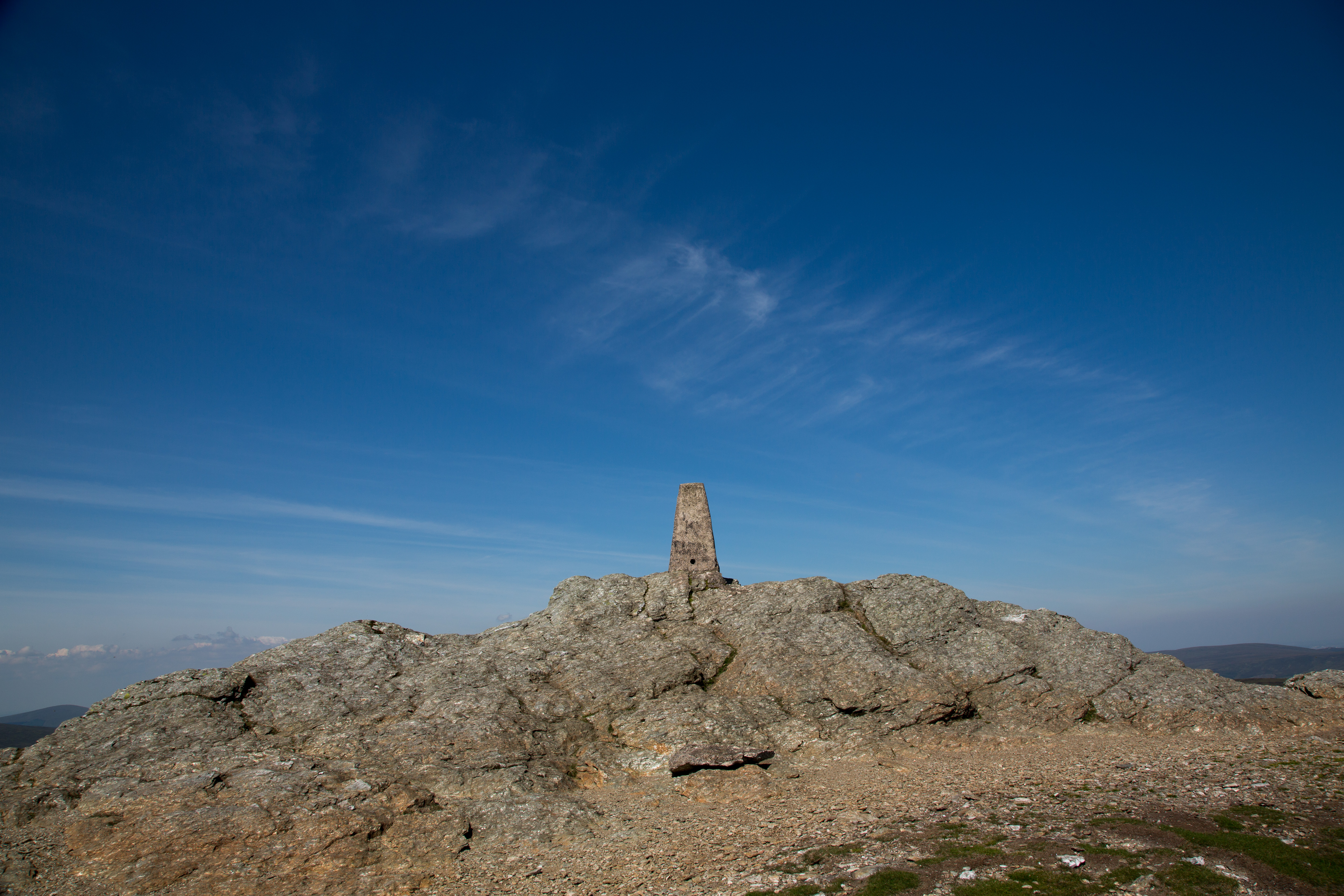
Trig. point on summit

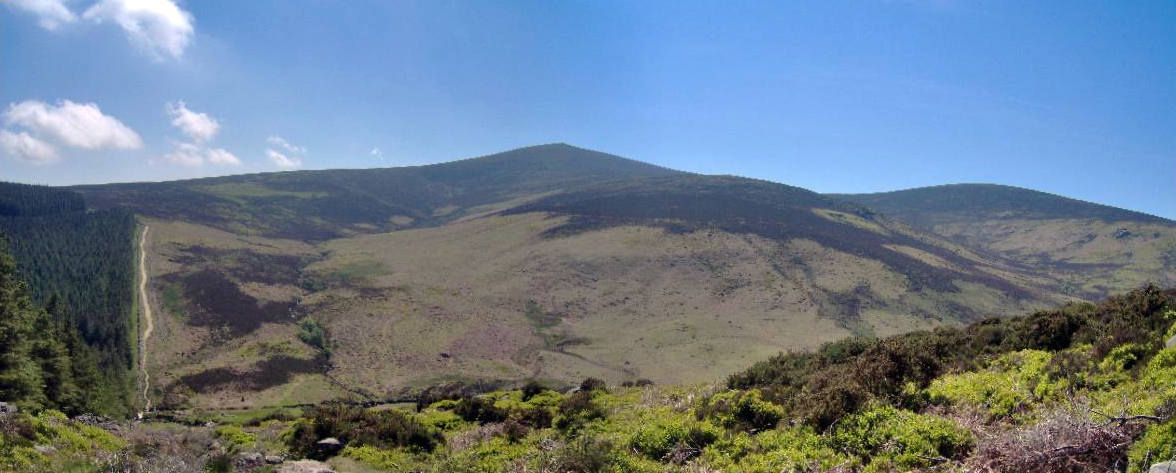
Northern slopes

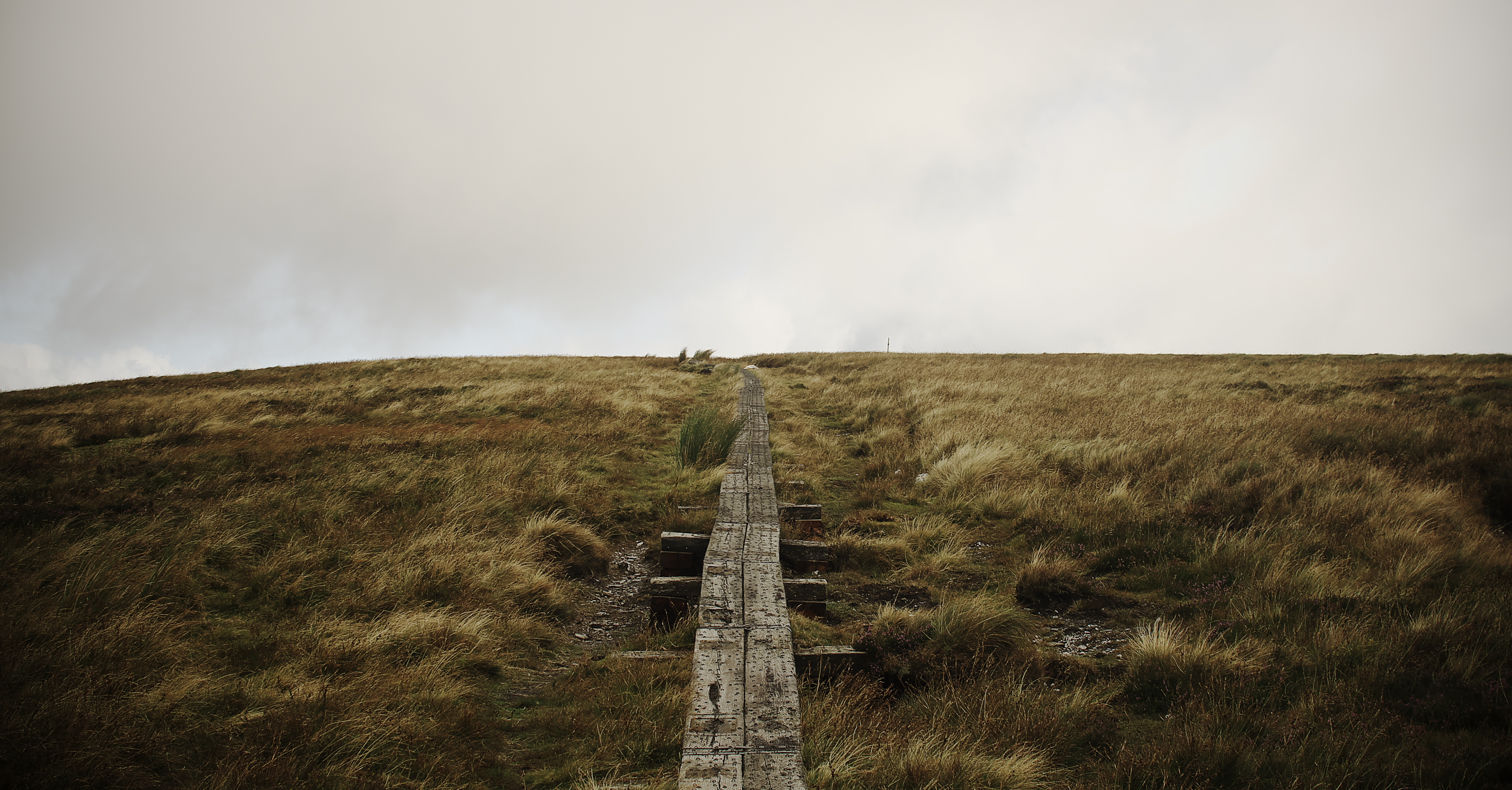
Boardwalk on White Hill
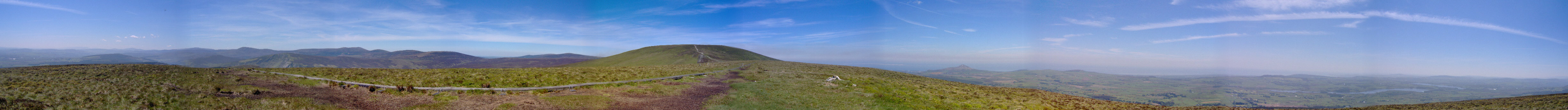
Southern slope of Djouce showing its OPW boarded pathway to its summit

== See also ==
- Wicklow Way
- Wicklow Mountains
- Lists of mountains in Ireland
- List of mountains of the British Isles by height
- List of Marilyns in the British Isles
- List of Hewitt mountains in England, Wales and Ireland
