= River Dargle =

River in County Wicklow, Ireland

Coordinates: 53.2087°N 6.1025°W

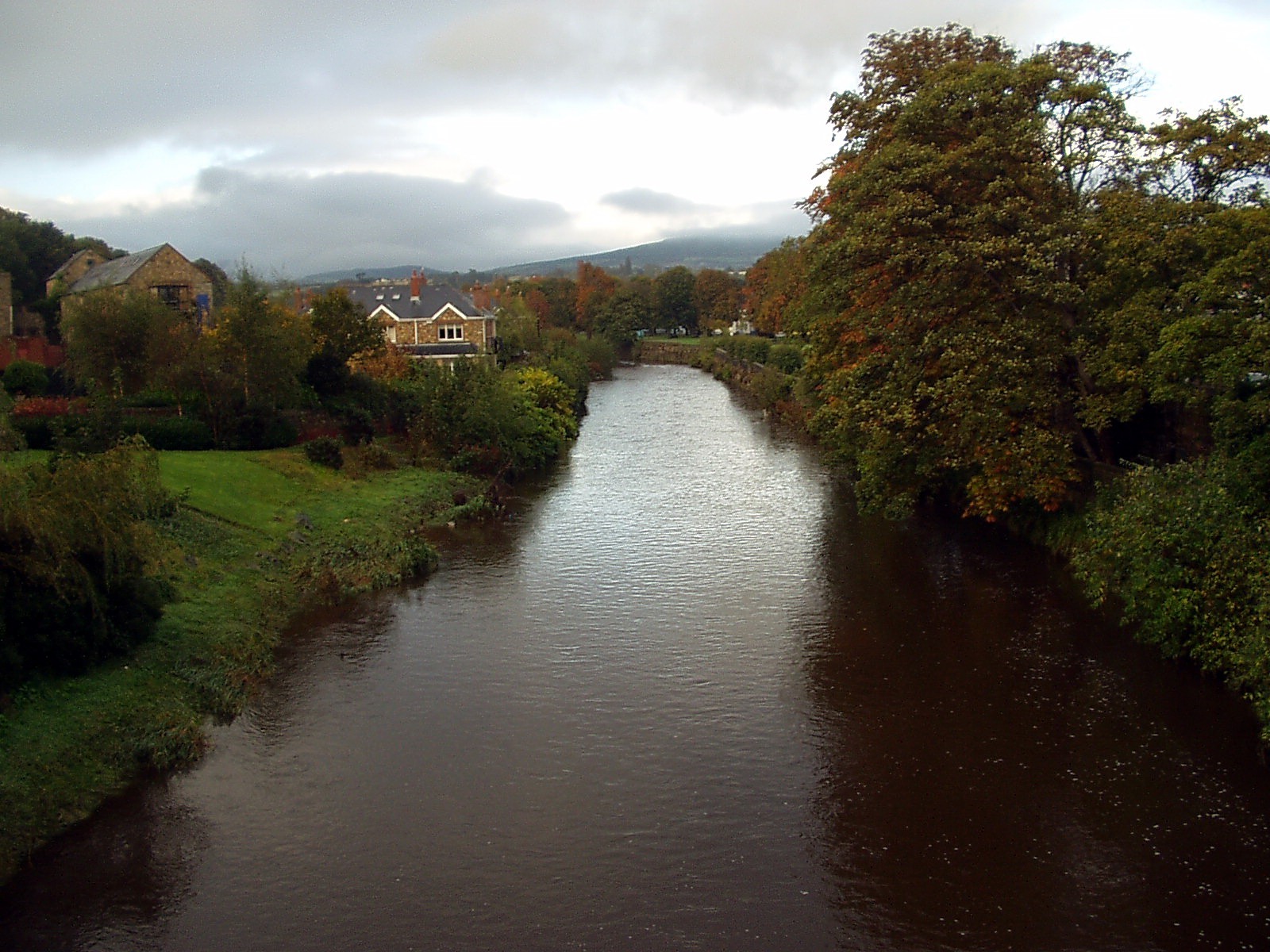
- River Dargle in Bray, County Wicklow
- Native name: An Deargail (Irish)

Physical characteristics
- Source
  - location: Wicklow Mountains
- Mouth
  - location: Irish Sea at Bray Harbour

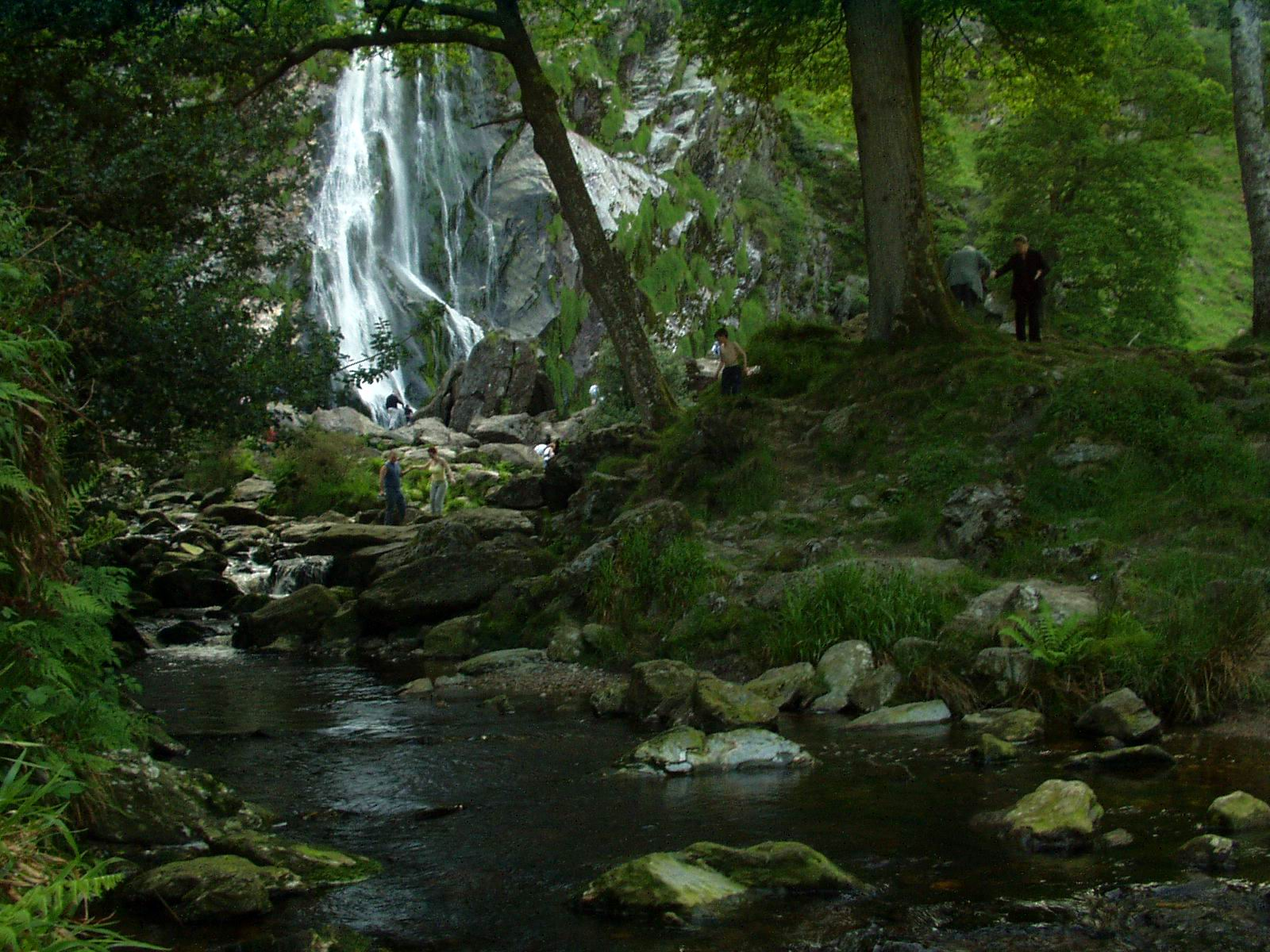
Powerscourt Waterfall on the Dargle

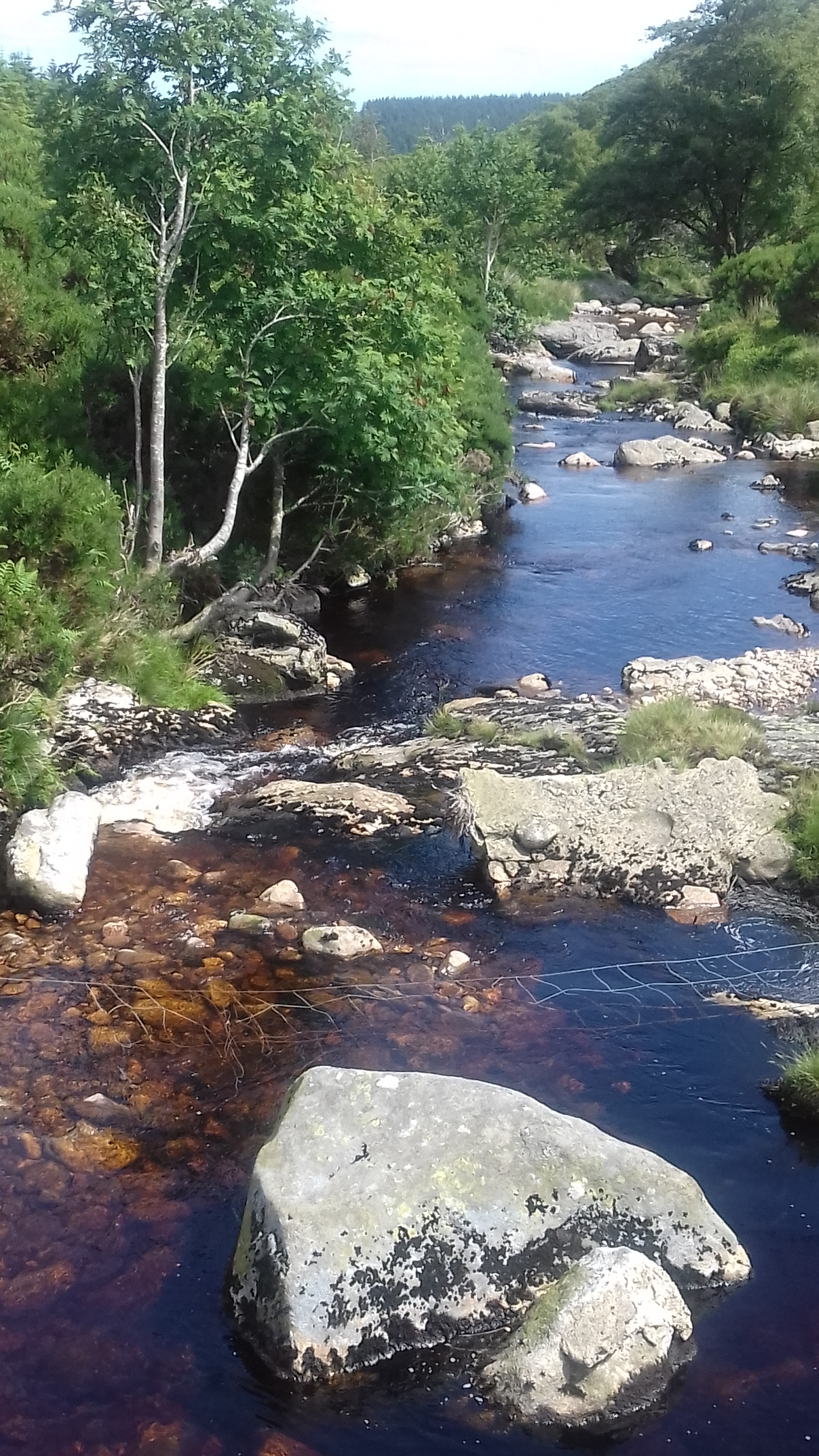
River Dargle at the foot of Maulin mountain by Watergates

The River Dargle (Irish: An Deargail, meaning 'little red spot') is a river that flows from the Wicklow Mountains in Ireland to the Irish Sea. It forms Powerscourt Waterfall, receives the Glencree and Glencullen Rivers, and later the Glenmunder Stream / County Brook, and the Swan River at Bray, and reaches the sea at Bray Harbour.

== Course ==
The Dargle rises in the Wicklow Mountains, Ireland, on the southern slopes of Tonduff 642 metres (2,106 ft). It flows down the Glensoulan hanging valley, to fall over the 121 metres (397 ft) Powerscourt Waterfall. The Dargle then flows through the Glencree valley where it is fed by the River Glencree, before flowing east for a further 13 km (8.1 mi). It receives the Glencullen River, and later the Glenmunder Stream, also known as the County Brook or Ballyman Stream. A final small tributary, the Swan River, joins opposite the People's Park, Little Bray. The final 1 km (0.62 mi) section reaches the Irish Sea at Bray Harbour.

== Name ==
The river's name in Irish, An Deargail, refers to the tint of red in the rocks at its source (the Irish word dearg means red).

== Historical events ==
=== Battle of Bloody Bank ===
In August 1401 the O'Byrne clan of County Wicklow, who periodically raided Dublin, encamped a large mercenary army, composed mainly of their relatives, the O'Meagher clan, on the banks of the Dargle near Bray. The authorities in Dublin received advance warning of the intended raid from the Walsh family of Carrickmines, whose lands stood directly in the path of the mercenary army. Led by John Drake, who was three times Lord Mayor of Dublin, the citizens of Dublin supported by the Walsh clan, scored a decisive victory, commemorated as the Battle of Bloody Bank, over the O'Byrnes and O'Meaghers on the banks of the Dargle. The slaughter was so terrible (one estimate puts the death toll at 4000, although this was probably an exaggeration) that the area became known as Bloody Bank until it was renamed in the nineteenth century as Sunny Bank. The outcome greatly improved the security of Dublin, and seriously weakened the power of the O'Byrne clan.

== Cultural references ==
Sir Walter Scott visited the area in 1825 and mistakenly assumed that Dargle was the name for any glen, etc. He used the word in his novel Redgauntlet seven years later: Glen, nor dargle, nor mountain, nor cave, could hide the puir hill-folk.

Felicia Hemans included the sonnet On a Scene in the Dargle. in her series, Records of the Autumn of 1834. By that time she was living in Dublin.

About 1838 the eminent judge Philip Cecil Crampton, who lived at St. Valery House, by the Dargle, became a supporter of the temperance movement: to show his fidelity to the cause, he emptied the entire contents of his wine cellar into the river.

The folk song Waxies' Dargle makes an indirect reference to the river. Non-religious holidays in Dublin - especially tradesmen's days off - were traditionally referred to as a "Dargle Days" (from the habit of the Irish upper classes of travelling to the banks of the Dargle to picnic and engage in field sports such as tennis, on such days). The "Waxie's Dargle", on the other hand, is a humorous reference to the annual outing of the Dublin shoe-makers and repairers (who were known as "Waxies", from their habit of periodically running a ball of wax along the string as they stitched) to Irishtown on the River Dodder.

== See also ==
- Rivers of Ireland
