= Tonduff =

Mountain in County Wicklow, Ireland

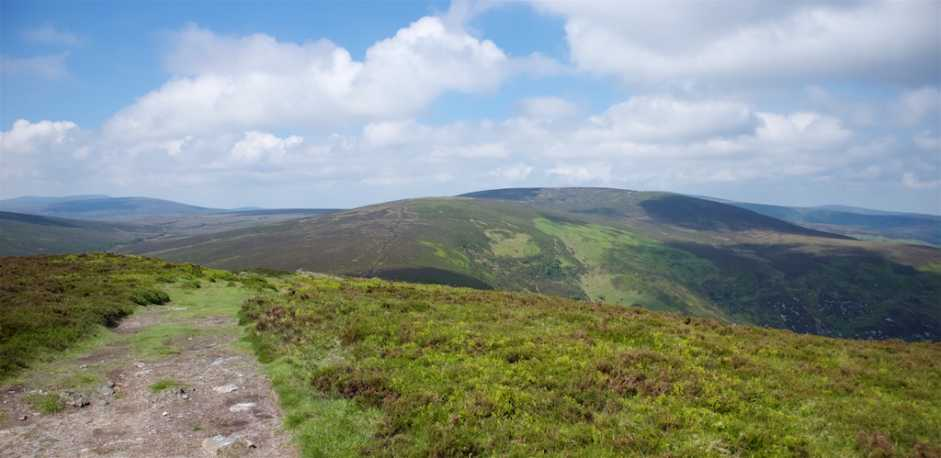
- Tonduff East Top (near) and Tonduff (far) as seen from the summit of Maulin

Highest point
- Elevation: 642 m (2,106 ft)
- Prominence: 117 m (384 ft)
- Listing: Hewitt, Arderin, Simm, Vandeleur-Lynam
- Coordinates: 53.161294°N 6.267332°W

Naming
- Native name: Tóin Dubh
- English translation: Black bottom

Geography
- Location within island of Ireland
- Location: County Wicklow, Ireland
- Parent range: Wicklow Mountains
- OSI/OSNI grid: O159136
- Topo map: OSi Discovery 56

Geology
- Mountain type: Granite with microcline phenocrysts Bedrock

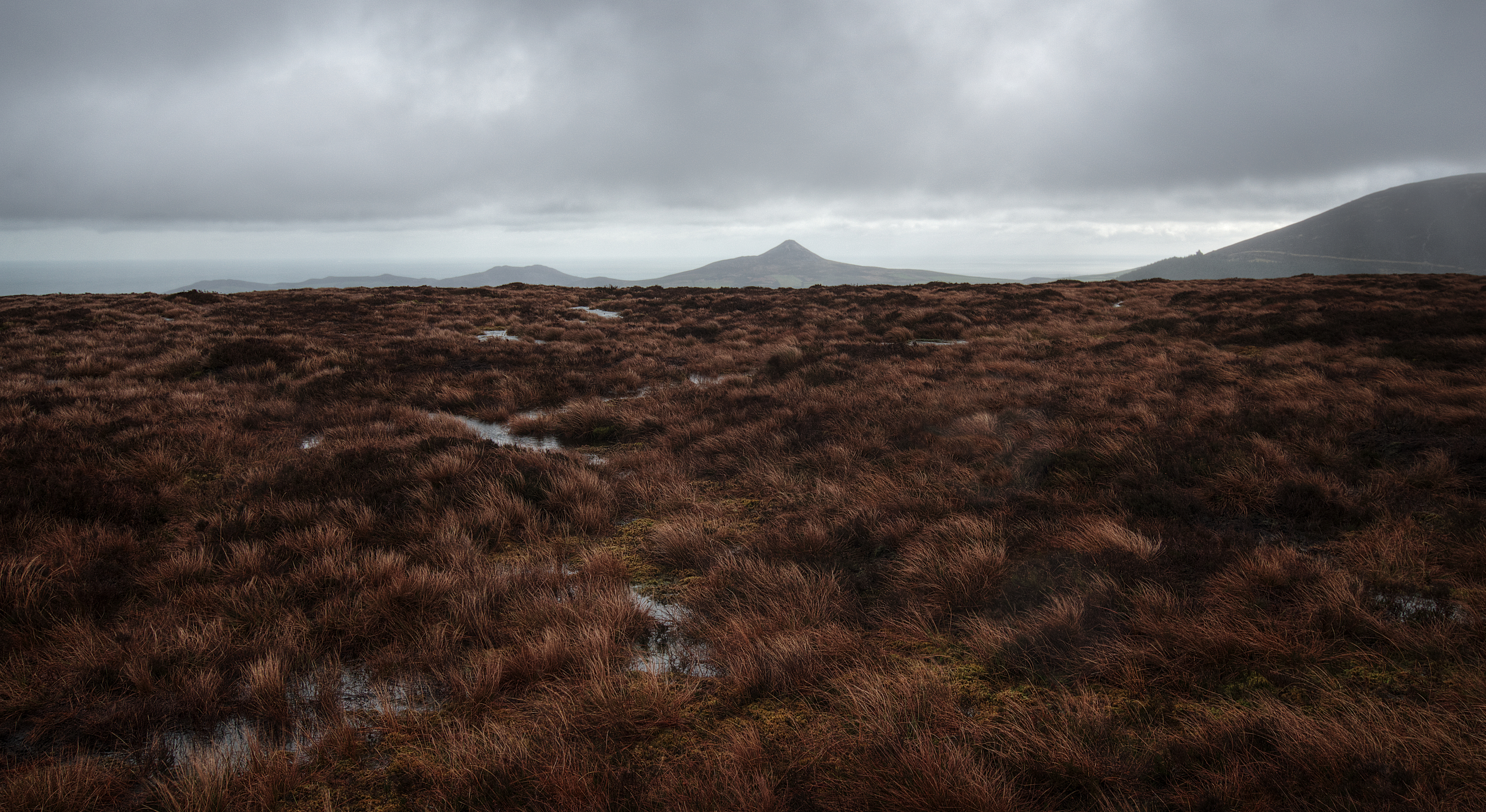
Flat summit of Tonduff looking eastwards to the Great Sugar Loaf

Tonduff (Irish: Tóin Dubh, meaning 'black bottom') at 642 metres (2,106 ft), is the 169th–highest peak in Ireland on the Arderin scale, and the 202nd–highest peak on the Vandeleur-Lynam scale. Tonduff is in the far northeastern section of the Wicklow Mountains, in County Wicklow. The main flat summit is sometimes listed as Tonduff North, while the subsidiary summit, Tonduff East Top 593 metres (1,946 ft), is sometimes listed as Tonduff South. Tonduff East Top has a prominence of only 15 metres (49 ft), which just qualifies it as an Arderin Beg. A bog on the western slopes of Tonduff, the Liffey Head Bog, forms the source of the River Liffey; bogs on the southern slopes of Tonduff, forms the source of the River Dargle.

== Bibliography ==
- Fairbairn, Helen (2014). Dublin & Wicklow: A Walking Guide. Collins Press. ISBN 978-1848892019.
- MountainViews Online Database (Simon Stewart) (2013). A Guide to Ireland's Mountain Summits: The Vandeleur-Lynams & the Arderins. Collins Books. ISBN 978-1-84889-164-7.
- Dillion, Paddy (1993). The Mountains of Ireland: A Guide to Walking the Summits. Cicerone. ISBN 978-1852841102.

== See also ==
- Wicklow Way
- Wicklow Mountains
- Lists of mountains in Ireland
- List of mountains of the British Isles by height
- List of Hewitt mountains in England, Wales and Ireland
