= Rathmore, County Kildare =

Village in County Kildare, Ireland

Rathmore An Ráth Mhór / An Ráith Mór
- Village
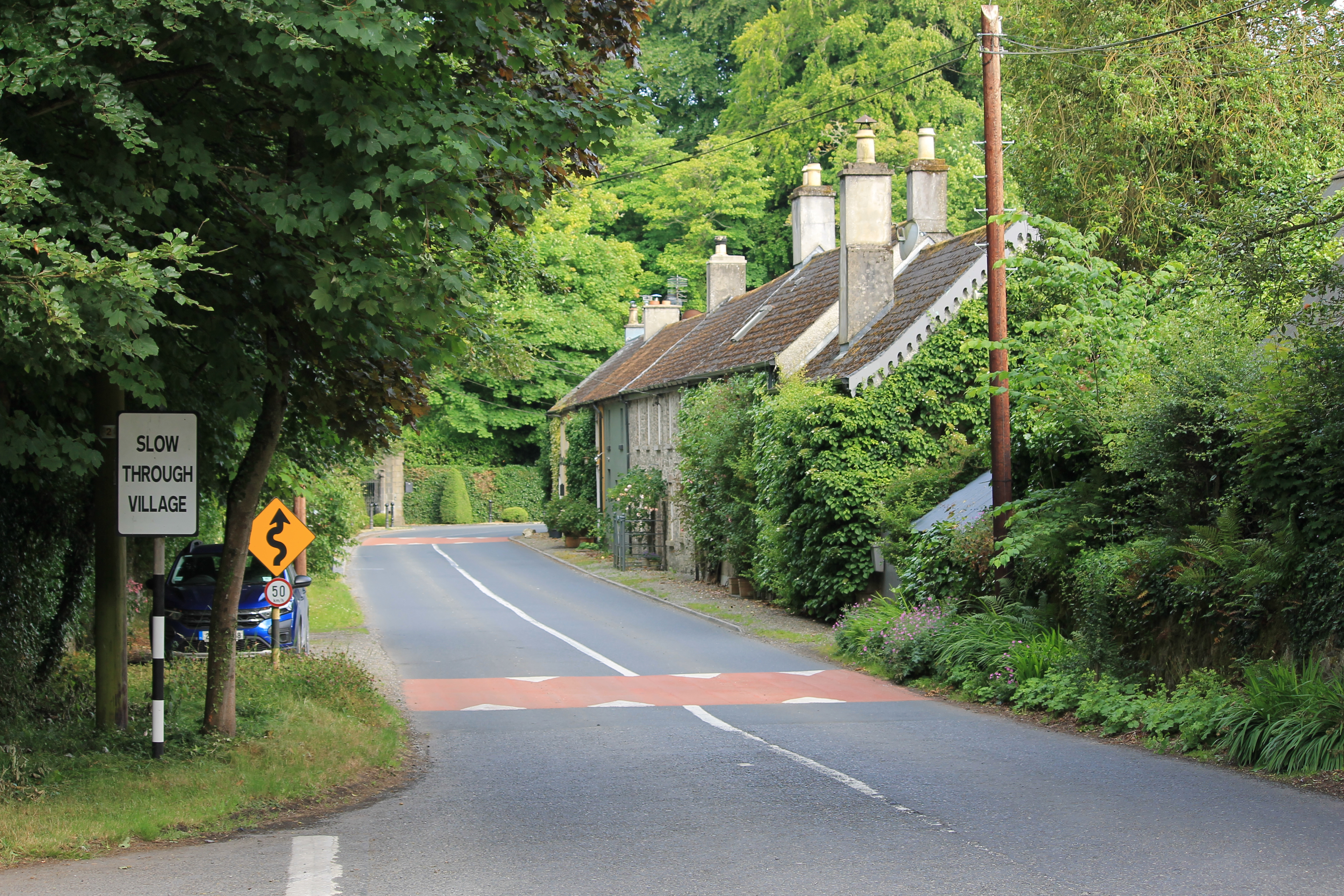
- A row of houses in the village

- Location within Ireland
- Coordinates: 53°13′02″N 6°33′49″W
- Country: Ireland
- Province: Leinster
- County: County Kildare

Area
  - Total: 31.4603 km^{2} (12.1469 sq mi)
- (civil parish)

Population (2011)
  - Total: 1,045
  - Density: 33.22/km^{2} (86.03/sq mi)
- (population of the entire electoral division)
- Time zone: UTC+0 (WET)
  - Summer (DST): UTC-1 (IST (WEST))

Historical population
Year	Pop.	±%
1841	1,285	—
1851	1,042	−18.9%
1881	599	−42.5%
1926	363	−39.4%
1961	383	+5.5%
2011	1,045	+172.8%

Rathmore (Irish: An Ráth Mhór or An Ráith Mór, meaning 'big fort'), a village, civil parish and District electoral division in County Kildare, Ireland, is located at the western edge of the Wicklow Mountains in the barony of Naas North. The original settlement was at the southwest corner of the English Pale, serving an important function as a border fortress during the medieval period.

== Geography ==
Rathmore village is in the townlands of Rathmore East and West, 5 km northwest of Blessington. The civil parish of Rathmore is 7744 statute acres, containing the following townlands:

Townland	Acreage	Early record of placename or variant
Athgarret	742	1481 - Agarret
Blackhall	345	1518 - Blackhall
Caureen	110	1783 - Coreen Hill 1816 -Cowreen Hill
Crosscoolharbour	110	1752 - Crosscoolharboar
Eadestown	461	1518 - Ediston
Furryhill	673	1541 - Firrehill
Greenmount	122	1842 - Greenmount
Hempstown Commons	238	
Newtown	74	1481 - Neveton (?) 1536 - Newtown
Newtown Great	469	1614 - Newtown O'Moore 1654 - Newtown O'More
Newtown Little	23	1541 - Little Newton
Newtownpark	270	
Nunsland	87	1654 - Nunstowne
Philipstown	175	1518 - Philippiston
Pipershall	176	
Punchestown Little	121	1493 - Punchestown
Punchestown Upper	264	
Rathmore East	377	1189 - Ráith Mór
Rathmore West	927	-
Redbog	459	1654 - Red Mountaine
Segravescastle	30	
Slatesquarries	143	1783 - Slate Quarry 1816 - Slatequarries
Walshestown	106	1518 - Walshiston
Wolfestown	452	1627- Wolfenston

Rathmore borders with the parishes of Kilbride and Blessington in County Wicklow to northeast and southeast; the boundary extends along the N81 Road and the old coach road between Hempstown and Crosscoolharbour. To northwest, west and south it borders the Kildare parishes of Kilteel and Kill, Tipper and Tipperkevin.

== History ==
=== Prehistory ===
Cist burials of possible Bronze Age date were excavated within the motte in 1893-1894; the mound may contain an early Bronze Age tumulus. A bronze bracelet was recovered near the motte in 1905. Newtownpark contains a ring-barrow of Bronze Age date, a Bronze Age cist burial was excavated in Hempstown Commons in 1950, and a cinerary urn burial of Late Bronze Age date was excavated in Athgarrett in 1983. Iron Age cremated remains were recovered within a pit-burial a short distance west of the motte in 1998.

=== Early Medieval ===
In the Early Medieval period Rathmore was a stronghold of the Meic Bráenáin, a branch of the Fothairt Airthir Life, within the territory of Uí Máel Ruba or Uí Maíleruba. Their principal church was Kilteel. The Book of Leinster records the killing of Donnchad mac Domnaill Remair, the Uí Ceinnselaig King of Leinster in 1089 at Ráith Mór in Uí Máel Ruba by the Uí Failghe King Conchobar Ua Conchobhair, illustrating Rathmore's importance as a high-status site. The description of Donnchad's death "in unfair advantage" suggests he was being hosted by Conchobar.

The use of Rathmore as an Anglo-Norman manorial caput also indicates the importance of the pre-Norman settlement; the motte may incorporate both a Bronze Age tumulus and the rath. Evidence for an earlier occupation layer under the motte was identified in 1894.

=== Medieval ===
After the Norman invasion, Maurice FitzGerald was granted the cantred of Offelan or Ophelan with the manor of Rathmore. His son William FitzMaurice granted the manors of Rathmore and Maynooth to his brother Gerald FitzMaurice, 1st Lord of Offaly, ancestor of the Earls of Kildare. The grant mentions Rathmore and Omolrou; Kenneth Nicholls interprets this as a reference to Uí Maíleruba. Maurice FitzGerald, 3rd Lord of Offaly, died at Rathmore in 1286.

In 1453-54 title to the manors of Rathmore and Maynooth were disputed between the Butlers of Ormond and the FitzGeralds. The Earl of Ormond was then Lord Lieutenant. A letter from the chief persons in Kildare to the Duke of York complained that the dispute: "hath caused more destructionne in the said counte of Kildare and liberte of Mith within short time now late passed and dayly doth, then was done by Irish enemys and English rebelles of long tyme before." The Butlers were later driven out.

The manor was forfeited to the Crown after the revolt of Silken Thomas, 10th Earl of Kildare in 1534. In 1541 the "manor and castle of Rathemore" was leased to Walter Trott, Vicar of Rathmore. In 1545 the manor with the "castle and watermill there" and lands in Wicklow and Kildare were granted to John Travers of Monkstown, an usher of the King's chamber, for his services "especially in the wars in Ireland". The manor passed to the Chevers family by marriage at the end of the 16th century. The Civil Survey of 1654 lists John Chevers as holding 402 plantation acres in the parish with a manor house or castle and a mill, then waste.

==== Motte and bailey castle ====
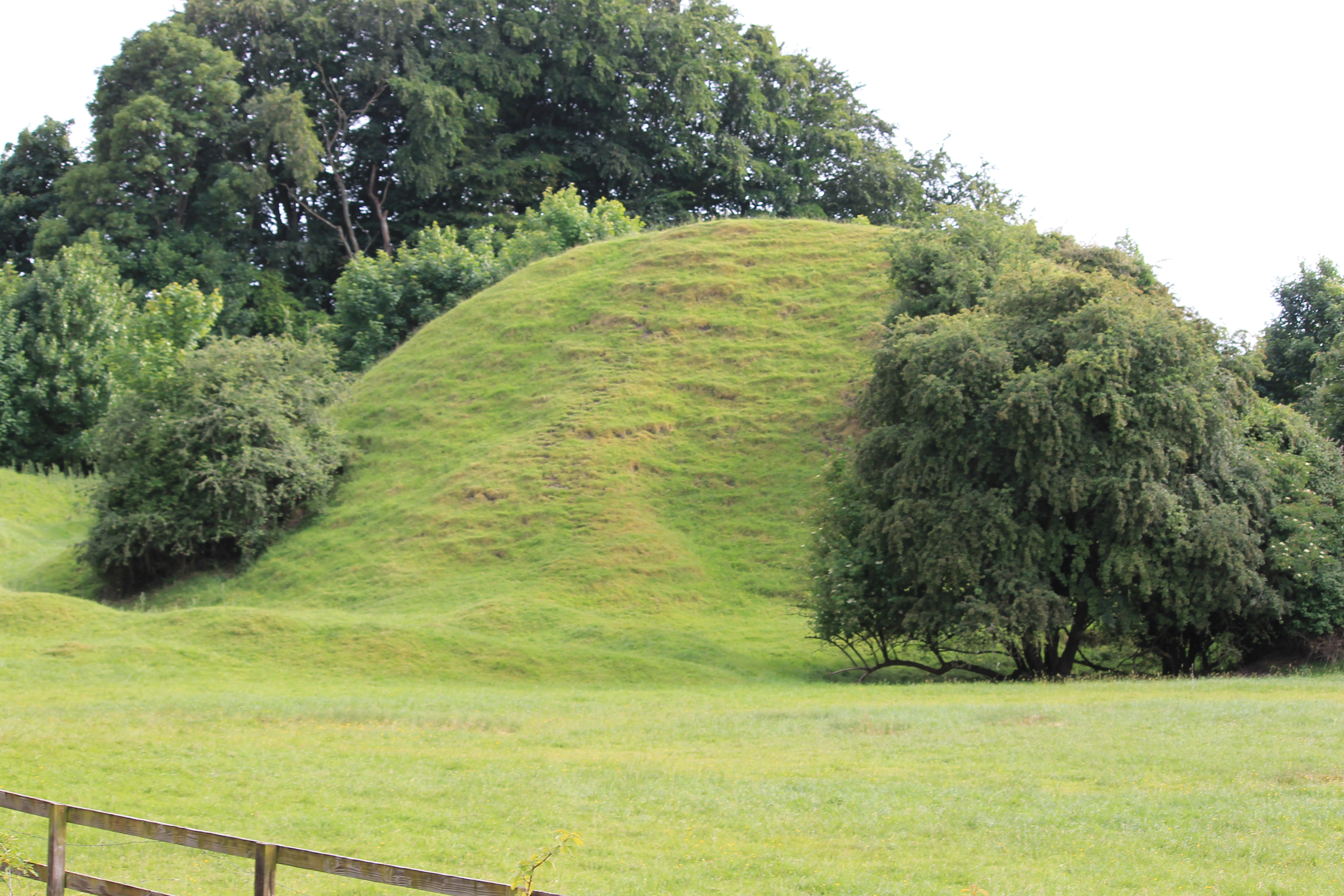
The rath in summer 2024

The remains of a motte-and-bailey castle from the late 12th or 13th century are located in the village. Ten metres high, 46 metres in diameter at base and 17 metres at top, with an inner and outer fosse, the earthworks were badly damaged by gravel extraction for roadworks in the 19th century. An adjoining bailey to the north was destroyed before 1955. The 'castle' recorded in the 16th century and depicted on the Down Survey was likely a later stone building.

==== Deserted medieval settlement ====
Rathmore was granted a borough charter before 1203. In a charter of 1220 Maurice FitzGerald granted the burgesses 96 burgages at an annual rent of 12d with the "liberties of Breteuil". Traces of burgage plots may survive as earthworks immediately north of the village. The absence of references after c. 1400 points to the settlement's decline though the borough still had a provost in 1608.

==== Medieval Church ====
The medieval church, mentioned in 1270, was likely located close to the site of the Church of Ireland building. The 2nd Earl of Kildare granted the advowson to the Hospital of St. John of Jerusalem in 1318. The church was among the possessions of the Hospitaller preceptory of Kilteel transferred to the Allen family after the dissolution of the monasteries. The church was in repair in 1615 but a survey of 1630 recorded the "church and chauncell" as "downe". The current building dates from 1766. Possible traces of the earlier church were identified during archaeological monitoring in 2008.

==== Border fortress ====
In the medieval period Rathmore served as a border fortress on the marches of the English Pale, under attack from the Gaelic O'Byrne and O'Toole lordships of the Wicklow uplands. On 5 January 1356, Edward III, noting that 'the more noble and powerful persons' of Leinster had failed to remain at the wards of 'Kylhele, Rathmore and Ballymore in co. Kildare...for the salvation of the marches against Obryn and his accomplices' issued orders requiring the 4th Earl of Kildare to:

go in person with 5 men-at-arms with horses, 12 hobelars well armed, and 40 archers and other foot, well provided, to Rathmore on Monday after the Octaves of Trinity, or on Tuesday at the latest, to hold the said wards at his expenses, for the defence of the said lands...by the allegiance that he owes the King and under pain of forfeiture of those lands to be present with the said men-at-arms...on the said day, to remain there...and he is to defend those parts against the malice of the enemy.

An act of 1488 set out the boundaries of "the four obedient shires" of Louth, Meath, Dublin and Kildare and described the Pale boundary passing through Kilteel and Rathmore. In 1536 Thomas Alen was appointed constable of Rathmore. In 1538 after John Kelway, "Constable of the King's Castell of Rathmore", hung two of Turlough O'Toole's kern during a truce between O'Toole and the Crown, O'Toole demanded redress. Kelway called for a parley, raised "certain husbandmen and freeholders of Rathmore, Newtown and the parish of Kill" and met with O'Toole and his followers. After a skirmish, O'Toole fled to the mountains, pursued by Kelway's men. Ambushed by O'Toole's men, Kelway's party took refuge in the tower house at Threecastles. O'Toole's men set fire to the castle, forcing them out. Kelway and up to sixty others were slain, the remainder taken prisoner. Contemporary accounts, such as that of Lord Deputy Grey, blamed Kelway. A letter of 22 August 1538 from Sir William Brabazon to Sir Thomas Cromwell describing the events stressed the importance of Rathmore:

Toching the garrison of Rathmore, which Kelway had; forasmuche as it is one of the chief keys of defence against the Tholes [OTooles], and that the cuntrie is greatly depopulate in thois quarters, we beseeche your good Lordship, that none be appointed therunto, but sooche one as shalbe an honest man, that wolbe resident ther, having some experience to goveme and defende a cuntrie.

Friar Clyn's Annals of Ireland names Rathmore among several settlements on the Pale border raided and burnt by Rory O'More before 1577.

A battle on 17 September 1580 was described in a letter from Earl of Kildare to Francis Walsingham. Sixty to eighty kern and gallowglass, led by two brothers of Fiach McHugh O'Byrne, having burnt the "towne" of Rathmore were retreating into the mountains with a herd of cattle when they met with a party of horse under the Earl and Sir Henry Harrington at a ford. A series of charges broke the O'Byrne force and despite fighting "a long tyme very valyantly" the Palesmen eventually "putt them all to the sword savinge two which escaped". Among those slain were Fiach McHugh O'Byrne's brothers, his son and Kildare's Lieutenant, George FitzGerald. Alexander Taylor's map of 1783 marks a site on the road between Rathmore and Edestown as 'English Ford' a placename not used on the Ordnance Survey.

==== Tower houses ====
The castle of Rathmore recorded in 16th century sources was likely a tower house. The site is unclear. Remains of a separate tower house at Segravescastle survive, attached to a dwelling of possible 17th century date. The ruins of a tower house survive within a cluster of later farm buildings in Blackhall. While a ruined castle marked in Athgarrett on Alexander Taylor's map of 1783 is not marked on the Ordnance Survey, in 1983 a range of late medieval material was recovered from the 'castle field' in Athgarrett. All four sites are recorded in the Record of Monuments and Places. The Civil Survey records at least five additional castles in the parish whose sites are not clearly identifiable including castles in Edestown, Punchestown, and two 'stumps' of castles in Walshtown.

=== Nineteenth Century ===
==== Population ====
The 1831 Census records 1473 people in the parish, with 235 families inhabiting 222 houses. A parliamentary report of 1836 records three public houses in the parish. At the time of the 1841 census the parish contained 1,495 persons and 229 inhabited houses. By 1851 this had dropped to 1,193 people and 192 inhabited houses.

=== Principal buildings ===
==== St. Columbcille's Church (Church of Ireland) ====
Samuel Lewis described St. Columbcille's Church in 1837: "a small plain structure, with a square tower, erected by aid of a grant of £450, in 1766, from the Board of First Fruits, which also granted for it, in 1824, £375, as a gift: it has lately been repaired by a grant of £187 from the Ecclesiastical Commissioners". The National Inventory of Architectural Heritage describes it as a Board of First Fruits-style Gothic-style church erected c. 1780.

==== Church of the Immaculate Conception, Eadestown (Roman Catholic) ====
The National Inventory of Architectural Heritage describes this as a five-bay single storey Gothic-style church, constructed between 1820 and 1860 and extended in 1880. The Chapel is marked on a Longfield map of August 1823.

==== The village ====
A Royal Irish Constabulary Barracks marked on the southern edge of the village on the First Edition Ordnance Survey map is recorded in the Primary Valuations but not marked as a barracks on the 25 inch Ordnance Survey map. The building survives in ruined form. A mill marked on Alexander Taylor's map of 1783 is marked on the First Edition Ordnance Survey map as a corn mill, 300 metres north of the motte on the Hartwell River. The buildings are not marked as a mill on the 25 Inch Ordnance Survey, but survive today in partial form.

=== Landholding ===
In 1853 the Marquess of Downshire held the townlands of Blackhall, Crosscoolharbour, Newtown Great, Newtown Little, Newtownpark, Segravescastle and Walshestown. Kenelm Henry Digby held Caureen, Greenmount, Hempstown Commons, Philipstown, Pipershall, Punchestown, Punchestown Upper, Redbog, Slatequarries and Wolfestown, with lands in Eadestown and Rathmore West. Lady Henrietta Geary and Francis Geary held what had been the lands of the Nevills of Furness, in Furryhill, Punchestown Lower, Rathmore East and part of Rathmore West. William Cogan of Tinode held lands in Athgarret and leased Hempstown Commons from Digby. The Representatives of Colonel Southwell held Eadestown and Rathmore West, while Edward Tickell held Newtown, Nunsland and Punchestown Little.

== Education ==
=== Rathmore N.S., Scoil Chéile Chríst ===
The local primary school is Rathmore National School, Scoil Chéile Chríst and it is situated 1 mile west of the village. Opened in 1837, it remained on the same site until 2005, when a new purpose built facility was provided adjacent to the original school site. Today the school has 12 class and 4 learning support teachers on staff. The principal is Mr. Robbie Jameson.

== Recreation ==
=== Rathmore Hall ===
Opened in 1992 by then Irish President Mrs. Mary Robinson, Rathmore Hall (also known as Rathmore Community Centre) is a focal point for the community. The funds to build the hall were raised almost entirely by the local community.

The Hall provides facilities for a wide range of activities for all age groups. The sports of Bowls, Badminton, Karate are well catered for as is Ballet, Hip Hop, Dance, Drama, Art and Yoga.

A community cafe takes place on the second Wednesday morning every month to bring together local senior citizens. The goal is to ensure that locals living alone have an opportunity to meet one another.

== Wanderer ==
In 1855, racehorse trainer, John Hanlon prepared two horses at Punchestown House, situated in Punchestown Upper for the Grand National. He rode one of them, Wanderer himself, winning the race at 25/1.
