= Seefin (Wicklow Mountains) =

Mountain in County Wicklow, Ireland

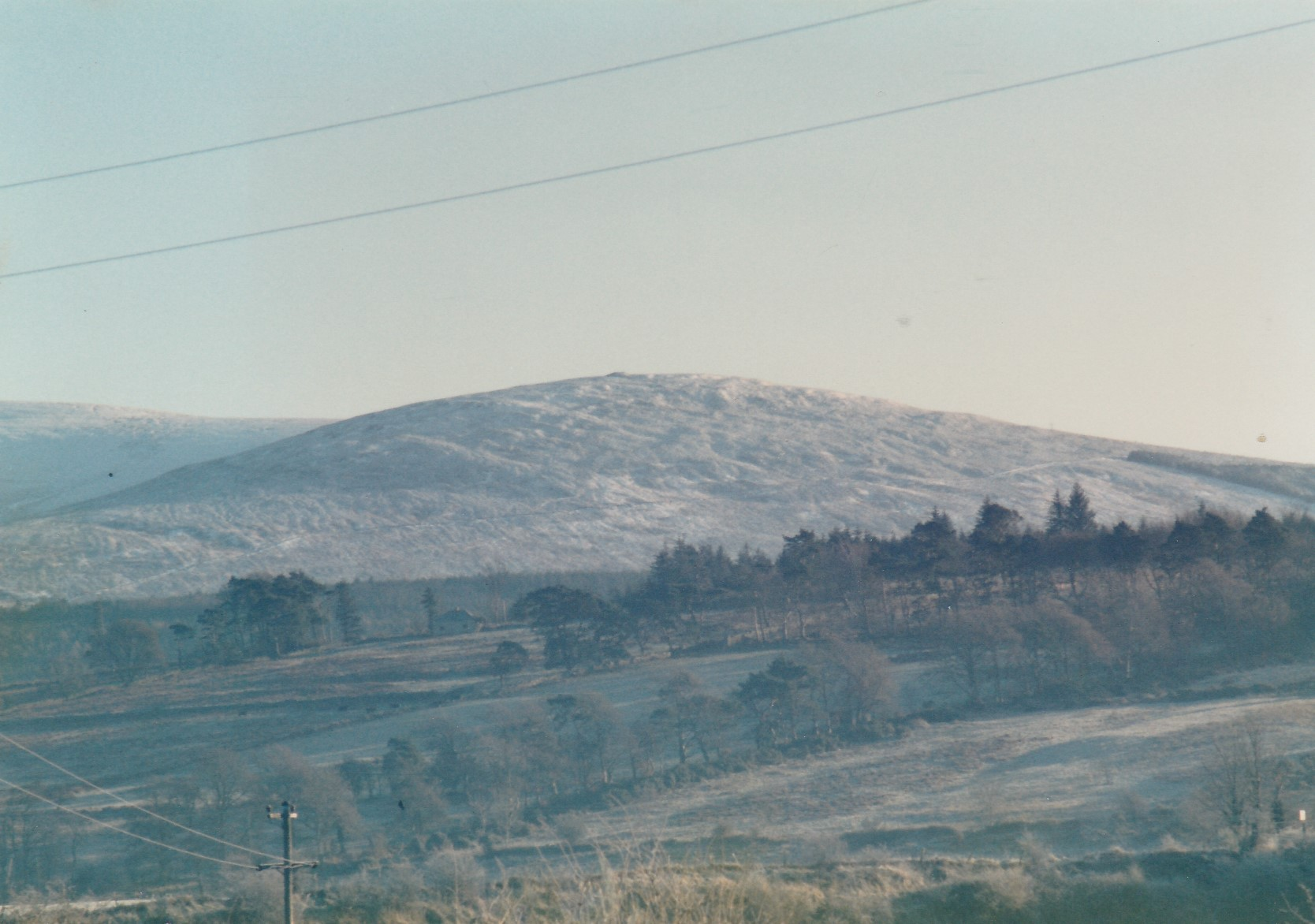
- Seefin as seen from Manor Kilbride, with its passage tomb visible at the summit

Highest point
- Elevation: 621 m (2,037 ft)
- Parent peak: Kippure
- Coordinates: 53.1862°N 6.3948°W

Naming
- Native name: Suí Finn
- English translation: Seat, or resting place, of Fionn

Geography
- Location within island of Ireland
- Location: County Wicklow, Ireland
- Parent range: Wicklow Mountains
- OSI/OSNI grid: O1689511338
- Topo map: OSi Discovery 56

Climbing
- Easiest route: from the L8380 road, or via Seahan Mountain

Seefin (Irish: Suí Finn meaning Seat, or resting place, of Fionn) is a mountain in County Wicklow, Ireland that lies just south-west of the boundary with County Dublin. There are extensive views from the mountain top and it is notable for the Seefin Passage Tomb, a large megalithic tomb which exists on its summit.

== Geography ==
At 621 metres (2,037 ft) high, Seefin is the 32nd highest summit in the Wicklow Mountains. The closest neighbouring summit is Seefingan (723m), which lies approximately 1.4km to the north-east across a boggy col, and possesses a large megalithic cairn of its own, which possibly marks the site of a collapsed passage tomb. The monuments on both summits may have served as "landmarks demarcating a sacred or perhaps political territory" when they were built some five thousand years ago. The River Liffey flows around the contours of Seefin to the south of the mountain.

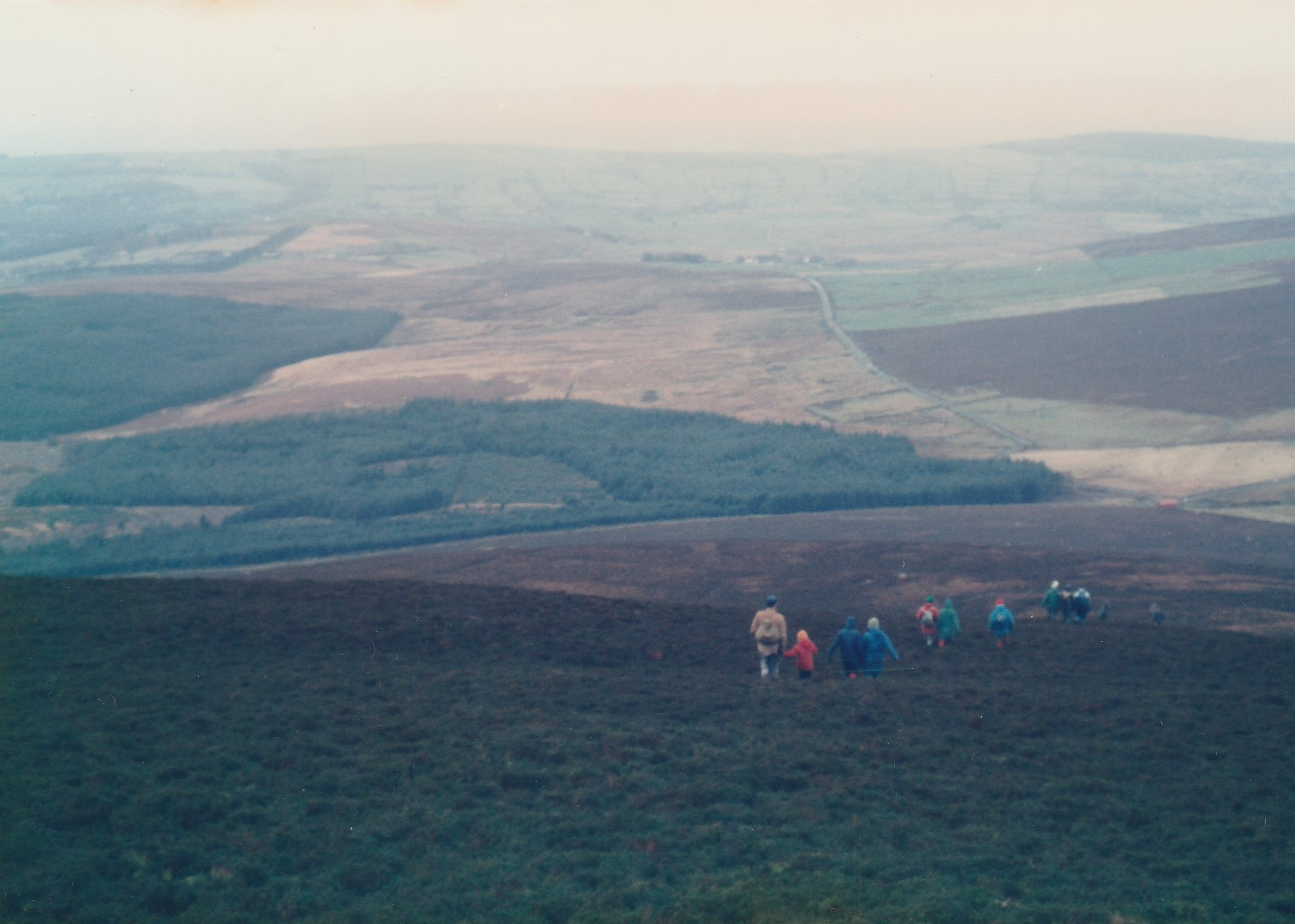
Hillwalkers walking off the summit of Seefin in a northwesterly direction (The summit of Saggart Hill (397m) is visible in the top right of frame)

To the immediate north of Seefin lies the townland of Shankill which occupies a hollow valley surrounded by the summits of Seefin, Seefingan, Corrig and Seahan which ring it in a crescent. Within this townland lies the outdoor firing range of Kilbride Army Camp. Notices at the summit of Seefin serve to warn hillwalkers of its existence, and that live firing is in practice whenever the army have raised red flags.

Pre-2009, the Art O'Neill Walk (precursor to the Art O'Neill Challenge) used to use the entrance to Kilbride Army Camp as the location at which to hold their first checkpoint on their annual hike from Dublin Castle to Glenmalure in January. Volunteers from the Wayfarers Hillwalking Club would transport "carloads of backpacks" from Dublin Castle to the point, where walkers could change out of their walking shoes into hiking boots (and put on head torches) in preparation for the upcoming off-road mountain section to Glenmalure.

As on neighbouring Seefingan, there are extensive views from Seefin across to the mountains of west Wicklow, Mullaghcleevaun, Poulaphouca Reservoir and the prominent communication masts on top of Kippure. Views towards Dublin however, are largely obscured by Seefingan.

== Megalithic tomb ==
A Neolithic passage tomb built around 5,000 years ago (3,000 B.C.) by the region's first farmers exists on the summit of Seefin. It, alongside other megalithic monuments on the summits of nearby Seefingan and Seahan, form part of what the Wicklow tourism office has described as "an extended network of hilltop passage tombs dotted throughout the Dublin-Wicklow area". The office added:

Crucially, intervisibility between monuments seems to have been an important feature of this network, which suggests the tombs may have served as landmarks demarcating a sacred or perhaps political territory. Accordingly, the sweeping views enjoyed from atop Seefin, Seahan and Seefingan likely played a part in the selection of these mountains as passage tomb sites.

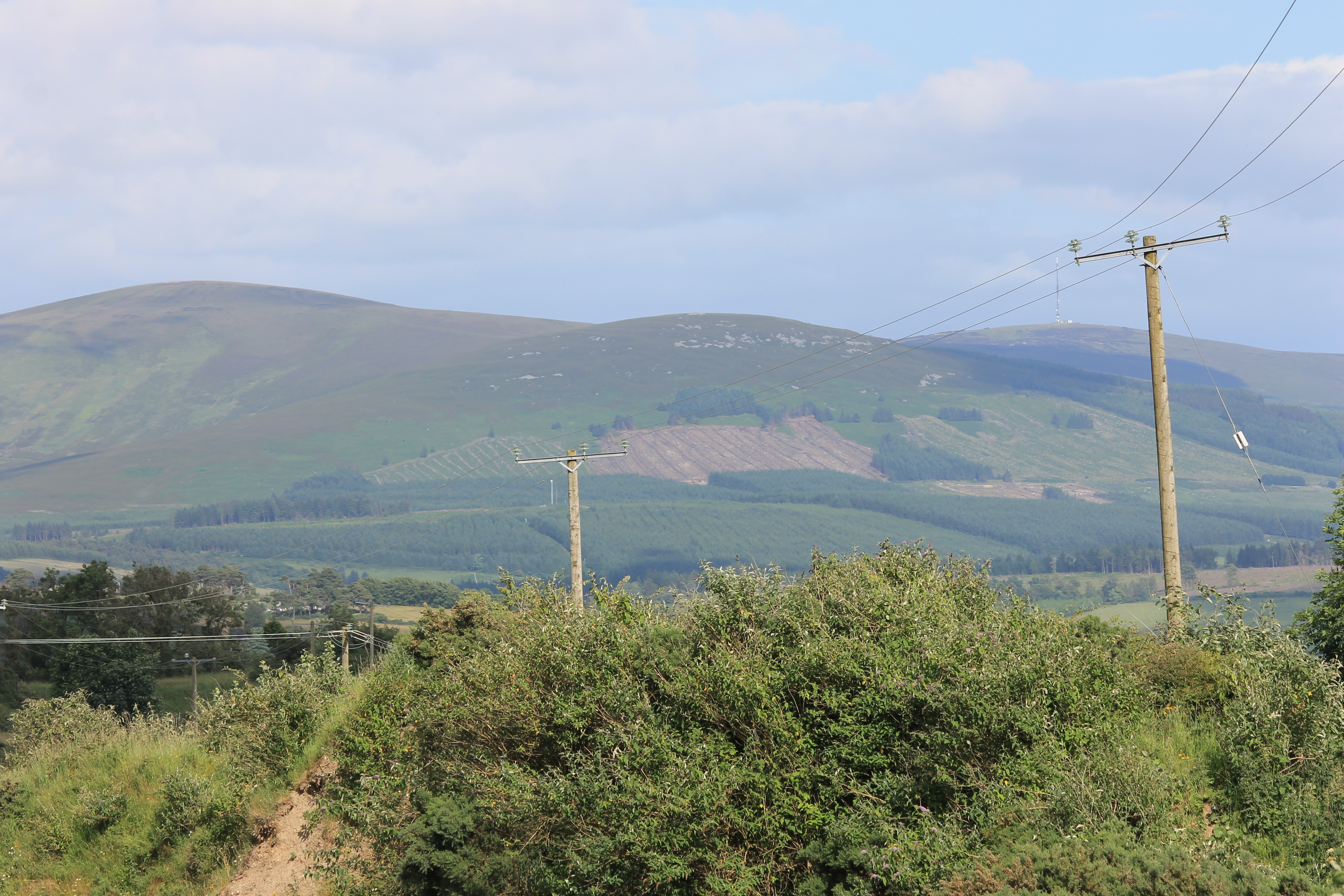
View of Seefingan (left), Seefin (middle) and Kippure (right) from Blessington

== Etymology ==
According to the Wicklow tourism office, over the ensuing millennia the original purpose and meaning of the passage tombs atop Seefin and Seefingan would have eventually been forgotten, and the local societies began attributing new myths and significance to the landmarks:

The mythological significance associated with the passage tombs at Seefin and Seefingan is revealed by the mountains' Irish names – Suí Finn and Suí Fionnagáin – meaning 'seat of Fionn', referring to the legendary hero Fionn mac Cumhaill, leader of the Fianna warrior band.

As per Wicklow tourism, mac Cumhaill's connection to these mountains in particular "likely stems from the fact" that both Seefin and Seefingan are close to the valley of Glenasmole, "famed as a favourite hunting-ground of the Fianna".

Numerous landforms connected to Fionn mac Cumhaill have been identified in Ireland according to Archaeology Ireland, including "accessible hills between 45m and 200m OD and some mountain summits over 300m, most of which are crowned with cairns". The journal linked the mac Cumhaill placenaming in Ireland to a form of geomythology in which pre-scientific cultures attempted to understand geological events, processes and unusual topography and geology by attributing them with their own mythology.

== See also ==
- List of mountains in Ireland
