= Threecastles Castle =

Irish National Monument - castle in County Wicklow

- Caisleán Bhaile na dTrí Chaisleán (Irish)
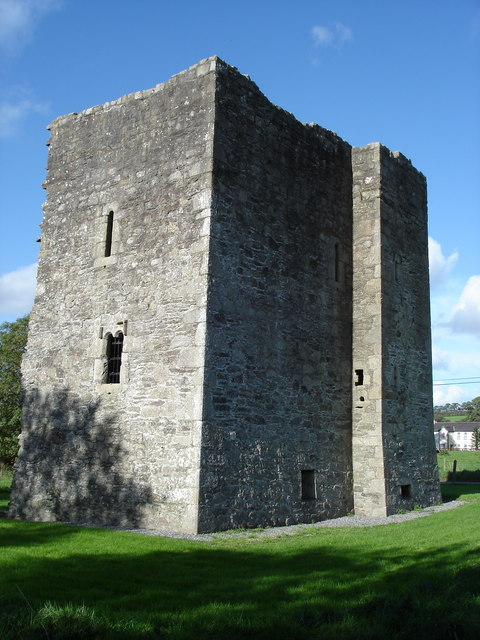
- Interactive map of Threecastles Castle
- 53°10′54″N 6°29′15″W
- Location: Blessington, County Wicklow, Ireland

History
- Built: 1500s

National monument of Ireland
- Official name: Threecastles Castle
- Reference no.: 491

Threecastles Castle is a three-storey tower house situated near Blessington, County Wicklow, Ireland. Probably built in the 16th century, the castle is protected as a national monument.

== Description ==
Threecastles Castle is a rectangular three-storey tower house, with a stair turret projecting from the north east corner. The walls are four to five feet thick, and are faced with cut granite. The castle was built on an east facing slope overlooking a ford on the River Liffey, where stepping stones crossing the river were also marked on an early 20th century map. With the damming of the River Liffey at Poulaphouca in 1940 and subsequent flooding of the valley, the river depth rose and is now too deep to cross. Much of the area south of the castle is now a flat marsh leading to the lakeshore.

== History ==
The history of the castle is unclear, but it is believed that due to the castle's name there were more than one castle in the townland. Of the other two castles, the site of one is known from a 19th-century Ordnance Survey, the third castle's site is unknown. It was probably built by Lord Deputy Gerald Fitzgerald, 8th earl of Kildare, in the 16th century. It was the site of a number of battles in the 1500s. Some sources speculate that the 'three' refers to the castle having three parts.

Local historian Vincent Byrne recounts events that happened near the castle in 1538:

"...The first recorded instance of loss of life in such confrontational circumstances occurred in 1538 and was recorded in the papers of Henry VIII. The constable of Rathmore, John Kelway, had executed two members of the O'Toole clan for poaching. O'Toole demanded an explanation for the drastic action and a meeting was arranged at Three Castles in Blessington. Neither side displayed any trust and in the inevitable confrontation Kelway was killed. In the altercation, Kelway's men killed a local farmer and his labourers by setting fire to their thatched farmhouse. It is reported that up to sixty householders were killed by Kelway's men".

== Gallery ==
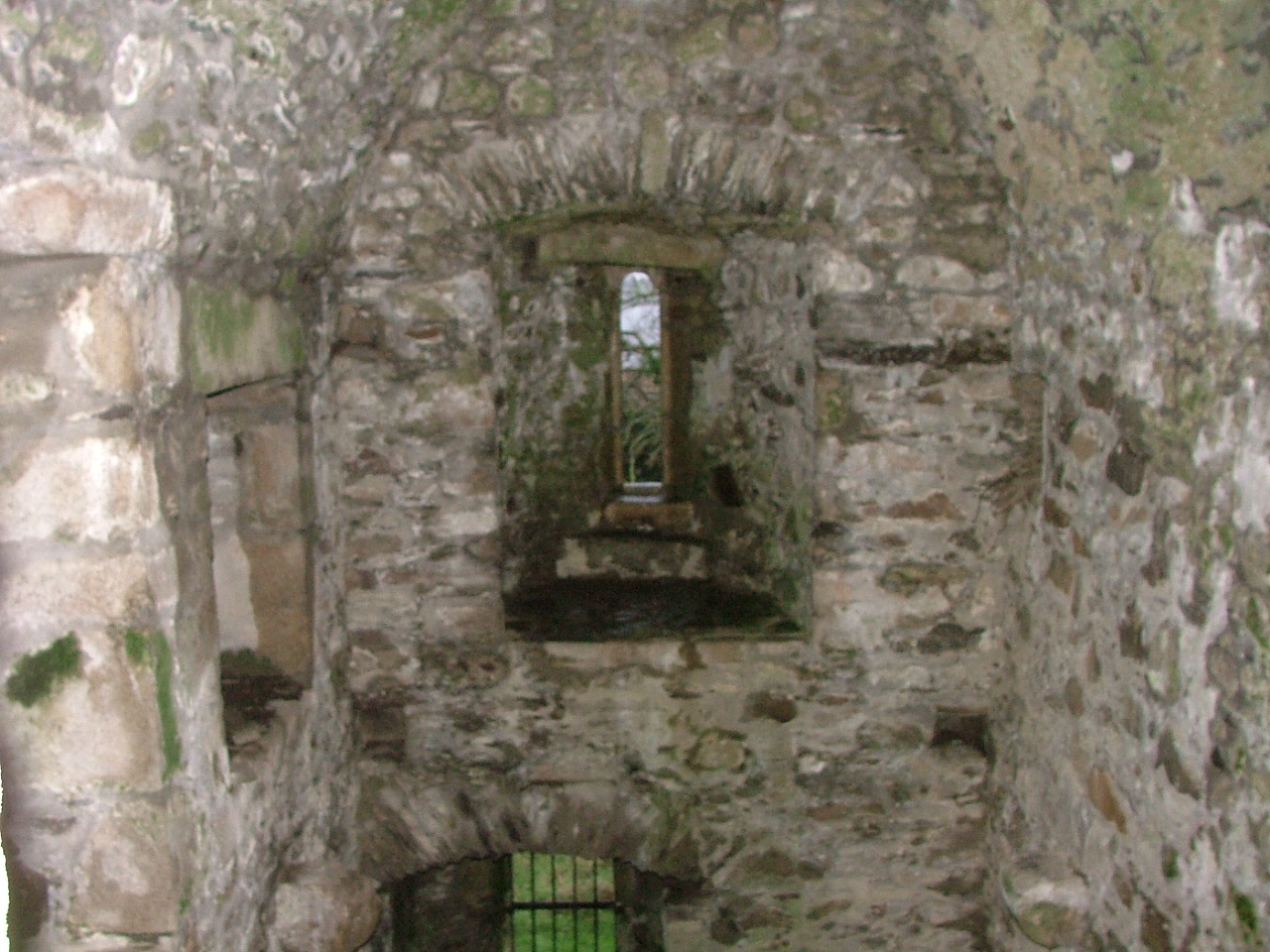
Interior of castle

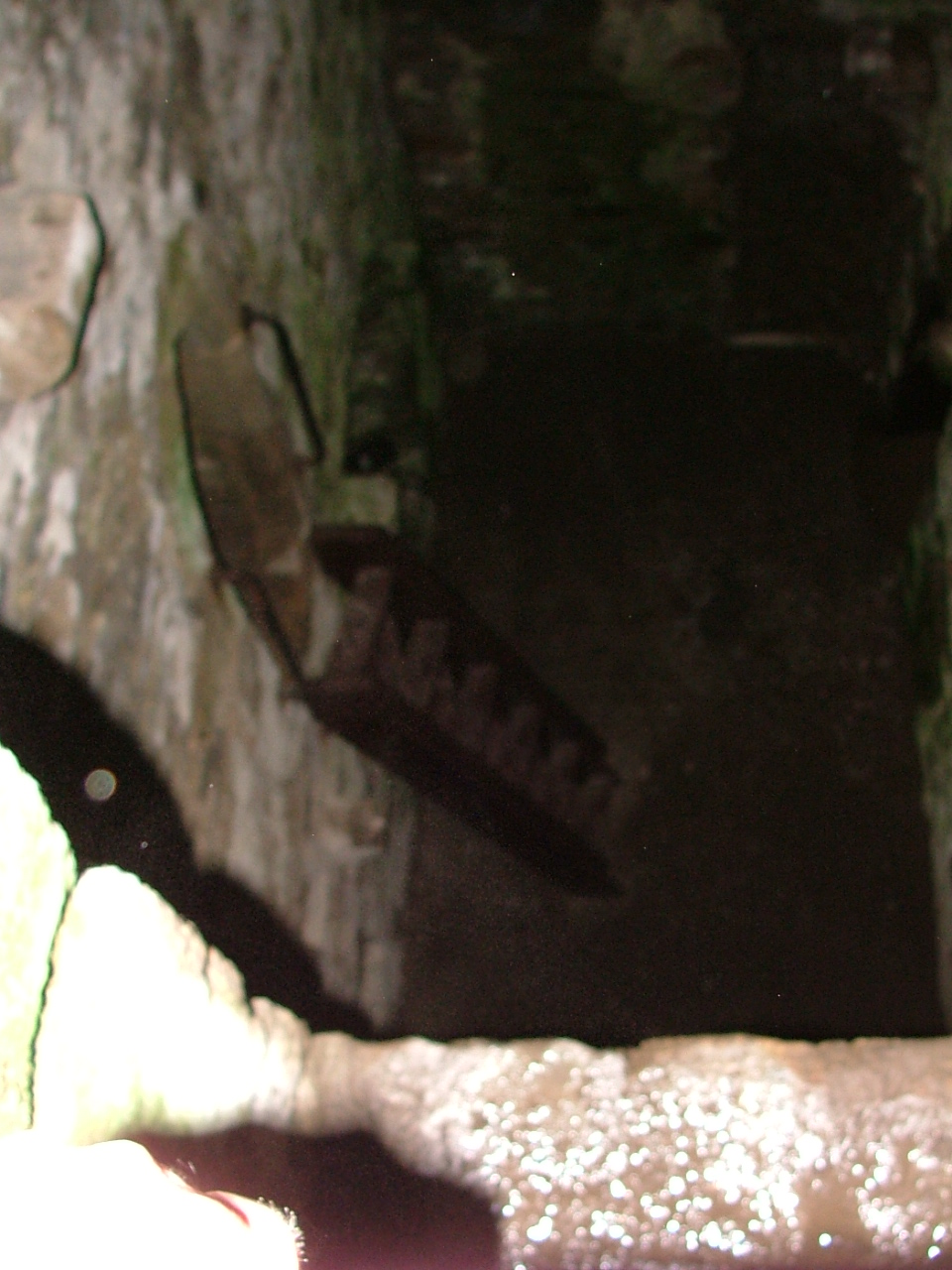
Interior of castle

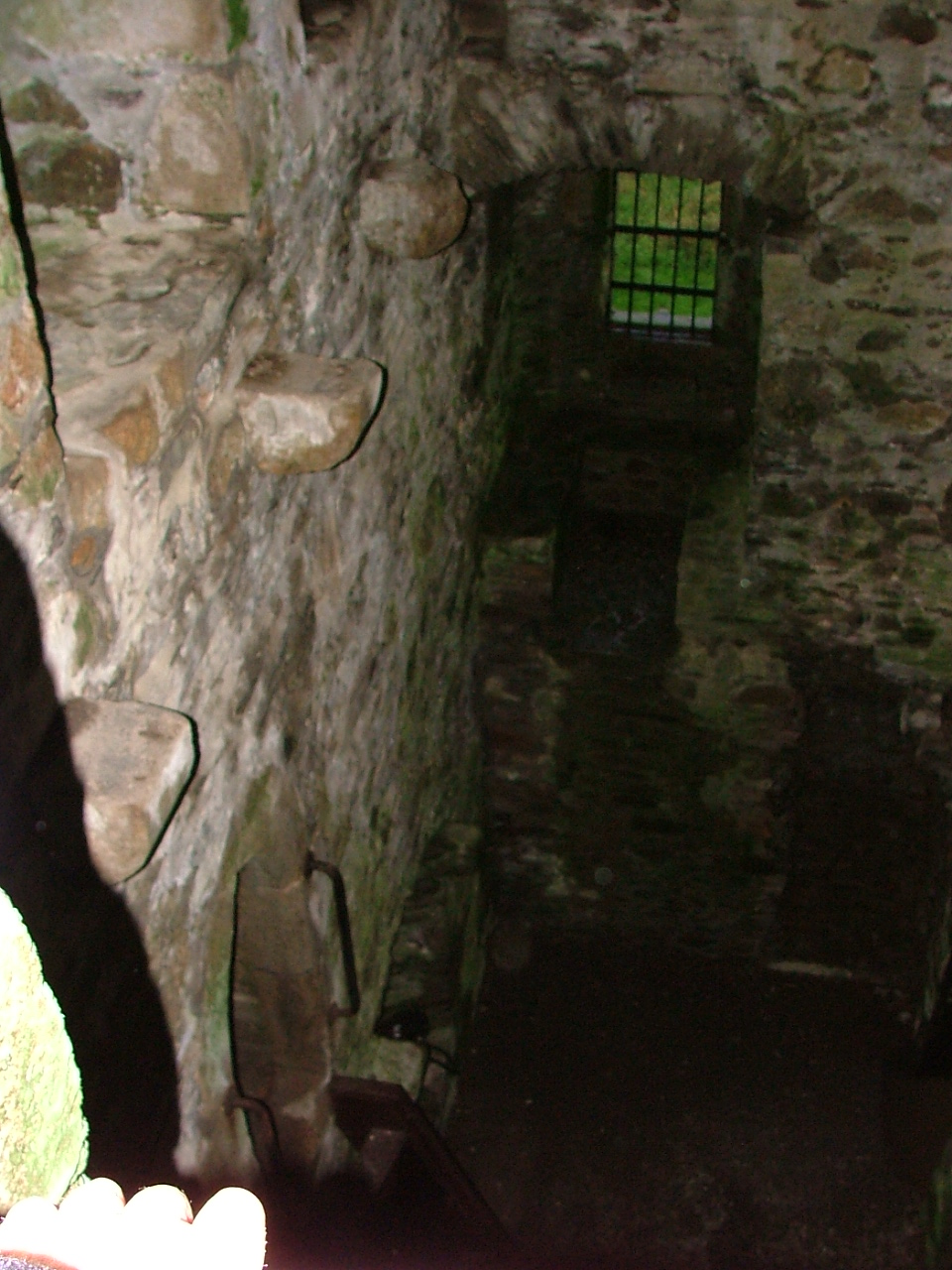
Interior of castle

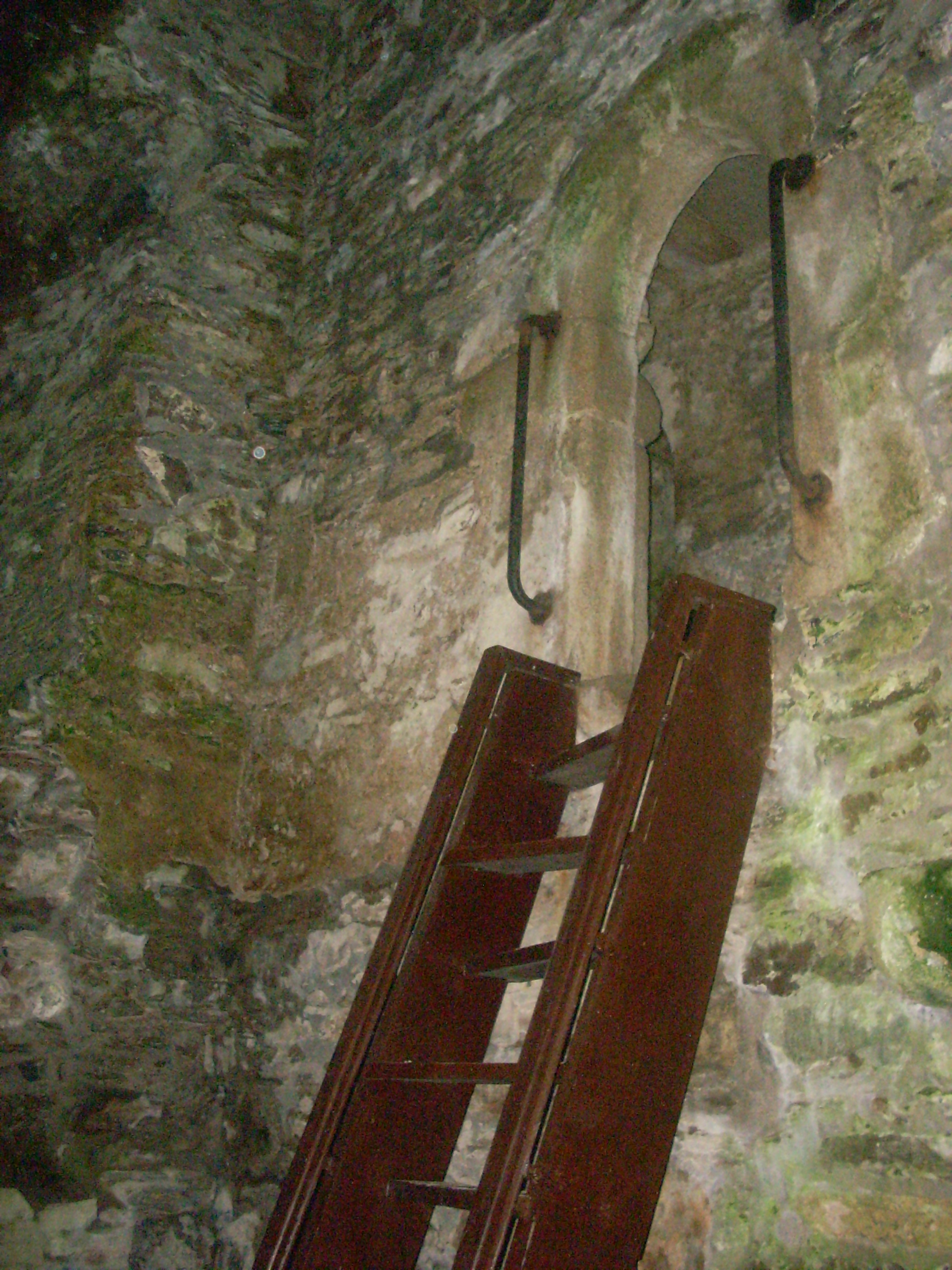
Ladder inside the castle

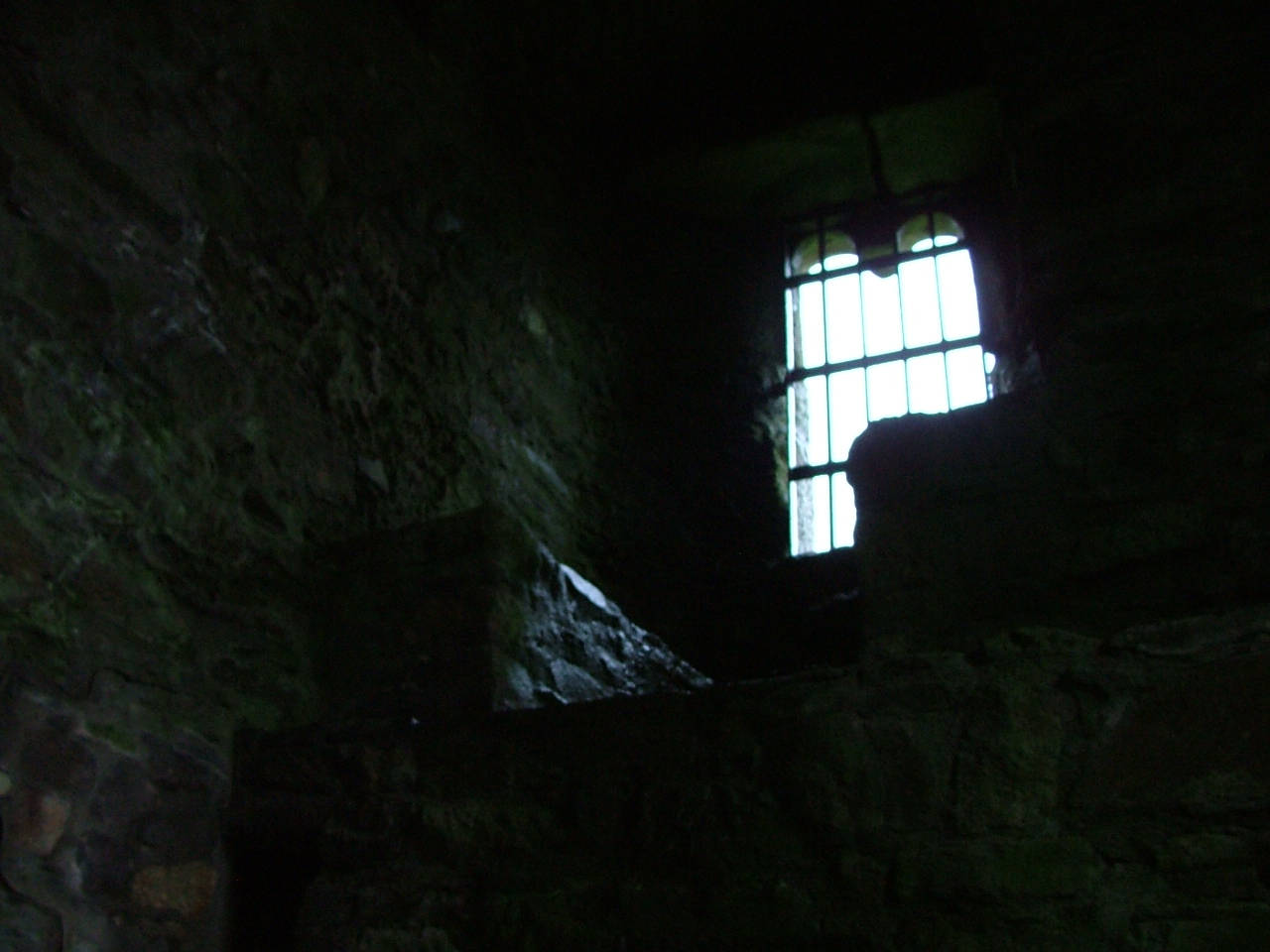
Interior of one of the castle windows

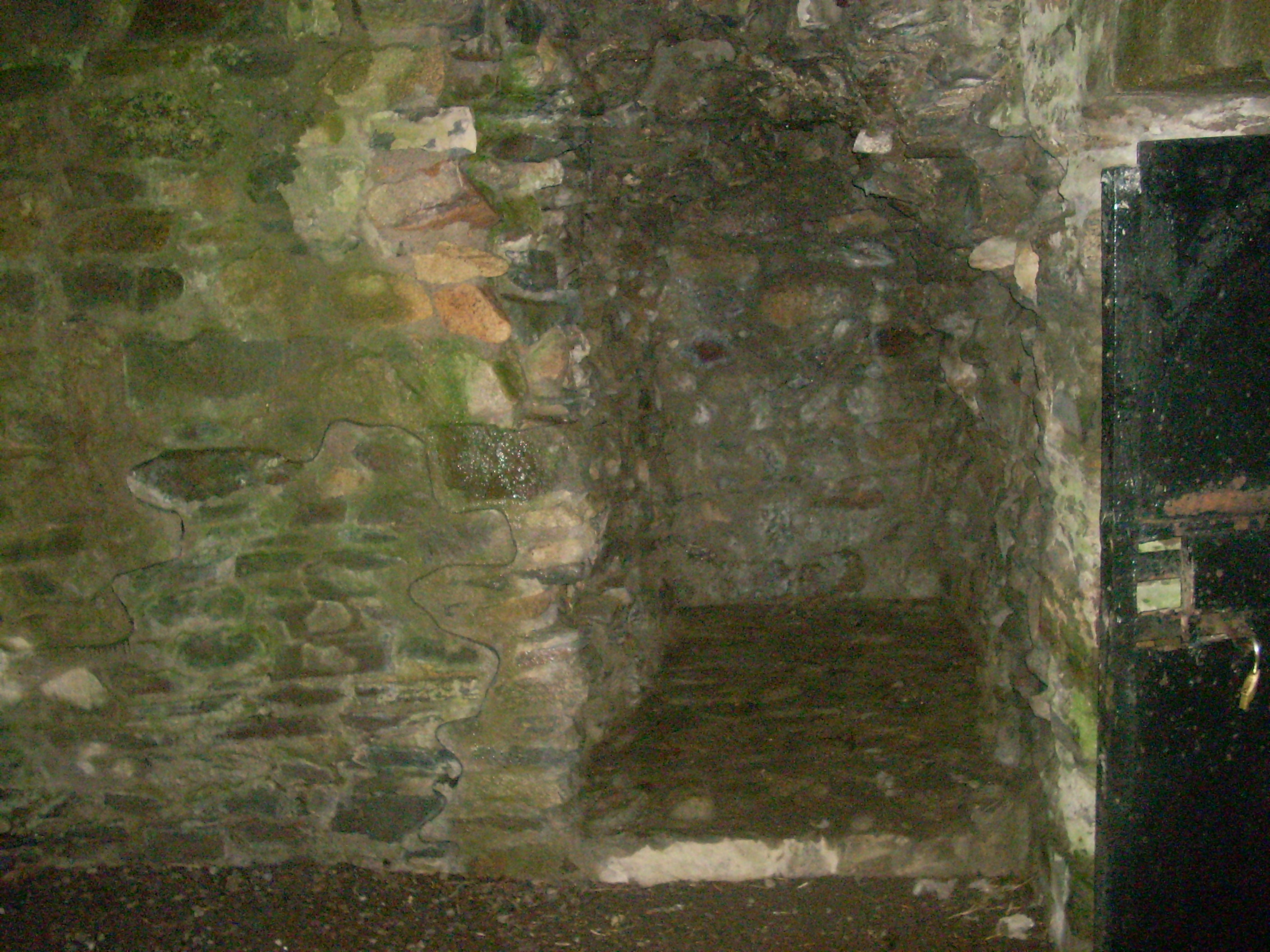
Interior of castle showing thickness of walls

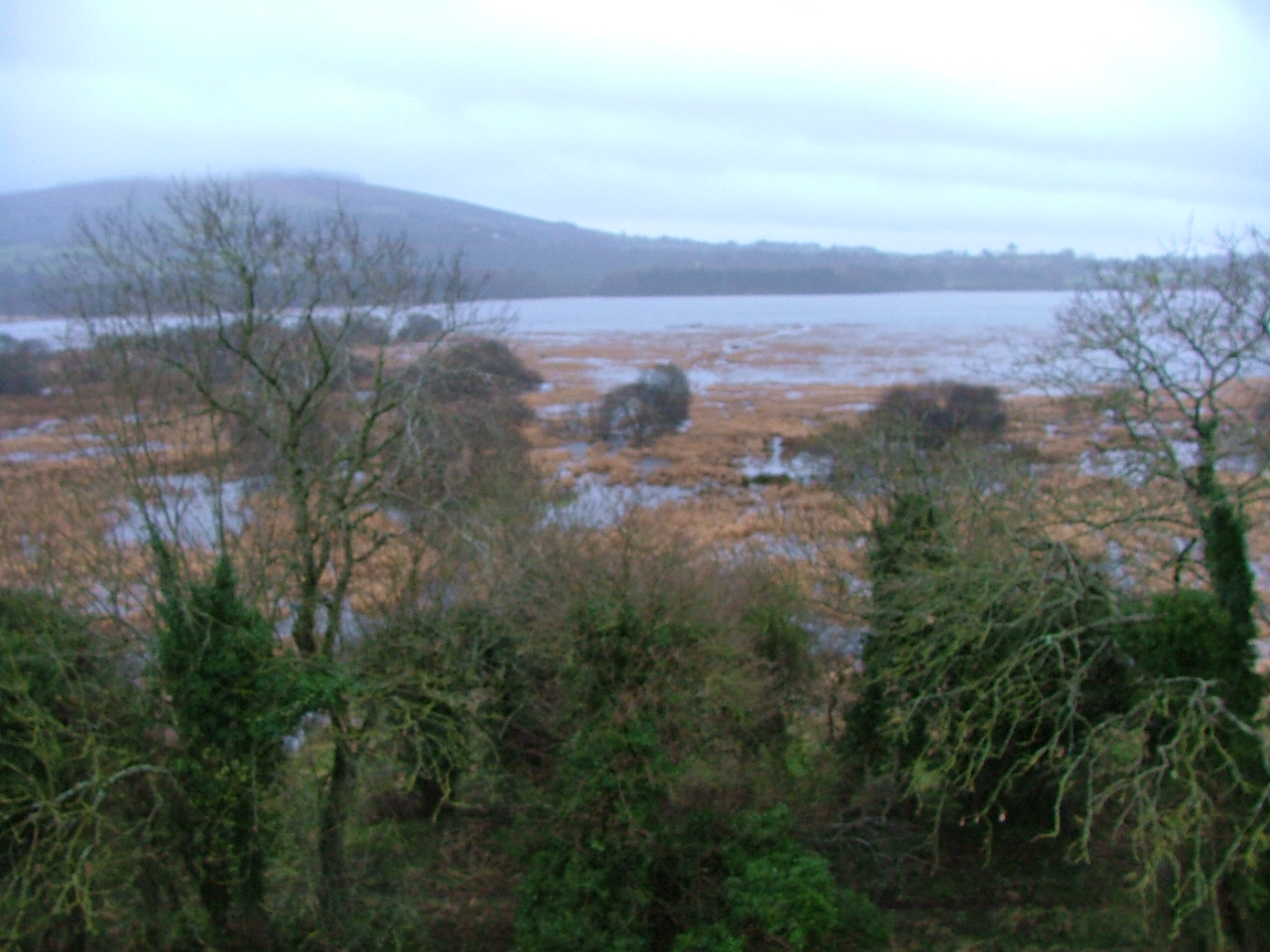
View towards Poulaphouca Reservoir aka Blessington Lake from the castle roof, December 2009

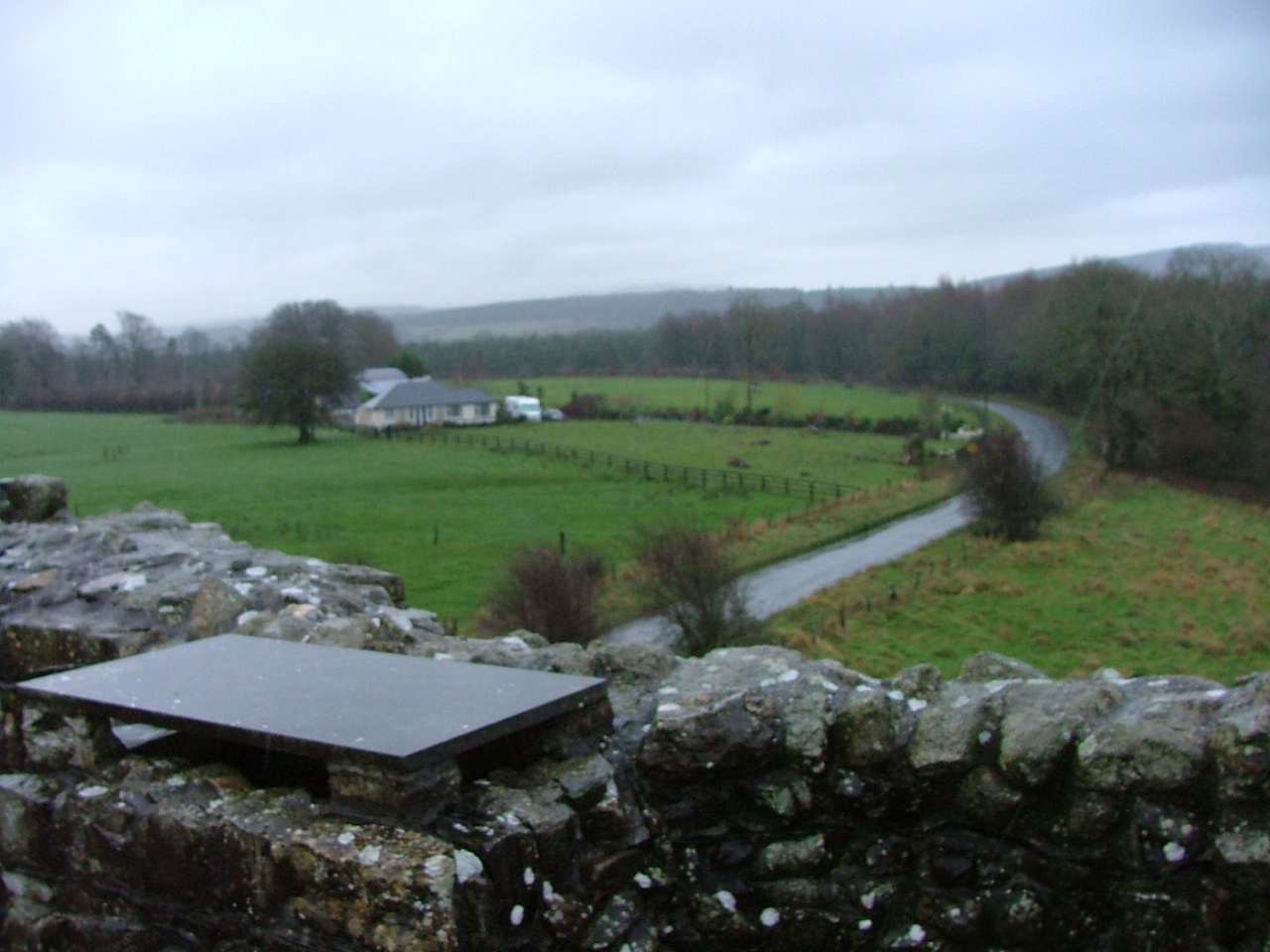
View towards the Manor Kilbride road (L4371) from the castle roof, December 2009

== See also ==
- Castles in Great Britain and Ireland
- List of castles in Ireland
