= Seefingan =

Mountain in Counties Dublin and Wicklow, Ireland

Coordinates: 53°11′31″N 6°22′30″W

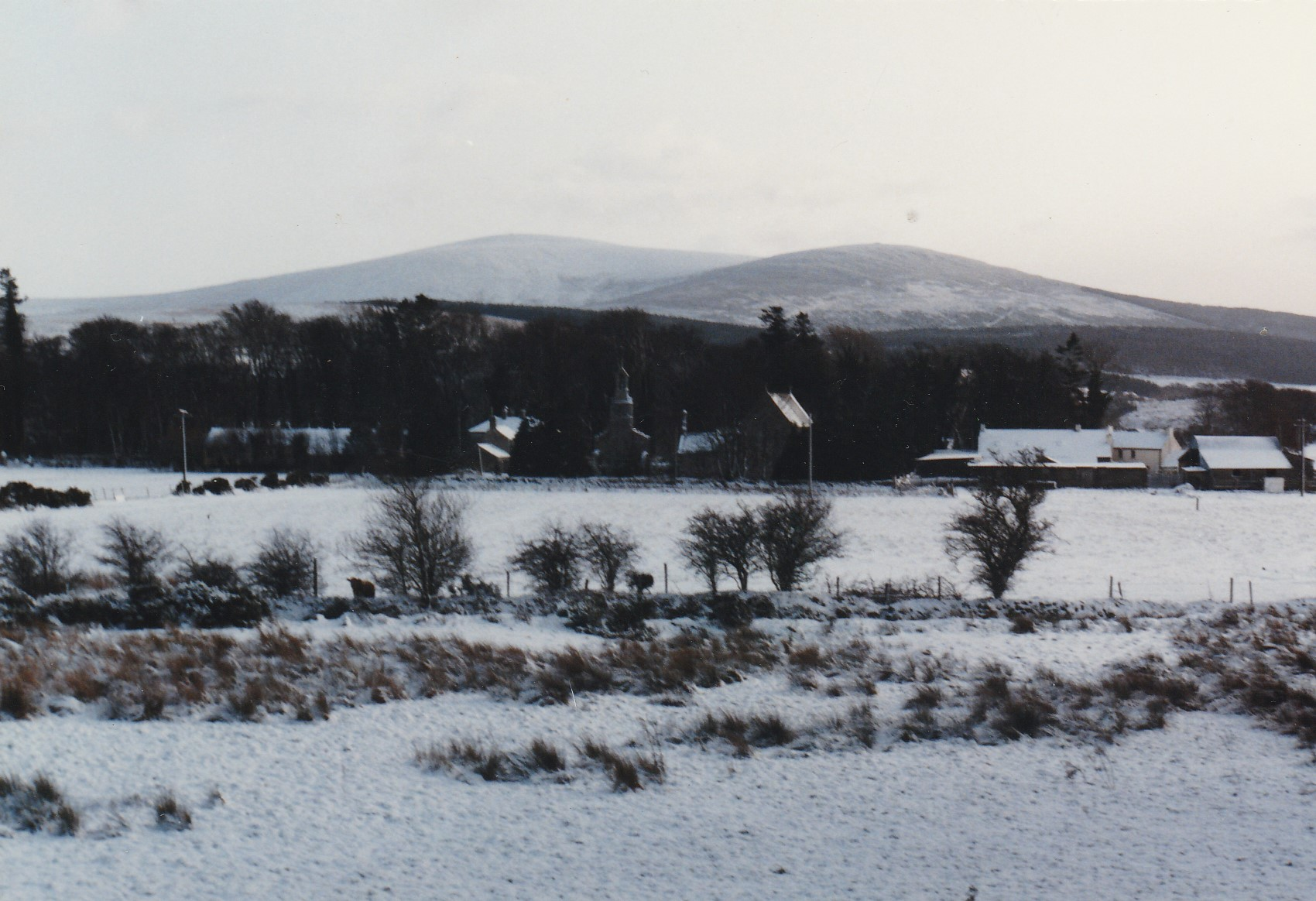
- Seefingan (left) and Seefin (right) as seen from Manor Kilbride

Highest point
- Elevation: 723 m (2,372 ft)
- Prominence: 99 m (325 ft)
- Parent peak: Kippure
- Listing: Hewitt

Naming
- Native name: Suí Fingain

Geography
- Location within island of Ireland
- Location: Counties Wicklow & Dublin, Ireland
- Parent range: Wicklow Mountains
- Topo map: OSi Discovery 56

Seefingan often spelt Seafingan (Irish: Suí Fingain meaning Fingan's Seat) is a mountain that straddles two county boundaries from its summit in Wicklow eastwards down into South Dublin, in Ireland. There are extensive views from the summit and there is a large megalithic cairn nearby.

== Geography ==
At 724 metres (2,375 ft) Seefingan is the 11th highest summit in the Wicklow Mountains, the second highest point in South Dublin after Kippure and the 92nd highest summit in Ireland. It stands at the junction of three ridges, Corrig to the north, Seefin to the southwest and Kippure to the east, and straddles the border between County Wicklow and South Dublin. The headwaters of the River Dodder lie on the eastern slopes of Seefingan, Kippure and Seecawn.

The summit is a smooth grassy area but the three ridges are boggy, and particularly difficult to negotiate after rain. There are footpaths but they can be difficult to follow through the boggy parts; a Seefin – Seefingan – Kippure circuit is one possible route. There is not a cairn on the summit, but there is a notice warning walkers of Kilbride Camp and the nearby military firing range. There are extensive views to the mountains of western Wicklow, Mullaghcleevaun and Poulaphouca Reservoir, the prominent communication masts on the top of Kippure and across the city of Dublin towards Howth. A few hundred yards west of the summit lies a large megalithic cairn, which probably marks the site of a collapsed passage tomb. There is also a trig point here.

== Archaeology ==
William Domville Handcock describes the top of Seefingan (or "See Finnan") in his The History and Antiquities of Tallaght in the County of Dublin from 1877:

Following the crest of the hill for about a mile or so, we arrive at See Finnan, a mountain considerably higher than Seeghane, and quite covered with bog and heath. There is a very large and perfect cairn on the top of it, which, like that at Seeghane, does not appear to have been opened. It may contain a chamber, like that on Seefin, which is about a mile further on, and is the loftiest hill of the three.

== See also ==
- List of mountains in Ireland

== Sources ==
- Domville Handcock, William (1877). The History and Antiquities of Tallaght in the County of Dublin (PDF). Dublin: Hodges, Figgis, & Co., Ltd., 104 Grafton Street.
- Dix, Ernest Reginald McClintock (31 December 1925). "Some Antiquities on Tallaght Hill". The Journal of the Royal Society of Antiquaries of Ireland. 15 (2). Royal Society of Antiquaries of Ireland: 126–129. JSTOR 25513370.
