= Seefin Passage Tomb =

Passage grave in County Wicklow, Ireland

- Tuama Pasáiste Shuí Finn (Irish)
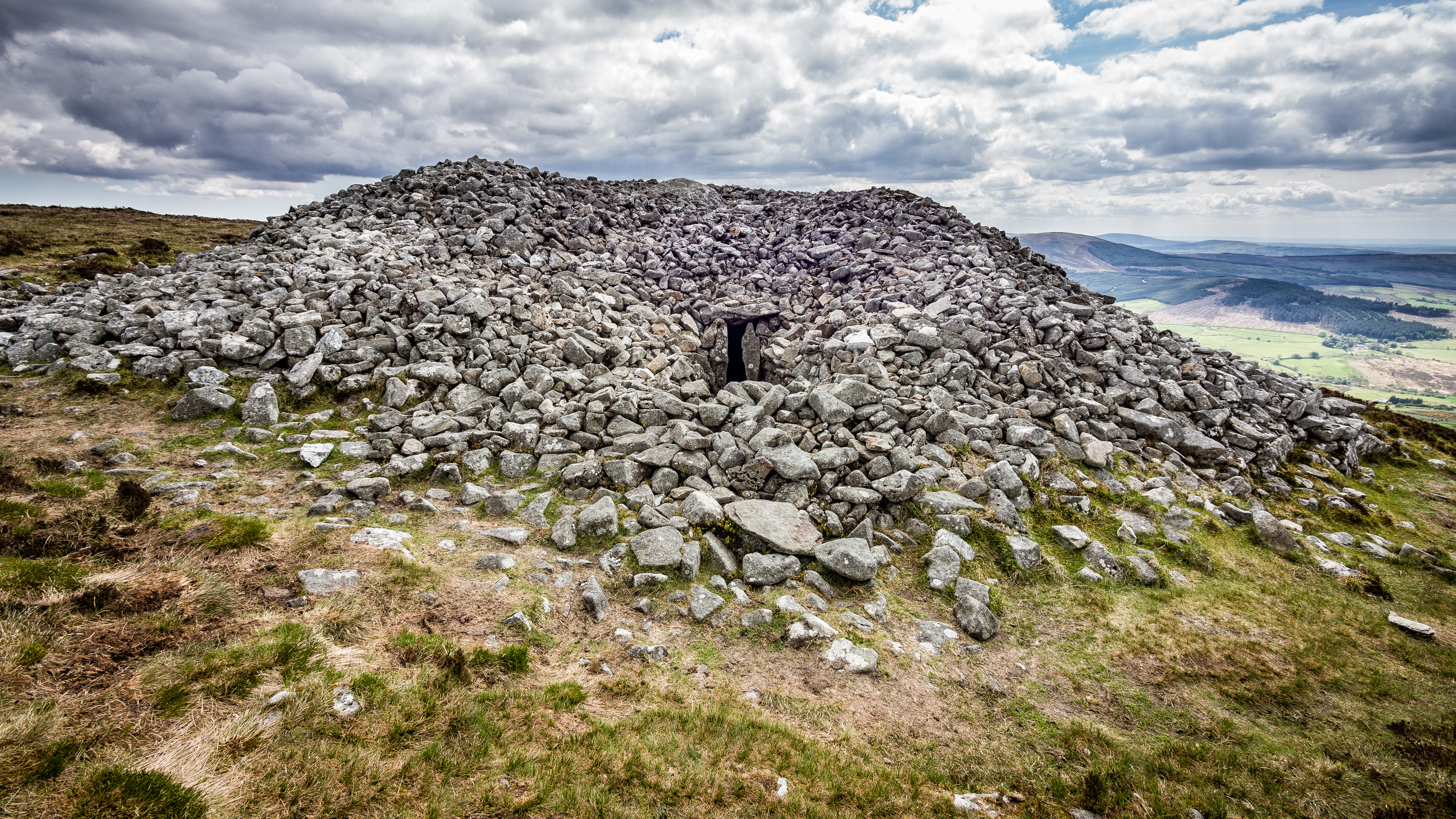
- The tomb in 2013

- Location within Ireland
- 53.186267°N 6.394809°W
- Type: Passage grave
- Location: Scurlocksleap, County Wicklow, Ireland

History
- Built: c. 3,300 BC

Site notes
- Elevation: 621 m (2,037 ft)
- Height: 3 m (9.8 ft)

National monument of Ireland
- Official name: Seefin
- Reference no.: 317

Seefin Passage Tomb (Irish:Tuama Pasáiste Shuí Finn) is an empty passage grave and National Monument located atop Seefin hill, County Wicklow, Ireland.

== Location ==
Seefin Passage Tomb is located atop Seefin in the Wicklow Mountains, just south of Kilbride Army Camp. Nearby Seefingan and Seahan mountains also have cairns atop them.

== History ==
The tomb was built around 3,300 BC, during Ireland's Neolithic. The academic Michael Fewer notes that in this area of County Wicklow, the peat cover began to develop about three to four millennia ago, and that the cairns on Seefin and Seefingan "can clearly be seen to have been built before this, on the original ground level at the base of the peat cover."

On the saddle between the two hills, pollen extracted from cores of the soil at the base of the peat indicated that a decline in elms and pines was followed by the appearance of plantain, evidence which indicates that tree clearance was followed by farming on the high land in Neolithic times, before the current bogs began to develop. The climate at that time was milder, and the thin soils at the heights on the mountains would have only allowed a sparse covering of forest, so the trees existing at that time would have been relatively easy to clear in order to create pastures, when compared with the lowlands at the base of the mountains, which "would have been covered with a thick, impenetrable, malarial swamp and wildwood." Fewer notes the existence of a water spring which exists "just below the summit of Seahan", which could have fulfilled the water needs of the community farming on the hilltop, and a further water source under the peat near the cairn on Seefin, which has been identified through water divining. According to Fewer, "it is probable that communities of Neolithic people lived on these mountaintops, their dwellings gathered around their burial monuments like a village around a church", similar to patterns common throughout hilly areas in southern Europe, where climatic conditions now are "probably similar to that what prevailed in Ireland nearly five millennia ago."

William Domville Handcock described the state of the tomb in 1877 as part of his The History and Antiquities of Tallaght in the County of Dublin:

A great cairn crowns (Seefin's) highest point, which is about 100 yards in circumference. There was a deep fosse all around it; then a circle of rocks placed edgeways, and inside smaller stones, piled up about twenty feet in height. In the centre is an opening, leading into a sepulchral chamber, about twelve feet in length, and roofed with flat stones, each projecting further than the other. The rocks of which the chamber is composed are of great size, and are rudely fitted together. The roof of the chamber has partly fallen in.

The tomb was excavated by R. A. Stewart Macalister in 1931, but no artefacts or human remains were found, suggesting that no-one was ever buried there, or that the remains were later removed. During the Macalister excavation, a pile of loose stones which had been blocking the original entrance passage were cleared out.

Rosaleen Dwyer, Heritage Officer of South Dublin County Council, explained in a 2015 talk the significance of the tomb complex spread across the Dublin and Wicklow Mountains, explaining:

When you're up there the views are just spectacular, you literally have a 360° view... you can see why our Neolithic ancestors chose the high point of these mountains to put their burial tombs. The tops of mountains are... they're the interface between land and the sky, and they're full of magic... and again, being such prominent locations, they were viewable from the lowlands so everybody knew exactly who they were looking at up there and why they were buried there and how important they were. And these tombs across the Dublin Mountains in particular, all form one massive cemetery, which is widely spaced out, but when you're at the top of one of those mountains you can see the cairns and the tombs on top of the other ones... it's a magnificent cemetery landscape.

== Description ==
The tomb is a stone cairn, 24 m (79 ft) in diameter and 3 m (9.8 ft) high. There are two stones at the entrance with concentric diamond shapes cut into them. There are large kerb stones around the base of the tomb and the tomb has a passageway 7 m (23 ft) long, which opens into a chamber with five recesses. There are some carved decorations in lozenge shape, carved lines and quartz.

== Gallery ==
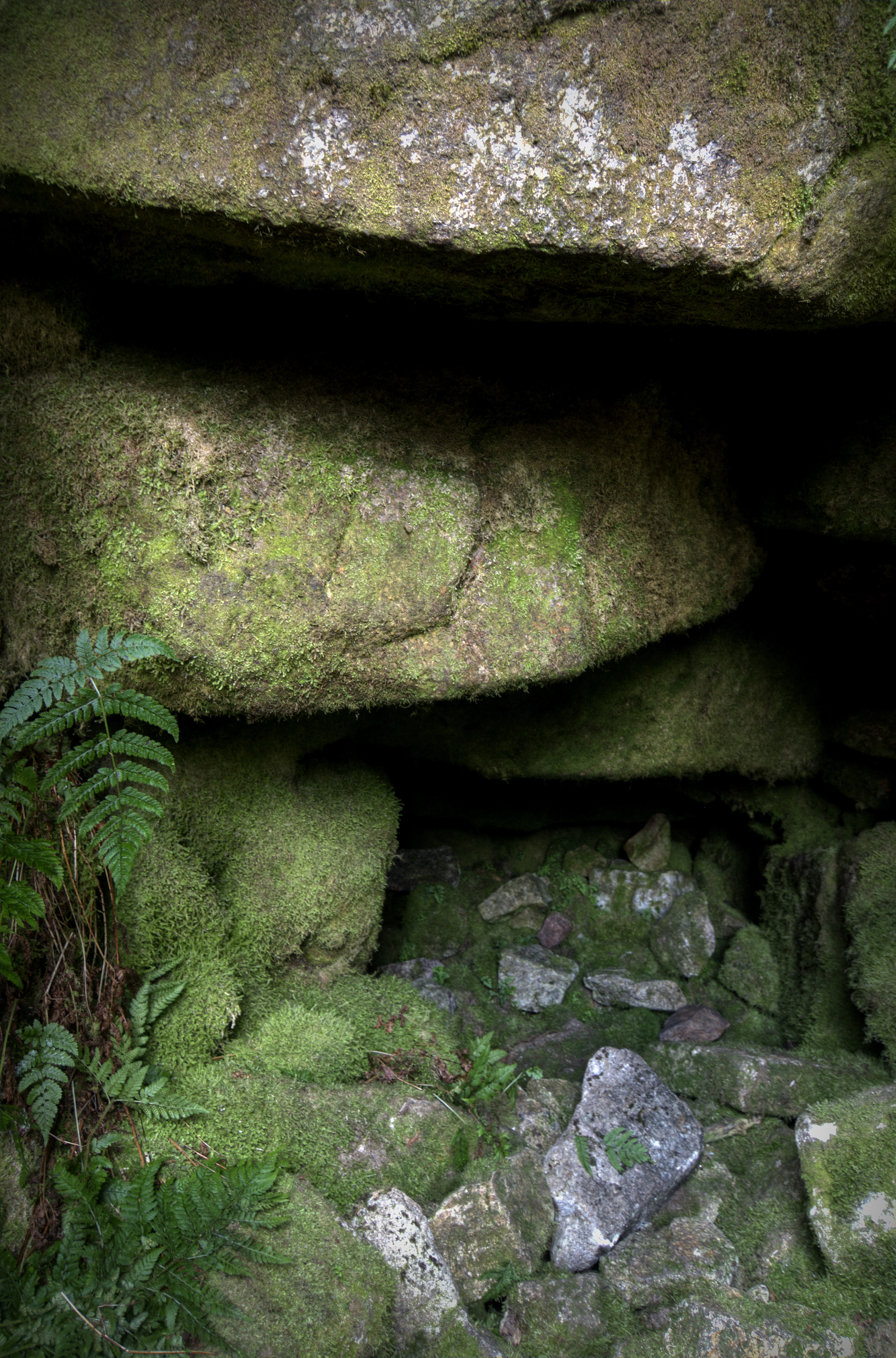
Carved cross inside Seefin tomb

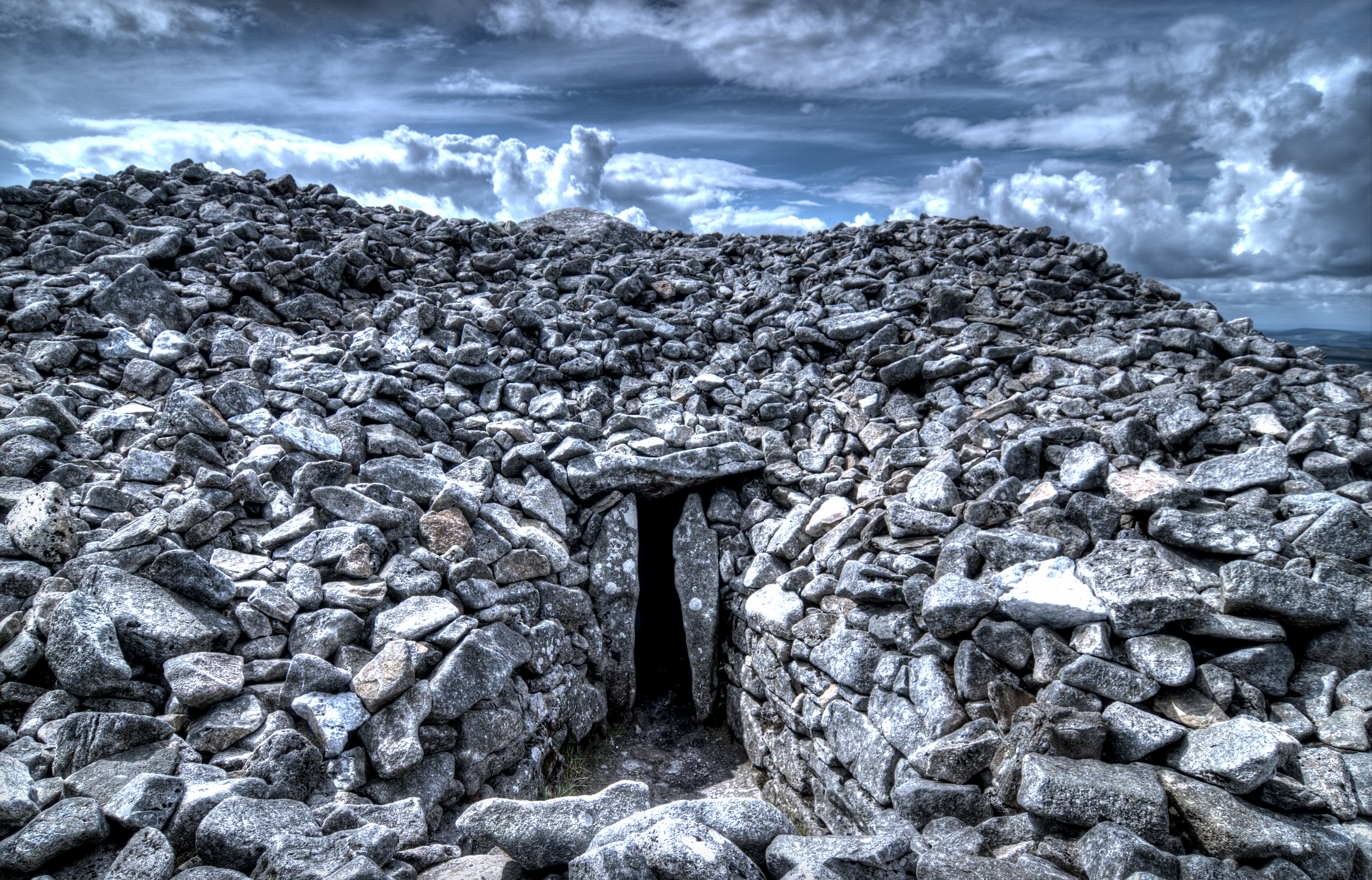
Entrance doorway

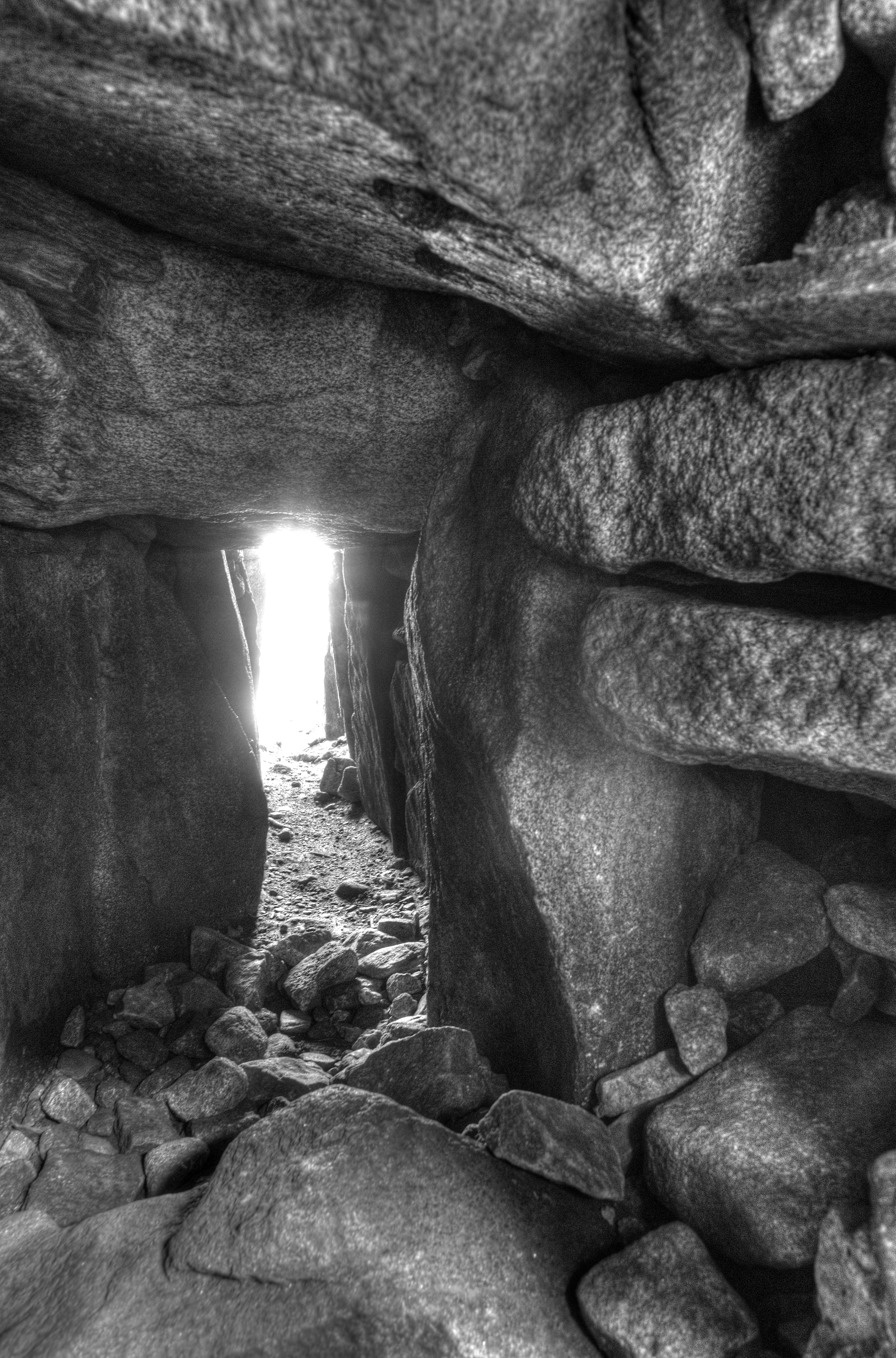
View from chamber looking outward

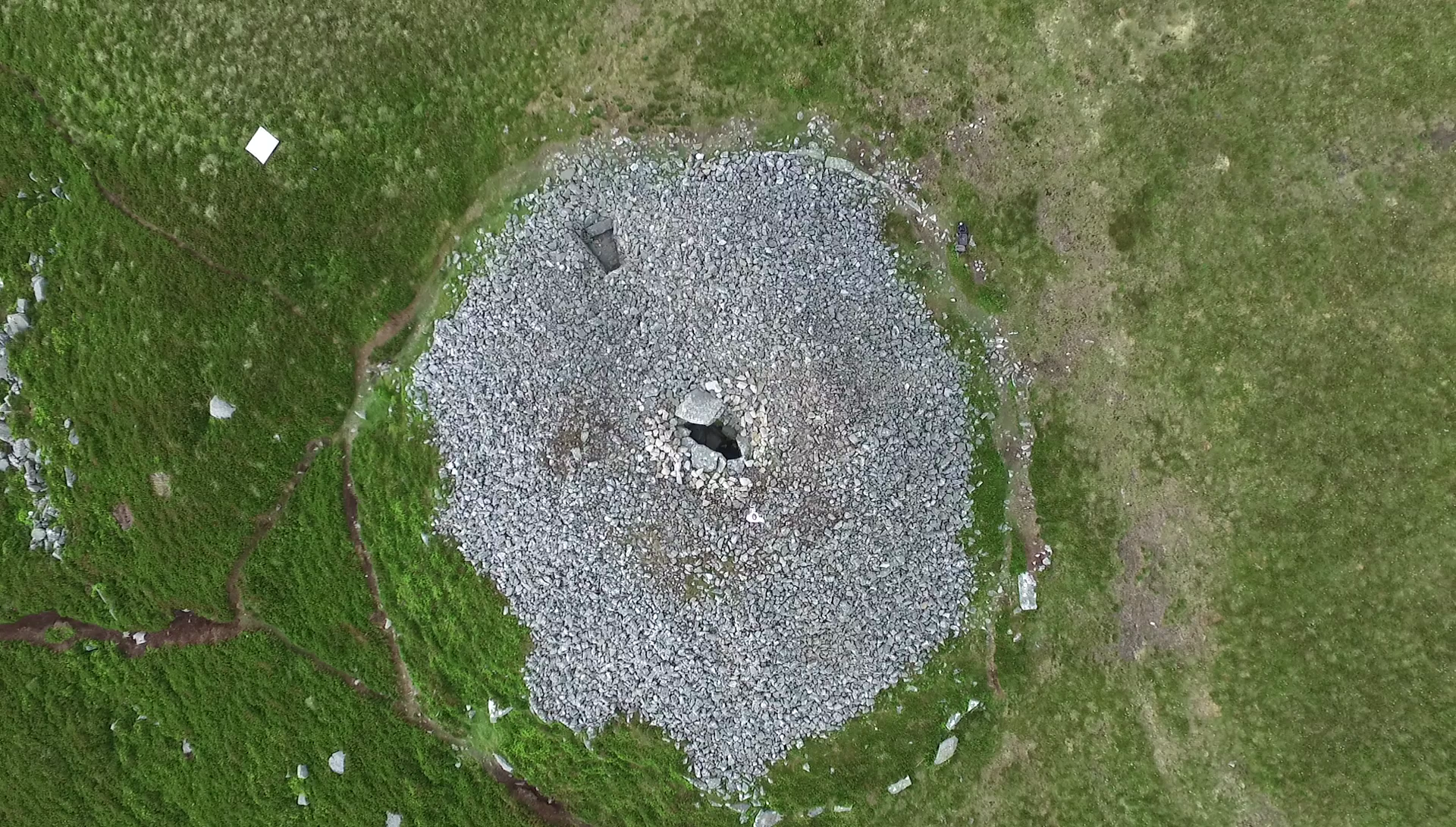
View from above

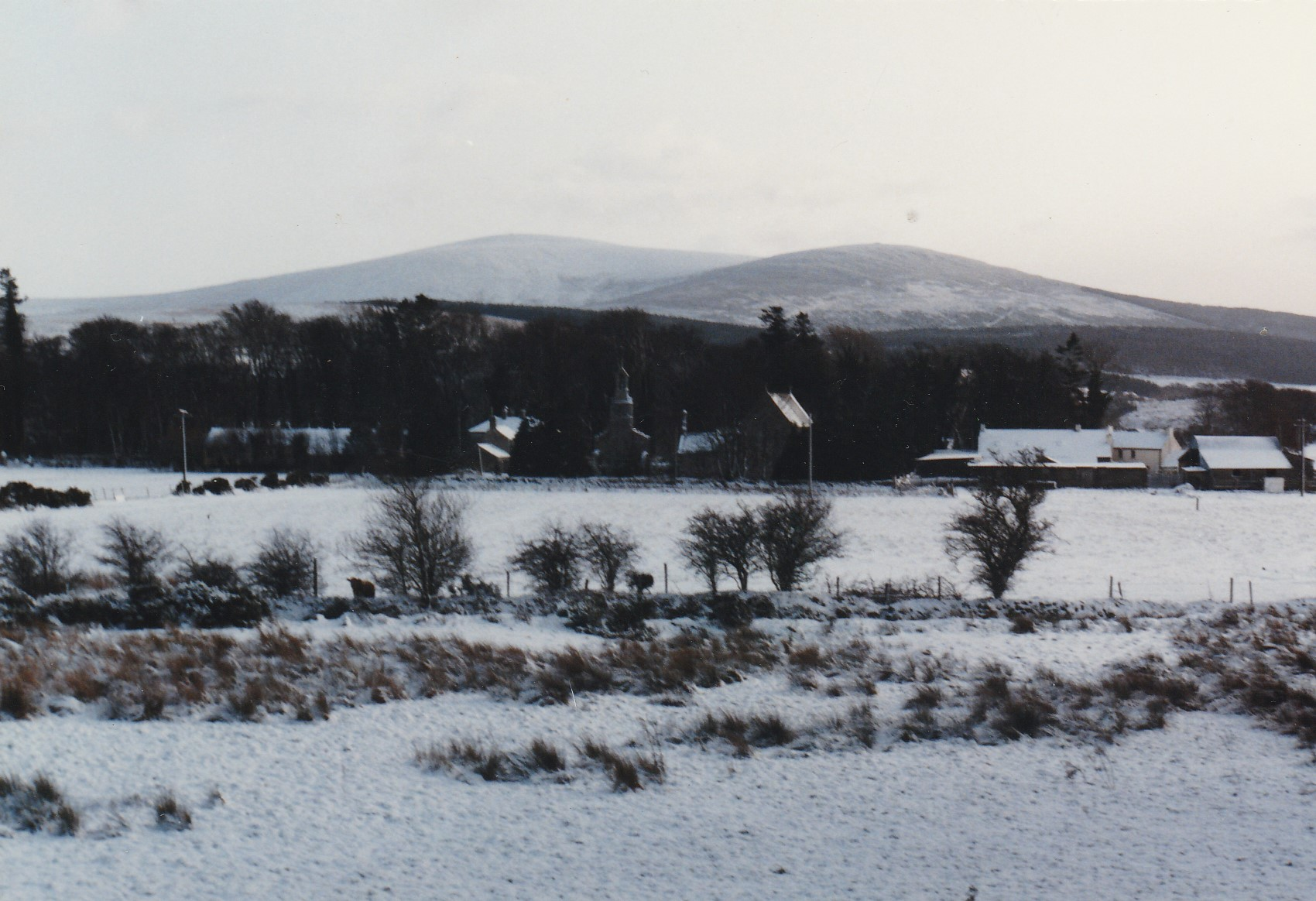
The tomb is visible from afar on the summit, as is its sister cairn on Seefingan

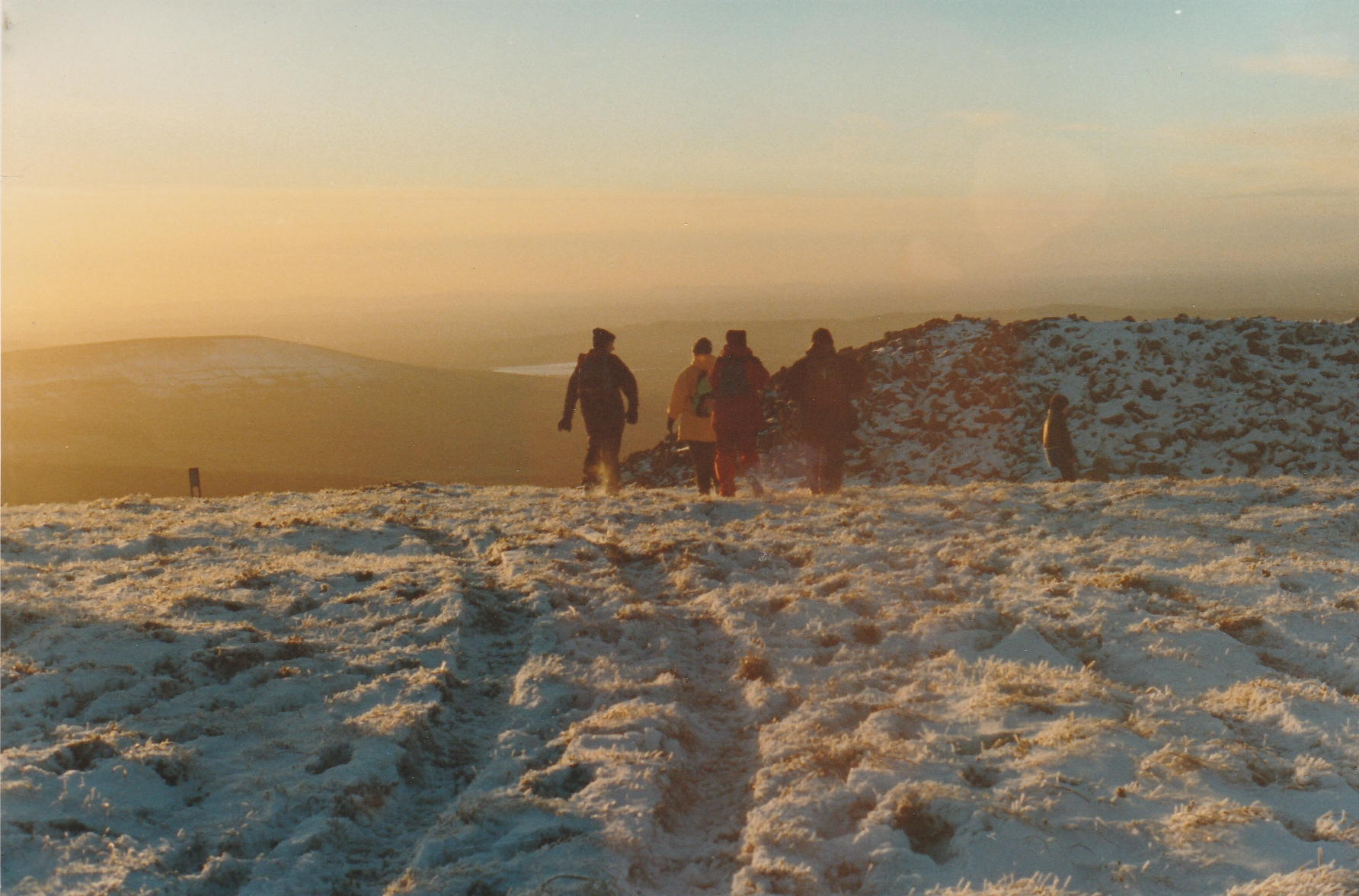
Hillwalkers approaching the tomb, midwinter 1998

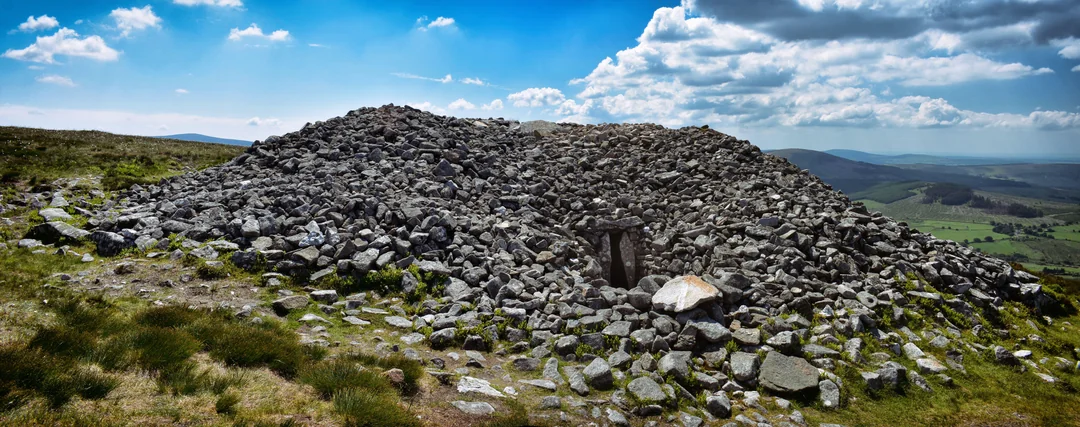
The tomb on a clear day

== Sources ==
- Domville Handcock, William (1877). The History and Antiquities of Tallaght in the County of Dublin (PDF). Dublin: Hodges, Figgis, & Co., Ltd., 104 Grafton Street.
- Dix, Ernest Reginald McClintock (31 December 1925). "Some Antiquities on Tallaght Hill". The Journal of the Royal Society of Antiquaries of Ireland. 15 (2). Royal Society of Antiquaries of Ireland: 126–129. JSTOR 25513370.
- Fewer, Michael (2007). The Wicklow Military Road: History and Topography. Dublin: Ashfield Press. ISBN 978-1-901658-66-8.
- Quinn, Peter (2015). Bohernabreena. Dublin: The History Press Ireland. ISBN 978-1-84588-887-9.
