= Kilbride, County Wicklow =

Village in County Wicklow, Ireland

Manor Kilbride Cill Bhríde (Irish)
- Village
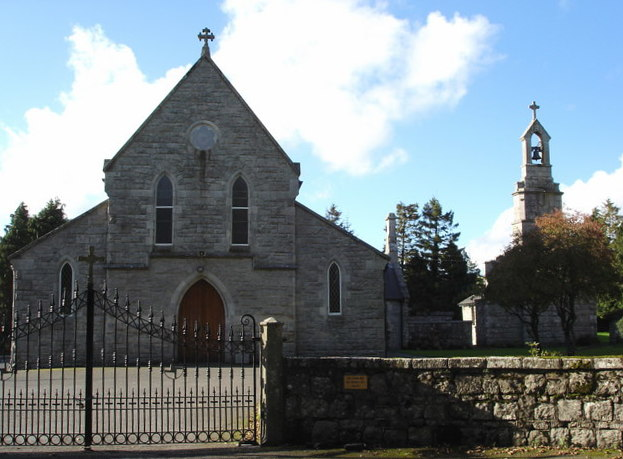
- Manor Kilbride parish church

- Location within Ireland
- Coordinates: 53°11′53″N 6°28′01″W
- Country: Ireland
- Province: Leinster
- County: County Wicklow

Area
  - Total: 46.9112 km^{2} (18.1125 sq mi)

Population (2011)
  - Total: 975
  - Density: 20.8/km^{2} (53.8/sq mi)

Historical population
Year	Pop.	±%
1841	1,324	—
1851	897	−32.3%
1881	1,063	+18.5%
1926	537	−49.5%
1961	532	−0.9%
2011	975	+83.3%

Kilbride (Irish: Cill Bhríde), or Manor Kilbride, is a village, civil parish and electoral division in County Wicklow, Ireland, located at the western edge of the Wicklow Mountains in the barony of Talbotstown Lower.

== Geography ==
Manor Kilbride village is situated in the eponymous townland at the center of the civil parish, occupying a valley formed by the convergence of the Brittas River and the River Liffey, north of Poulaphouca Reservoir. The valley is bounded by Goldenhill, Cromwellstownhill and Cupidstown Hill to the west with Butterhill and Ballyfoyle to the east. The civil parish covers 11,591 statute acres, containing the following townlands:

Townland	Acreage	Irish name	Earliest record of placename or variant
Aghfarrell	12	Áth Fhearaíl	1578 - Agherillin 1605 - Aghferylin
Athdown	1089	Áth Dúin	1530 - Downisfford, Downysforde 1655 - Addoone
Ballyfolan	848	Baile Uí Fhaoláin	1700 - Ballyfolane*
Ballyfoyle	433	Baile an Phuill*	1618 - Ballinfrill
Brittas	245	An Briotás	1228 - Bretaschia 1278 - Britach 1260 - Bretag' in le Cowlagh
Butter Mountain	935	Sliabh an Bhóthair	1655 - Butter Mountaine
Carrignagower	205	Carraig na (n)Gabhar*	1760 - Carrignagower
Cloghleagh	700	Clochóg*	1618 - Inchecloghfea 1655 - Cloghoge
Goldenhill	181	Gualann*	1760 - Golden-Hill
Kilbride	938	Cill Bhríde	1225 - villa Gillebride Ogadereur 1250 - Killbride
Kippure	1450	Cipiúr	1604 - Kippoore
Knockatillane	579	Cnoc a' tSeithleáin/Cnoc an tSaileáin*	1700 - Knockatalane*
Knockbane	103	Cnoc Bán*	-
Lisheens	373	Na Lisíní	1700 - the Lesseens*
Moanaspick	282	Móin Easpaig	-
Scurlocksleap	630	Léim an Scorlógaigh	1655 - Scurlocksleape
Shankill	1338	An tSeanchill	1663 - Sankell
Tinode	1250	Tigh Nód *	1248 - Tachewaur (?) 1540 - Tenaud *

Seefingan (723m) and Seefin (621m) mountains, as seen from Manor Kilbride

Much of the parish consists of mountain and blanket bog; the boundaries are formed by the southwest–northeast ridge of Cromwellstownhill and Cupidstown Hill to the west, the Brittas River to the north, the peaks of Seefin (621m), Seefingan (723m) and Kippure (757m) to the northeast, the River Liffey to the southeast and a small stream to southwest. The parish borders counties Kildare and Dublin to the west and north and the Wicklow parishes of Blessington and Calary to the south and east. The N81 road from Dublin to Baltinglass runs southwest through a valley between Cromwellstownhill and Goldenhill, across Moanaspick and Tinode. The R759 road, one of two routes crossing the Wicklow Mountains, runs southeast above the Liffey through Manor Kilbride, Knockatillane, Cloghleagh, Scurlocksleap, Athdown and Kippure.

== History ==
=== Prehistory ===
A cluster of four cairns of Neolithic or Bronze Age origin and a ringfort are located atop Golden Hill west of the village. Two enclosures of prehistoric or early medieval date, and four cairns of Neolithic or Bronze Age date are situated atop the Dowry Hill in Kilbride townland. A pit-burial of likely Bronze Age date was excavated in Kilbride townland. Six cairns of likely prehistoric date are located in the eastern half of Cloghleagh and two are located in Ballyfolan. Passage graves are located atop both Seefin and Seefingan. (see: Seefin Passage Tomb) All are listed in the Record of Monuments and Places. A polished stone axehead was recovered from the townland of Knockatillane in 1866.

=== Early medieval ===
Liam Price speculated that the townland and parish name originated from an Early Christian church, located in the townland of Shankill (An tSeanchill - the old church) under the jurisdiction of St. Bridget's Monastery of Kildare. Ringforts of likely early medieval date are located atop Golden Hill, below Cloghleagh Church, and adjacent to the deserted settlement at Lisheens. A perforated stone, found at an earthen fort, adjoining Kilbride Parish Church presented to the Royal Irish Academy in 1866, may have been a quern stone, presumably from the ringfort below Cloghleagh Church. While there are no visible medieval remains in Kilbride village, the townland of Lisheens contains the site of an early medieval watermill.

=== Anglo-Norman settlement ===
The medieval history of the area is obscure. West Wicklow was densely forested in the medieval period, with the barony of Talbotstown described as Coillacht in the 12th century and the church of Kilbride described as Kylbryde in the Colach in 1291, when the area formed part of the estates of the Archbishop of Dublin. Despite later references to the manor and lordship of Kilbride, it is unclear if the townland or parish contained a manorial centre; a likely site would be close to the graveyard or in the grounds of Kilbride Manor, but no evidence has been identified.

==== Kilbride church ====
Price speculated that the graveyard was the site of an Anglo-Norman parish church founded before 1250 and it is listed as a church site in the Record of Monuments and Places. The Catholic church contains a font reputedly from the earlier church. An early medieval cross-slab from the graveyard was presented to the National Museum of Ireland in 1970. In 1630, the impropriations of Kilteel and Kilbride churches were held by the Alen family of St. Wolstan's and the church and chauncels were described as "very ruinous". Foundations of a building, possibly the original church, were identified during the excavation of a grave in the 20th century. A 2009 survey recorded the earliest legible gravestones, from the first decades of the 18th century, clustered around a raised area at the graveyard's centre, possibly the site of the church.

==== Athdown ====
Athdown contains the site of a church and graveyard and the site of a possible Anglo-Norman motte; the latter site, removed by quarrying, presumably controlled the fording point across the River Liffey to the southwest, marked on the OS maps. The church and motte site were connected by a lane, also visible on the OS maps. Liam Price speculated the church was the 'Ecclesia de Villa Reysin' noted in the 13th century extent Crede Mihi. Scurlocksleap, an adjacent townland, may preserve the name of an Anglo-Norman landowner.

==== Ballyfolan ====
A possible deserted medieval settlement, two hut sites and three enclosures of uncertain date are located in Ballyfolan.

==== Brittas ====
The name Brittas suggests a bretasche, an earth and timber fortification from the first phase of Norman settlement, though such a site is more likely to have been located in the adjoining townland of the same name in the parish of Tallaght.

=== Later medieval ===
In 1318, the 2nd Earl of Kildare granted the church of Rathmore and its subordinate chapels, with Kilbride and the church of Villa Reysin to the prior of the Hospitaller Preceptory of Kilmainham. The churches of Rathmore and Kilbride and the lordship of Kilbride were held by the Preceptory of Kilteel at the time of its dissolution. The uplands of County Wicklow were a land of war in the later medieval period, beyond the boundaries of the English Pale defined by the fortified settlements at Rathmore and Kilteel to the west, disputed between the Gaelic O'Toole and O'Byrne families who held the Wicklow uplands and the settled communities of the lowlands. The Alen family of St. Wolstans held a lease of the preceptory and its possessions from at least 1539; a lease of the preceptory dated 12 July 1539 describes Thomas Alen as of Kilheele. The preceptory's possessions included the "Lordship of Kilbride". The status of the area as a marchland is noted in an early grant:

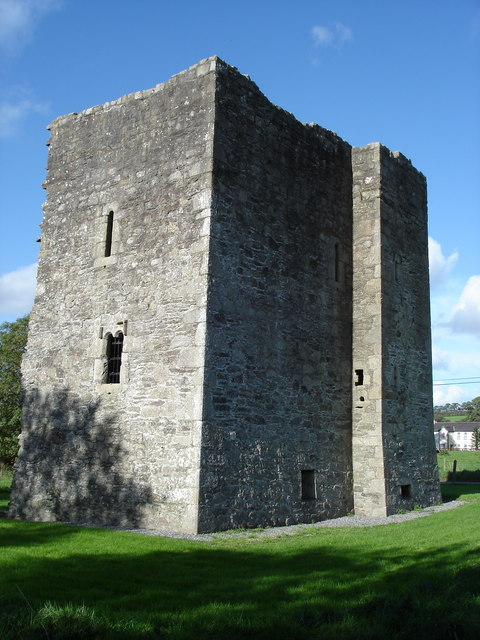
Threecastles Castle near Kilbride, Co Wicklow

"in consideration that the Preceptory, lordship or manor of Kilheale, in Kildare county, is situated in the marches thereof near the Irish enemies, the Tholes (O'Tooles), where resistance and defence are required, grant to Thomas Alan and Mary his wife, the said lordship."

Large areas of west Wicklow nominally held by the Earls of Ormond were occupied by the O'Tooles in the 15th century. The 8th Earl of Kildare, who held the adjacent manor of Rathmore, claimed these lands using a statute of 1482 allowing occupation of uninhabited lands. A tower house at Threecastles in Blessington parish, three kilometres west of Kilbride, controlling a fording point across the River Liffey, may have been built by the Earl before his death in 1513 to protect the territory against the O'Tooles. In 1524, the 8th Earl of Ormond seized Threecastles and installed a garrison in response to the Fitzgeralds' murder of Sir Robert Talbot. In 1538, a force under John Kelway, Constable of Rathmore, was ambushed and slain at Threecastles by a force under Turlough O'Toole. Turlough's son, Brian O'Toole of Powerscourt, sheriff of Dublin, defeated an alliance between FitzGerald rebels and the O'Tooles of Imaal at Threecastles in 1547. The Annals of the Four Masters describes the battle:

The rebel[s] Fitzgeralds sustained a great defeat at Baile-na-dtri-gCaislen from the English, and from Brian-an-chogaidh, the son of Turlough O'Toole, in which the two sons of James, son of the Earl, namely, Maurice-an-fheadha and Henry, with fourteen of their people, were taken prisoners. They were afterwards conveyed to Dublin, and all cut into quarters, excepting Maurice, who was imprisoned in the King's castle, until it should be determined what death he should receive. Thus were these plunderers and rebels dispersed and scared; and although their career was but of short duration (one year only), they committed vast depredations.

An entry in Friar Clyn's Annals of Ireland suggests Kilbride was one of a number of settlements on the borders of the Pale raided and burnt by Rory O'More in 1577.

==== Lisheens ====
Lisheens townland, 2 km north of Kilbride village, contains a deserted settlement of medieval or early modern date, close to two circular enclosures, a ringfort and a cross-inscribed stone. The ringfort suggests the settlement may have originated in the early medieval period. The cross-inscribed stone may be a Mass rock dating from the era of the Penal Laws. The field system associated with the settlement is distinct from that depicted on the 1838 Ordnance Survey maps, suggesting it was abandoned before 1800. A second deserted settlement of possible medieval date lies northeast of Cloghleagh bridge.

=== Early modern ===
The Down Survey for Kilbride and Blessington parishes, completed c. 1655, records no buildings in Kilbride parish, but Threecastles is listed as containing a garrison, presumably there to secure the area following the Cromwellian Conquest of Ireland. Despite the nominal conclusion of the conflict in 1653, Wicklow continued to serve as a refuge for the remnants of the Confederate forces or Rapparees. The Cromwellian regime excluded the county from military protection, proclaimed it a free-fire zone and sought to remove the Catholic Old English and Gaelic Irish population.

The Allen family lost lands under the Interrugnum but successfully petitioned for their return. Patrick Allen obtained a grant of Kilbride and other lands in Wicklow and Kildare in 1685. In 1702 Francis Allen of St. Wolstans leased the Manor and Lordship of Kilbride, coterminous with the civil parish, to Henry Fitzpatrick of Friarstown for a term of 299 years. The leasehold interest changed ownership several times before its purchase in 1796 by George Ponsonby, later Lord Chancellor.

In 1766, Robert Green, vicar of Rathmore, Kilteel and Kilbride recorded three Protestant families and 85 Roman Catholic families within the parish of Kilbride.

=== Nineteenth and twentieth centuries ===
==== Kilbride village ====
In 1821 the population of Kilbride parish was estimated at 1,049 people, with 165 families inhabiting 154 houses. The Ordnance Survey Name Books describe Kilbride in 1838:

In the Parish and Townland of Kilbride about three miles North of Blessington. It is a very small village, with a neat Roman Catholick Chapel, and two publick houses.

Between 1841 and 1851 the population of the parish declined from 1324 to 897, and the number of inhabited houses declined from 188 to 125.

==== RIC stations ====
A Royal Irish Constabulary station marked south of the chapel on the 1853 Primary Valuations had passed out of use before 1900, but may be incorporated within an existing dwelling. In 1827 the police station had one constable and three sub-constables. A second station recorded in Kippure in 1834 and depicted on the 1838 OS map had two sub-constables in 1877. A third station in Tinode, marked in 1838, had passed out of use by 1843, when recorded in the Valuation House Books.

==== Schools ====
A National school adjacent to the first station on the 1853 Valuations map had passed out of use before 1900, replaced by a new building in Knockatillane built by the Moore family. In 1868 the latter school had 94 pupils. The original national school may be incorporated within an existing private dwelling.

The Third Edition OS maps marks a smithy south of the graveyard, also recorded in the 1901 Census; no traces survive.

==== Public houses ====
A small public house described in the 1901 Census, then occupied by Mary Lalor, was possibly one of those noted in 1838. It survives in extended form as Mooney's Public House. The Kildare Observer described it in 1904:

At the corner of the Manor demesne stands Lalor's Inn, a[n] hostelry where the traveller will find every comfort and accommodation to strengthen him for his tour, which properly only commences there.

In April 1923, During the Irish Civil War Free State troops arrived at Mooney's Public House in search of John Moore, a former British Army soldier and a member of an Irregular flying column operating in the area. Moore fled from the back of the house, but was shot and killed before he could reach cover.

==== Mill ====
A corn mill depicted in 1838 at the south end of the village and recorded in the 1853 Valuations, lies under or within a later dwelling. The millrace survives as a field boundary to the west of the village.

=== Principal houses ===
==== Talbotstown House ====
While no building is marked in Kilbride townland on Jacob Neville's 1760 map, houses are depicted at Tinode and Aghfarrell. The National Inventory of Architectural Heritage dates Talbotstown House in Buttermountain to c. 1750, suggesting it is the building Neville marked as Aghfarrell House and the earliest surviving building in the parish. However the 1838 Ordnance Survey map depicts the ruins of Aghfarrell House north of Talbotstown House in Aghfarrell townland. The Record of Protected Structures for County Wicklow dates Talbotstown House to the early 19th century. Taylor and Skinner's 1777 map marks Aghfarrell as the residence of Allen Esq.

==== Kilbride Manor ====
In 1824 the Kilbride estate was purchased from George Ponsonby's widow by George Ogle Moore, barrister, MP for Dublin from 1826 to 1831 and Registrar of Deeds until 1846. Moore, described by James Ambercromby as an orange lawyer of doubtful fame and by Richard Lalor Sheil as Sir Forcible Feeble, was an aggressive defender of the Protestant interest in Parliament, mocked by his opponents for his intemperate opposition to Catholic Emancipation.

The current 'Manor' house, designed by Thomas Cobden in Tudor Revival style, was under construction when the Valuation House Books were being compiled in 1843. It replaced or incorporated an earlier building, Kilbride House depicted on the 1838 OS maps, possibly built before 1800. George Moore was living in Kilbride Manor in 1844, when James Frazer noted a new mansion and other improvements are in progress.

After Moore's death in 1847 his property passed to his son, the Reverend William Ogle Moore, the curate of Blessington and Kilbride parishes, whose financial difficulties are described in the diaries of Elizabeth Smith. In March 1853 she noted:

Ogle Moore has completed the preliminaries of his sale. A few weeks now will see him an independent man. All debts paid, his little income clear, and twenty thousand pounds to leave among his six daughters. He will educate and start his sons and they must make their own way.

Moore's Estate Act 1853 allowed Elizabeth Brown and her husband Joseph Scott Moore to purchase the Kilbride estate. In 1876, Joseph Scott Moore held 8,730 acres in Wicklow. Upon his death in 1884 he was succeeded by his son Joseph Fletcher Moore, whose son, Colonel Joseph Scott Moore, died at Kilbride in 1950. All three served as justices of the peace and High Sheriff of Wicklow.

==== Kippure ====
Located in a wooded demesne on the Sally Gap Road, a substantial farmhouse was present from the late 18th century. The house and lands were advertised for lease in the "Dublin Evening Post" in 1778:

The Well Known lands of KIPPURE, in the County of Wicklow, Nine Miles from Dublin; where there is excellent turf, and good Water for Bleaching; a proper place for carrying the Linen Manufacture; good Grazing-Ground, and very improveable, having plenty of Marly-Gravel, and other Gravel, and within a few Miles of Lime-Kilns, where good Corn, Hemp, Rye, Flax and Turnips, may be raised in great Plenty, at an easy Expense; and great Sallow Plantations, commonly called Ossieries, may be raised, which would produce great annual Profit to Tenants. There is a good Farm-House, Bullock-House for 20 Head of Cattle, a Stable for 10 Horses, and other Out-Offices, all slated and in excellent Repair; a good place for Dairies; in a fine Sporting Country; and leading to which there are fine Roads, lately made from Dublin, Wicklow, Blessington and Naas.

The Liffey near Manor Kilbride

First described as Kippure House or Kippure Park in the 19th century, it served as George Moore's residence from before 1827 until he occupied Kilbride Manor. In 1842 the house was listed as the seat of William Jones Armstrong. In 1851 Armstrong let Kippure to a "Northumbrian sheep farmer". The lease of the 1500 acre farm with gentlemanly residence and offices} was advertised in 1873. By 1891 it was occupied by John Henry Leech. Leech died in 1900 and in 1901 the house and farm were purchased by Alfred Darley for £2050, serving as his summer residence. The house was occupied by Anti-Treaty forces in January 1923 during the Irish Civil War and burnt by the same force on 13 February 1923. The Darley family sold the estate to its current owners in 1978.

==== Glen Heste ====
Kilbride Lodge or Kilbride Cottage, marked a short distance north of the village in 1838, may have been built by the Tassie family, who held the lease of the adjacent quarry up to 1796, or their successors the Doyles. In 1838 and 1844 the house was listed as William Ogle Moore's residence. The house was subsequently replaced or enlarged and renamed Glen Heste. In the twentieth century Glen Heste served as a hotel until it was destroyed by fire on 6 May 1958.

==== Tinode House ====
Tinode House is close to the site of a coaching inn, Horseshoe House, depicted in the 1838 OS maps, and described in the 1838 Ordnance Survey Name books, presumably the building marked in 1760 :

In the Townland of Tinode on the West side of the Old Dublin road. It is a fine house, slated and well-sheltered with trees, occupied by Mr. Coogan & was formerly a fine Inn; on the old road from Blessington to Dublin.

A branch of the Cogan family was resident in Tinode from at least 1764. William Henry Ford Cogan, Justice of the Peace, Whig MP for Kildare from 1852 until 1880 and High Sheriff of Wicklow in 1863, built Tinode House in 1864, demolishing the earlier buildings. The house was designed by William Caldbeck in Venetian Gothic revival style. The arms of the Cogan family are still visible on the building. When Cogan died in 1894 the house was occupied by his cousin Thomas More Madden and his son Richard More Madden. It was purchased by Colonel Eustace Maude in 1914 for £6,500.

On 5 February 1923, during the Irish Civil War, the building was burnt by an IRA flying column and remained ruined until its restoration in the 1970s.

A former steward's house located in the house farmyard now hosts a 3 acre garden which is open periodically to the public.

=== Churches ===
In 1833, the Church of Ireland parish of Kilbride, previously in the Union of Rathmore, was united with the parishes of Burgage and Boystown in the Union of Blessington. George Moore was responsible for the construction of St John's Protestant Church at Cloghleagh in 1834, built with a grant of £900 from the Board of First Fruits. His son served as curate of the parish.

A Catholic chapel, built in the village in 1776 and enlarged in 1835, was replaced by the current church in 1881, built with the patronage of William Henry Ford Cogan, who is commemorated in the church windows.

=== Roads and transport ===
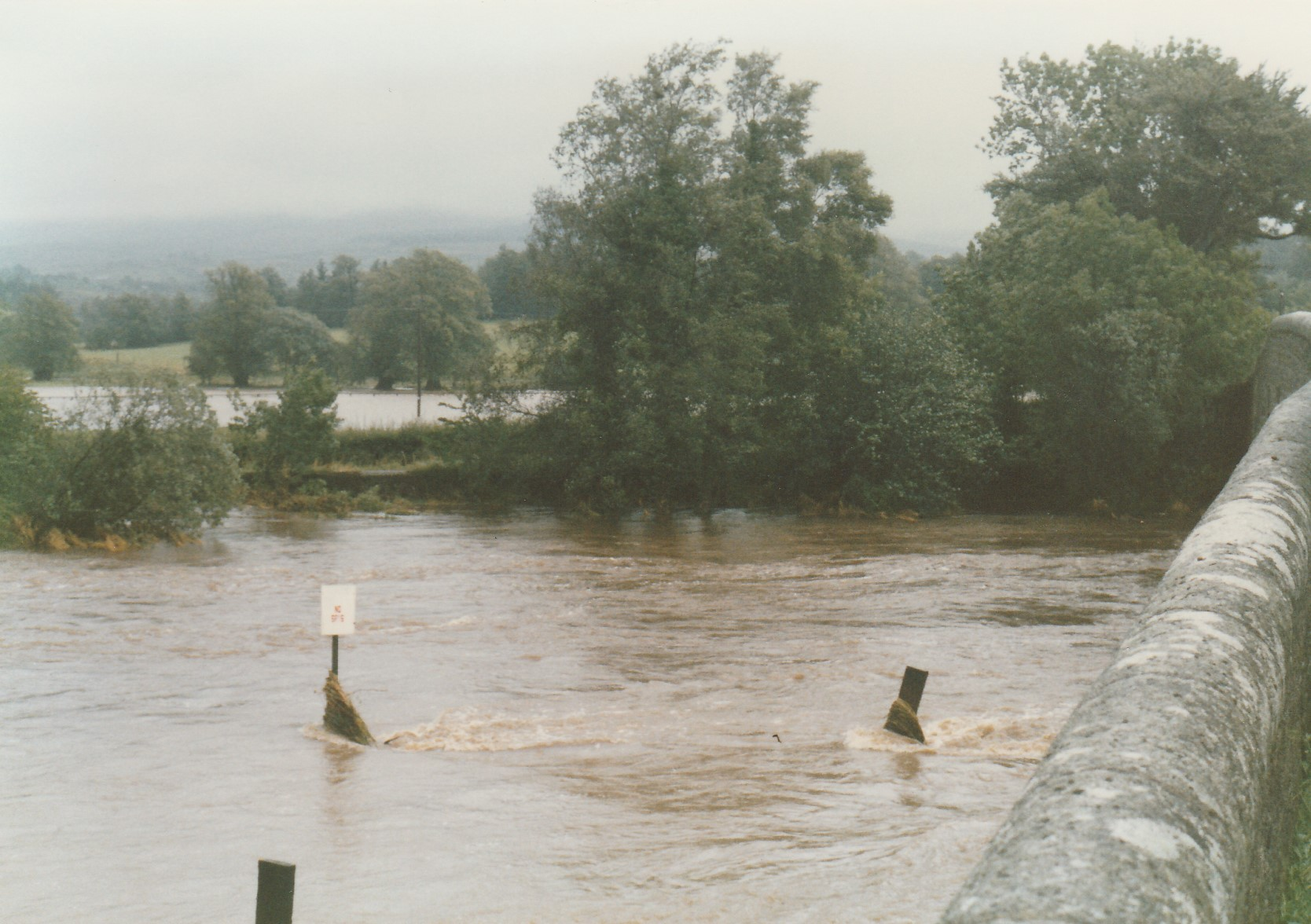
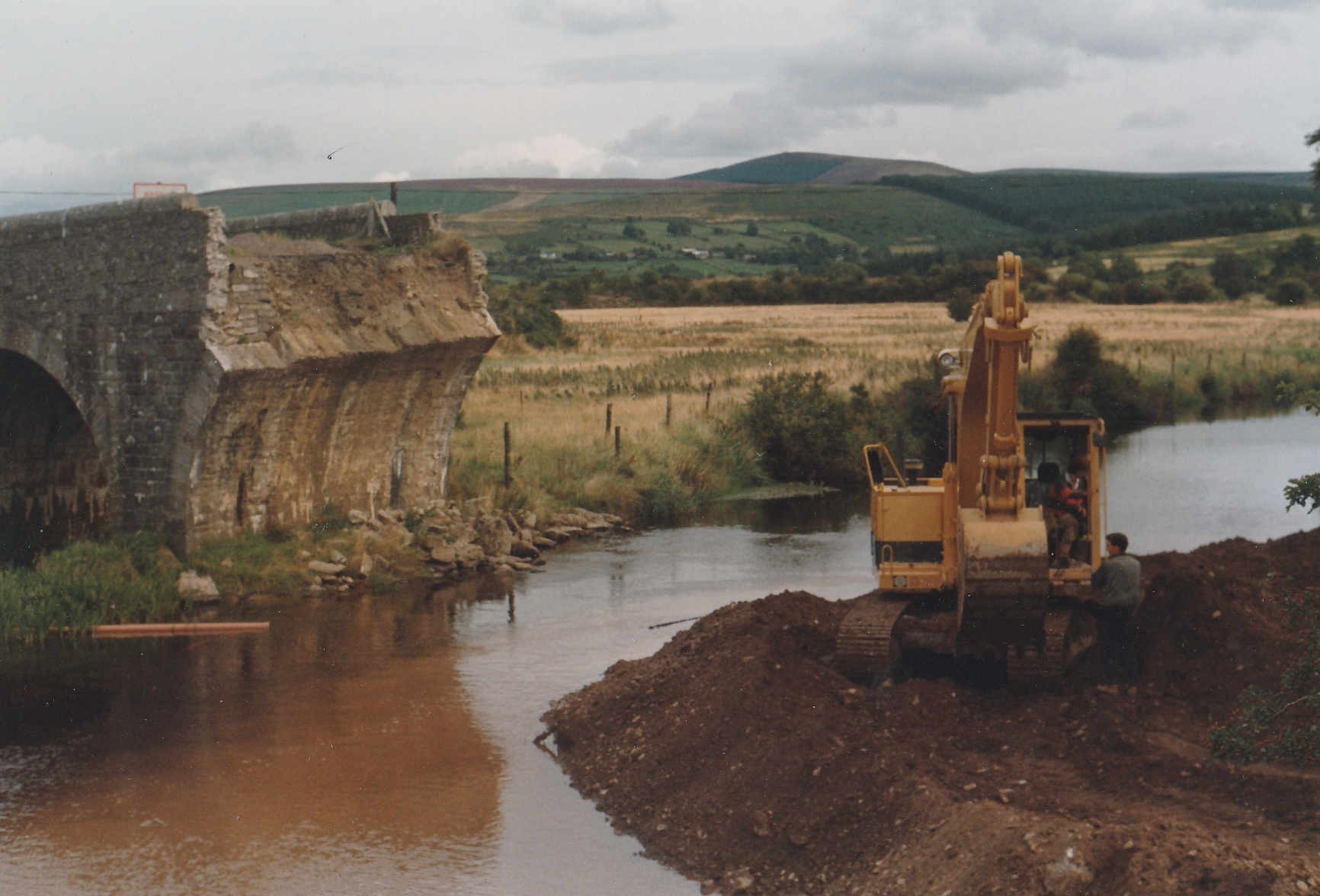
Ballyward Bridge during Hurricane Charley in 1986: floodwaters on the River Liffey on the left and demolition of the storm-damaged bridge on the right.

The route of the R759 road from Kilbride to the Sally Gap was laid down after 1760 and before 1778. The National Inventory of Architectural Heritage dates the stone bridge at Cloghleagh to c.1820. The 1838 OS maps depict an earlier road extending below the bridge to a ford across the River Liffey.

Traces of the Old road between Brittas and Tinode House, referred to in 1838 are visible northwest of the N81. A comparison of John Taylor's 1816 map and William Duncan's 1821 map suggests the modern road was laid down between those dates. As the medieval lordship of Kilbride was a possession of the Hospitaller preceptory of Kilteel the road from Kilbride to Kilteel, depicted on a map of 1752, may be of medieval origin. An eighteenth-century bridge across the Liffey at Ballyward collapsed after flooding on 5 September 1986. The townland names Áth Dúin and Áth Fhearaíl recorded in the 16th century, record early fording points across the Liffey and the Brittas Rivers, likely those marked on the 1838 OS map.

From 1888 to 1932, the Dublin and Blessington Steam Tramway ran along the current N81 road between Terenure and Poulaphouca. The tram stopped at The Lamb Tram Station at the top of the Kilbride Road. Joyce's Neighbourhood of Dublin describes the site in 1912:

"The Lamb" where there is now only a tram station and ticket office, but where in former times there stood an inn with the sign of "The Lamb" which has since left its name impressed on the locality.

The station building is still extant as a private dwelling. Cupidstown Hill is still known locally as the Lamb Hill.

A private airstrip operated from the field south of Glen Heste between 1946 and 1955.

=== Industry ===
Neville's 1760 map marks the freestone quarry on the slopes of Golden Hill which provided granite for Nelson's Pillar, the General Post Office, the Custom House and the Four Courts. When George Moore purchased the Kilbride estate in 1824, these quarries fell out of use, replaced by quarries at Ballyknockan. Their remains are still visible in the eastern face of Golden Hill. Traces of an abandoned iron mine from the 1860s are also visible north of Cloghleagh bridge, which were described by Weston St. John Joyce in 1912:

Keeping to the pathway, we presently reach a curious-looking stone house, which was erected as a residence for the manager of the iron mine some fifty years ago. It would seem that no earnest attempt was ever made to work this undertaking to a successful issue as the great stone segments of the crushing wheel, now lying beside the river, and other machinery obtained from England, were never put together, so that the whole concern was a failure from the start. Just beside the house is the entrance to the mine, the shaft of which, now closed up, extended a considerable way under the hill

The crushing wheel is still visible, but the house described, recorded in a Paddy Healy photograph, was demolished in the last decade. The ruined buildings of the Tinode Brick and Tile Company, incorporated in 1932, in receivership by January 1941, are visible next to the junction of the R759 and the N81.

=== Kilbride army camp ===
In 1894, Joseph Fletcher Moore was served with a compulsory purchase order for lands in Shankill to form an intended rifle range and camp. The Secretary of State for War entered into occupation of the lands in March 1895, but Moore contested the compensation offered. 1552 acres were leased in 1897 and a further 14 acres in 1899. The camp had accommodation for 8 Regimental Officers and 221 other ranks in 1904, but was not permanently occupied until the Irish War of Independence, when forty Black and Tan troops were quartered within. The camp passed into the possession of Irish forces on 21 March 1922, was occupied by Anti-Treaty forces during the Irish Civil War, fell into disuse during the emergency and was abandoned in 1955. After being briefly leased to An Óige in 1965 and 1966, it was re-occupied by the Irish Army in the 1970s, established as a Permanent Staff Camp in 1982 and is still used by the Irish Army. Early photographs of the camp are accessible on the website of the National Library of Ireland.

== Kilbride today ==
Kilbride ED had a population of 975 at the 2011 census. St. Brigid's National School replaced the school at Knockatillane in 1969; the old schoolhouses survive as a private dwelling. St. Brigid's National School had 130 pupils in 2011.

The RIC station is incorporated into the private dwelling adjoining Craul's shop, facing the entrance to the graveyard. The original national school also survives as a private dwelling. The 1767 datestone of the old Burgage Bridge, demolished before the creation of Poulaphouca Reservoir, is incorporated into the adjacent wall. St. John's Church at Cloghleagh is in use by the Church of Ireland. Kippure estate is occupied by a holiday village, with only the gate lodge and some traces of the original buildings surviving. The Lamb Tram Station, Kilbride Manor and Tinode House, the last restored in 1973, survive in private ownership and are listed in the Record of Protected Structures for County Wicklow. The public house recorded in the 1901 Census survives in altered form as Mooney's Public House (which has since closed), run by descendants of Mary Lalor.

The village and parish of Kilbride is located within a designated Area of Outstanding Natural Beauty. The Special Area of Conservation (002122) encompassing the Wicklow Mountains extends across Shankill, Cloghleagh, Scurlocksleap, Athdown and Kippure.

== People ==
Former or current residents of the village have included:

- William H. F. Cogan (1823–1894), Irish Whig (and later Liberal) politician who built nearby Tinode House in 1864
- Ciarán Jones (1986–2011), Garda and posthumous winner of a People of the Year Award 2012 for the bravery shown in his actions protecting others from the floods of winter 2011 near the village at Ballysmuttan Bridge (renamed the Ciarán Jones Bridge in his honour)
- John Henry Leech (1862–1900), English entomologist who lived in nearby Kippure House in 1891
- Reverend William Ogle Moore (1801–1874), curate of Blessington and Kilbride parishes
- Jim Ruttle, Irish retired Fianna Fáil politician who served as a member of Seanad Éireann from 1980 to 1981
- Claire Walsh (born 1994), Irish footballer who plays for the Republic of Ireland women's national team
- Robert Walsh (1772–1852), Irish clergyman, historian, writer and physician

== Online sources ==
- Record of Monuments and Places: Archaeological Survey of Ireland - * National Monuments Service
- Ordnance Survey Maps: WebCite query result
- Primary Valuation of Ireland: Griffith's Valuation
- 1901 Census of Ireland: National Archives: Census of Ireland 1901/1911
- 1911 Census of Ireland: National Archives: Census of Ireland 1901/1911
