= Scarr =

Mountain in Wicklow, Ireland

Scarr Mountain
- skajar
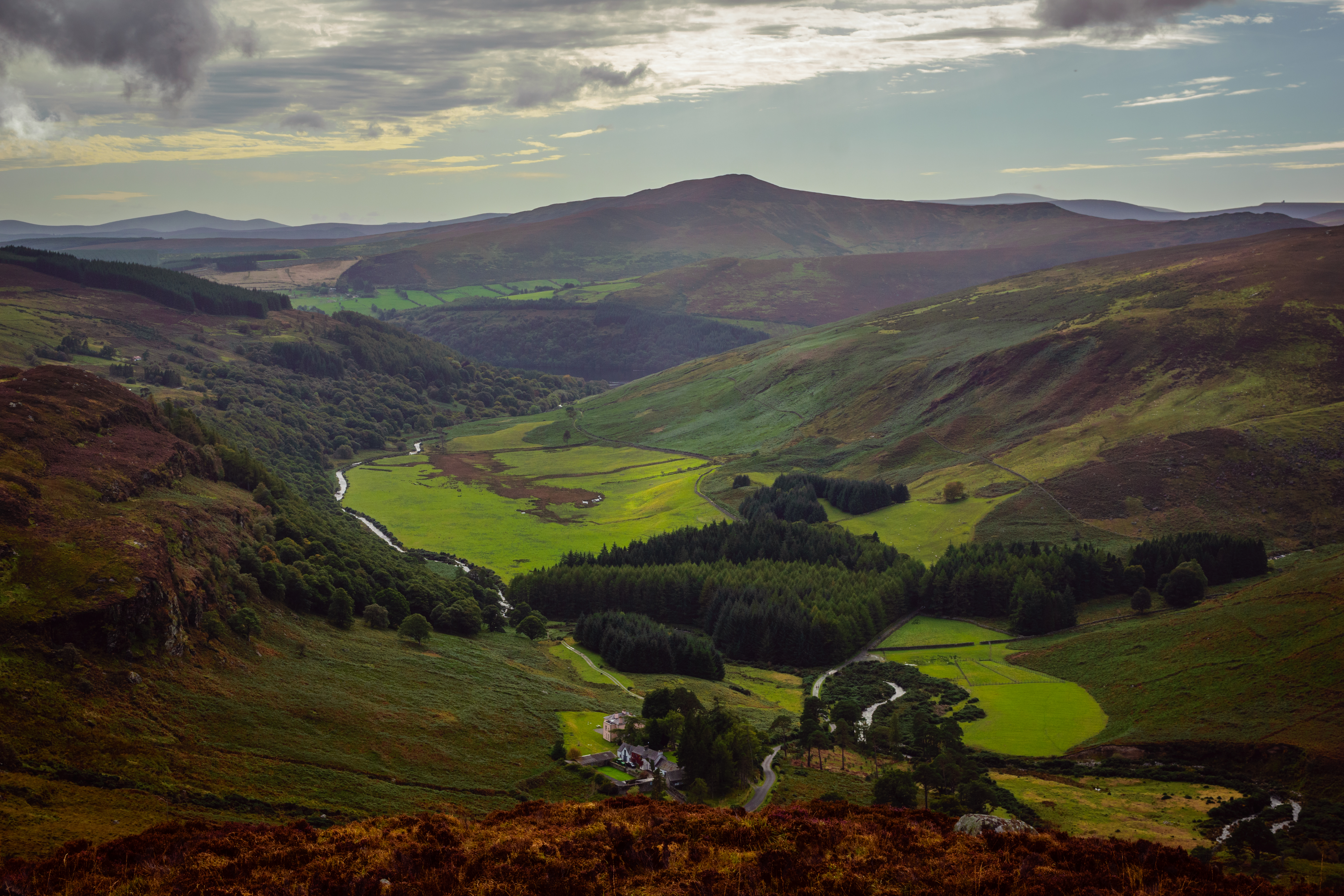
- Distinctive peak of Scarr, viewed from the R759 above the Luggala Estate

Highest point
- Elevation: 641 m (2,103 ft)
- Prominence: 231 m (758 ft)
- Listing: Marilyn, Hewitt, Arderin, Simm, Vandeleur-Lynam
- Coordinates: 53.055277°N 6.311412°W

Naming
- English translation: sharp rock
- Language of name: Irish

Geography
- Location within island of Ireland
- Location: County Wicklow, Ireland
- Parent range: Wicklow Mountains
- OSI/OSNI grid: O1326801828
- Topo map: OSi Discovery 56

Geology
- Mountain type(s): Dark blue-grey slate, phyllite & schist

Climbing
- Easiest route: Via Oldbridge at Lough Dan

Scarr Mountain at 641 metres (2,103 ft), is the 174th–highest peak in Ireland on the Arderin scale, and the 207th–highest peak on the Vandeleur-Lynam scale. Scarr is situated in the central sector of the Wicklow Mountains range, but off main "central spine" of the range that runs from Kippure in the north, to Lugnaquillia in the south. Scarr lies on its own small massif that includes Scarr North-West Top 561 metres (1,841 ft) and Kanturk 523 metres (1,716 ft); it is bounded by Lough Dan to the east and the Glenmacnass Valley on the west. Scarr's sharp peak gives it a distinctive profile amongst the rounded summits of the Wicklow mountains, and it forms the backdrop to scenic views across the Guinness Estate and Lough Dan.

== Hill walking ==
A popular trail is the 14-kilometre (8.7 mi), four-to-five hour long Scarr and Kanturk Loop walk, which starts at a lay-by outside Oldbridge (O158019) at the southern end of Lough Dan. The recommended route is counter-clockwise, summiting Kanturk first and then crossing to the summit of Scarr before returning to Oldbridge.

== Gallery ==
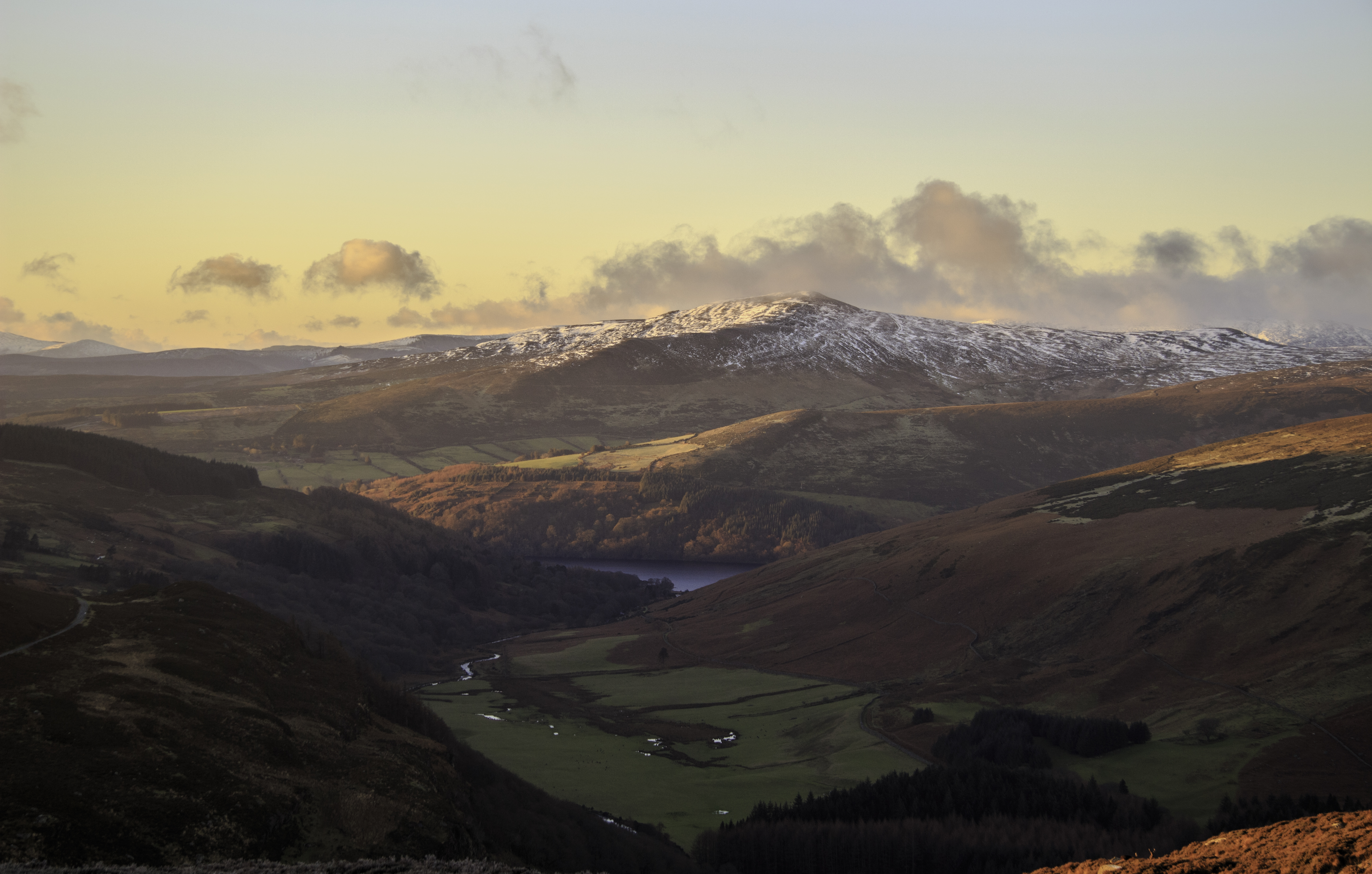
Scarr in Winter

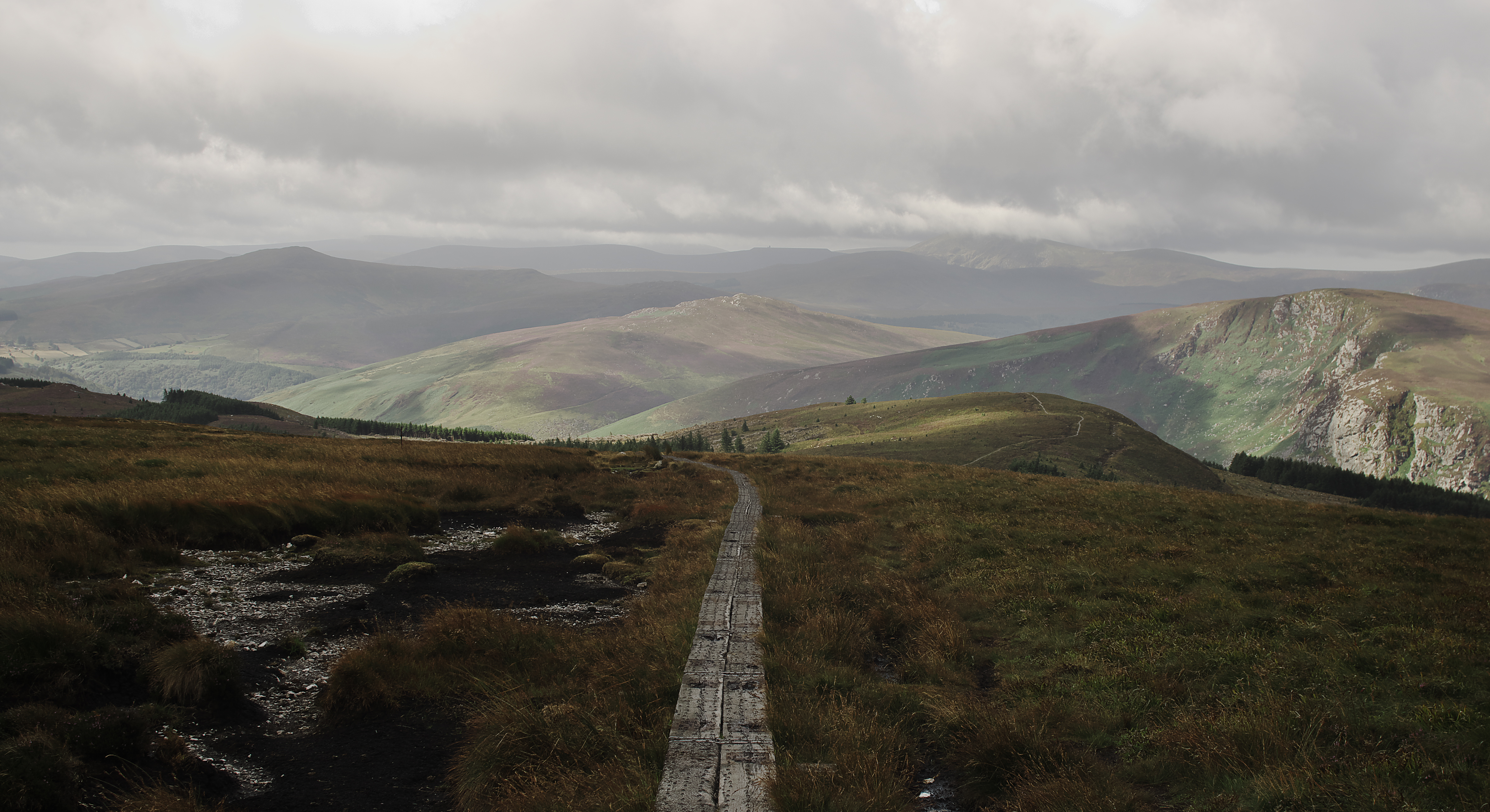
Scarr (left) from White Hill boardwalk on Djouce

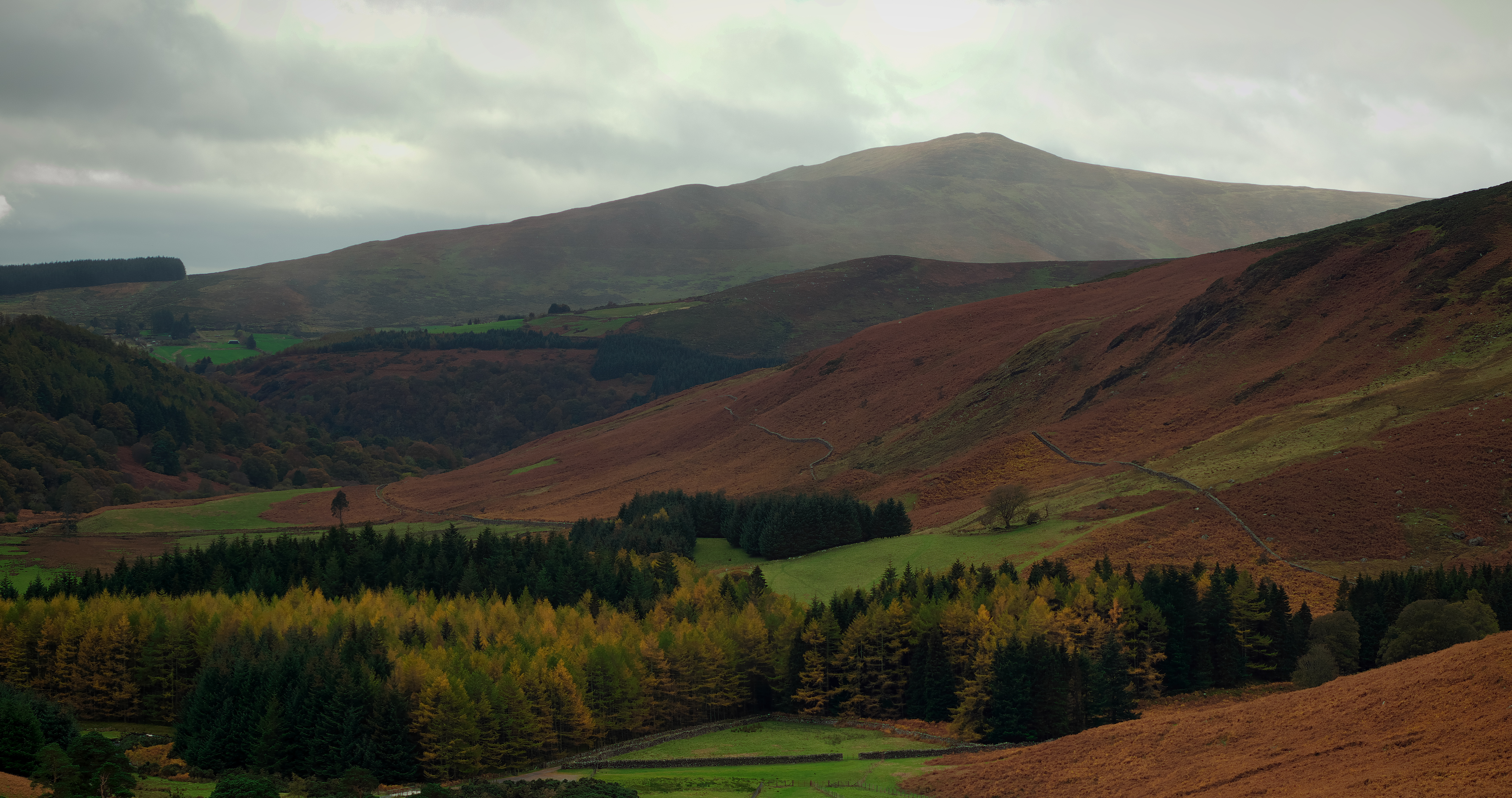
From the Guinness Estate

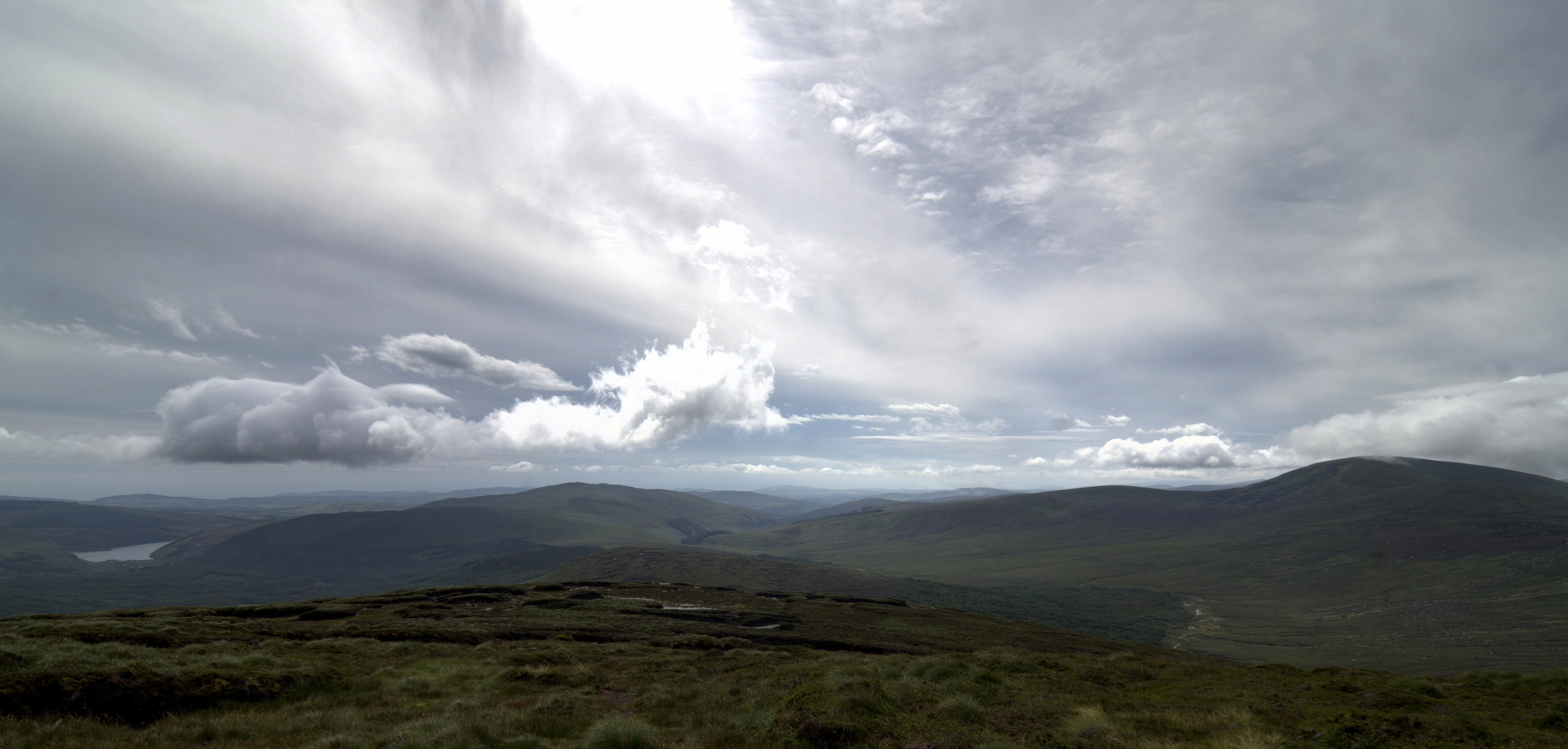
Lough Dan, Scarr, and Tonelagee, from Mullaghcleevaun

== See also ==
- Wicklow Way
- Wicklow Round
- Wicklow Mountains
- Lists of mountains in Ireland
- List of mountains of the British Isles by height
- List of Marilyns in the British Isles
- List of Hewitt mountains in England, Wales and Ireland

== Bibliography ==
- Fairbairn, Helen (2014). Dublin & Wicklow: A Walking Guide. Collins Press. ISBN 978-1848892019.
- Fairbairn, Helen (2014). Ireland's Best Walks: A Walking Guide. Collins Press. ISBN 978-1848892118.
- MountainViews Online Database (Simon Stewart) (2013). A Guide to Ireland's Mountain Summits: The Vandeleur-Lynams & the Arderins. Collins Books. ISBN 978-1-84889-164-7.
- Dillion, Paddy (1993). The Mountains of Ireland: A Guide to Walking the Summits. Cicerone. ISBN 978-1852841102.
