= Glenmacnass Waterfall =

Waterfall in Wicklow, Ireland

- Gleann Log an Easa
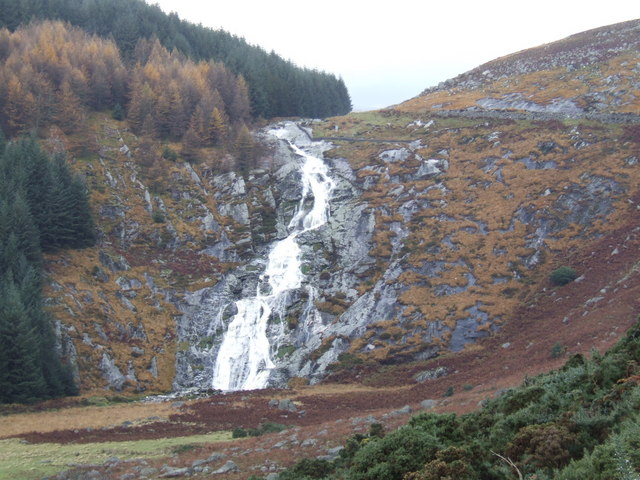
- Interactive map of Glenmacnass Waterfall
- Location: Wicklow Mountains, Ireland
- Coordinates: 53°03′51″N 6°20′13″W
- Type: Cascade
- Elevation: 350 metres (1,150 ft)
- Total height: 80 metres (260 ft)
- Number of drops: 3
- Watercourse: Glenmacnass River

Glenmacnass Waterfall (Irish: Gleann Log an Easa, meaning 'The glen of the hollow of the waterfall') is an 80-metre high waterfall situated at the head of the Glenmacnass Valley in the Wicklow Mountains in Ireland. The Glenmacnass Waterfall is a popular tourist destination and scenic viewpoint area in the Wicklow Mountains. The Waterfall is bounded to the west by Tonelagee, and to the east by Scarr mountain. The entire Glenmacnass Valley can be accessed by the R115 road (also called the Military Road), which connects the Sally Gap in the north, to the village of Laragh in the south.

== Geography ==
The Glenmacnass River begins high up on the southeast slopes of Mullaghcleevaun 849 metres (2,785 ft), with smaller tributaries flowing in from the eastern slopes of Tonelagee 817 metres (2,680 ft); the river then reaches the top of the waterfall at an elevation of 350 metres (1,150 ft) above sea-level, where it falls 80 metres (260 ft) down the waterfall in 3 staggered drops to an elevation of 270 metres (890 ft) above sea-level, where it reaches the Glenmacnass Valley floor.

The river continues through the U-shaped valley until it joins the Avonmore River (Irish: Abhainn Mór, meaning 'big river') at the village of Laragh. It is later joined by the Avonbeg (Irish: Abhainn Beag, meaning 'small river') to become the Avoca and eventually flows into the Irish Sea at the coastal town called Arklow.

== Geology ==
Geological Survey of Ireland (GSI) regard the valley as a "stunning example of a glaciated U-shaped valley, with oversteepened cliff sides and a flat floor". The valley dates from the last glacial period called the quaternary glaciation or Ice Age, and contains moraines marking the positions of the ice-front as it retreated back towards the source area higher up in the centre of the Wicklow mountains. The GSI highlight an impressive moraine about halfway between the waterfall and Laragh and can be seen as a boulder-strewn mound running right across the valley.

Glenmacnass Waterfall flows over grey-colored, smooth porphyritic granite bedrock (part of the Lugnaquilla pluton, which is itself from the late-Caledonian (405 Ma) Leinster Granite Batholith Formation). Further down the valley, on each side of the waterfall, dark grey-to-black, jagged schist rock (part of the Lower Palaeozoic Maulin Formation) can be seen jutting out; thus the waterfall has formed at the boundary between these two major rock types.

== Access ==
The Glenmacnass Waterfall is a popular tourist destination and scenic viewpoint area in the Wicklow Mountains, and the entire Glenmacnass Valley can be accessed by the R115 road (also called the Military Road), which connects the Sally Gap to Laragh. There are parking facilities at the top of the waterfall, and the waterfall and valley are in the Wicklow Mountains National Park.

== Gallery ==
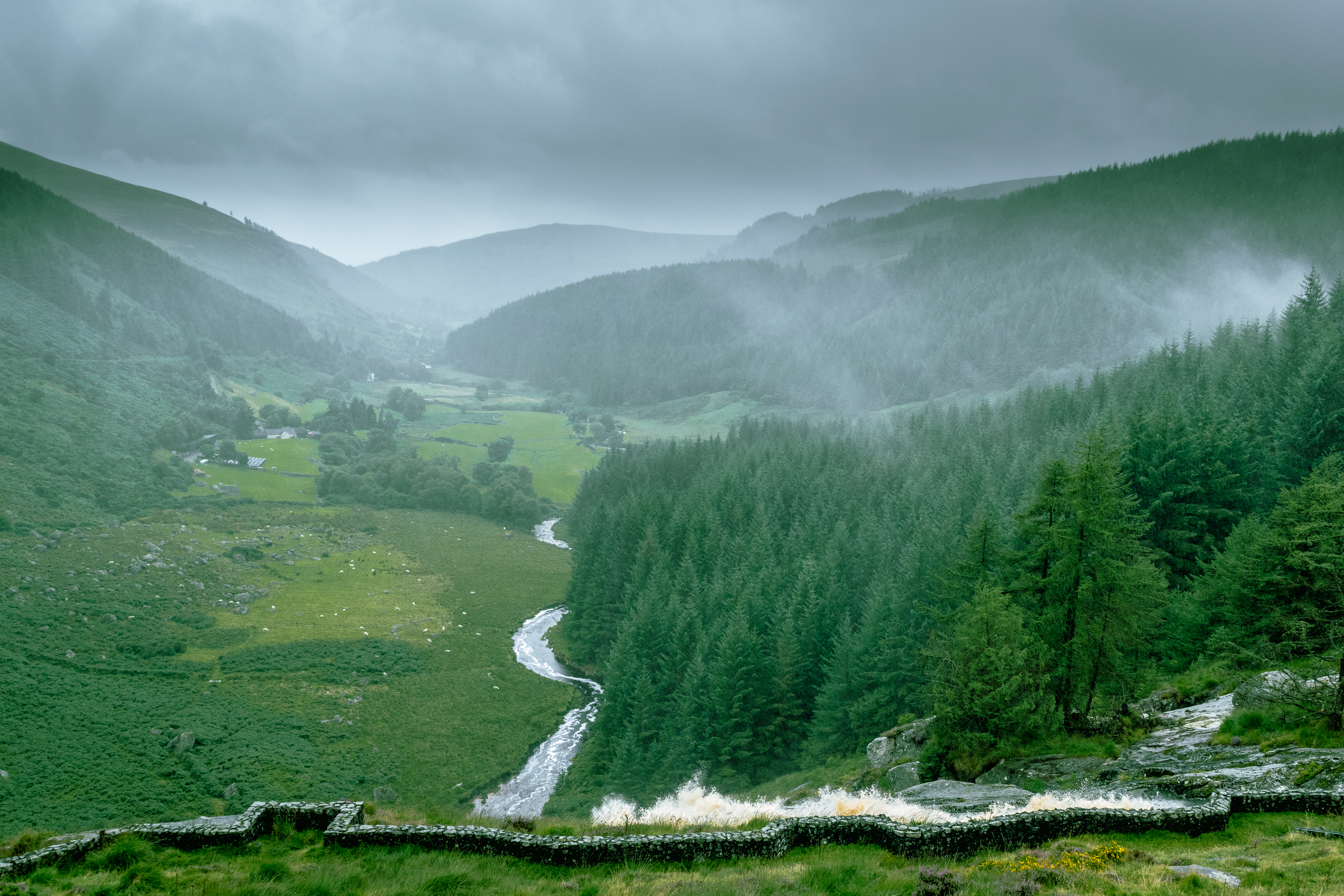
Mist on the waterfall

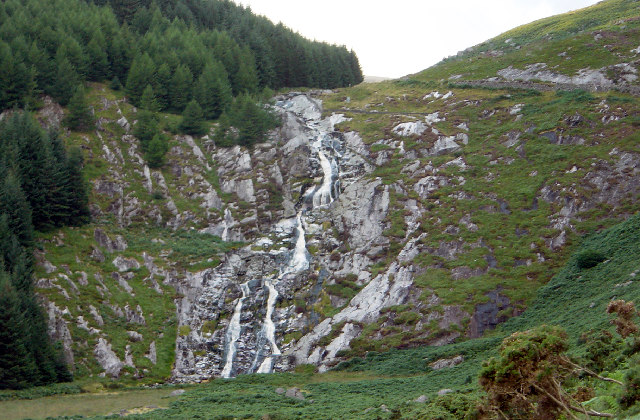
From south

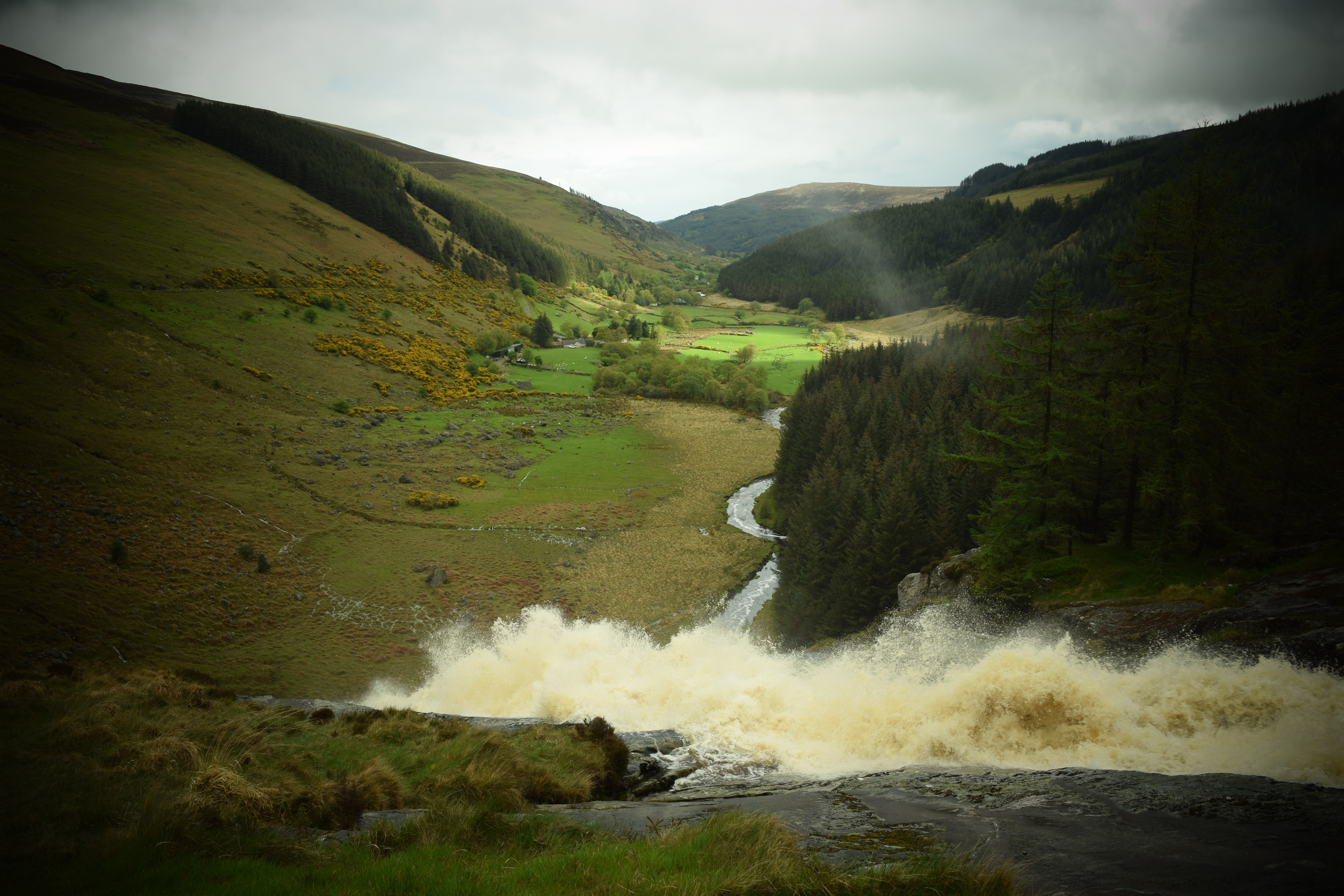
Heavy flow

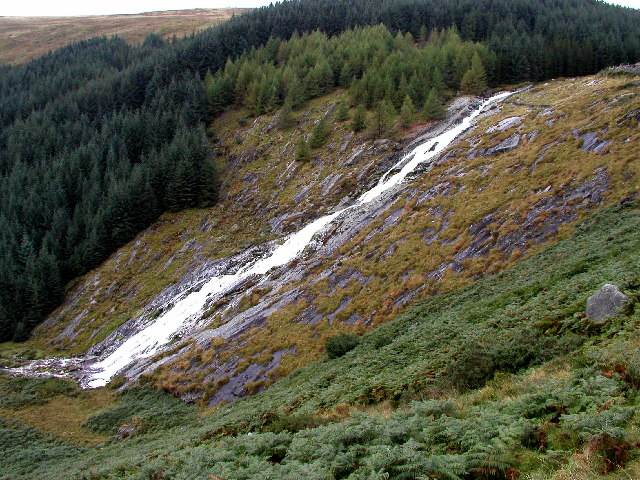
From Military Road

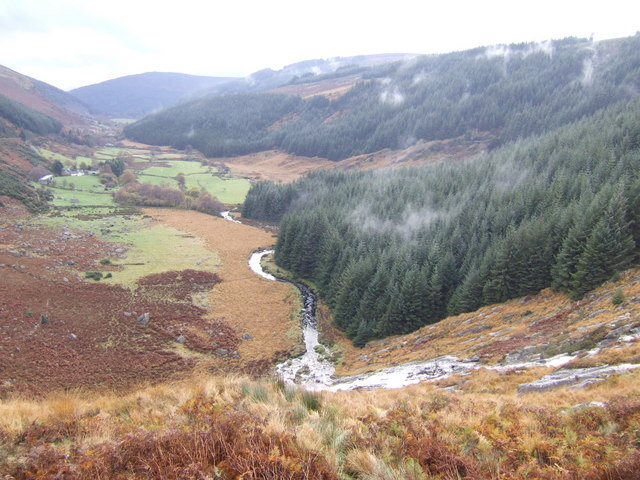
Glenmacnass valley

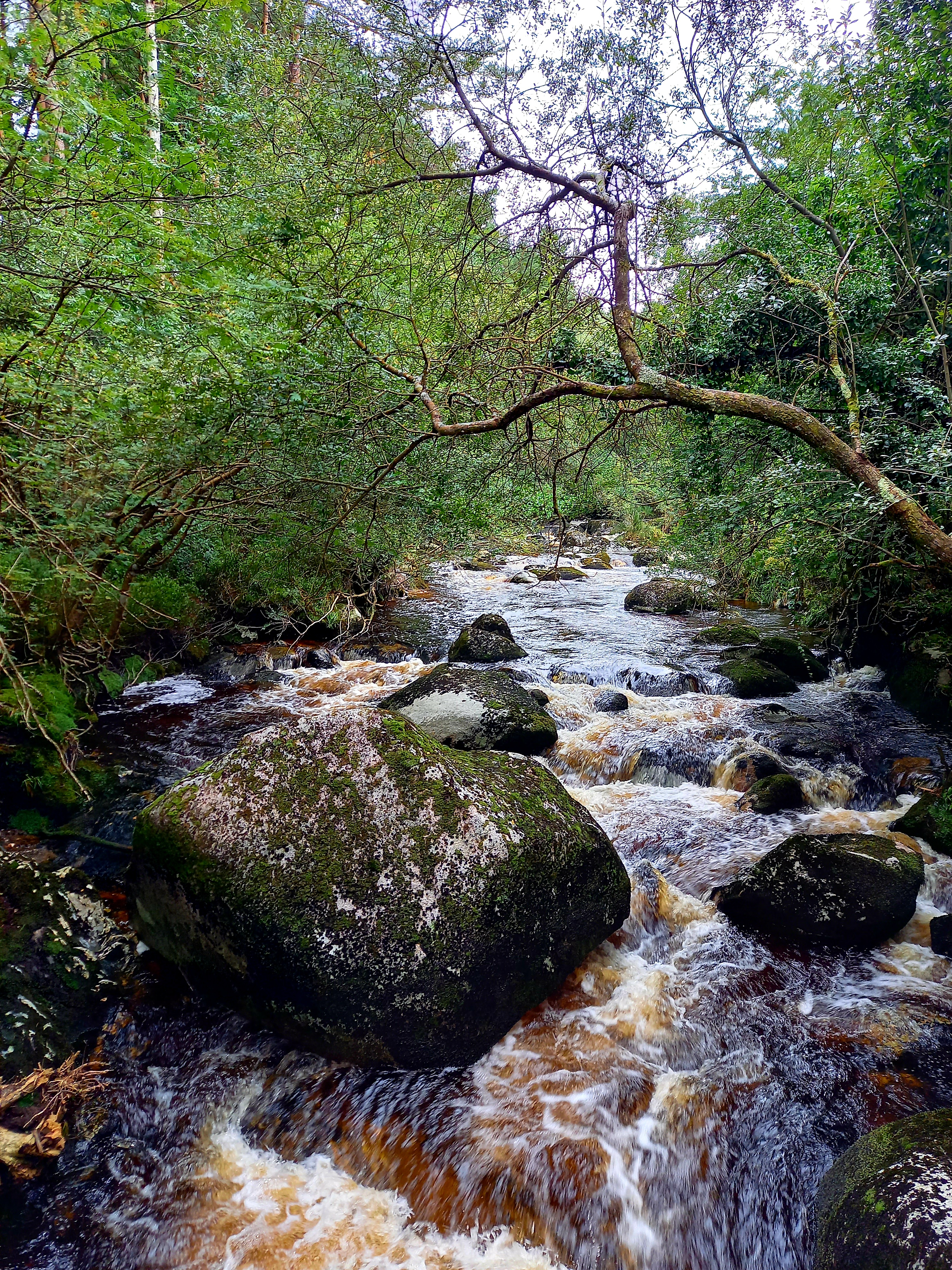
Glenmacnass River above Laragh

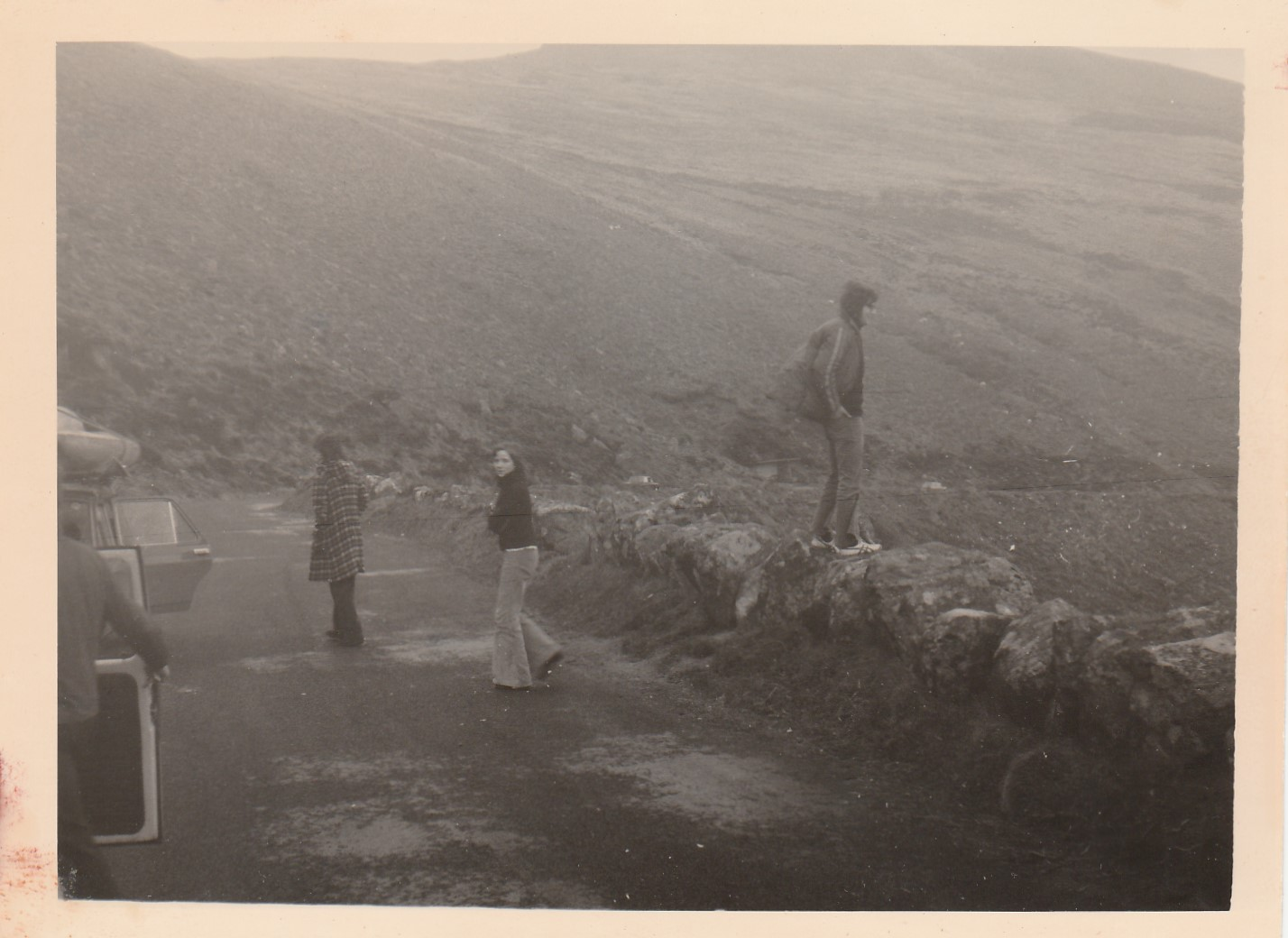
Young people visiting the waterfall in the 1970s

== See also ==
- List of waterfalls
- Powerscourt Waterfall
- Powerscourt Estate
- Torc Waterfall
