= Lough Tay =

Lake in the Wicklow Mountains, Ireland

- The Guinness Lake, Luggala Lake
- Loch Té (Irish)
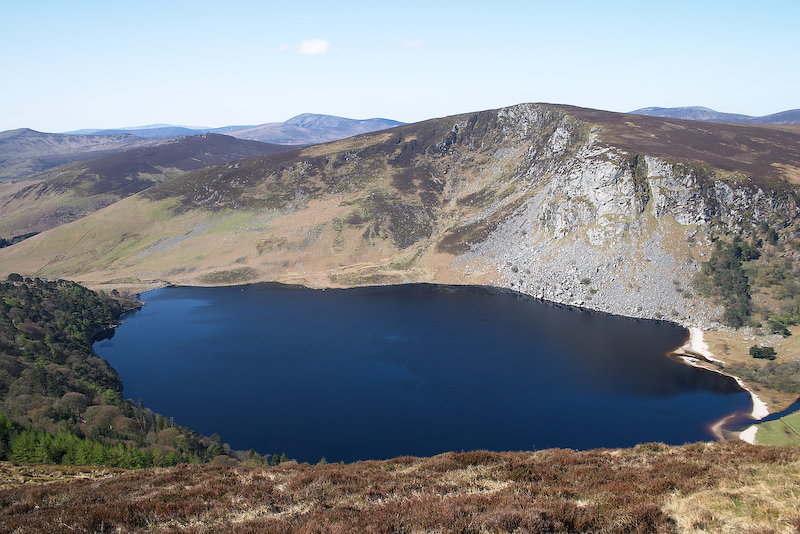
- Lough Tay with the east-facing granite cliffs of Luggala overlooking behind

- Location within Ireland
- Location: Wicklow Mountains, County Wicklow
- Coordinates: 53.106014°N 6.266763°W
- Primary inflows: Cloghoge River
- Primary outflows: Cloghoge River
- Basin countries: Ireland
- Surface area: 48.1 ha (119 acres)
- Average depth: 10.1 m (33 ft)
- Max. depth: 35 m (115 ft)
- Water volume: 5 gigalitres (4,100 acre⋅ft)
- Surface elevation: 246 m (807 ft)
- Islands: none

Lough Tay (Irish: Loch Té) is a small but scenic lake set on private property in the Wicklow Mountains in Ireland. The lake lies between the mountains of Djouce 725 metres (2,379 ft), and Luggala 595 metres (1,952 ft), and is dominated by Luggala's east-facing granite cliffs. The lough is fed by the Cloghoge River, which then drains into Lough Dan to the south. The entire of Lough Tay belongs to the Guinness Estate at Luggala, and has limited public access.

== Naming ==
The name is believed to derive from the Proto-Indo-European root *teh₂-, "melt", "dissolve", "flow," also seen in Scotland's River Tay, River Teviot, Water of Tanar, or to teith, "warm." Some sources connect the name to tea, but the name was recorded as far back as the 1650s Down Survey as "Logh Tea," when tea was unknown in Ireland. The nickname, 'The Guinness Lake' name comes from the former owners of the land. The lake is part of the former Guinness estate, owned by Arthur Guinness. Another claimed reason for it to be called the "Guinness Lake" is that the Guinness family imported white sand and laid it over a beach on the northern shore of the lake to make it look like a pint of Guinness.

== Scenic viewpoint ==
The view into Lough Tay (with the cliffs of Luggala behind) is a popular scenic viewpoint in Wicklow and is easily viewed from one of the several car-parks along the R759 road (e.g. Ballinastoe Wood, and the J.B. Malone car-parks). A short hike up the first boardwalked section of the path to the summit of Djouce mountain, to the J.B. Malone memorial stone (part of the 131-kilometre Wicklow Way trail), is another popular scenic viewpoint of the lough.

== Culture ==
=== Bertrand Russell ===
The philosopher Bertrand Russell said that when he was young he twice visited Ireland with his Aunt Agatha he visited Lough Tay. He visited on his own and with Michael Davitt and he said that the beautiful scenery made a profound impression on him and highlighted the small lake at Luggala. He returned half a century later with his friend Crompton Davies and they revisited Luggala but they looked over it from a wood set above the lake rather than the pebbly shore Russell remembered. This experience convinced Russell that one should not try and renew old memories.

=== Guinness Estate ===
On the shore of Lough Tay is an ornamental building known as the Temple. Next to it are three graves of members of the Guinness family. One of those buried there is Tara Browne, whose death in a car accident was an inspiration for the Beatles song "A Day in the Life"; the two others are his unnamed infant brother, who was born and died in December 1943, and his half-sister.

=== Vikings (TV series) ===
Lough Tay is the setting for the fictional village of Kattegat in the 2013 television historical drama series Vikings.

=== Film usage ===
Lough Tay, the Guinness Estate at Luggala and its owner Garech Browne feature in the 1991 film I Dreamt I Woke Up by John Boorman (online). Lough Tay features prominently in such movies as Zardoz (1974) and Excalibur (1981), by John Boorman. It also appears in the 2024 Netflix film Irish Wish.

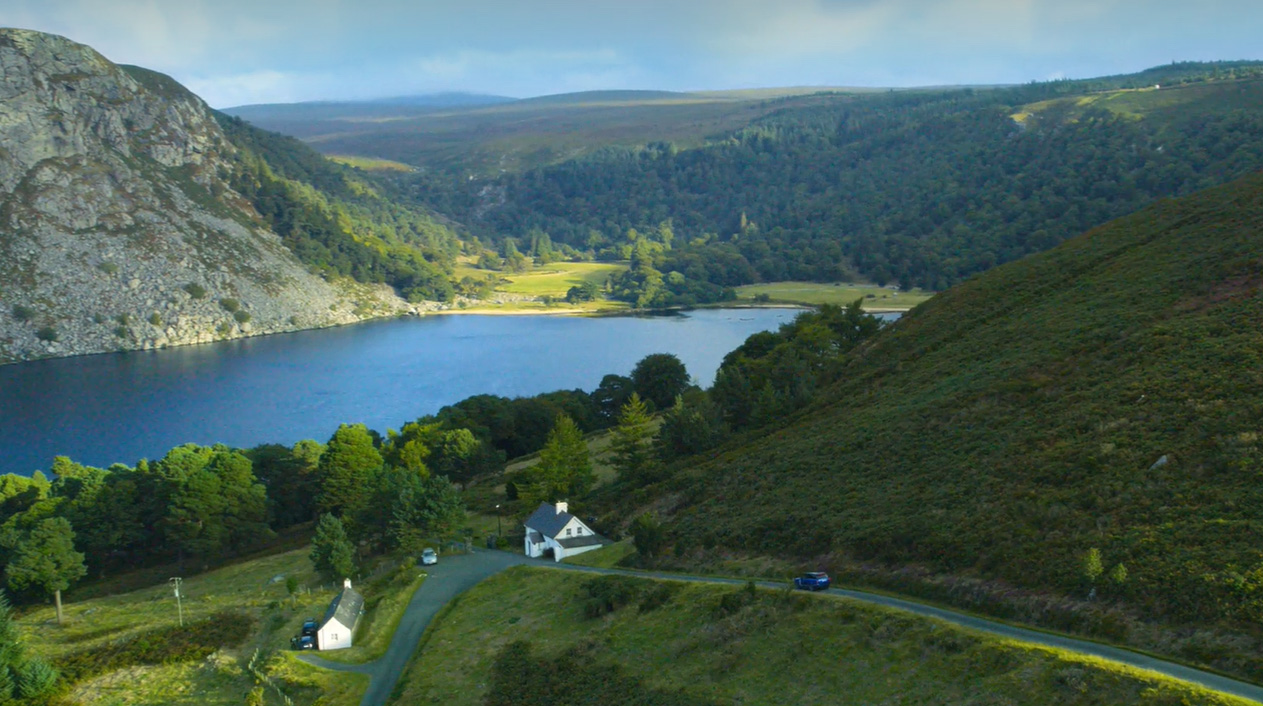
Capture of Irish Wish trailer

== Gallery ==
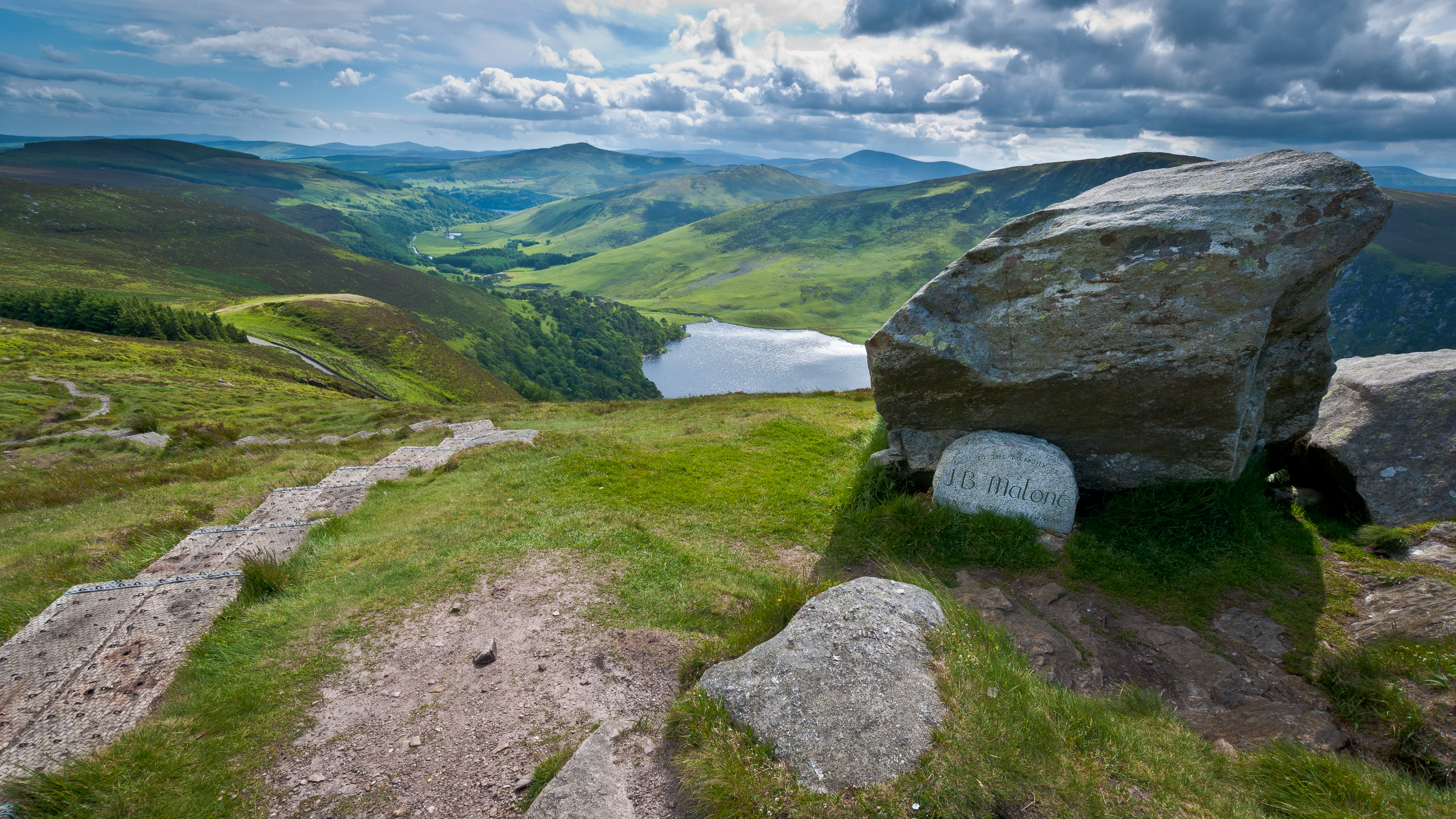
J.B. Malone memorial stone on Djouce.

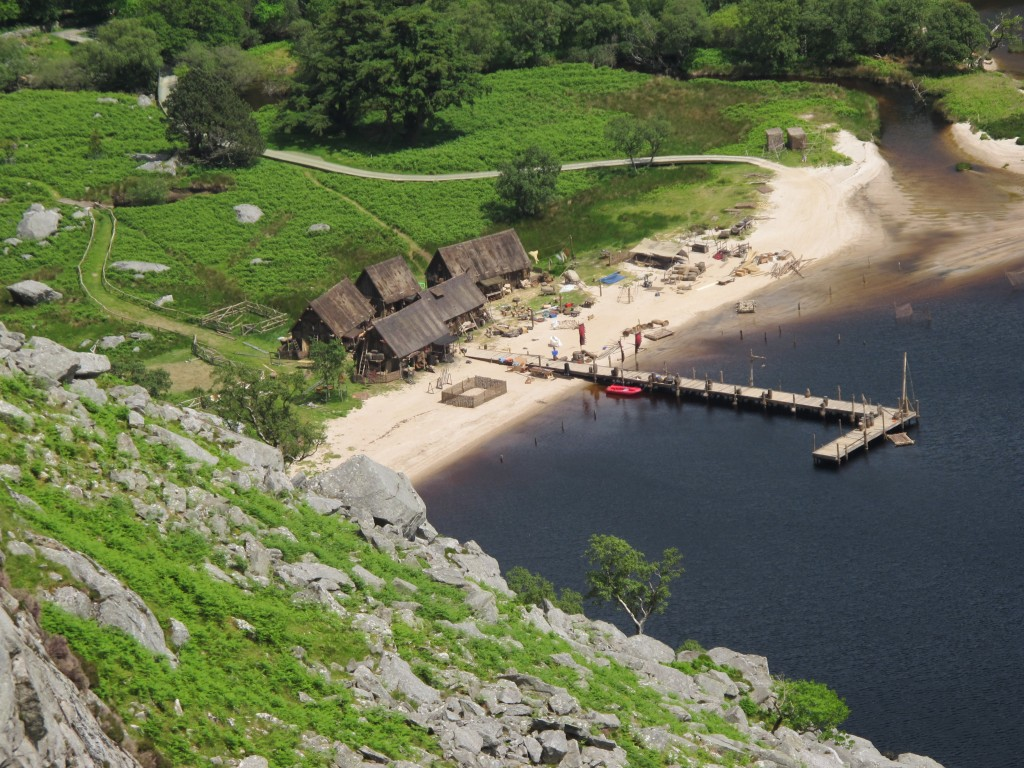
Set of Kattegat on television series, Vikings.

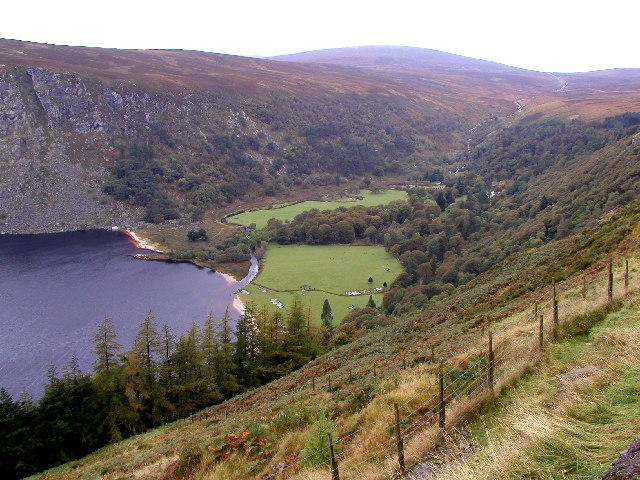
View into Luggala Castle.

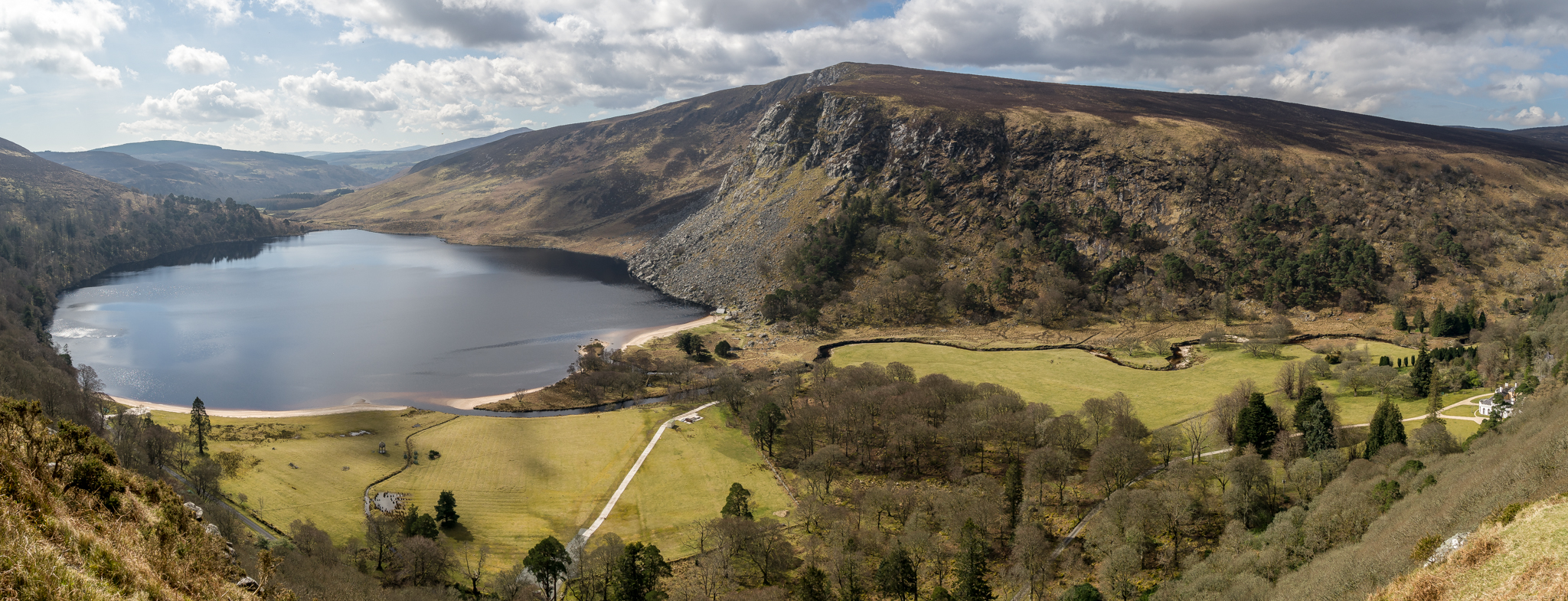
Lough Tay, Luggala, and Luggala Castle.

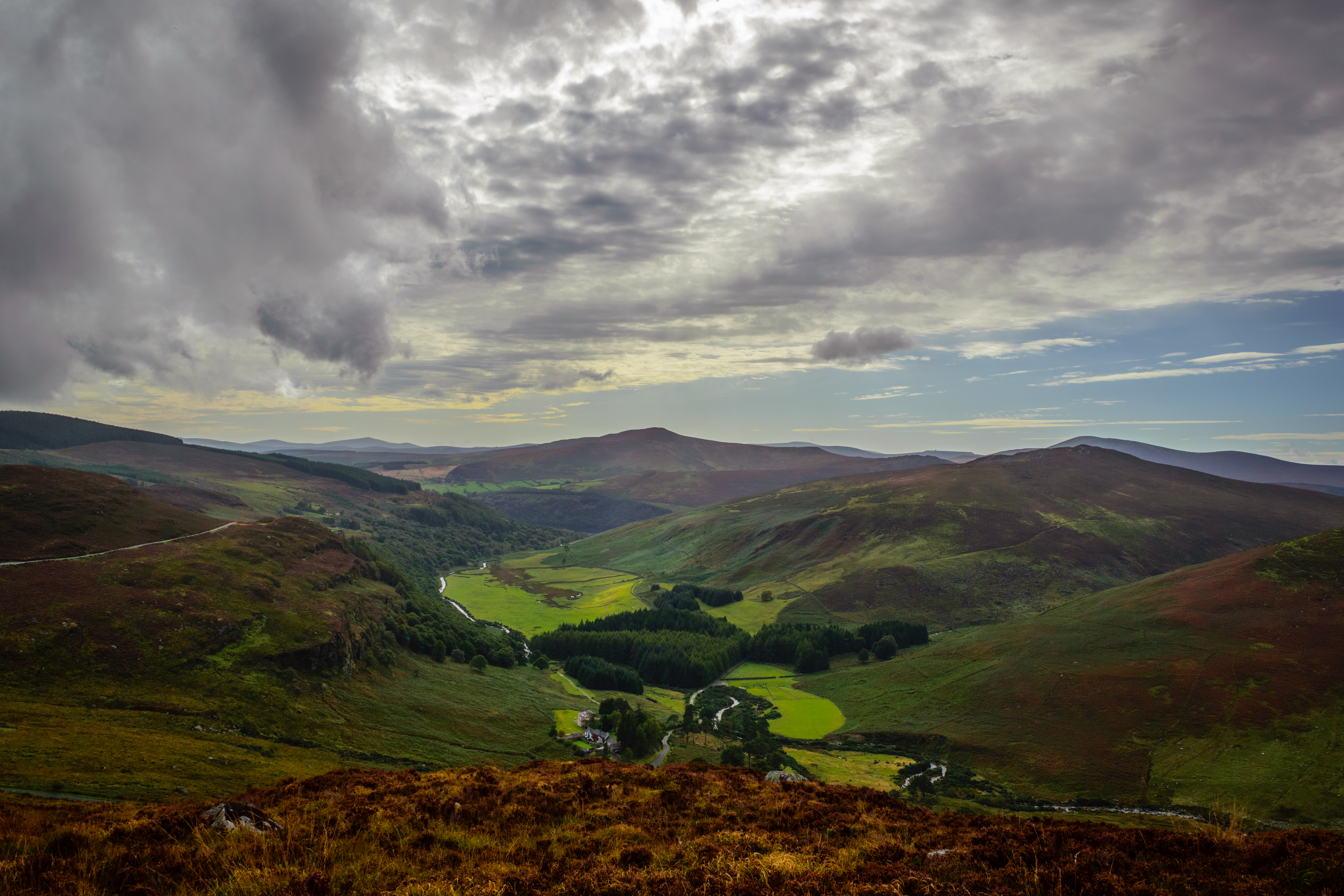
Cloghoge River between Lough Tay and Lough Dan

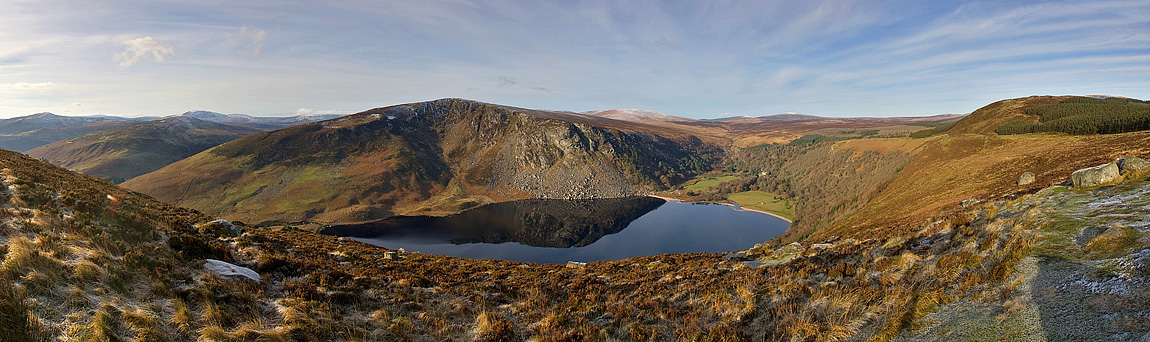
Luggala Estate

== See also ==
- List of loughs of Ireland
- Wicklow Way
- Wicklow Mountains
- Lists of mountains in Ireland
