= Luggala =

Mountain in Wicklow, Ireland

- Fancy Mountain
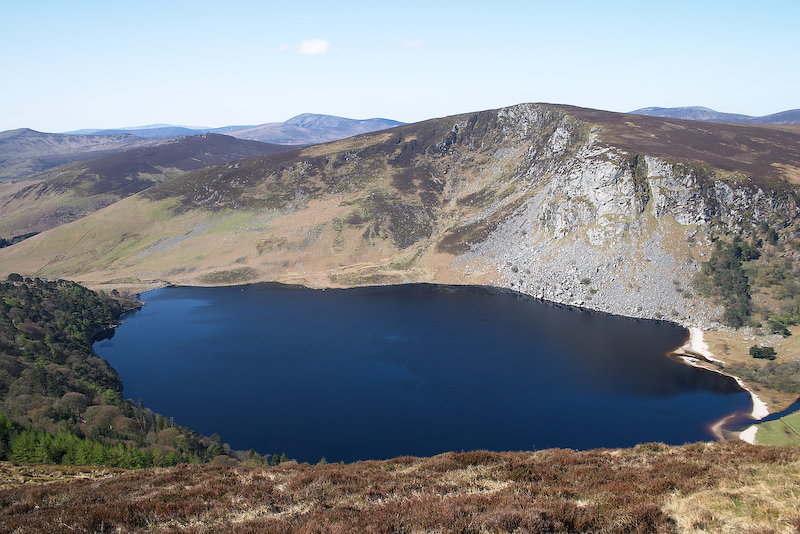
- Luggala behind Lough Tay

Highest point
- Elevation: 595 m (1,952 ft)
- Prominence: 110 m (360 ft)
- Listing: Arderin
- Coordinates: 53°06′21″N 6°17′01″W

Naming
- Native name: Log an Lágh (Irish)
- English translation: Hollow of the hill
- Pronunciation: /ˌlʌɡəˈlɑː/ Irish: [ˈl̪ˠɔɡ ə ˈl̪ˠaː]

Geography
- Location within island of Ireland
- Location: County Wicklow, Ireland
- Parent range: Wicklow Mountains
- OSI/OSNI grid: O1501307403
- Topo map: OSi Discovery 56

Geology
- Mountain type: Granite with microcline phenocrysts

Climbing
- Easiest route: Wicklow Way, from R759 north

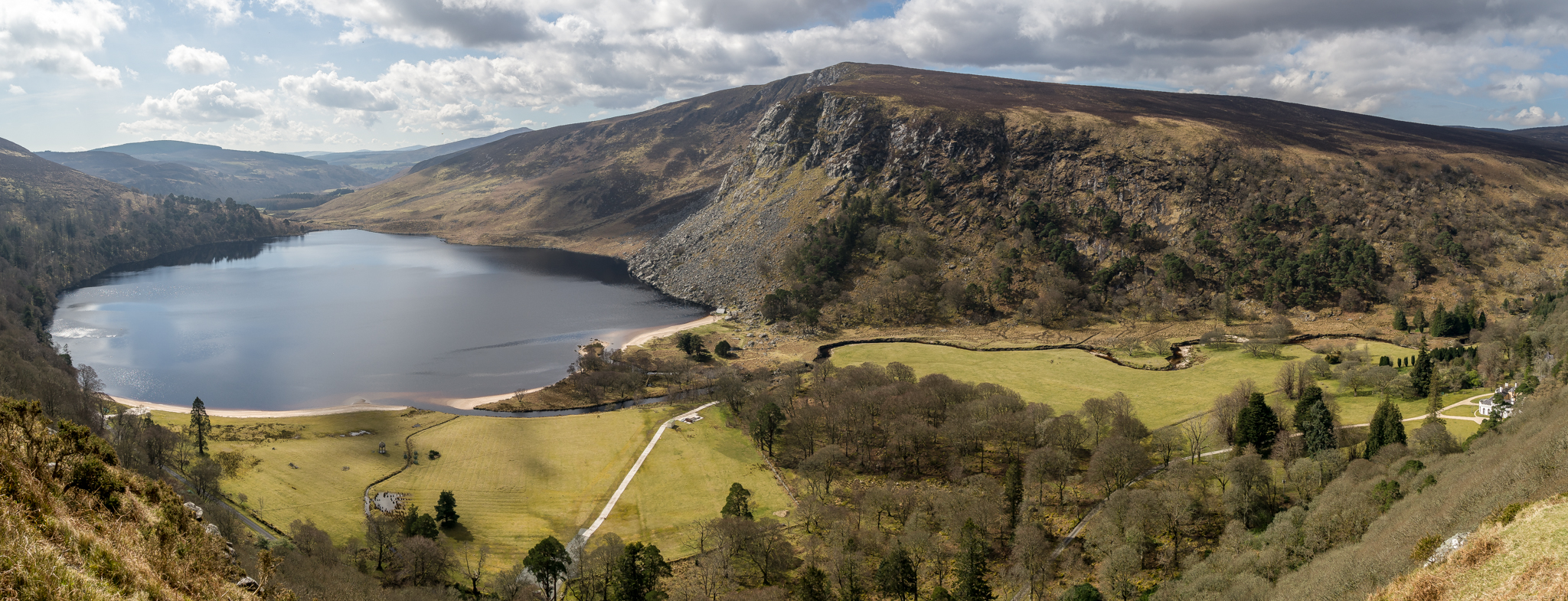
Lough Tay (l), Luggala (c), and Luggala Lodge (r)

Luggala (Irish: Log an Lá, meaning 'Hollow of the hill'), (Note: Irish academic Paul Tempan disputes whether the translation of "hill" is correct, and instead records the translation as "hollow of the [obscure element]".) also called Fancy Mountain (from Irish Fuinnse 'ash-tree') at 595 metres (1,952 ft), is the 230th-highest peak in Ireland on the Arderin scale. Being below 600 metres (2,000 ft), it does not rank on the Vandeleur-Lynam or Hewitt scales. Luggala is in the northeastern section of the Wicklow Mountains in Ireland, and overlooks the Lough Tay, which lies at the base of the steep granite cliffs on Luggala's eastern face. As well as a noted scenic point in County Wicklow, Luggala's eastern cliffs have many graded rock-climbing routes.

Luggala Lodge, Lough Tay and 5,000 acres of surrounding land are owned by Luggala Estate Ltd an Irish company ultimately owned by Romito SA - Switzerland, a company with global investments at the forefront of environmental and heritage conservation.

The estate dates from the 18th century when it was developed by the La Touche family, and then by the Guinness family from 1937 to its sale in 2019. The estate was the location of several films (e.g. Braveheart in 1995), and television series (e.g. Vikings from 2013), as well as visits by notable artists and musicians (e.g. the Beatles and Michael Jackson).

There are no public rights of way or rights of access to any of the estate.

Pedestrian access to certain areas of the estate is - when possible and feasible - granted to walkers respecting the endangered and fragile ecosystem and the Estate's published “code of conduct”.

== Naming ==
Historian Liam Price notes that Luggala, from Irish Log an Lá 'Hollow of the hill', was also known as Fancy, from Irish: Fuinnse, meaning 'ash-tree', and also as Cloghoge (the nearby Cloghoge River drains Lough Tay into Lough Dan). According to Irish academic Paul Tempan, "Price's interpretation of this name [Luggala] as Log an Lágh, or 'hollow of the hill', is doubtful"; pointing out that there is no evidence in any Irish language dictionaries for the existence of the term "lágh". He also notes that the other term "Lá" is unlikely to be a translation of "day"; instead, Tempan records the translation as unresolved listing it in Irish Hill and Mountain Names as "hollow of the [obscure element]". However, Patrick Weston Joyce, historian and etymologist of Irish place names, states in his 1923 book, that "lágh" means "a hill".

== Geography ==
Luggala is in the northeastern section of the Wicklow Mountains, and directly overlooks Lough Tay, which lies at the base of steep granite cliffs on Luggala's east face; Luggala's other slopes are of a much gentler gradient, and are mostly covered in heather. The mountain is a largely isolated peak, with a deep valley between itself and its only neighbour, the peak of Knocknacloghoge 534 metres (1,752 ft) to the immediate south. Luggala is overlooked from the far north-east by the larger massif of Djouce at 725 metres (2,379 ft). Luggala is the 230th-highest peak in Ireland on the Arderin scale, Being below 600 metres (2,000 ft) in height, Luggala does not rank on the Vandeleur-Lynam or Hewitt scales.

== Luggala Estate ==
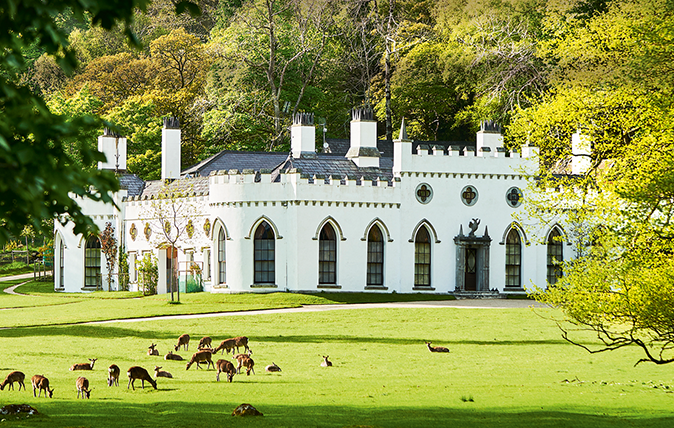
Luggala Lodge

The Luggala Estate is a 5,000-acre (2,000 hectares) estate (also known as the “Guinness Estate” after the Guinness family) designated an EU Natura 2000 habitat as a Special Area of Conservation (SAC) and Special Protection Area (SPA); it is located in a “Blue Dot” high-water catchment area as designated under the EU Water Framework Directive.

In 2018, the Luggala Estate included the mountains of Luggala and Knocknacloghoge, the entire lake of Lough Tay, and part of the lake of Lough Dan.

The estate was developed by the La Touche family, who founded the Bank of Ireland. In 1787, Peter LaTouche built the gothic Luggala Lodge (or "Luggala Castle"), as a hunting lodge which he modelled on Strawberry Hill House in London. In 1937, Ernest Guinness purchased the Luggala Estate from Viscount Powerscourt and then gave it as a wedding gift to his daughter Oonagh on her second marriage, to Lord Oranmore and Browne; she then gifted the property to her son Garech in 1970.

Notable family members buried on the estate include Tara Browne, whose death in a car accident was an inspiration for the Beatles song "A Day in the Life". His grave is one of three situated on the shore of Lough Tay, next to an ornamental building known as the Temple; the two other people buried there are his unnamed baby brother, who was born and died in December 1943, and his half-sister Teresa from Oonagh's first marriage.

Luggala was owned by arts patron Garech Browne, the great-great-great-grandson of Arthur Guinness, until his death in 2018. Garech Browne and the Luggala Estate feature in the 1991 film I Dreamt I Woke Up by John Boorman.

By 2018, Luggala Lodge was a 7,437 square feet (690.9 m^{2}), seven-bedroom property, and the entire estate had 16,379 square feet (1,521.7 m^{2}) of residential property.

The buildings on the estate, including the Lodge, have been rented out commercially, and have included famous guests such as Mick Jagger, the Beatles, and latterly, Michael Jackson. The estate and grounds have been used as the location of some films, including The Hard Way (1979), Zardoz (1974), Excalibur (1981), Braveheart (1995), and King Arthur (2004), as well as the historical drama television series Vikings (from 2013), where it is featured as the fictional village of Kattegat.

In 2017, before his death, Browne put the entire estate up for sale with an asking price of 28 million euros. In 2006, Browne had sold 1,600 acres (650 ha) of the estate to the Irish state for 1.6 million euros, and it is now part of the Wicklow Mountains National Park. On 27 August 2019, the Irish Times reported that the estate had been sold to an overseas buyer at a "substantial discount" to the asking price. In October 2019, several newspapers reported that the estate had been bought by the Count Padulli di Vighignolo for a sum estimated at 20 million euros but the final recorded price on the public Residential Property Price Register was significantly less at €11,585,000.

In December 2019, RTÉ aired a documentary titled Last Days at Luggala on Garech Browne's final years on the estate, up until his death in 2018. In January 2020, a minor part of the estate of Garech Browne, was auctioned at Sotheby's in London.

In March 2020 the maintenance and repair of the estate's 18th and 19th-century livestock infrastructure encompassing almost 50 km of dry walls began with the help of Wicklow's craftsmen versed in the techniques of the time.

In May 2021, Luggala Estate Ltd committed and has started to undertake a multi-decade-long, self-funded, peatland rewetting and restoration programme aimed at bringing back the integrity of the habitats and the ecology degraded by peat harvesting, intensive grazing and neglect. The initiative represents Luggala's initial response towards climate and biodiversity emergencies, and reactivates a proven natural process of carbon sequestration.

== Access ==
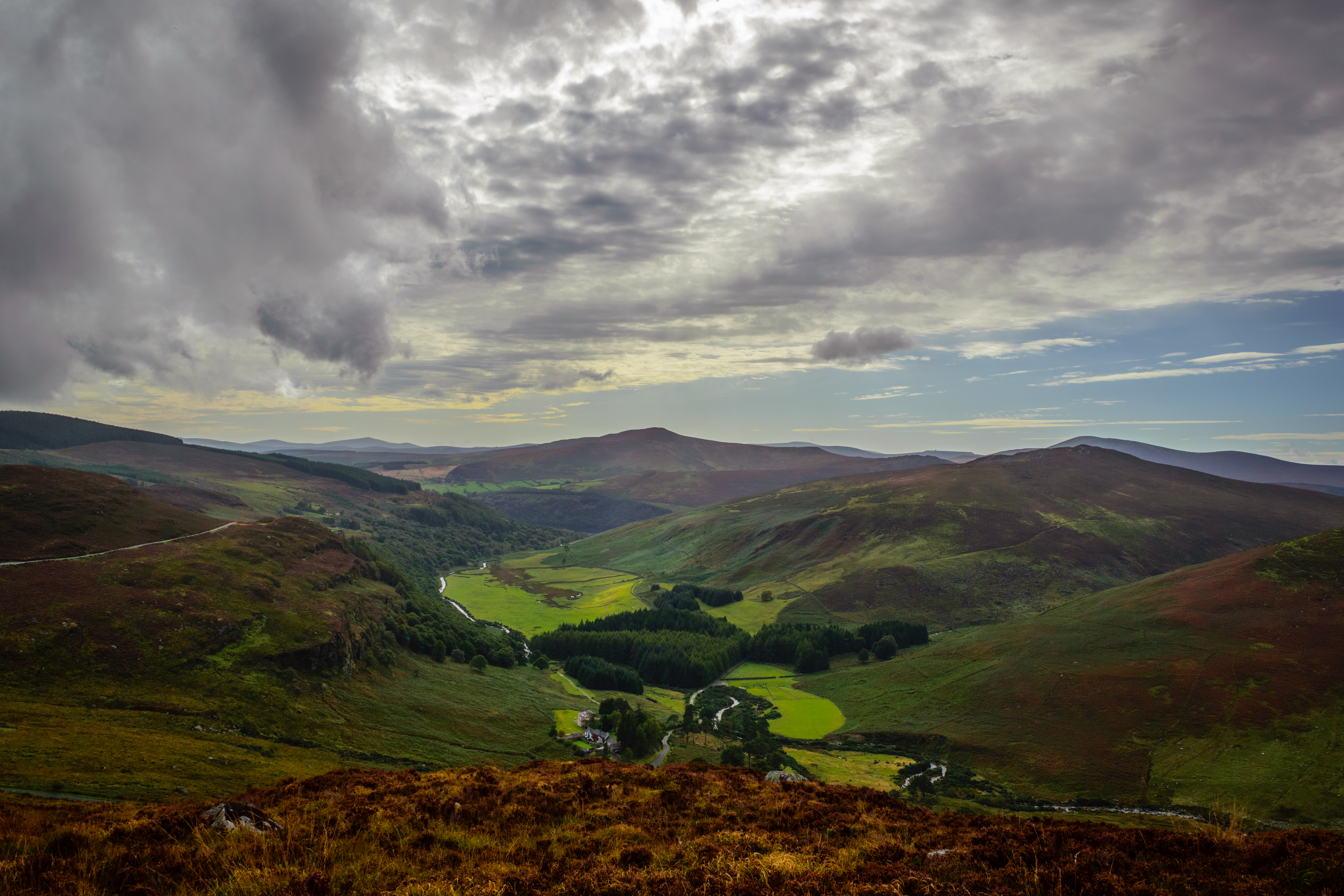
Looking down on to the Cloghoge River in the estate, to which hill-walkers have been allowed access

There are no public rights of way or rights of access to any of the estate. However, owners have permitted public access to certain parts of the estate via the present pedestrian access gate (the Pier Gate) if this were not to interfere with the Estate activities and the privacy of its residents.

In 2018, the Barbican International Corporation (BIC), a Guinness family Guernsey-based trust who controlled the Luggala Estate, erected new "private property" signage and a notice on a gate just off the R759 road frequently used by the public – called the "Pier gate" – that it would be locked after 5.30.

The action led to protests by hill-walking groups, and calls on the Irish state to purchase the Luggala Estate – which was being offered for sale by the BIC trust for €28 million – and which was bordered on three sides by the Wicklow Mountains National Park.

From November 2019 Luggala Estate Ltd has reinstated - when feasible - pedestrian access to areas of the estate to responsible walkers respecting an environmental “code of conduct” and signage has been taken down.

== Recreation ==
=== Hillwalking ===
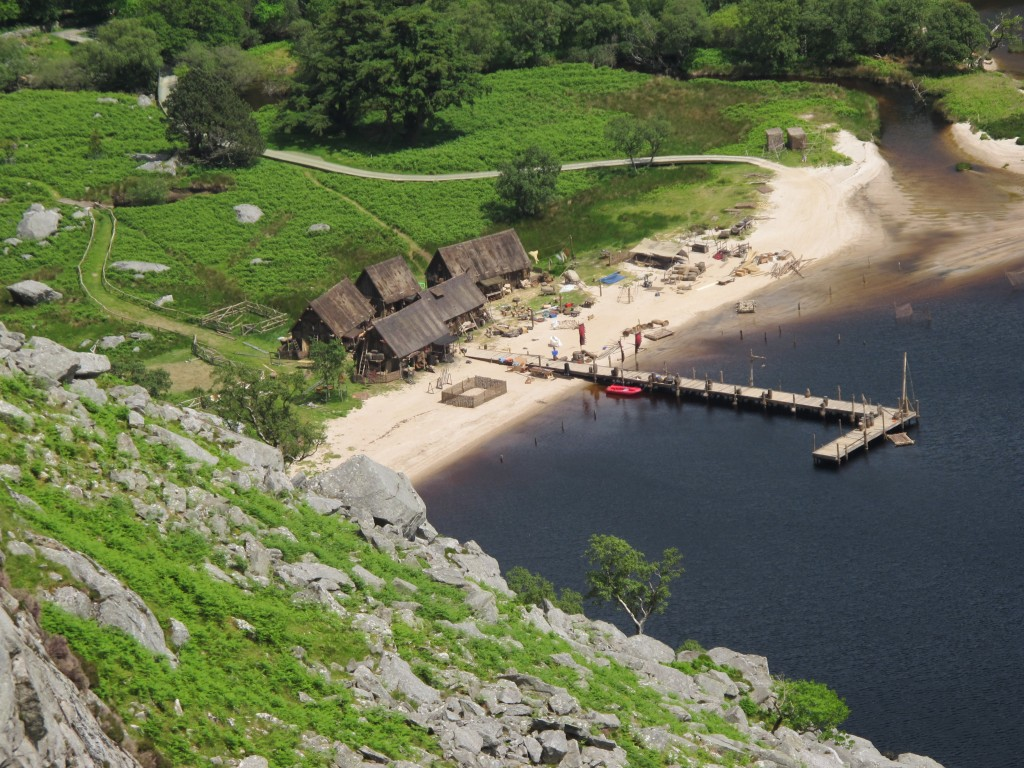
Looking down Luggala's east face to the set of Kattegat for Vikings, on the northern shore of Lough Tay

Access permitting, the most common route to the summit of Luggala is from the public access gate on the R759 – known as the "Pier gates" (O173065). This 7-kilometre (4.3 mi), circa 2.5-hour route (to the summit and back), descends a tarmac road down to the bridge of Cloghoge River, where it then leaves the road (that continues on to Lough Dan), to ascend up the 400 metres (1,300 ft) long shoulder to the summit ridge of Luggala; the path is then retraced back to the Pier gates. There is a sandy/gravel mountain path from just beyond the bridge of Cloghoge River, that cuts through the ferns and heathers on Luggala, to the final summit ridge, however, it can be difficult to find in poor weather or low visibility.

A longer 12-kilometre (7.5 mi), circa 5-hour route, incorporates the neighbouring peak of Knocknacloghoge and Lough Dan, before returning to the Pier gates; it is described as "surely one of the most scenic walks in the Wicklow Mountains".

=== Rock climbing ===
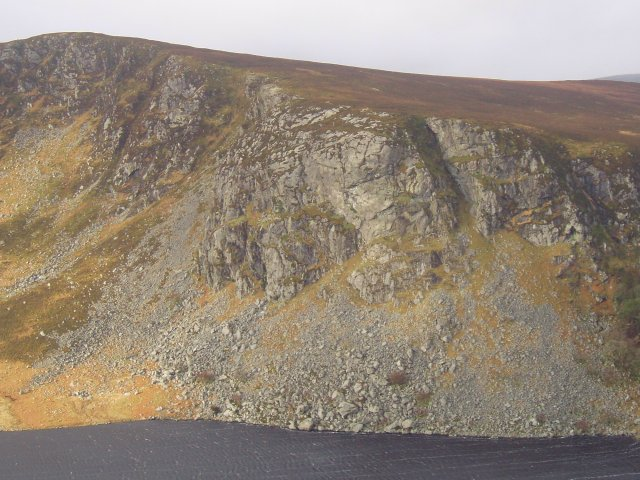
Cliffs used by rock climbers

Luggala's east-facing granite cliffs are a rock-climbing location, however, route-finding can be difficult and the conditions are described as a "serious mountain crag". As of July 2019, the online climbing database lists 129 climbs, with the majority in the Very Severe (VS) 4c to E1 5b rock climbing grade categories, however, there are also several extreme routes such as Precious Metal (E7 6c), and The Great Roof (E6 5c, 6c).

The Irish Online Climbing Database records five major sections: G & H Buttresses, Woody Wall & Conifer Buttress (Creag Conaisreach), South Buttress (Creag Fasra), Main Face, and North Buttress (Creag Thuaidh). It notes the rock is coarser with better friction than that of Glendalough, however, in contrast to Glendalough, the routes are less direct and do not follow obvious crack-lines; it also notes that the zig-zag nature of routes means that an ability to use double-rope techniques is important to avoid friction drag. Classic climbs are Pine Tree Buttress (S 4a), Muskrat Ramble (HVC 4b, 5a, 4c), and Dance of the Tumblers (E1 5b).

== See also ==
- Wicklow Way
- Wicklow Round
- Wicklow Mountains
- Lists of mountains in Ireland
- List of historic houses in the Republic of Ireland
