= R759 road (Ireland) =

Regional road in Ireland

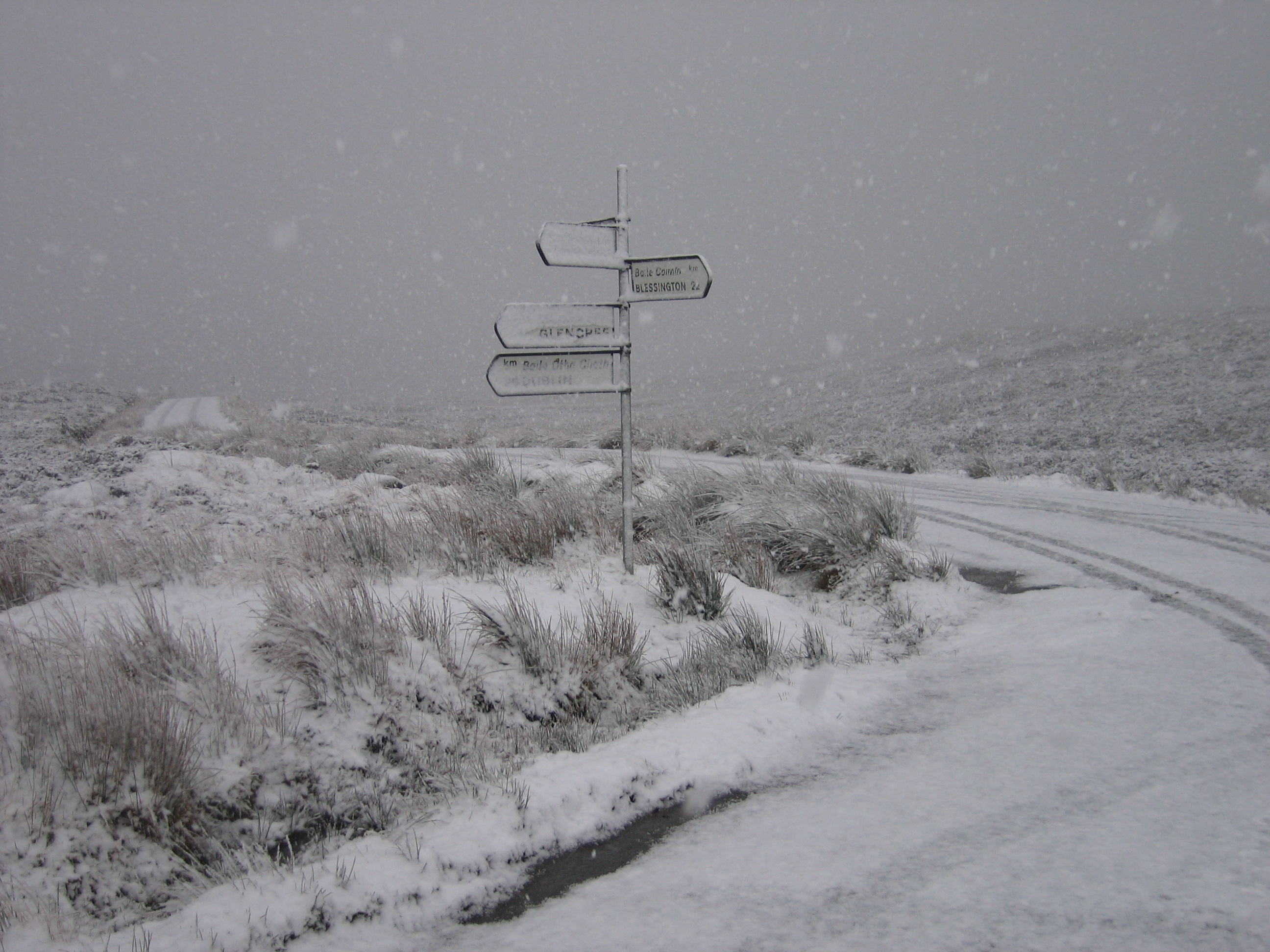
The R115/Military Road joins the R759 at the Sally Gap

The R759 road is a regional road in Ireland running south-east to north-west through the Sally Gap in the Wicklow Mountains, from the R755 near Roundwood in East Wicklow to the N81 in West Wicklow. The other route through the Wicklow Mountains from east to west is the Wicklow Gap which is crossed by the R756.

The highest point on the road is at the Sally Gap where it crosses the Military Road (R115), 503m (1,650 ft) (53.1376°N 6.3120°W). The road passes through some spectacular scenery, including the corrie lake of Lough Tay below Luggala mountain, in the Guinness Estate; the road gives access to several woodlands car-parks at Lough Tay, which are used to access the mountains around Djouce. The moorlands of the Sally Gap plateau, the Liffey Head Bog on the slopes of Tonduff, form the source of the River Liffey. The road is 27 km (17 mi) in length, and in winter can be dangerous or impassable as it is not treated by the Local Authority.

The academic Michael Fewer notes that the Sally Gap, at 500m above sea level, does not give the sense of a mountain "gap" between surrounding peaks as such, and only from a distance to the west is it possible to see that "there is a slight dip there between the rounded granite hills to the north and south."

== History ==
Fewer writes that it is "very likely" that the east-west route through the Wicklow Mountains which crosses the Military Road at the Sally Gap had been used by man for "thousands of years". East of the Sally Gap it is likely that this track followed the Cloghoge River down past Lough Tay to reach the coastal plain via Lough Dan. When the valley of Lough Tay was reclaimed and cultivated in the mid-1700s, the old track was "probably", according to Fewer, diverted up along the east side of the valley to a higher track that was known previously as the Murderin' Pass.

== Filming location ==
The isolated valleys the road passes through have been used as locations in the following films:

- Braveheart (1995)

== Gallery ==
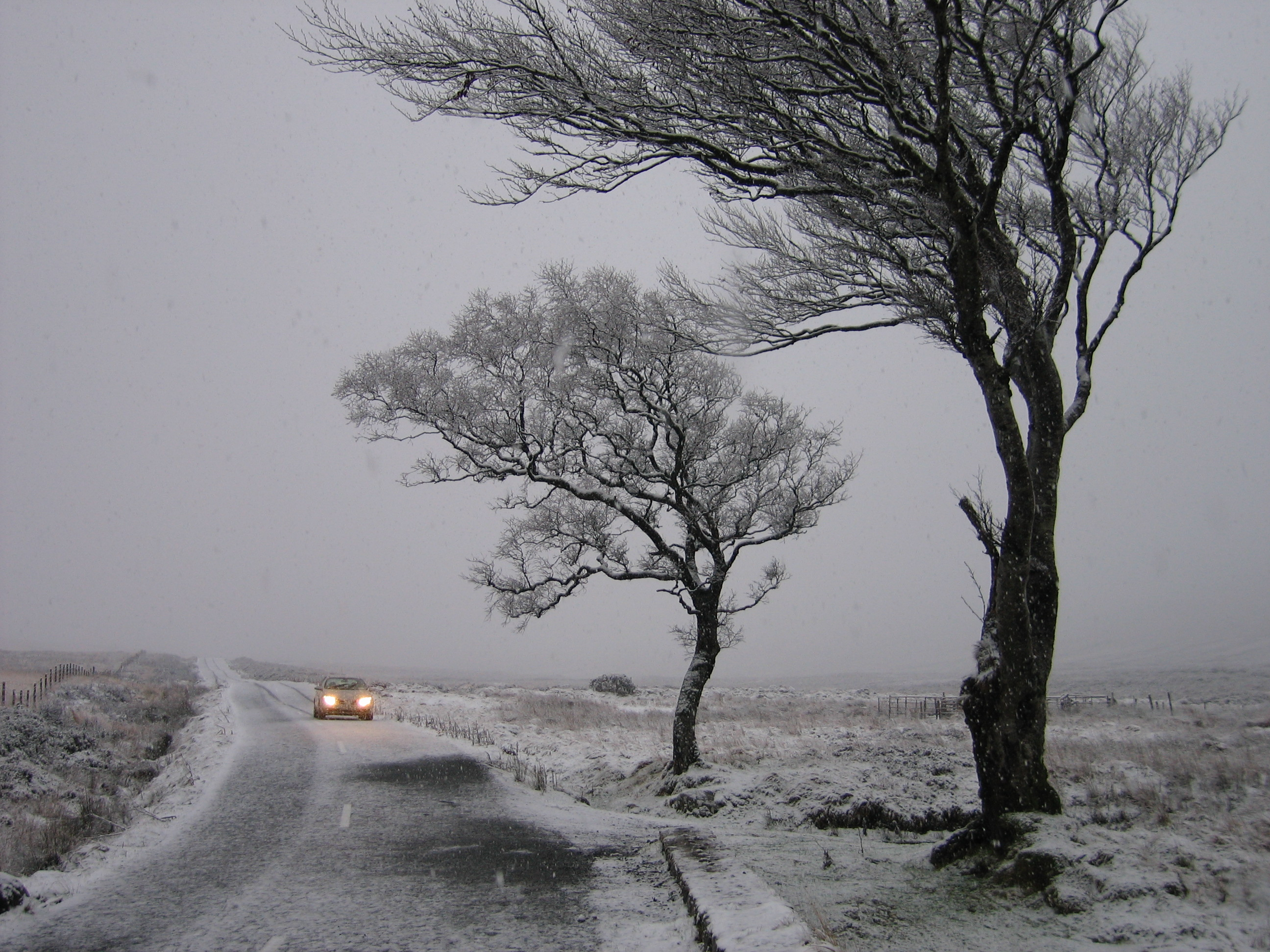
Lone trees near the gap

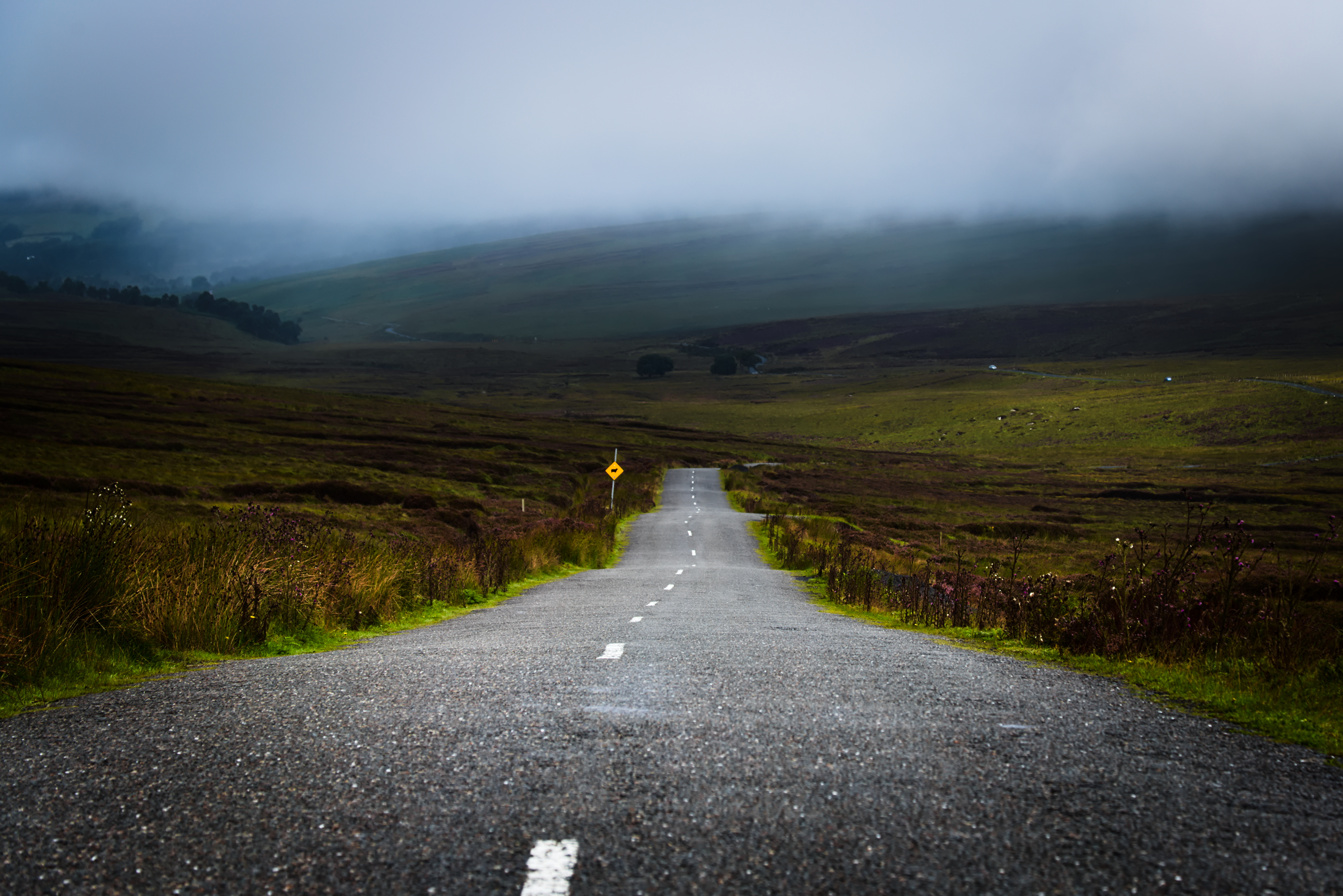
Rear Sally Gap

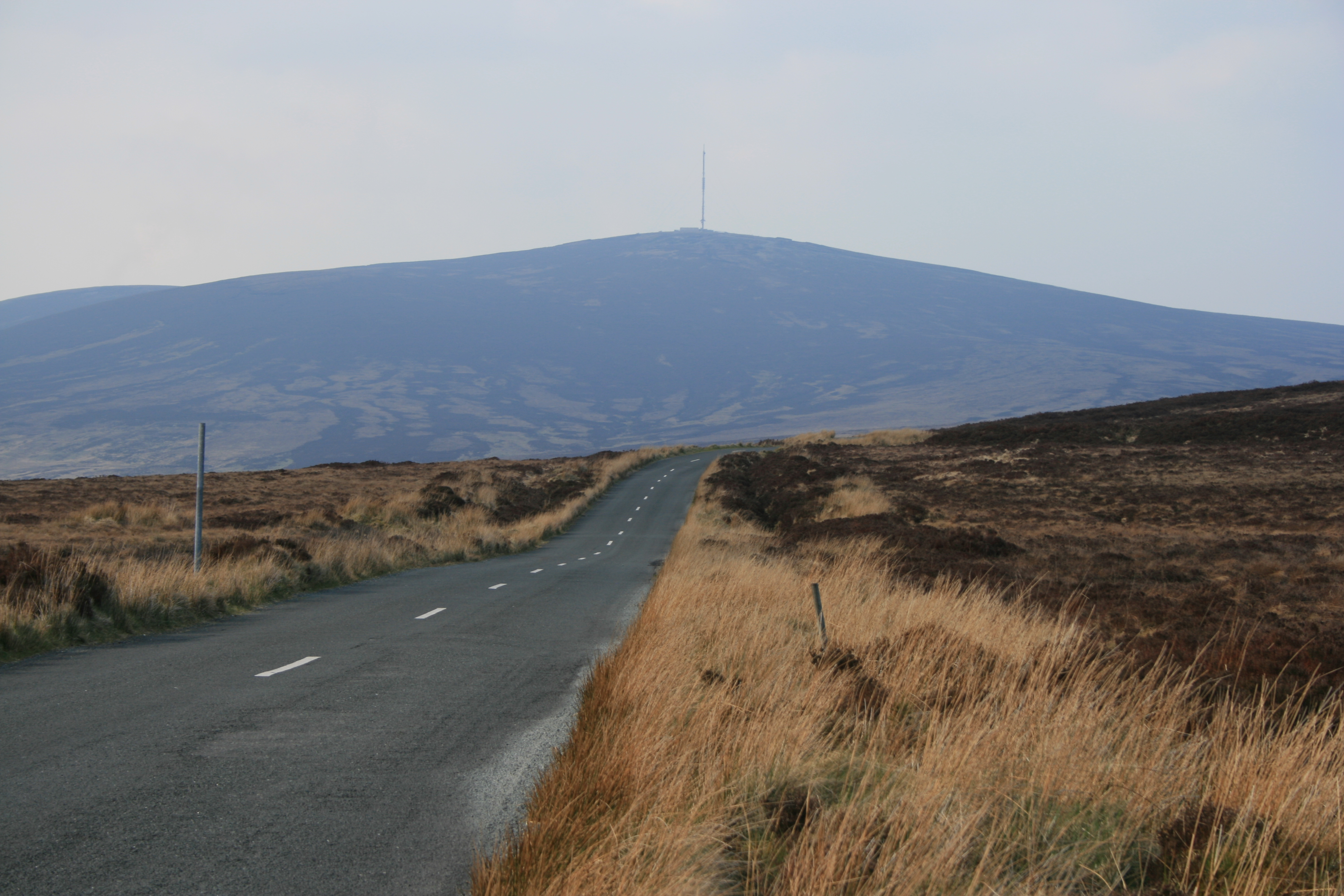
Kippure from R759

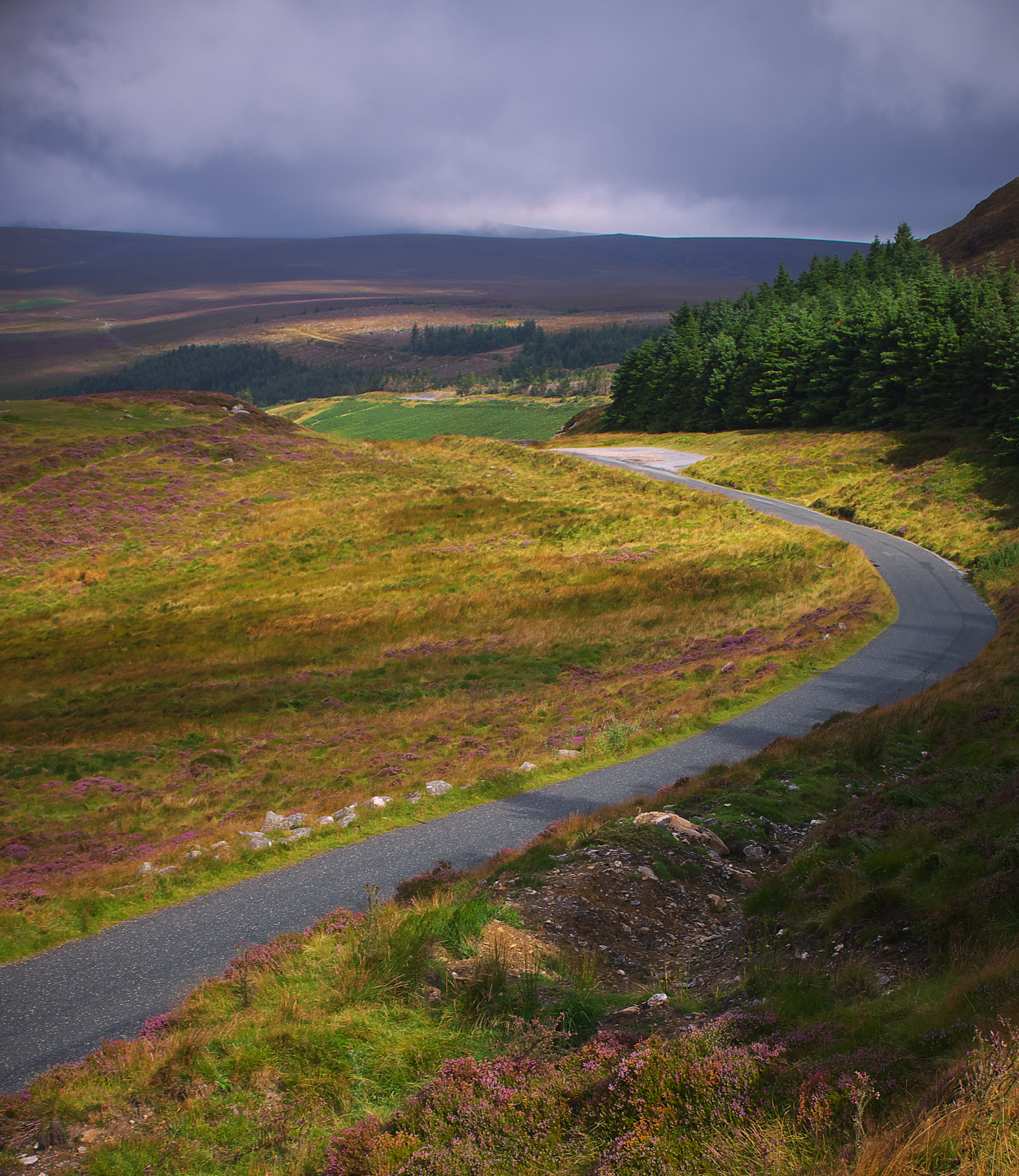
R759 above Lough Tay

== See also ==
- Roads in Ireland
- National primary road
- National secondary road
- Rathfarnham and the Military Road
- Ireland's first ski rescue
