= I Dreamt I Woke Up =

- Directed by: John Boorman
- Written by: John Boorman
- Produced by: Sean Ryerson
- Starring: John Boorman; John Hurt; Janet McTeer; Charley Boorman
- Narrated by: John Boorman
- Cinematography: Seamus Deasy
- Edited by: Ron Davis
- Release date: 1991
- Running time: 44 minutes
- Country: Ireland
- Language: English

I Dreamt I Woke Up is a 1991 Irish short film directed by John Boorman. It stars John Hurt and Janet McTeer as well as Boorman and his son Charley.

Commissioned by the BBC as part of "The Director's Place" series, the essay/documentary explores the home and neighbours of John Boorman and the mystical qualities of the Wicklow Mountains as well as their influence on some of Boorman's films, namely "Excalibur", "Deliverance" and "Hope And Glory". The film features Garech Browne and his Luggala Estate, and also refers to Garech's younger brother Tara Browne.

== Production ==
The director discussed the film in "Projections 1", an anthology about filmmakers he edited, and included the complete shooting script of "I Dreamt I Woke Up". The origin and genesis of the project is described in detail in Brian Hoyle's book about the director as well as in Boorman's two autobiographies
