= Lough Dan =

Lake in Wicklow, Ireland

- Loch Deán (Irish)
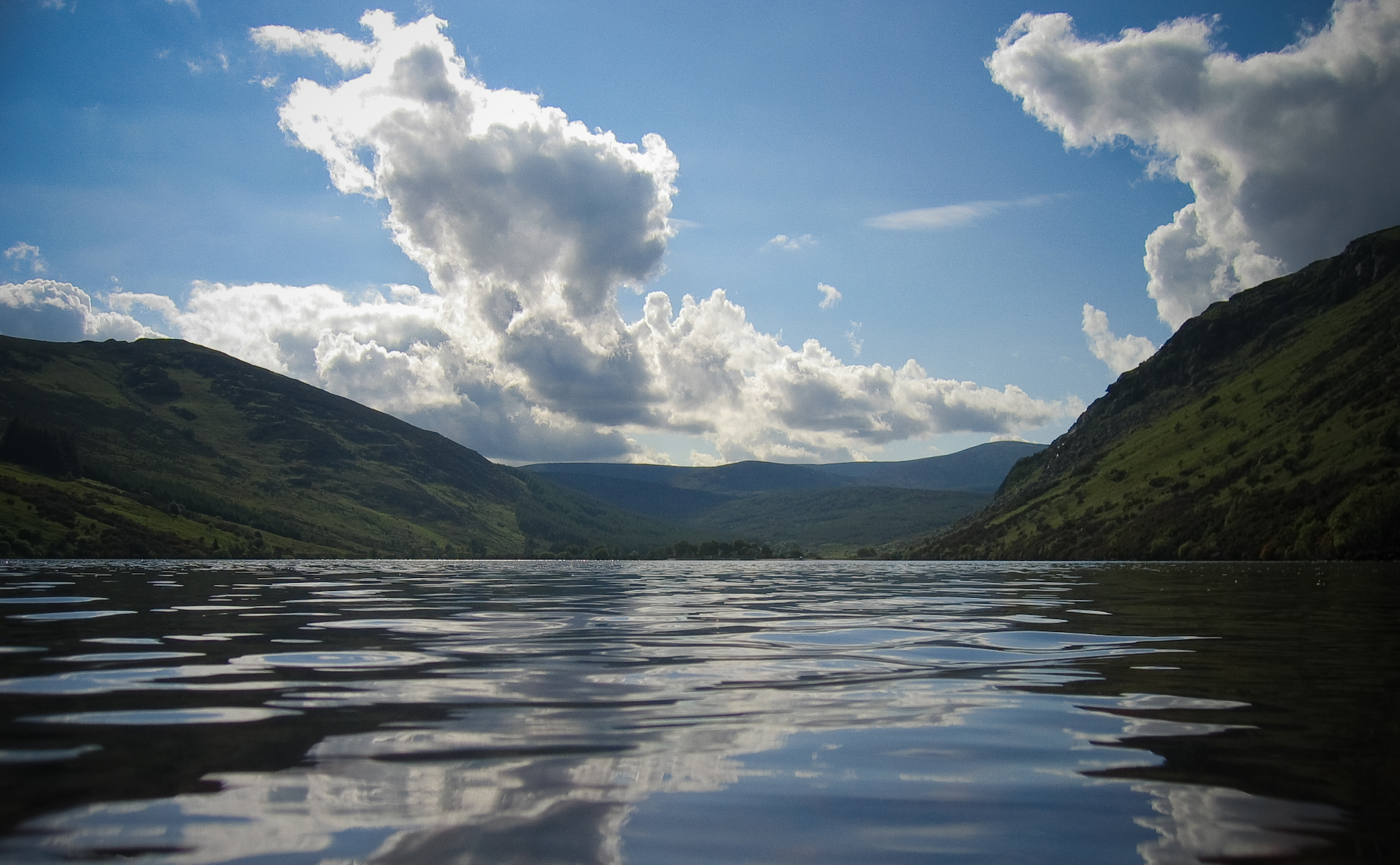
- Looking south-east

- Location within Ireland
- Location: County Wicklow
- Coordinates: 53.075436°N 6.285918°W
- Primary inflows: River Cloghoge, River Inchavore
- Primary outflows: River Avonmore
- Catchment area: 63.18 km^{2} (24.39 sq mi)
- Basin countries: Ireland
- Max. length: 3 km (1.9 mi)
- Max. width: 0.5 km (0.31 mi)
- Surface area: 1.03 km^{2} (0.40 sq mi)
- Average depth: 13.5 m (44 ft)
- Surface elevation: 200 m (660 ft)
- Islands: none

Lough Dan (Irish: Loch Deán) is a scenic boomerang-shaped ribbon lake largely set on private property, in the Wicklow Mountains in Ireland. Lough Dan lake lies at the base of Luggala 595 metres (1,952 ft) and Knocknacloghoge 534 metres (1,752 ft) mountains. The lough is fed by the Cloghoge (draining Lough Tay), and Inchavore rivers, and is drained by the River Avonmore. Part of Lough Dan forms part of the Guinness Estate at Luggala, and has limited public access.

== Geography ==
The Inchavore river flows into Lough Dan from the north-west. An outflow from Lough Tay – the Cloghoge river – feeds it from the north-east. It is drained to the south by the River Avonmore. Most of the lake is surrounded by private lands, though the north-western corner is part of the Wicklow National Park.

== Scouting ==
The Scouting Ireland S.A.I. national campsite, now one of several belonging to Scouting Ireland, lies beside the lake. In 1997, Lough Dan was the site of an Irish Scouting jamboree, Lough Dan '97, at the S.A.I. national campsite, co-organised by the Federation of Irish Scouts Associations. The Jamboree was abandoned on the Thursday due to inclement weather and flooding.

== In culture ==
Some of the exterior scenes of 2009 Irish post-apocalyptic film One Hundred Mornings were filmed around the lake.

== Gallery ==
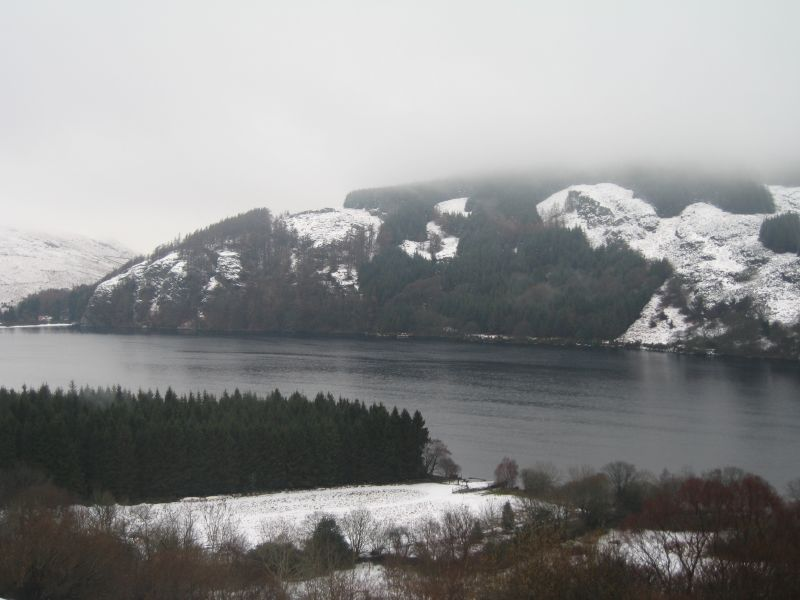
Snow around Lough Dan

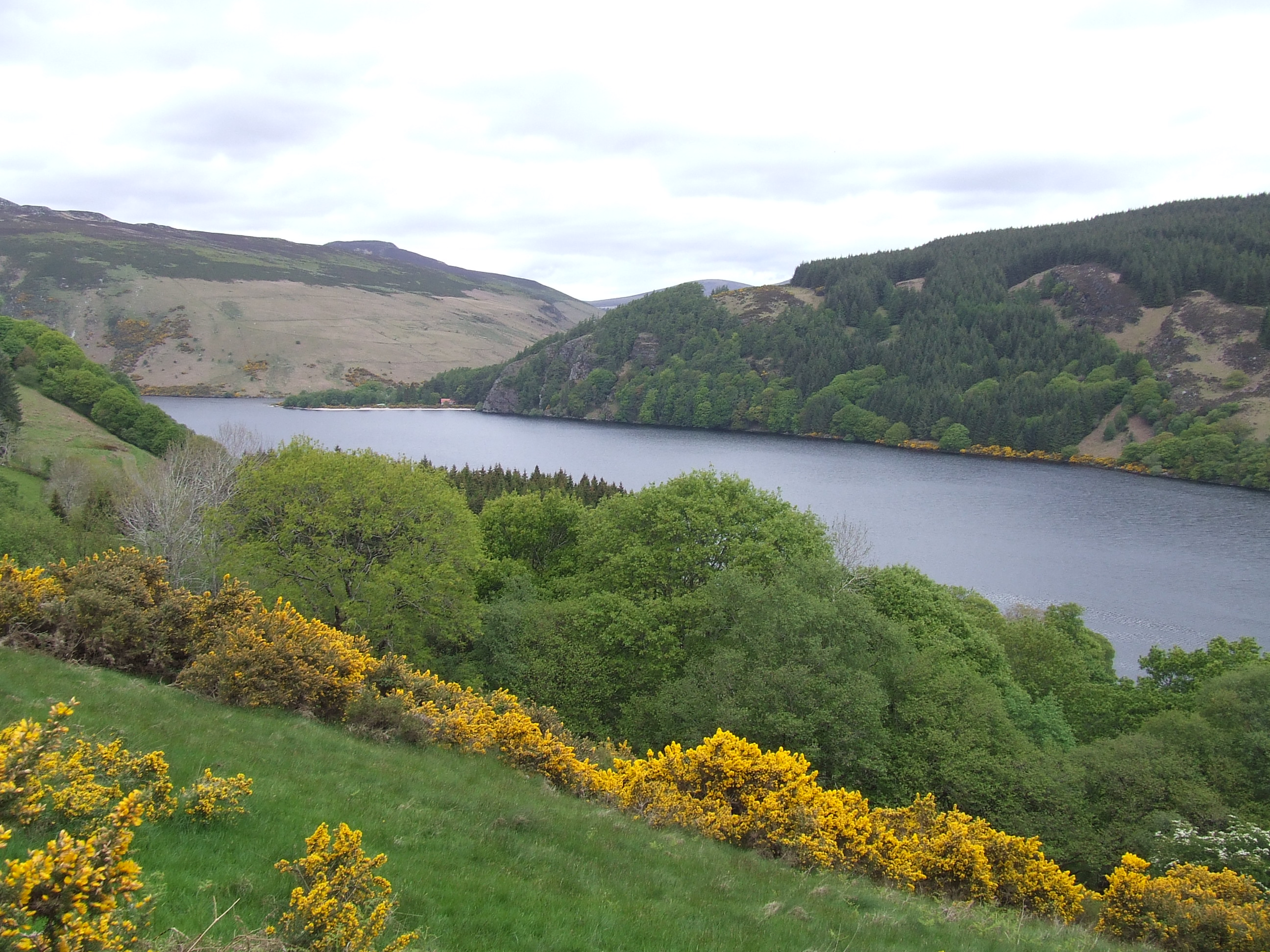
Looking north from west bank

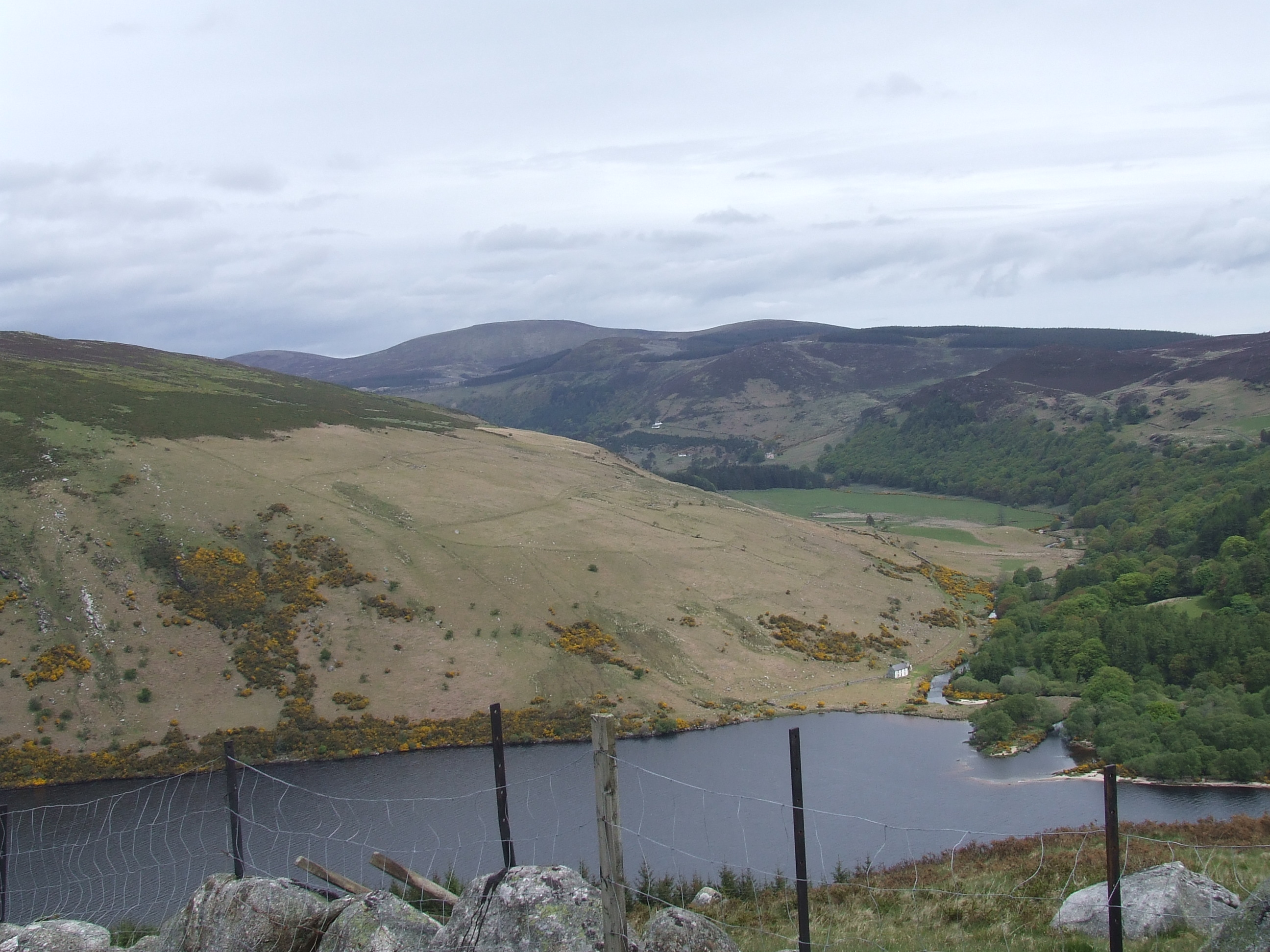
Looking south-east from west bank

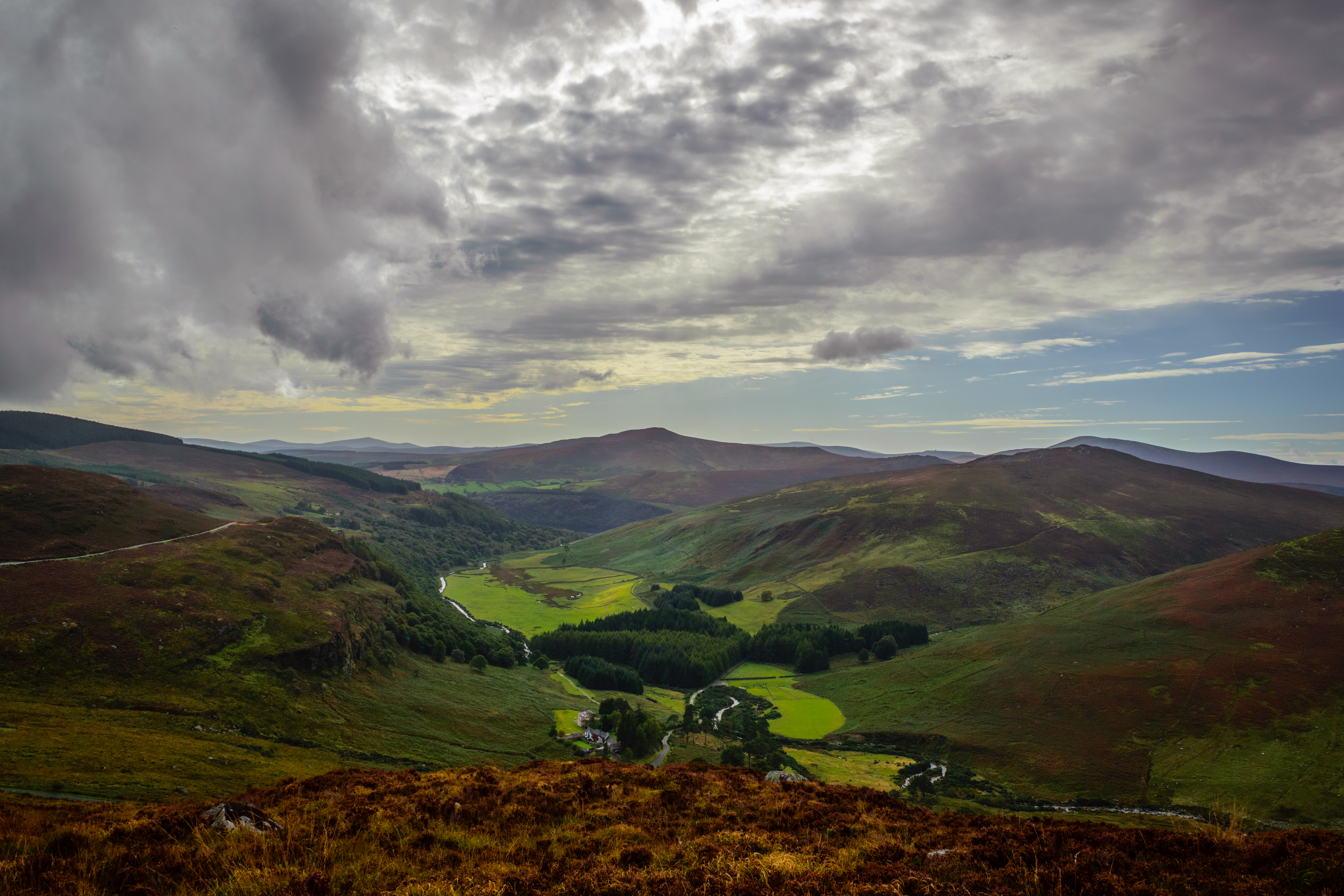
Cloghoge River between Lough Tay and Lough Dan

== See also ==
- List of loughs of Ireland
- Lists of mountains in Ireland
- Wicklow Way
