= Small Basilica, Plovdiv =

Basilica in Plovdiv, Bulgaria

Small Basilica of Philippopolis
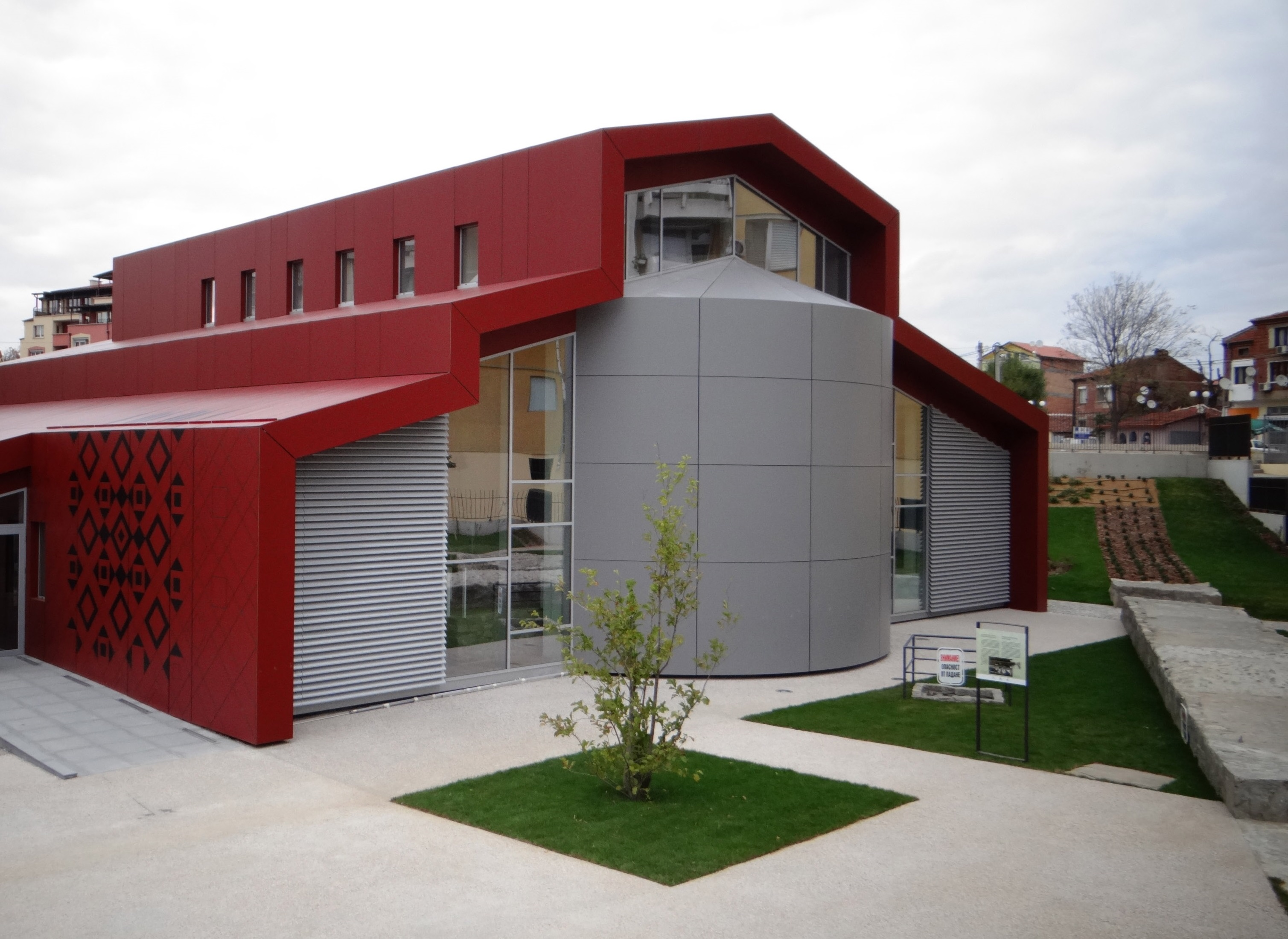
- Small basilica Exterior

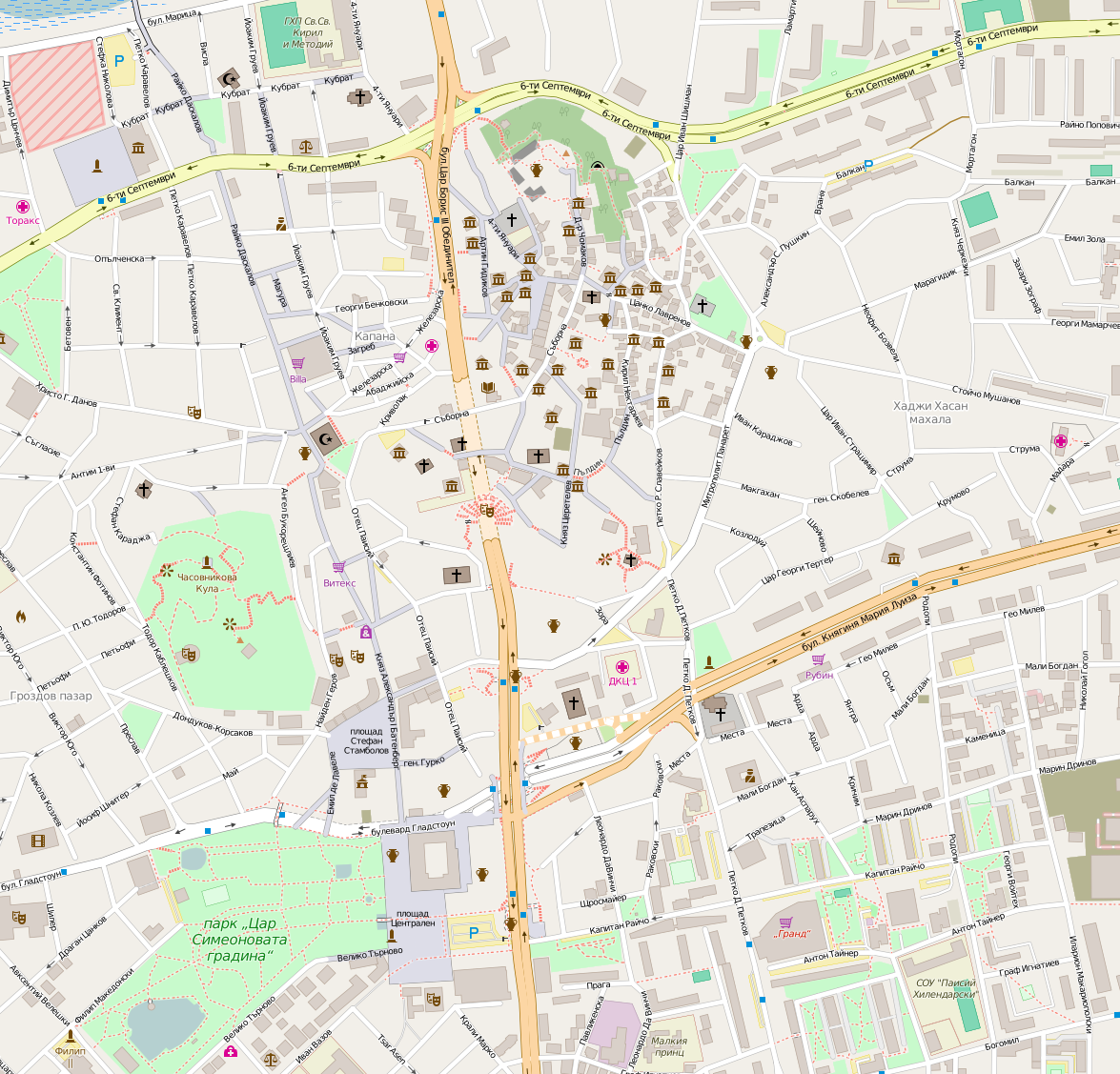
- Location within Plovdiv City Center
- 42.146448°N 24.757944°E
- Type: Basilica
- Periods: Roman Empire
- Location: Plovdiv, Bulgaria

History
- Built: The second half of the 5th century AD
- Abandoned: The end of 6th century AD

Site notes
- Material: bricks, marble
- Length: 20 m (66 ft)
- Width: 13 m (43 ft)
- Excavation dates: 1988, 2010
- Archaeologists: Mina Bospachieva
- Condition: Restored
- Owner: Plovdiv Municipality
- Public access: Yes

The Small Basilica of Philippopolis (Bulgarian: Малка базилика на Филипопол, Malka bazilika na Filipopol) is one of Plovdiv's most distinctive landmarks. The basilica is located on Maria Louisa Blvd in the central part of Bulgaria's second-largest city. The ruins of the early Christian church were found during construction works in the area in 1988. The three-nave basilica is an example of the exceptional skill of mosaic builders in ancient Philippopolis.

== The basilica ==
The basilica was built in the second half of the 5th century AD and contained rich architectural decoration including a marble colonnade between the naves, a marble altar screen, a pulpit, and a synthronon in the altar apse. The total length of the building is 20 m and its width is 13 m. Originally, it was built as a three-nave basilica with one apse and a narthex. The floors are covered with colorful Roman mosaics with geometrical motifs. A small chapel is built against the south end of the basilica and a baptistery is attached to the northern part of the building. The total length of the church is 20 m and its width is 13 m. The baptistery has a square plan, and contains a cruciform baptizing pool and polychromatic mosaics. Deers, pigeons, and other Christian symbols were depicted on them.

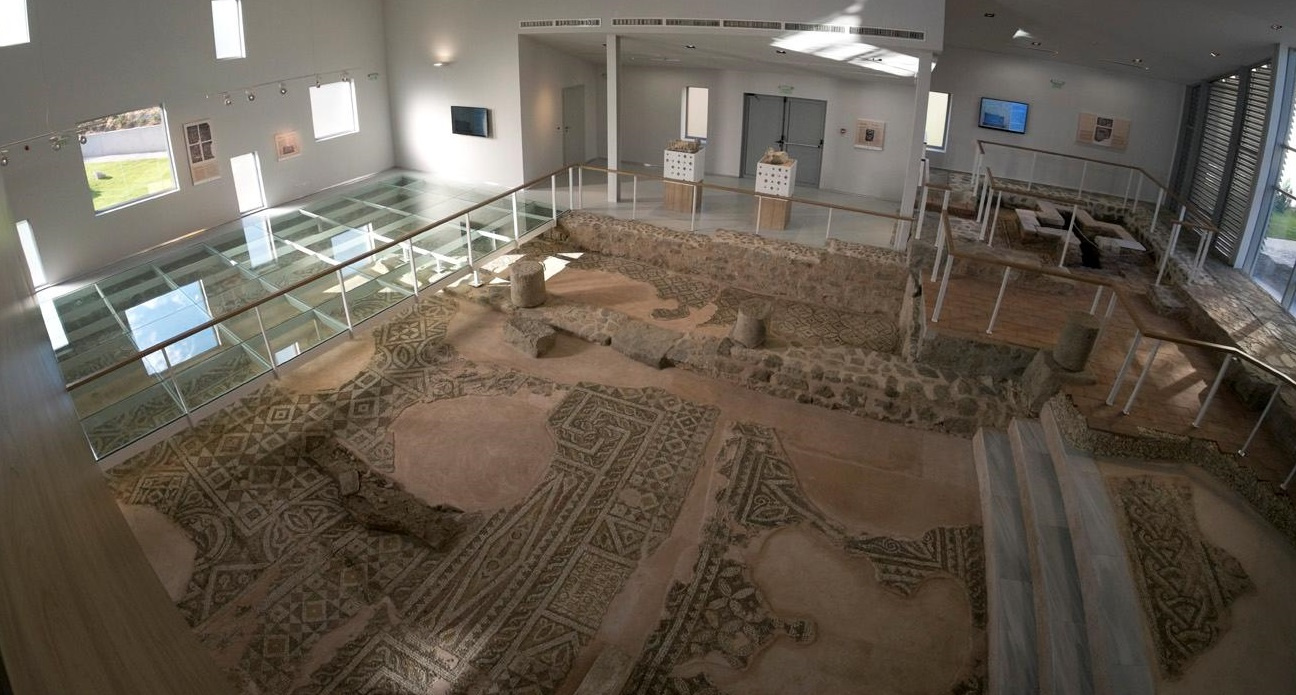
Mosaic floor

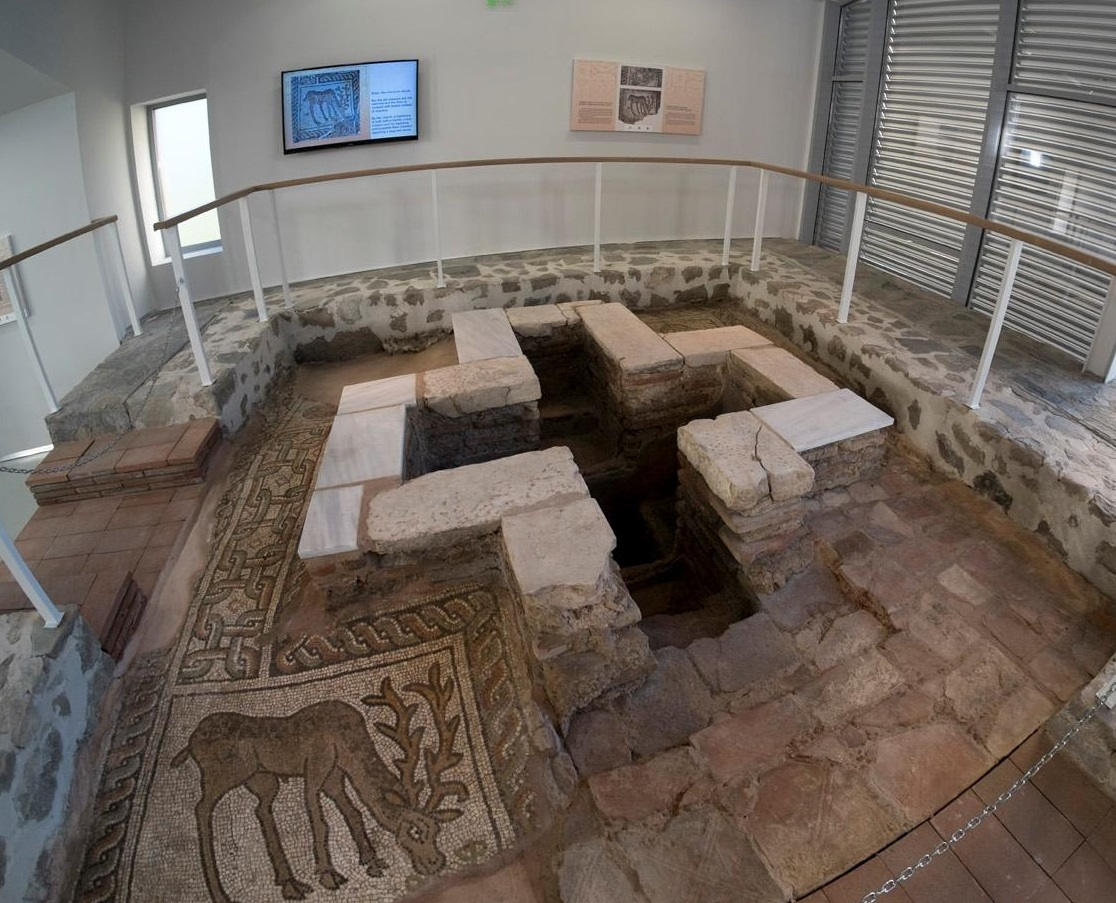
The baptistery

== Excavation and restoration ==
- 1988 - The ruins of the early Christian basilica were accidentally discovered during the construction of an apartment block in the area.
- 1993-1994 - A team from the National Monuments of Culture Institute removed and put in storage about half of the mosaics, leaving and conserving the rest in situ.
- 1995 - The basilica and the adjacent remains of ancient fortification wall were declared a national monument of culture.
- 2000 - Some of the mosaics were restored by the archeologist Mina Bospachieva and the restorationist Elena Kantareva-Decheva.
- 2010 - A thorough conservation and restoration project was initiated with the financial support of the America for Bulgaria Foundation, the Ministry of Culture of the Republic of Bulgaria, and the Plovdiv Municipality.
- 2013 - The restored small basilica was inaugurated.
- 2014 - The small basilica opened to the public on 1 May.

== Gallery ==
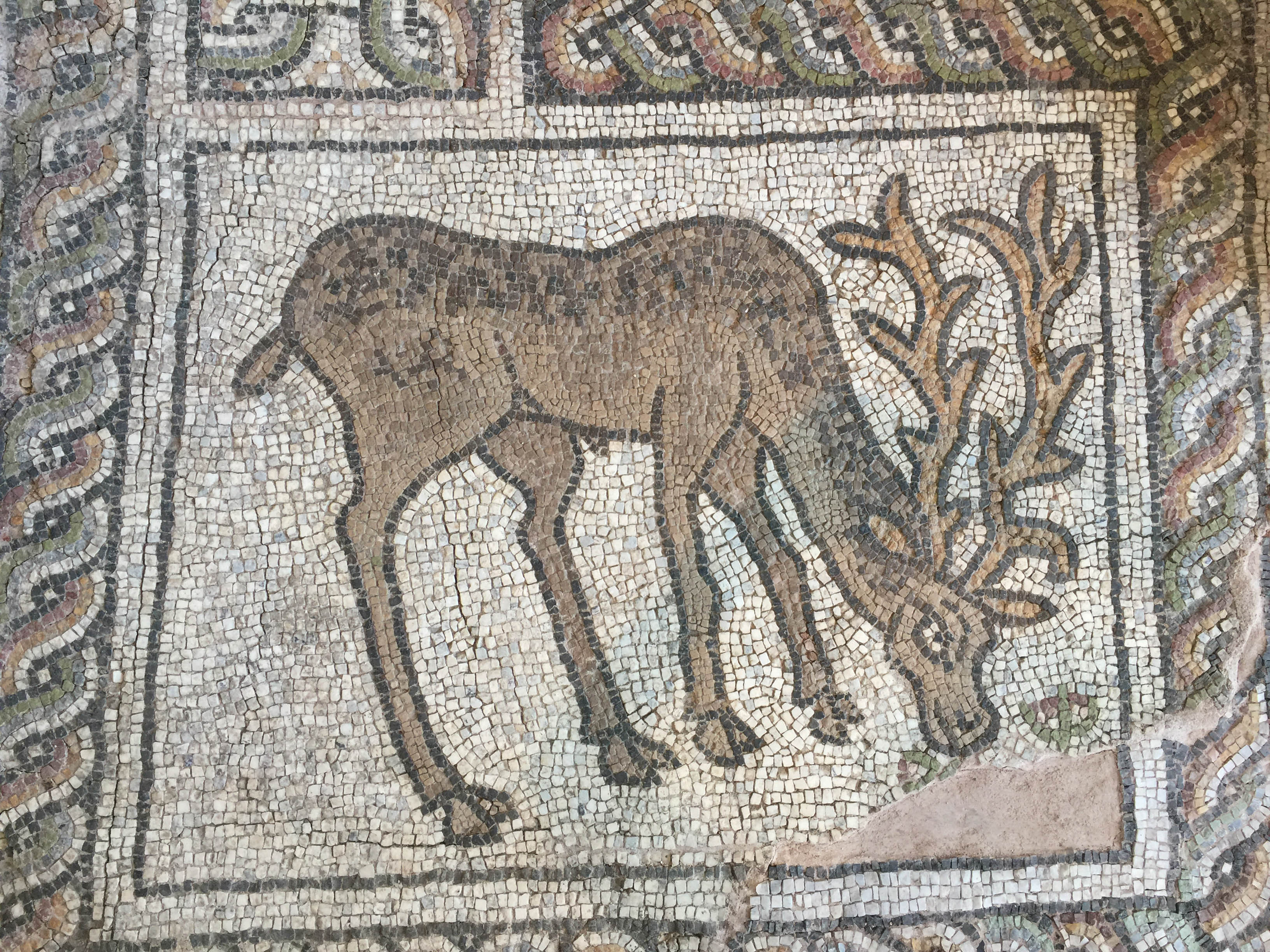
Mosaic floor depicting deer

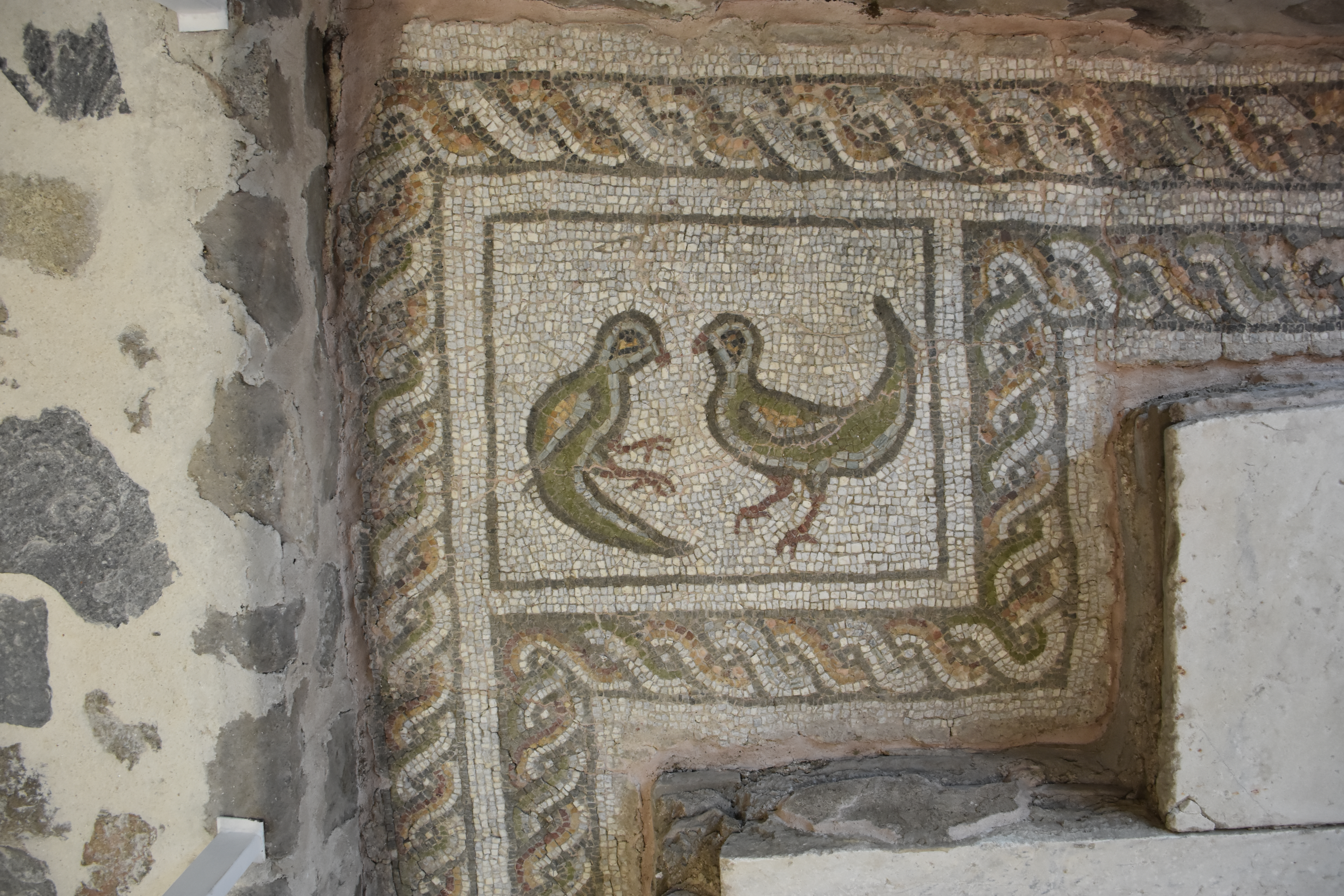
Mosaic floor depicting birds

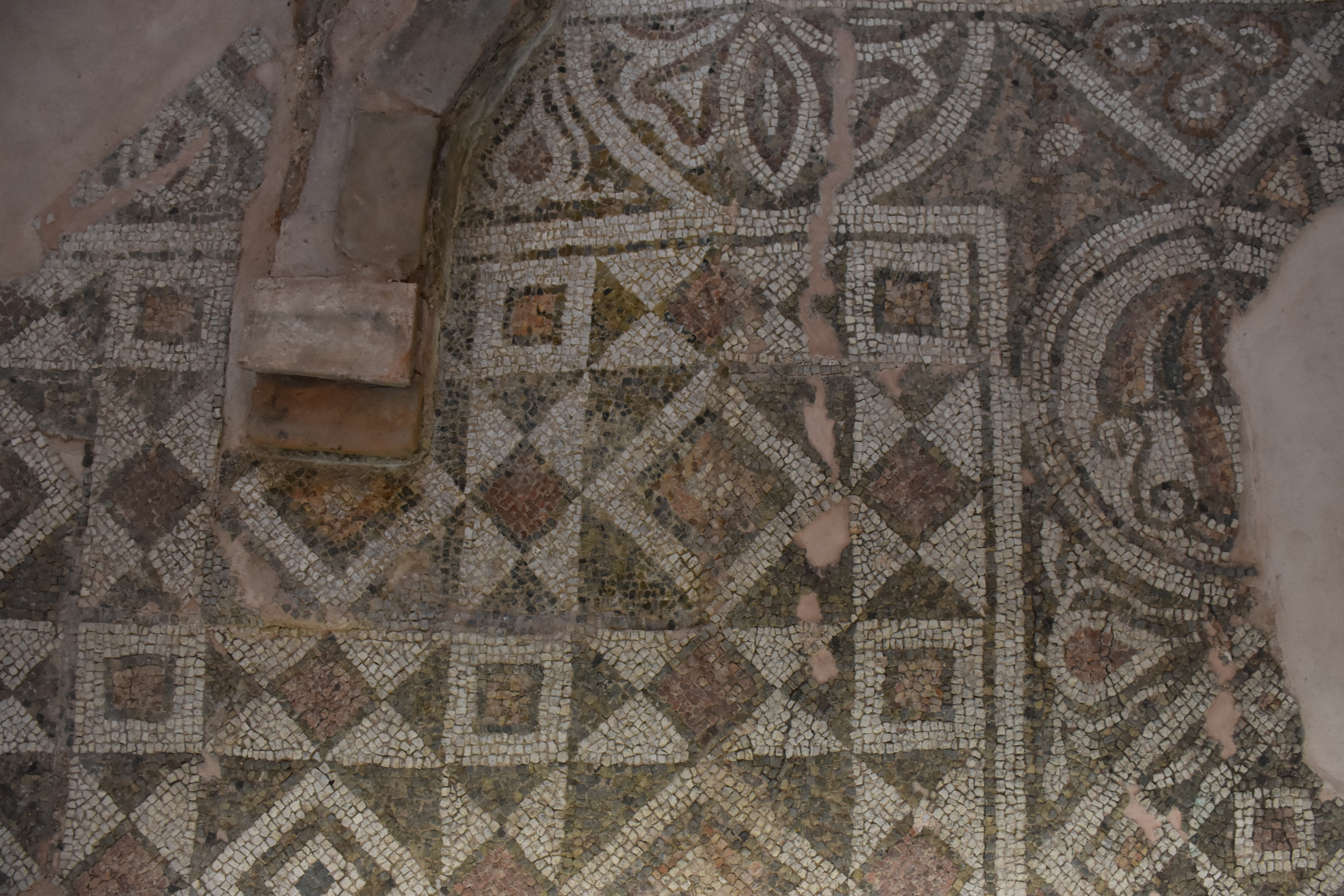
Mosaic floor

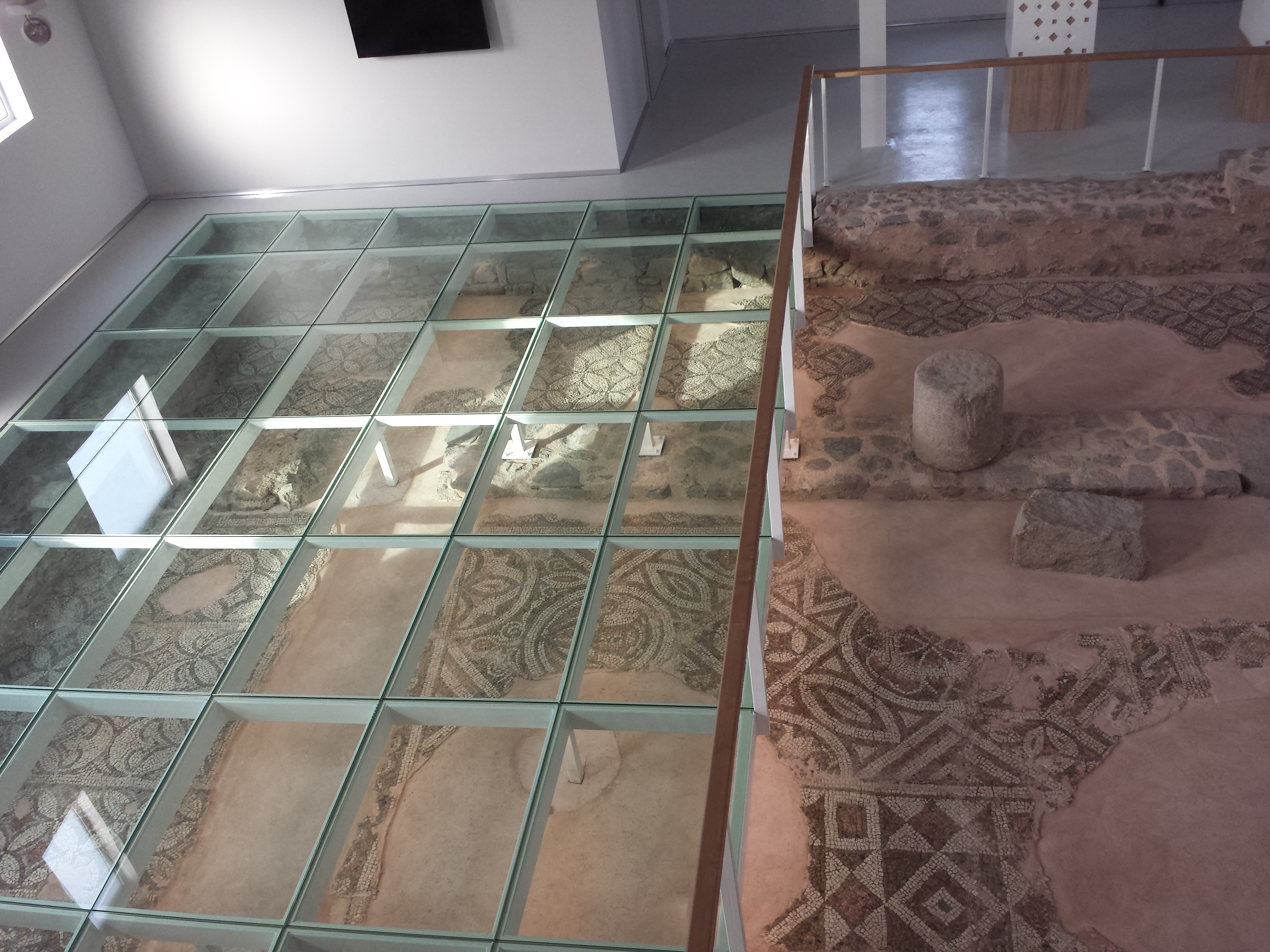
Glass floor over the mosaics

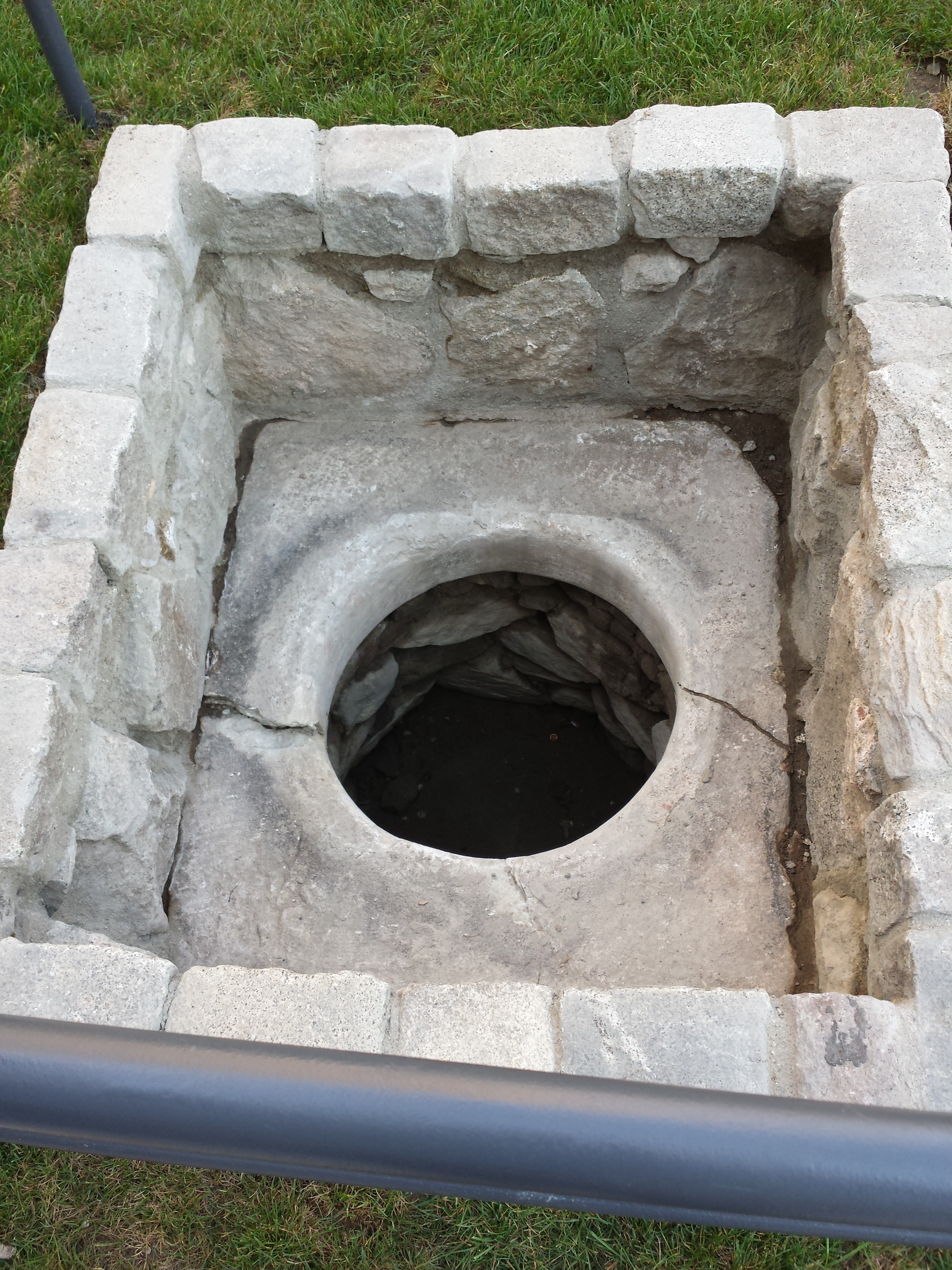
Ancient well near the basilica

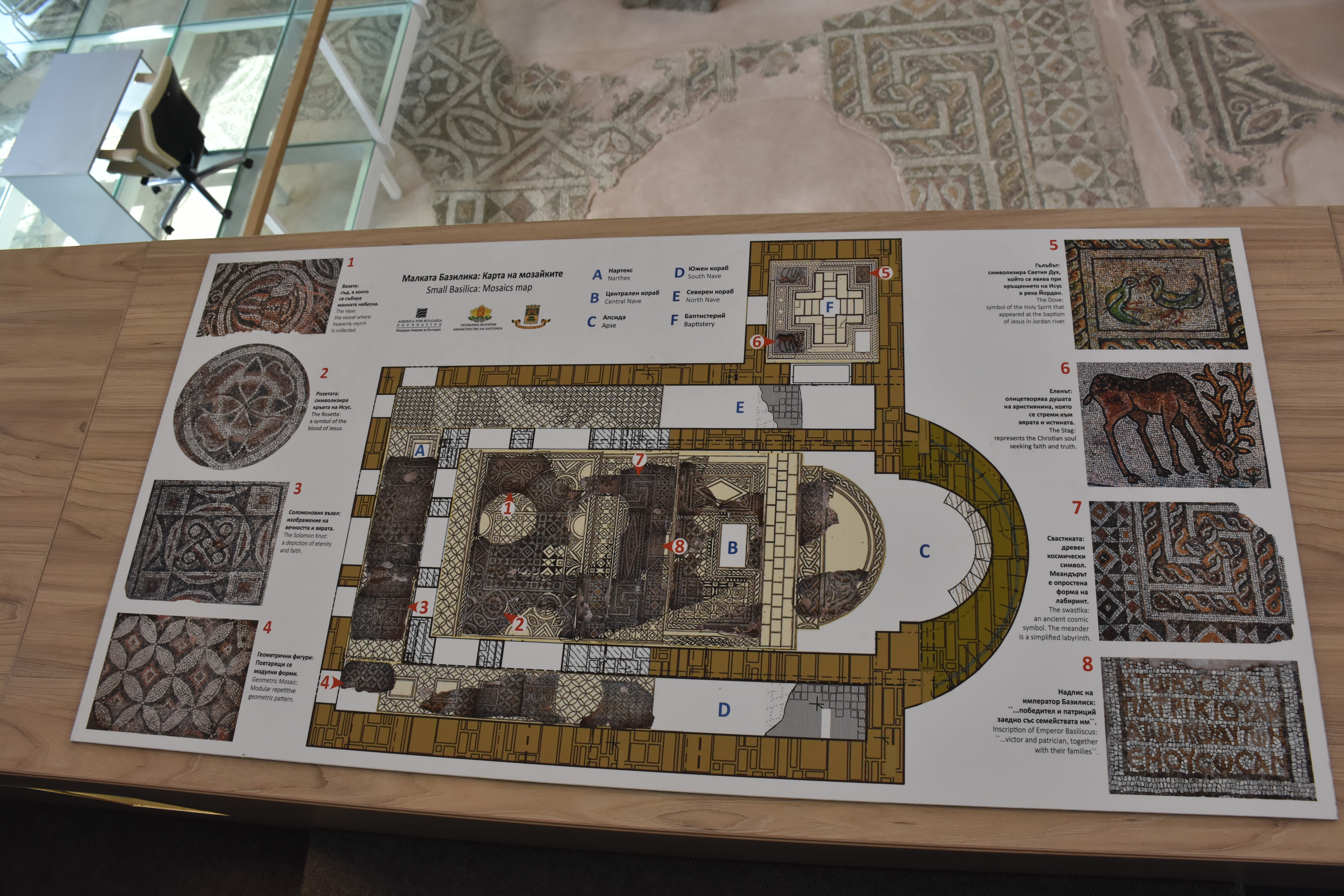

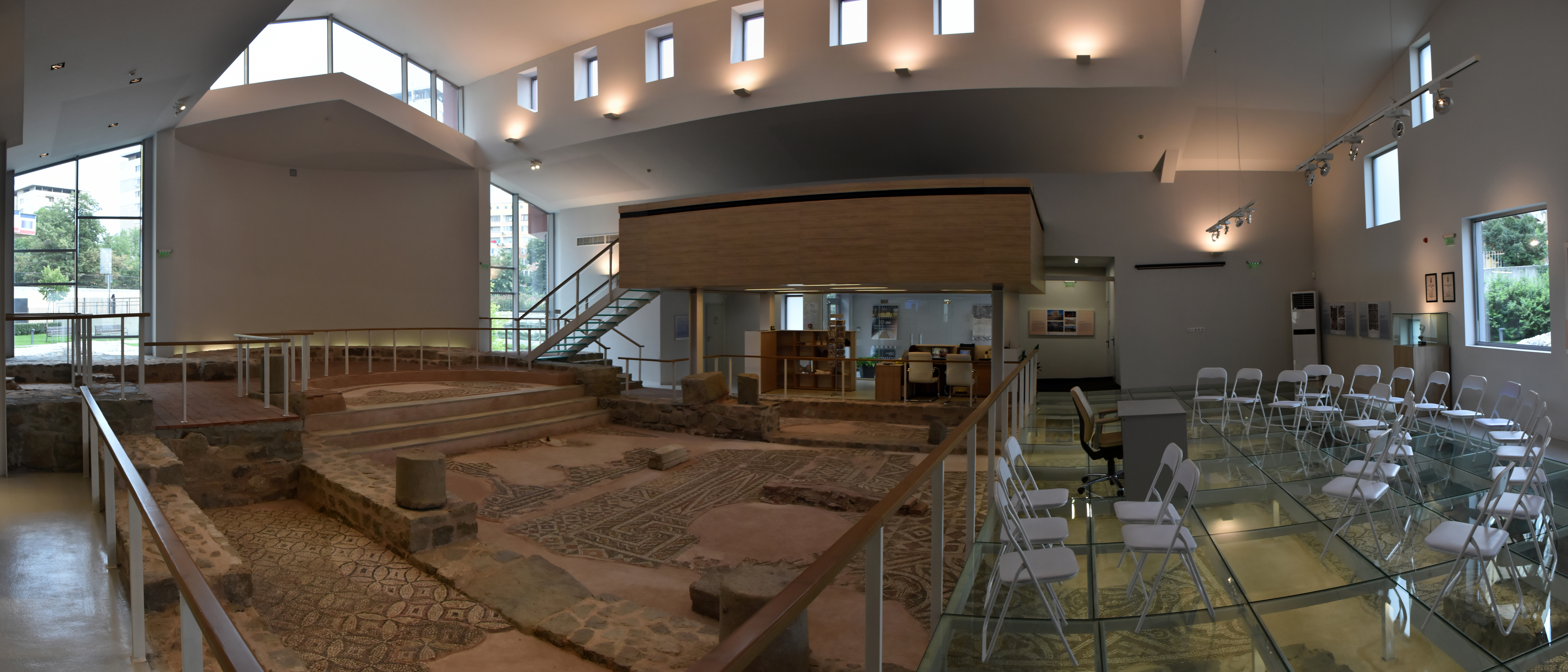
Basilica interior
